= Chitra Sarwara =

Indian politician

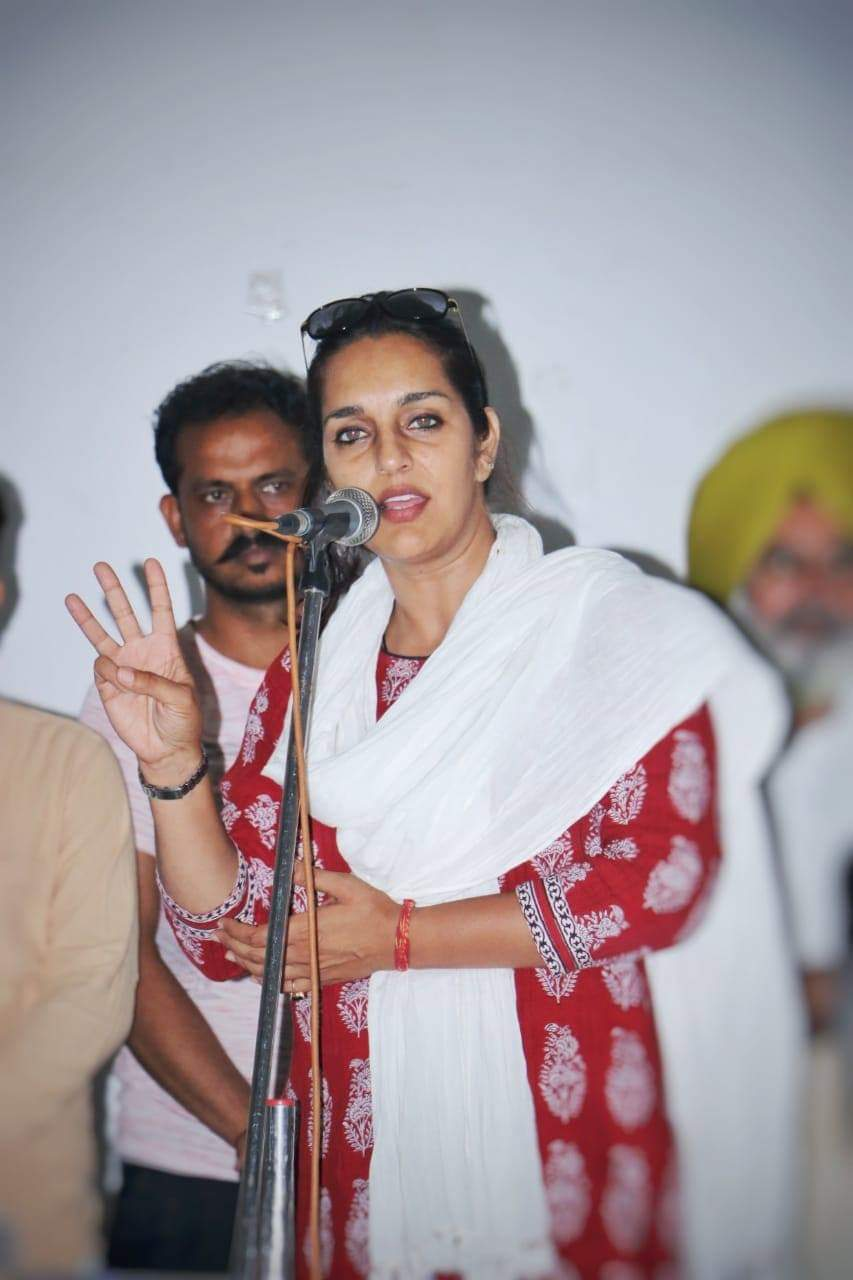
- Born: 18 March 1975 (age 51); Ambala Cantt, Haryana, India
- Occupations: Politician, Social Activist, Designer
- Spouse: Digvijay Singh (m. 2005)
- Children: 2
- Father: Nirmal Singh
- Relatives: Chitrangada Singh (sister-in-law)
- Website: www.chitrasarwara.com

Chitra Sarwara (born 18 March 1975) is an Indian politician. She is a former state vice president of Aam Aadmi Party Haryana. She joined Indian National Congress in January 2024. She is daughter of Nirmal Singh Mohra.

Prior to her position in Congress, Chitra held the post of In charge North Zone, Aam Aadmi Party as Haryana, for nearly 1 year from June 2022 to March 2023. In her tenure AAP Haryana contested and won Zila Parishad Chairman, Zila Parishad members and an overall vote percentage of 13.89% in north zone alone.

Before this, she was National General Secretary Incharge Organization & Treasurer for Haryana Democratic Front-HDF, an independent registered political body in Haryana.

Erstwhile, as an Indian National Congress member, she has served as National General Secretary and Social Media Incharge for All India Mahila Congress. She has also served as Senior Vice President Haryana Pradesh Mahila Congress Committee.

She was elected as a Municipal Corporator of Ambala Municipal Corporation, Haryana, on 13 June 2013.

In October 2019, she contested Vidhan Sabha from Ambala Cantt, Haryana, as an independent candidate and came second garnering more than 44.5 thousand votes.

Chitra contested 2024 Vidhan Sabha election from Ambala Cantt, Haryana as an independent candidate for the second time after being denied the ticket by the Indian National Congress and garnered 52581 votes.

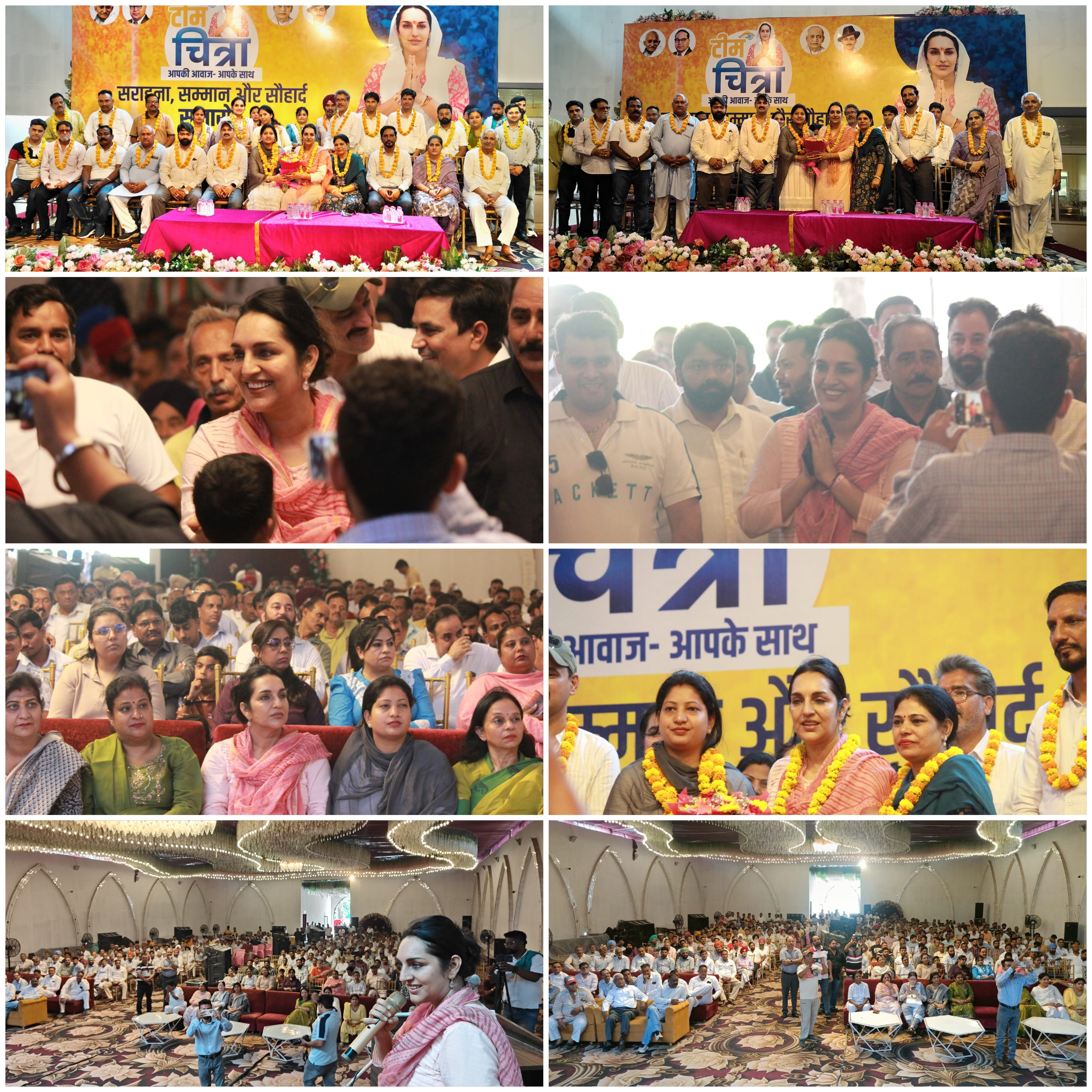
Chitra has launched her own registered political identity by the name of 'TeamChitra' to raise issues affecting public and society.

Chitra Sarwara and her team contested the 2025 Ambala Sadar Municipal Council elections fielding 30 Municipal Council candidates (in 30 out of the 32 wards) and a Chairman candidate also. Four Municipal Council Candidates fielded by her won and the chairman candidate came second with 31968 (34%+) vote share.

Chitra Sarwara floated her registered political identity by the name of '#TeamChitra' to effectively raise people's issues ahead.

== Early life ==
Chitra Sarwara was born on 18 March 1975 in Ambala Cantt, Haryana. She is the daughter of Chaudhary Nirmal Singh Mohra, a five-term member of the Haryana Legislative Assembly from the Naggal Constituency and currently serving Ambala City Constituency, and Naib Kaur. Chitra has three siblings: two younger brothers, Uday Vir Singh and Chetak Singh, and a younger sister, Noor Sarwara.

She did her early schooling at Convent of Jesus and Mary, Ambala and Bhartiya Public School in Ambala Cantt. She later joined and completed her schooling from Motilal Nehru School of Sports, Rai, Sonipat in 1994.

She is an international Volleyball player, having won many State and National titles as a part of the Rai team. She represented Haryana in the National School Volleyball Championship in Purnia, Bihar in 1993 which was won by the Haryana team. She has attended India Camp in Bangalore and represented India against Sri Lanka in 1994 in volleyball matches. She graduated from National Institute of Design, Ahmedabad as an industrial designer specializing in furniture design.

She worked with Tesseract Design in Bangalore and then went on to Idiom Design and Consulting Bangalore. In Delhi, she worked as an independent design consultant and eventually as Design Head of the Delhi office of Idiom Design and Consulting.

While with Idiom Design and Consulting, she was Design Manager for developing the 2010 Commonwealth Games Image and Look program which involved developing the games branding from Logo to application of Image and Look program across city and collaterals.

== Political career ==
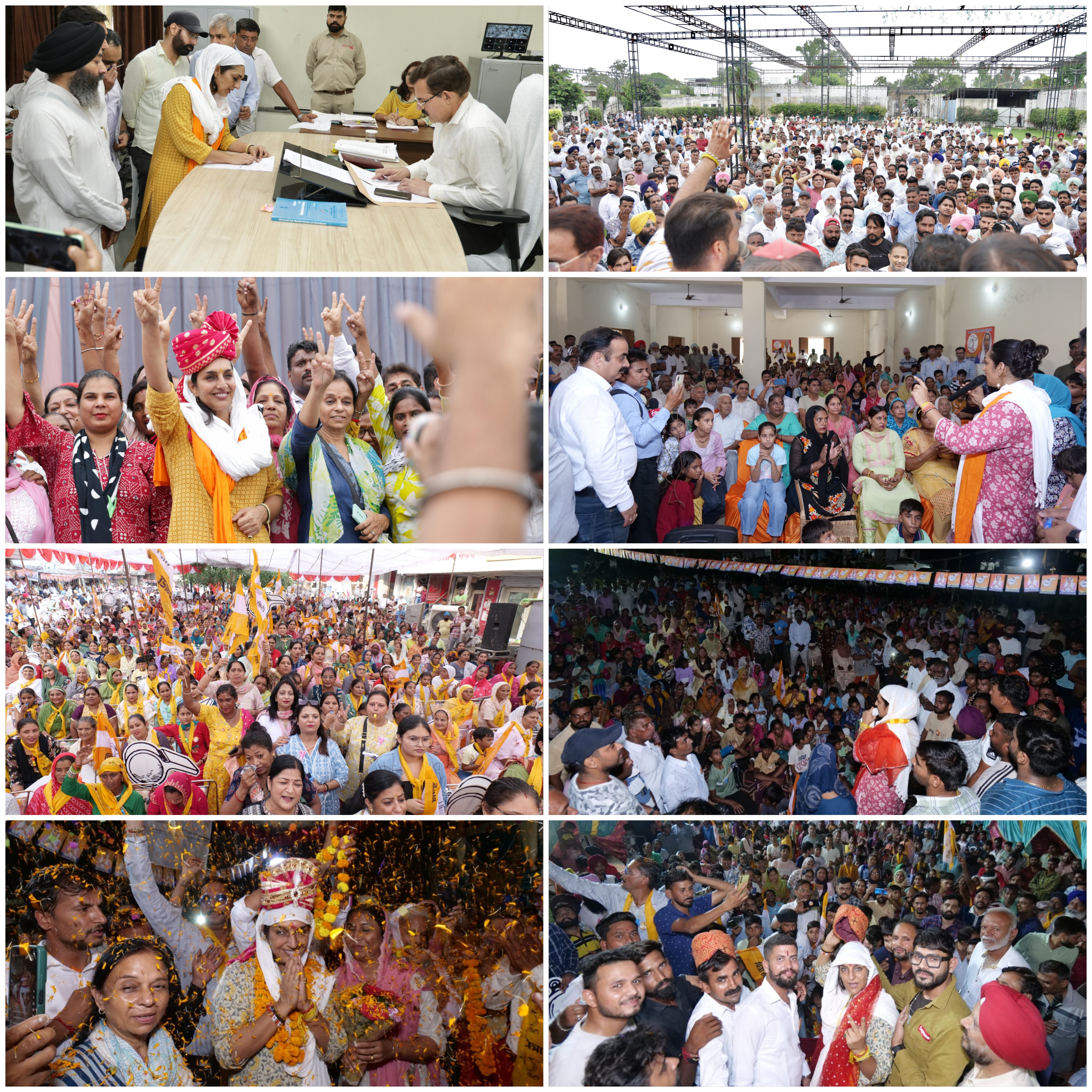
In 2024, when Congress once again denied ticket to Chitra, she filed her nomination as an Independent Candidate and fought election against BJP heavy weight Leader and Haryana Home Minister, Anil Vij. She lost the election by 7,277 votes while in this election, once again, Indian National Congress candidate Forfeited his deposit.

- In 2013, Sarwara was elected as an independent municipal corporator from Ambala Cantt, a newly formed municipal corporation.
- In March 2015, she joined the Haryana Pradesh Mahila Congress Committee as a State Coordinator for Observers & Co-observers of Rohtak-Karnal Division (Minus Bhiwani and Kaithal) and as a spokesperson under the leadership of the dynamic State President Smt. Sumitra Chauhan.
- In May 2015, she organised a massive women's symposium on Martyr's Day, Sh Rajiv Gandhi's death anniversary. "Rajiv Gandhi- Ek Vyaktitav, Ek Soch" was attended by senior state INC leadership and women from Ambala.
- In 2016, she was appointed as the Senior Vice President of the Haryana Pradesh Mahila Congress Committee.
- In 2017, during the tenure of All India Mahila Congress (AIMC) President Smt. Shobha Oza, Sarwara was appointed as Social Media Incharge. She started the first concerted effort by the organisation to build its online presence.

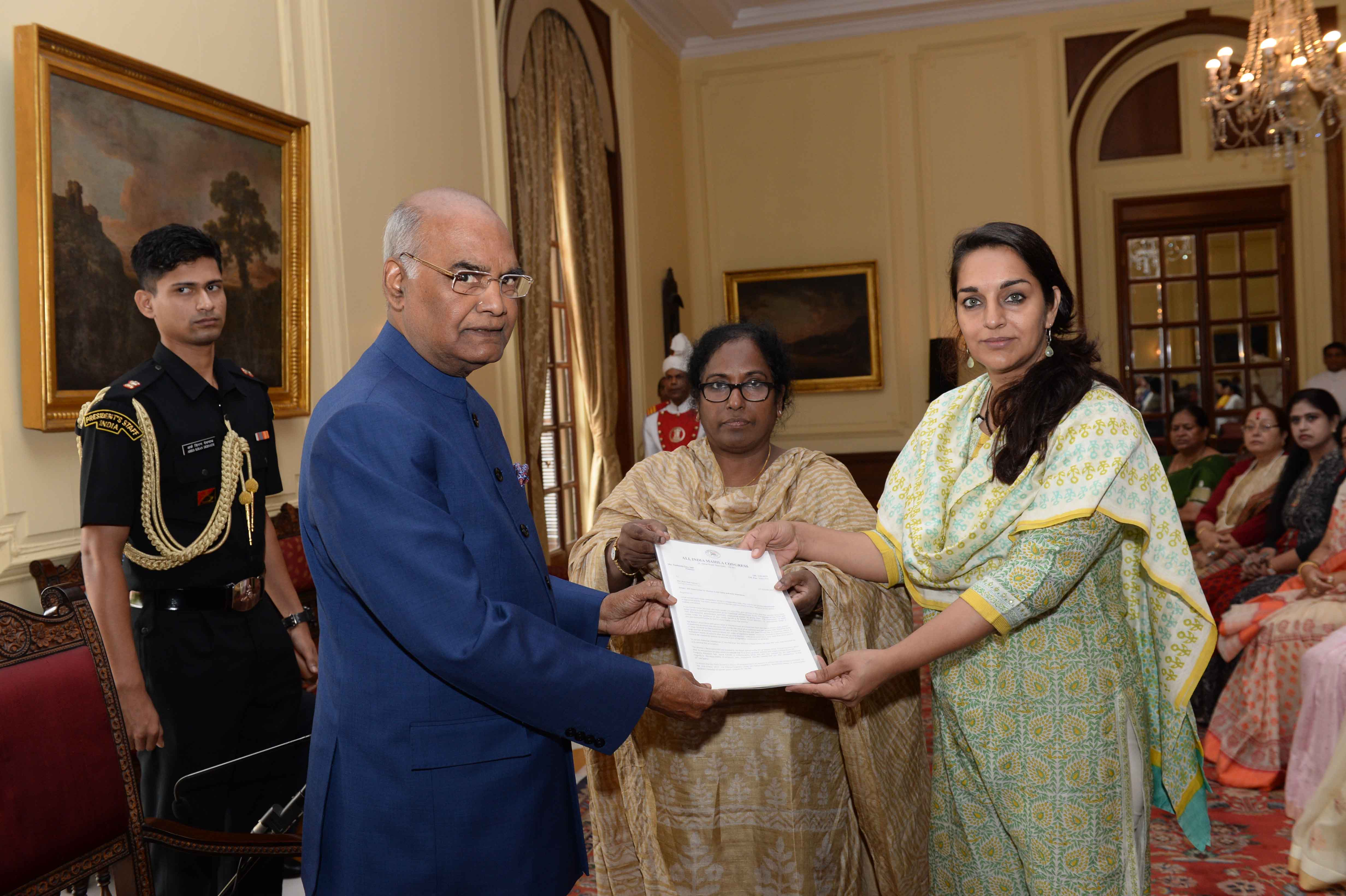
Chitra Handing the #WomenFor33 (Women reservation Bill) Memorandum to former Hon'ble President of India Sh. Ram Nath Govind in New Delhi along with former Rajasthan Mahila Congress President Smt. Rehana Riaz along with Mahila Congress Delegation

- In 2017, the Mahila Congress started a signature campaign, #WomenFor33. More than 10,000 signatures were collected in Ambala for this campaign. Sarwara was part of AIMC delegation led by Sushmita Dev that submitted the signatures collected to the president of India, Sh. Ram Nath Kovind, on 14 October 2017.
- On 13 Dec 2017, the website of the All India Mahila Congress was launched by Indian National Congress President Sh. Rahul Gandhi during The Way Ahead, a Mahila Congress workshop organised by AIMC president Sushmita Dev.

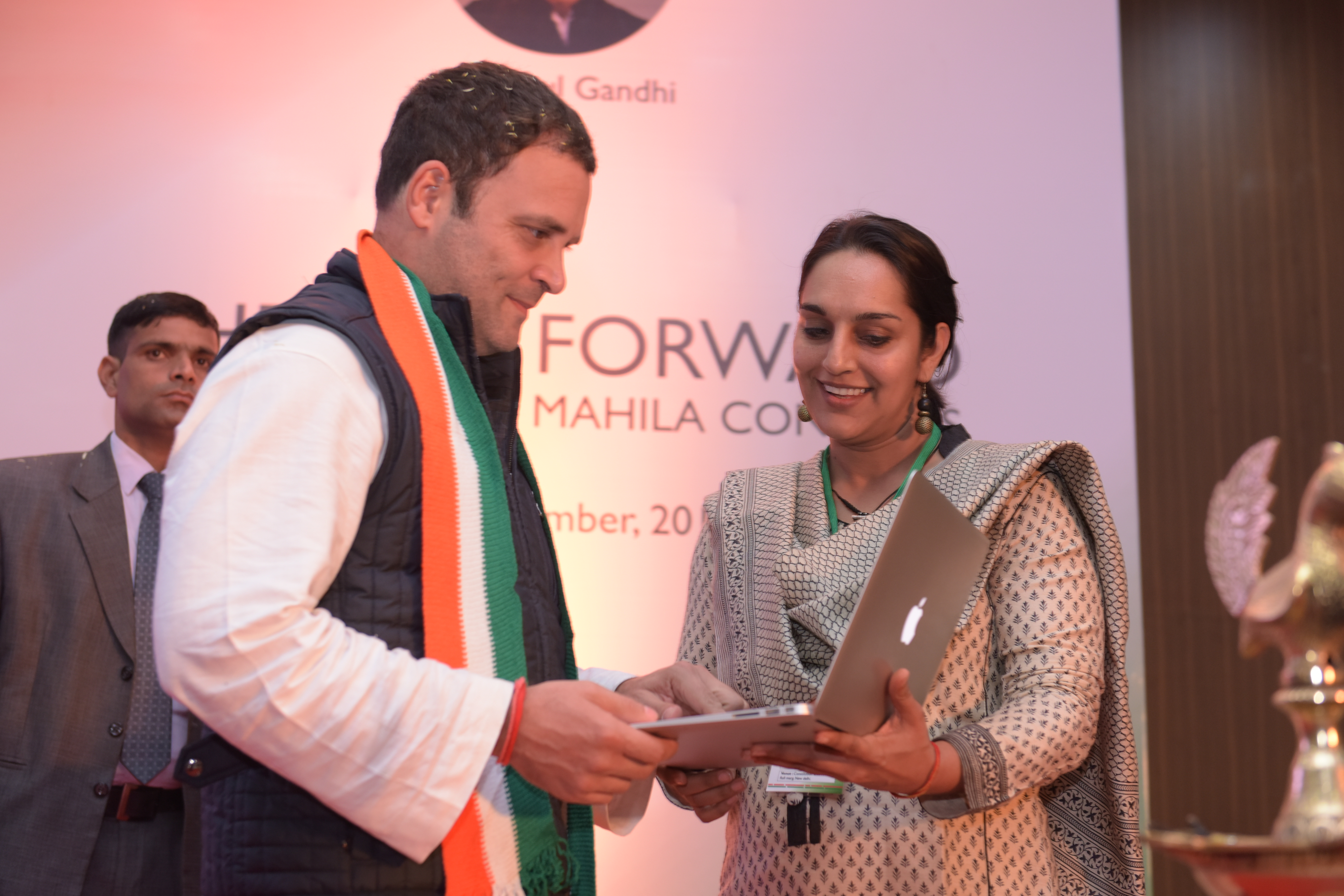
All India Mahila Congress website and social media endeavor led by Ms. Chitra Sarwara launched by Sh. Rahul Gandhi in New Delhi.

- In March 2018, she was appointed as Secretary of the All India Mahila Congress. Sarwara continued the long-standing project of developing an individual identity and logo for the Mahila Congress.
- On 7 August 2018, the Mahila Congress logo and flag was launched by INC President Sh. Rahul Gandhi during the Mahila Adhikaar Sammelan.

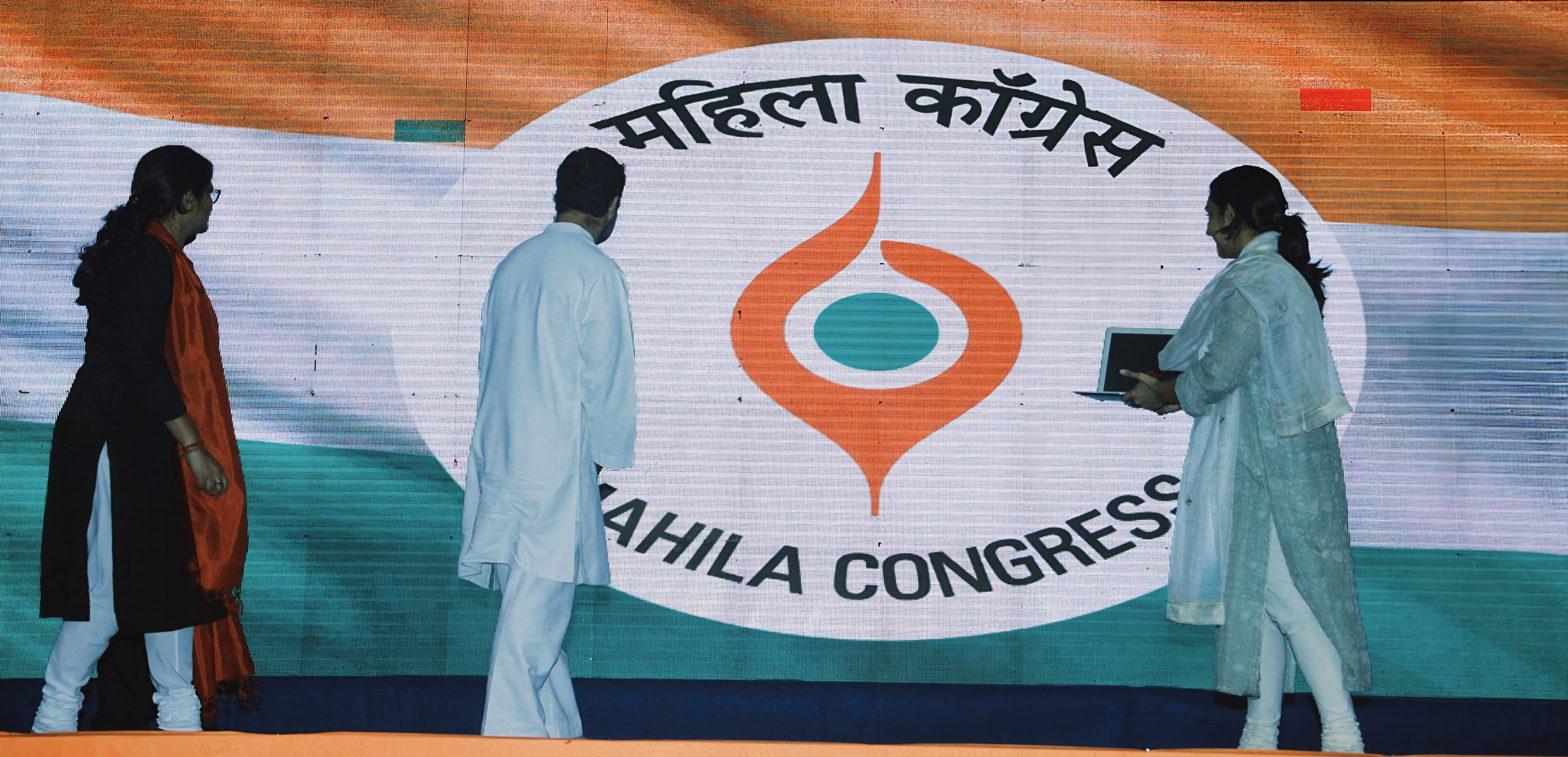
Logo and identity for Mahila Congress was designed by Chitra Sarwara (then Mahila Congress National Gen Sec) and launched by Rahul Gandhi on the Foundation Day of AIMC, 34 year after the foundation of Mahila Congress wing of Indian National Congress.

- On 30 August 2018, Sarwara was appointed as General Secretary of the All India Mahila Congress.
- On 30 September 2018, Sarwara organised women's programs in Ambala as a part of Mahila Adhikaar Yatra.

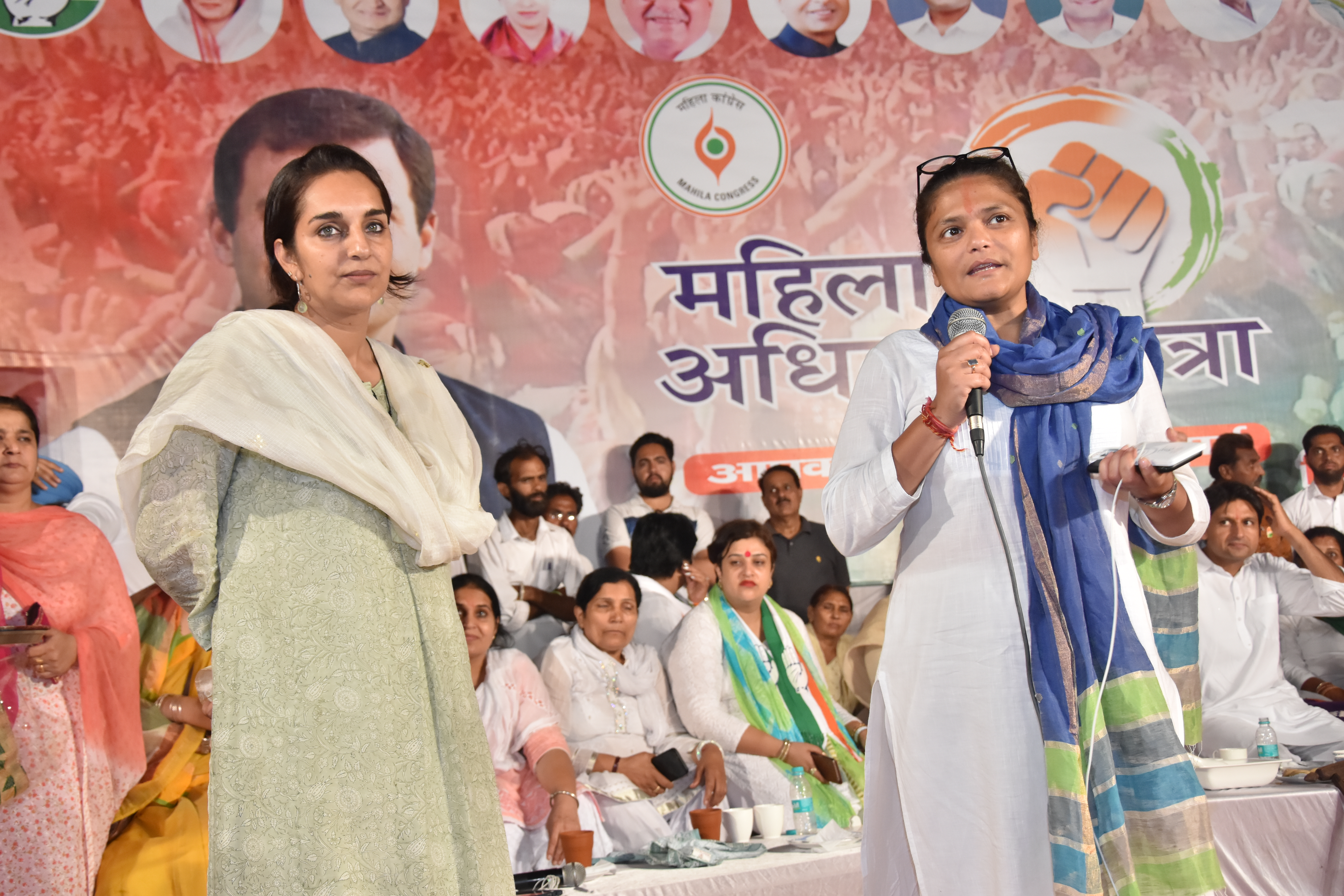
Chitra Organised Mahila Adhikar Yatra program at Village Shahpur, Ambala Cantt, Haryana which was addressed by Former Mahila Congress President Smt. Sushmita Dev and Haryana Congress MP Deepender Singh Hooda.

- In October 2019, after being denied the ticket by the Indian National Congress, Sarwara ran as an independent candidate from Ambala Cantt constituency. She received more than 44 thousand votes, while the Indian National Congress candidate only received 8 thousand votes.
- In December 2019, Sarwara was appointed as National Treasurer of the Haryana Democratic Front.

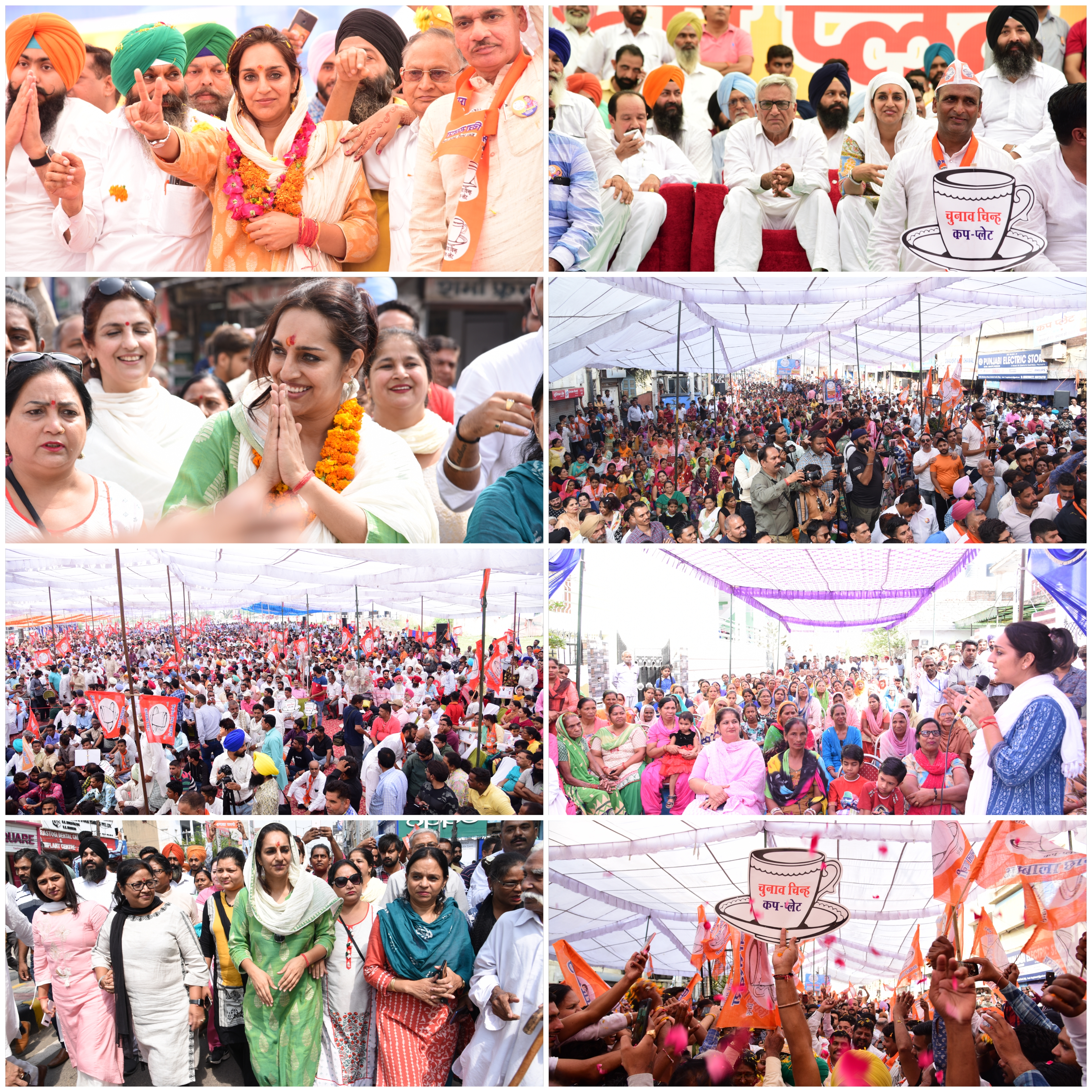
In 2019 Haryana Vidhan Sabha election, Congress denied ticket to Chitra who then filed her nomination as an Independent Candidate and give tough fight to BJP heavy weight Leader Anil Vij. In this election Congress candidate forfeited her deposit.

- In October 2020, she was appointed as National General Secretary and Office Incharge of the Haryana Democratic Front.
- On 29 May 2022, Sarwara was appointed as one of the star campaigners of Aam Aadmi Party for the Municipal Council & Municipal Committee election, which was held on 19 June 2022 across 46 cities of Haryana.
- On 23 June 2022, appointed as Incharge, Aam Aadmi Party North Zone, Haryana.
- In April 2023, appointed as State Vice President, Aam Aadmi Party, Haryana.

Chitra along with thousands of her team members from Ambala Cantt joined back Indian National Congress under leadership of Congress National President Malika Arjun Kharge, Haryana Congress Incharge Deepak Babria, Congress Haryana President Udai Bhan, Former CM Haryana Bhupinder Singh Hooda, MP Deepender Hooda.

- On 5 January, rejoined Indian National Congress.
- In 2024, Chitra executed the 'Ghar Ghar Congress, Har Ghar Congress' campaign, a state wide project of Indian National Congress, across all villages and ward area of Ambala Cantt which was a huge mobilise in favour of the party for the upcoming Lok Sabha election.
- In the 2024 Loksabha Election, Indian National Congress garnered good votes in Ambala Cantt Assembly Constituency with Bhartiya Janta Party barely winning by a slim margin of only 3,277 votes in spite of Ambala being a stronghold of 6 times BJP Ambala Cantt MLA Anil Vij.

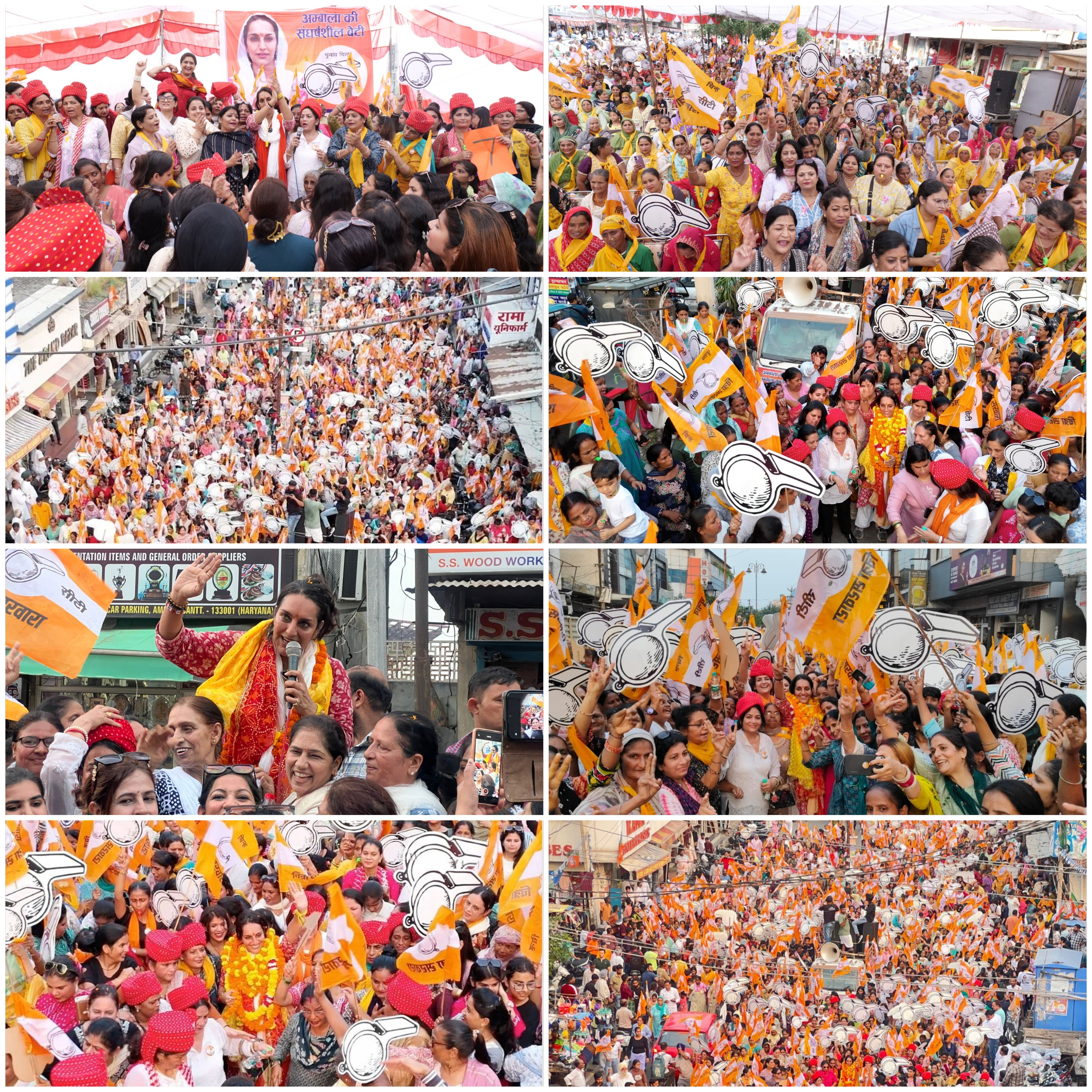
During 2024 Haryana Legislative Assembly election campaign, Chitra organized 'भयमुक्त अम्बाला यात्रा', an all women's rally calling out the terror tactics prevalent in constituency under the then ruling powers.

- In 2024, Chitra contested Vidhan Sabha election from Ambala Cantt, Haryana as an independent candidate for the second time after being denied the ticket by the Indian National Congress and garnered 52581 votes.

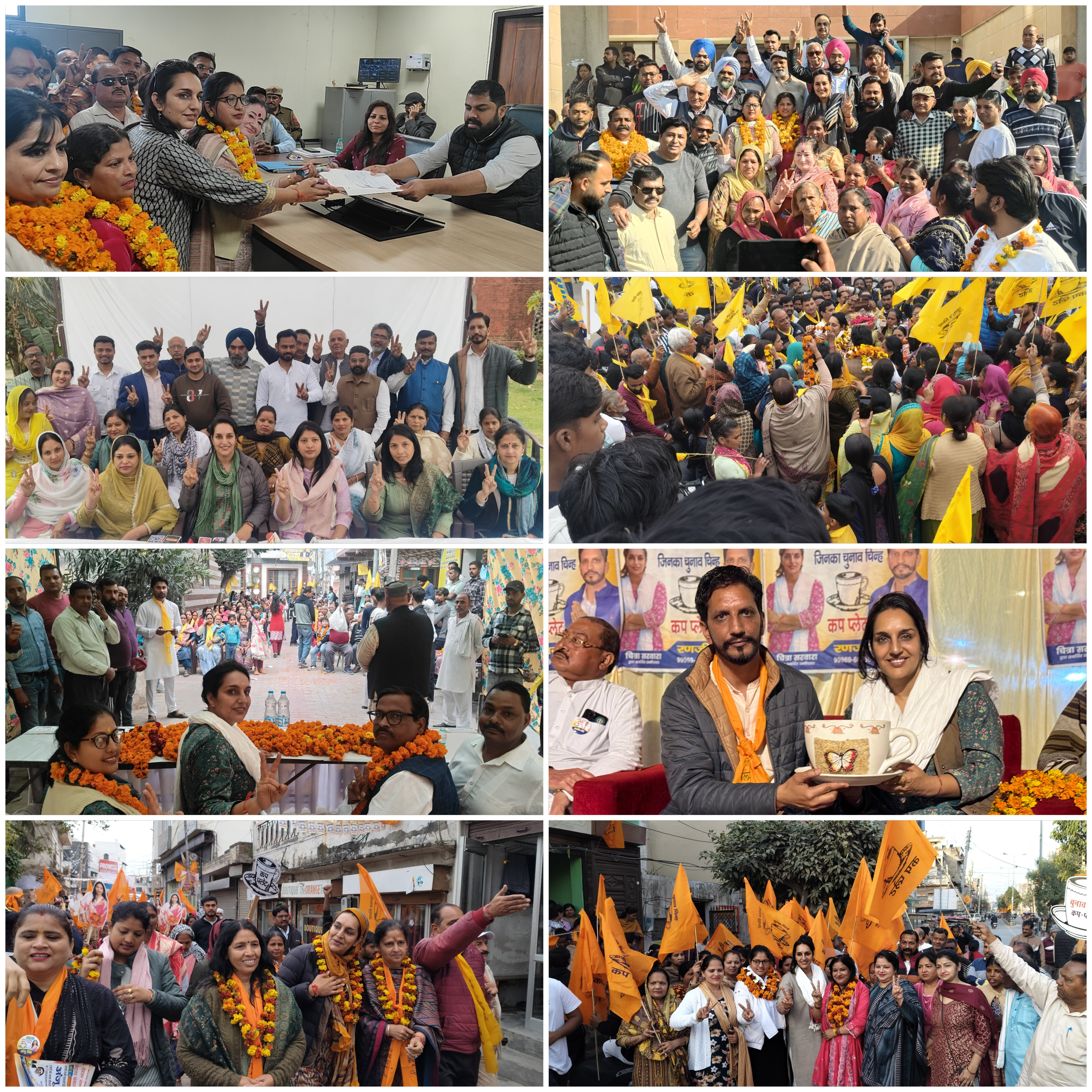
In 2025 Municipal Election Haryana, Chitra fielded 30 Municipal Councilor candidates and a Chairman Candidate on behalf of her front 'Team Chitra' in Ambala Cantt. 4 of her candidates won their respective elections and remaining all stood second place. Her Chairman candidate also stood second with over 34%+ votes. Overall her candidates got 35%+ votes.

- In 2025, Chitra Sarwara and her team contested the Ambala Sadar Municipal Council elections fielding 30 Municipal Council candidates (in 30 out of the 32 wards) and a Chairman candidate also. Four Municipal Council Candidates fielded by her won and the chairman candidate came second with 31968 (34%+) vote share.
- On 8th June 2025, Chitra Sarwara floated her registered political identity by the name of '#TeamChitra' to effectively raise people's issues ahead.

== Personal life ==
Her grandfather Chaudhary Hazara Singh Sarwara was an English and Urdu teacher and her grandmother Chinto Devi was a homemaker. She married Digvijay Singh Chahal, an international professional golfer and Son of Col. Niranjan Singh. The couple has two children, a daughter and a son. Their son was born with a rare and fatal disorder, biliary atresia that would affect and damage his liver completely. In December 2016, when he was merely 8 months old and in need of a liver transplant, Chitra donated her liver (part of it) to her child.

== Social front ==
=== The Light Within ===
The Light Within (TLW) was launched as an informal professional and social networking platform for women in Ambala. The idea was to get women professionals, achievers and contributors from diverse fields to work together, pool efforts and do something to make a difference to improve our lives and society.

Under TLW, organised preparatory workshops in all Ambala Government Senior Secondary Schools were to help students ready for exams with tips and tricks on stress management, memory enhancement and how to attempt exams under this banner.

Organised workshops on menstrual hygiene for distributing free sanitary napkins amongst girl children from financially challenged backgrounds in collaboration with NGOs, Gynecologists and social workers.

Later on, TLW transformed into Nari Shakti with wider base and more widespread activities.

=== iHELP - Welfare Information Helpline ===
iHELP - Welfare Information Helpline was founded in 2013, collaborating with enthusiastic youngsters and Team Suraksha team.

== Social activities ==
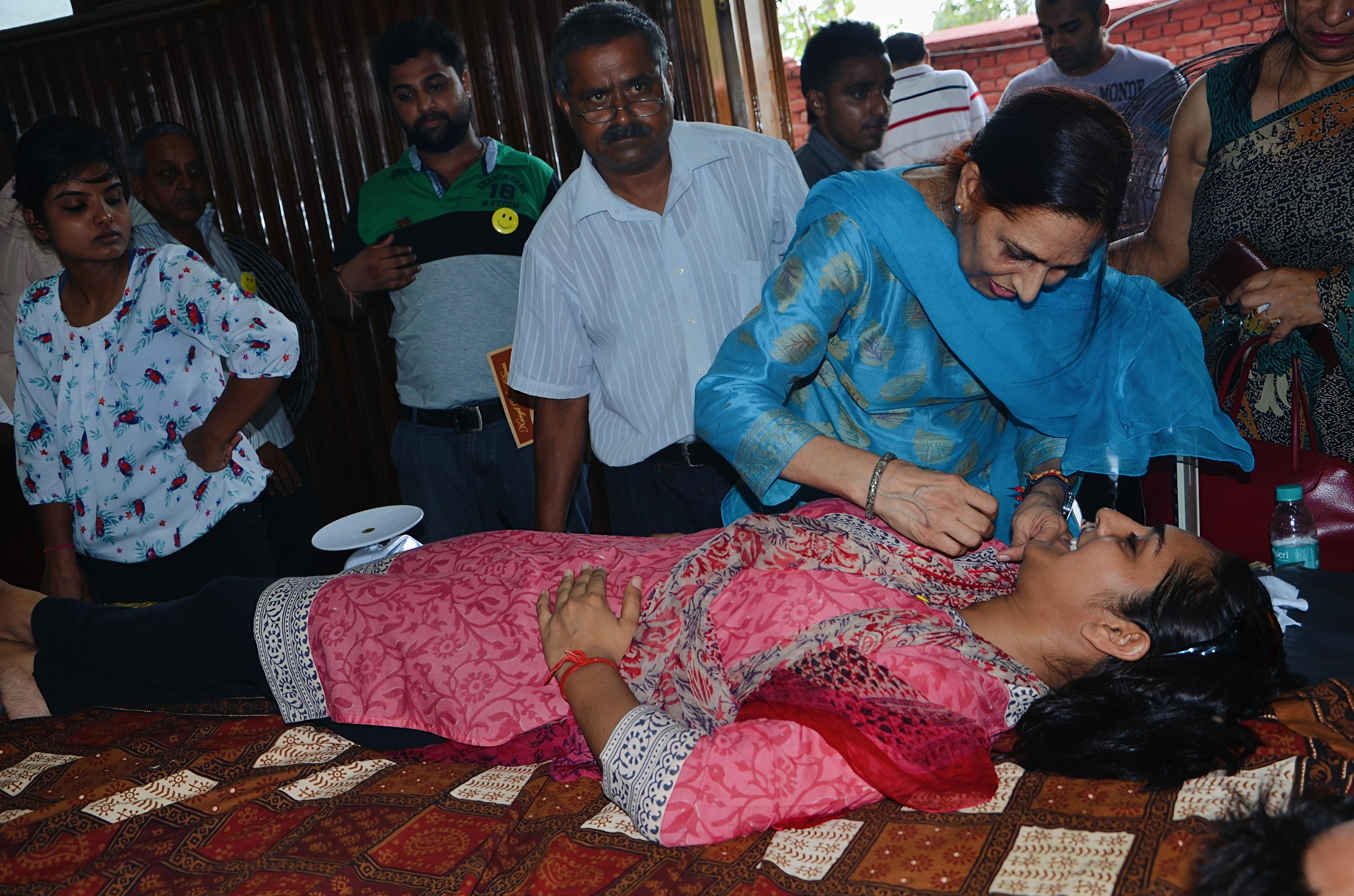
Chitra Organised Blood Donation Camp in Ambala Cantt.

- In July 2014, an INC Ambala team led by Sarwara organised a Blood Donation Camp to honour the Kargil Martryrs. The event collected over 200 bags of blood and Smt. Pratibha Singh, widow of Kargil Martyr Vinay Choudhary, graced the event as the Chief Guest and Indian Army medical team came to collect blood donations themselves.
- On 20 Aug 2017, Sarwara helped private hospital to organize an eye checkup camp in Village Machhonda.
- In Aug 2018, she organized a flood relief Camp for Kerala. The two day donation camp saw Ambala turn out in massive numbers to participate.

An avid sports, Yoga and fitness enthusiast, Chitra Promoting Yoga in Ambala Cantt.

- In 2018, Sarwara organised various camps in Ambala Cantt to educate women on menstrual hygiene.
- On Yoga Day of 2019, Sarwara, along with Poonam Sangwan, organised a yoga camp in the village of Shahpur in Ambala Cantt.
- In July 2023, Ambala was hit by a heavy flood which covered almost all the urban areas as well as villages of Ambala Cantt. Sarwara visited all the areas and tried to help people stuck in houses due to the water logging.
- In July 2023, Sarwara along with her team tried to supply drinking water and provide food to the people which were affected due to the flood.

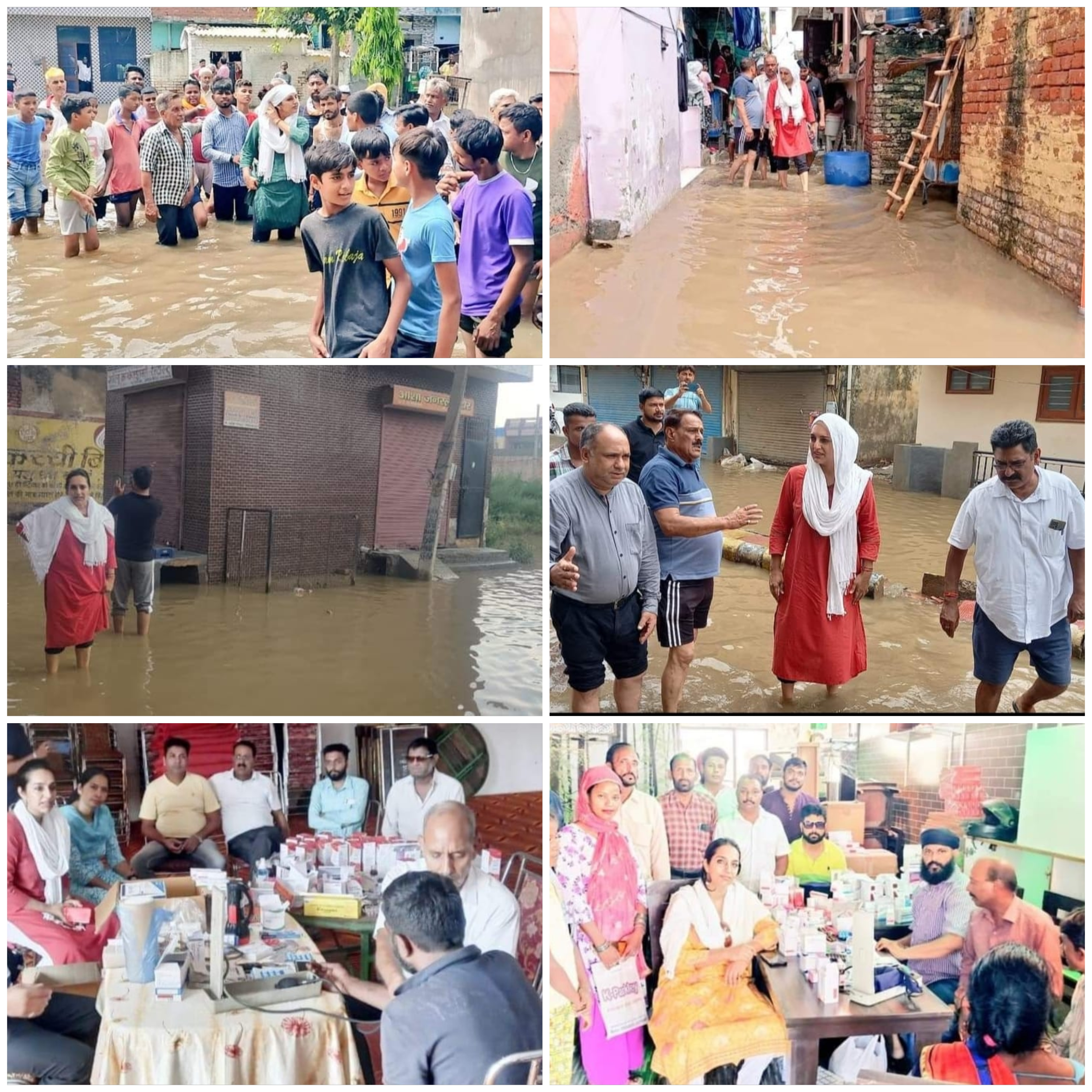
When Ambala Cantt got hit by heavy flood. Chitra visited all flood effected areas and tried to help citizens with her team. Chitra organized Medical camps, distributed food and water, organized claim camps in affected areas.

- In August 2023, Sarwara organised various medical camps in the flood affected areas.
- In August- September 2025, Ambala was hit again by a heavy floods again which affected almost all the areas of Ambala Cantt assembly lying next to the river. Sarwara visited affected areas of Ambala Cantt and tried to help those affected due to flooding and water logging in their houses and businesses.
- In September 2025, Sarwara along with her #TeamChitra worked towards providing cooked food, milk, water in flood affected areas of Ambala Cantt. Chitra also organised medical camp in the affected area.

== Positions held ==
- July 2013-July 2018: Elected municipal corporator, Ambala Municipal Corporation, Haryana.
- 2014: Appointed Member District level Vigilance Committee for PDS and Chairman Social welfare and Pensions ad hoc Committee.
- 2015: Appointed State Coordinator for Observers and Co-observers & Spokesperson, Haryana Pradesh Mahila Congress Committee.
- 2015: Appointed Incharge of Karnal and Rohtak Divisions (minus Kaithal and Bhiwani) in Haryana Pradesh Mahila Congress Committee.
- 2016: Appointed Senior Vice President, Haryana Pradesh Mahila Congress Committee.
- 2017: Appointed Incharge, Social Media, All India Mahila Congress.
- Mar 2018: Appointed Secretary, All India Mahila Congress, Incharge Social Media.
- Aug 2018: Appointed General Secretary, All India Mahila Congress, Incharge Social Media.
- December 2019: Appointed National Treasurer, Haryana Democratic Front.
- Oct 2020: Appointed National General Secretary and Office Incharge, Haryana Democratic Front.

Chitra joined Aam Aadami Party under the leadership of Arvind Kejriwal.

- April 2022: Joined Aam Aadmi Party under the aegis of Arvind Kejriwal.
- May 2022: Appointed as State Star Campaigner for Municipal Corporation/Council Election, Haryana.
- June 2022: Appointed as Incharge of Aam Aadmi Party North Zone Haryana. North Zone consist districts Panchkula, Ambala, Yamunanagar, Kurukshetra, Kaithal, Karnal. Which covers 3 Loksabha Seats and 24 Vidhansabha Seats of Haryana.
- April 2023: Appointed as Aam Aadmi Party State Vice President, Haryana.

== Agitations ==
- In February 2015, Sarwara took part in a Kisaan Andolan called by Rahul Gandhi against land acquisition bill changes proposed by the BJP government.
- In March 2015, she took part in a candle march protest 'Meri Beti Mera Gaurav' against female foeticide organised by Danik Bhaskar.
- In April 2015, she protested in Chandigarh against the misgovernance of Haryana government.
- In June 2015, she took part in a protest against 1 year of Narendra Modi government in Delhi.
- In September 2016, she led a women's protest in Ambala against the price rise of LPG, petrol and diesel.
- In March 2017, she took part in protest organised by Ambala Congress against false promise of BJP government to bring back Black Money.
- On 14 May 2017, she took part in protest against BJP government in Chandigarh for increase in crimes against women in Haryana.
- On 23 June 2017, she participated in a protest organised in Ambala with small scale business owners against implementation of the Goods and Services Tax.
- In July 2017, she participated in a protest against no legal action against the son of Subhash Barala, the BJP Haryana chief, accused of stalking a girl.
- On 25 July 2017, she joined a sansad gherao protest on completion 3 years of central government.
- On 6 August 2017, she organized a protest march in Ambala Cantt along with the Mahila Congress unit of Ambala against no arrests in the stalking case of the son of the BJP Haryana chief.
- In August 2017, she protested outside house of Ambala Lok Sabha MP Rattan Lal Kataria, against his sexist comments on INC women leader Selja Kumari.
- On 8 November 2017, she protested on the anniversary of the 2016 Indian banknote demonetisation.
- On 14 December 2017, she protested against election commission.
- On 19 December 2017, she protested outside the Municipal Cooperation against the lack of development in Ambala.
- On 9 December 2017, she participated in a protest organised by citizens to get justice for a 5-year girl raped and brutally murdered in Boh Village, Ambala Cantt.
- On 17 January 2018, she protested in Chandigarh against the Manohar Lal Khattar government on the various rape cases in Haryana.
- On 17 February 2018, she joined a protest against Haryana government organized by Anganwadi workers.
- On 4 March 2018, she participated in a fast for peace and harmony.
- On 8 March 2018, she protested outside parliament demanding passage of the #WomenFor33 Bill.
- On 15 March 2018, she protested in Ambala to demand action against nephew of the minister for Health & Sport of Haryana, accused of fraud.
- On 21 March 2018, she participated in a candle march in Ambala Cantt against the central government failing to bring back 39 Indians from Iraq.
- On 28 March 2018, she took part in the Jan Aakrosh Rally.
- On 4 April 2018, she participated in Save Democracy Day.
- In April 2018, she protested outside Divisional Railway Manager office against the delay in the railway over bridge project.
- On 16 May 2018, she protested against the Haryana government's decision of a Corporation breach along with INC Ambala team.
- On 29 May 2018, she took part in the Vishwasghat Diwas.

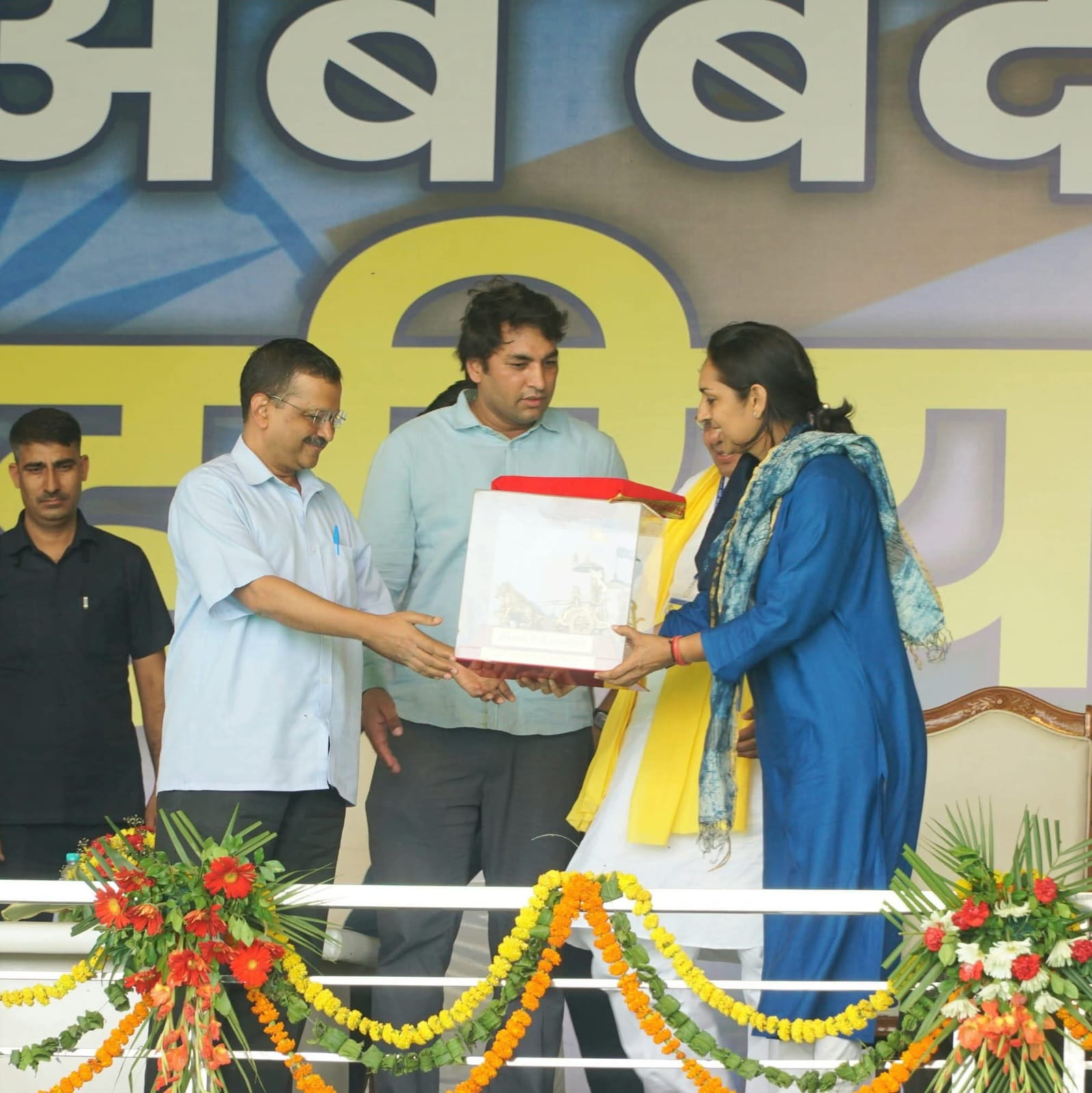
Chitra played a Vital role in 'Ab Badlega Haryana's rally of Aam Aadmi Party organised in Kurukshetra which was headed by National Convenor Arvind Kejriwal.

- In August 2018, she participated in the Mahila Aakrosh Rally.
- On 10 September 2018, she organized a protest with the Ambala Congress team against the price rise of LPG, petrol, and diesel.
- In September 2018, there was the Bharat Band agitation, where she protested against the Central Bureau of Investigation, working as a puppet for the Narendra Modi government.
- On 4 February 2019, she took part in the HPMC protest at Chandigarh against an accused who said inappropriate comments regarding Smt. Priyanka Gandhi.
- On 16 February 2019, she led a candle march at Ambala Cantt for the Martyrs of the Pulwama attack.
- In March 2019, she took part in Kala Diwas.
- In August 2020, she led a protest in Ambala Cantt for the fuel price rise.
- In August 2020, she led a protest against three farm laws at village Mandour, Ambala Cantt.
- In September 2020, she led a protest in Ambala City for the fuel price hike.
- In October 2020, she led a protest against three farm laws at Deputy Commissioner office, Ambala City.
- In March 2022, she led a protest against corruption in construction work at Municipal Corporation, Ambala City.
- In April 2022, she led a protest of corruption in construction of International Football Stadium, Ambala Cantt. This was Chitra's first protest after joining the Aam Aadmi Party.
- On 29 May 2022, Chitra along with his father Nirmal Singh and brother Udayvir Singh played a vital role in organising the 'Ab Badlega Haryana' rally at Braham sarovar, Kurukshetra which launched Aam Aadmi Party in Haryana for the 2024 Vidhansabha bid. The father-daughter duo pulled an estimated crowd of nearly 25,000 from assemblies of Ambala Cantt, Ambala City, Jagadhri, Mullana, Gulha Cheeka, Pehowa, Radaur, Sadhaura and various areas of Kurukshetra lokshabha to this rally.
- In August 2022, she led an AAP protest against the decision of Haryana Government to close the various government schools in Haryana.
- In November 2022, she led an AAP protest outside Municipal Council, Ambala Cantt against wrong NDC and Property ID issued by the government.
- In November 2022, she led an Akrosh March at Ambala City against the unlawful arrest of Aam Aadmi Party Chairman Candidate Makhan Singh Labana in Zila Parishad Ambala.
- In November 2022, she led a protest outside CIA-1 police station office at Ambala Cantt against the unlawful custody of Aam Aadmi Party Chairman Candidate Makhan Singh Lagana in Zila Parishad Ambala.
- On 18 December 2022, she led a road show in Ambala on the occasion of Aam Aadmi Party getting the status of a national party.
- On 8 February 2023, she led a protest against the BJP Government for helping Adani and Ambani at Manav Chowk, Ambala City.
- On 13 February 2023, Dharna Pardarshan at Karnal along with Anurag Dhanda ji against sports minster Haryana Sandeep Singh, accused of molestation charges.
- On 15 February 2023, she joined Dharna Pardharshan along with a team in nearly 150 cars in Panchkula supporting harassment allegations against sports minister Haryana Sandeep Singh and calling for justice.
- On 22 February 2023, she took part in protest against the arrest of Manish Sisodiya ji at Hisar.
- On 2 March 2023, she led a team to Panchkula to give support to the Sarpanch agitation.
- On 3 March 2023, she led a protest at Ambala Cantt against price rise and the Sarpanch lathi charge.
- On 24 March 2023, she led a protest at Yamunanagar along with AAP Jagadhri leader Adarsh Pal for #ModiHataoDeshBachaho. During this protest, Chitra was arrested.
- On 3 May 2023, Chitra was member of Delegation led by Arvind Kejriwal which met the wrestlers protesting at Jantar Mantar against the alleged sexual harassment.
- On 5 May 2023, she led a protest candle march at Ambala Cantt in support of wrestlers against the BJP MP Brij Bhushan Singh.
- On 13 May 2023, she joined a protest against BJP Government at Karnal with AAP Haryana Senior Vice President Anurag Dhanda.
- On 8 June 2023, she took part in Tiranga Yatra along with her team at Jind under the leadership of AAP Convener Arvind Kejriwal and Punjab CM Bhagwant Mann.
- On 3 July 2023, she took part in all opposition party Dharna Pardarshan for the support of Rehdi Fhadi Association at Ambala City.
- On 28 August 2023, Chitra, along with Nirmal Singh, led a Huge Bijli Andolan March in the Ambala district.

Chitra initiated a highly viral campaign titled 'Khadda-Yatra' to highlight the poor condition of Ambala Cantt roads.

- On 1 October 2023, Chitra started a unique protest called "khadda yatra" against the poor condition of roads in Ambala Cantt. This yatra was initiated from Mahesh Nagar area to village Babyal of Ambala Cantt.
- On 8 October 2023, on the demand of the people of village Boh, a second "khadda yatra" was organized. People came insupport for this yatra due to the poor condition of roads since 3 years. Subsequent "khadda yatras" were carried out in different areas of Ambala Cantt.

Chitra was the face of the 10 day long 'Badlav Yatra' in 24 assemblies of North Haryana.

- On 16 November 2023, Chitra took part in the Dharna Pradarshan at the deputy commissioner office, Yamunanagar, against the deaths due to illegal liquor consumption.
- On 15 December 2023, Chitra led a 10 day long Badlav Yatra for Aam Aadmi Party in 24 assemblies of North Haryana, starting from Kalka and ending in rural Panipat.

== Elections contested ==
=== Ambala Municipal Corporation ===
Year	Ward No.	Party	Result	Vote percentage	Opposition Candidate	Opposition Party	Opposition vote percentage
2013	Ward No. 16	Independent	Won	51.2%	Gurjinder Kaur	BJP	30.4%

=== Haryana Legislative Assembly ===
Year	Constituency	Party	Result	Vote percentage	Opposition Candidate	Opposition Party	Opposition vote percentage	Third Candidate	Third Candidate Party	Third Candidate Vote percentage
2019	Ambala Cantt	Independent	Lost	36.5%	Anil Vij	BJP	53%	Venu Aggarwal	INC	7%
2024	Ambala Cantt	Independent	Lost	40.44%	Anil Vij	BJP	43.90%	Parminder Singh Pari	INC	10.91%
