= Phool Chand Mullana =

Indian lawyer, politician (1941–2026)

Member of the Haryana Legislative Assembly
- In office 2005–2009
- Preceded by: Rishal Singh
- Succeeded by: Rajbir Singh
- In office 1991–1996
- Preceded by: Suraj Bhan
- Succeeded by: Rishal Singh
- In office 1982–1987
- Preceded by: Sher Singh
- Succeeded by: Suraj Bhan
- In office 1972–1977
- Preceded by: Ram Parkash
- Succeeded by: Sher Singh
- Constituency: Mulana

Cabinet Minister, Government of Haryana
- In office 2005–2009

President of Haryana Pradesh Congress Committee
- In office 27 August 2007 – 10 February 2014
- Preceded by: Bhajan Lal Bishnoi
- Succeeded by: Ashok Tanwar

Personal details
- Born: 6 April 1941 Milak Khas, Punjab Province, British India
- Died: 20 November 2026 (aged 85) India
- Party: Indian National Congress
- Spouse: Pushpa Devi (deceased)
- Children: 2, including Varun Chaudhary
- Occupation: Lawyer; politician

Phool Chand Mullana (6 April 1941 – 20 November 2026) was an Indian lawyer and politician. He was elected four times as MLA (in 1972, 1982, 1991 and 2005) from Ambala District to Mulana Assembly constituency.

== Early life and education ==
Phool Chand Mullana was born on 6 April 1941 in Milak Khas, Punjab, British India. He completed his education with a Bachelor of Arts and Bachelor of Laws.

== Political career ==
Phool Chand Mullana was elected four times as a Member of the Legislative Assembly (MLA) from the Mulana Assembly constituency in Ambala district, Haryana, in 1972, 1982, 1991 and 2005.

He served as a cabinet minister in the Government of Haryana and handled several portfolios, including Revenue, Public Works Department (PWD), Education, Forest, and Technical Education. He was awarded Haryana Ratan in 2005 for his contribution to the politics and social welfare of Haryana.

He also served as the President of the Haryana Pradesh Congress Committee from 2007 to 2014.

== Personal life ==
His son, Varun Chaudhary, is serving as a Member of Parliament of the 18th Lok Sabha representing Ambala.

His daughter, Kalpana Kataria, is an Indian Revenue Officer and serves as Commissioner of Income Tax. His son-in-law, Rajender Kataria, is an Indian Administrative Service (IAS) officer and is currently working as Secretary to the Government of Karnataka, Department of Agriculture, Horticulture and Sericulture.

His daughter-in-law Pooja Chaudhary is currently serving as a Member of the Legislative Assembly from the Mulana Assembly constituency. He died on 20 November 2026, aged 85.
