= Aman Kumar Nagra =

Indian politician (born 1955)

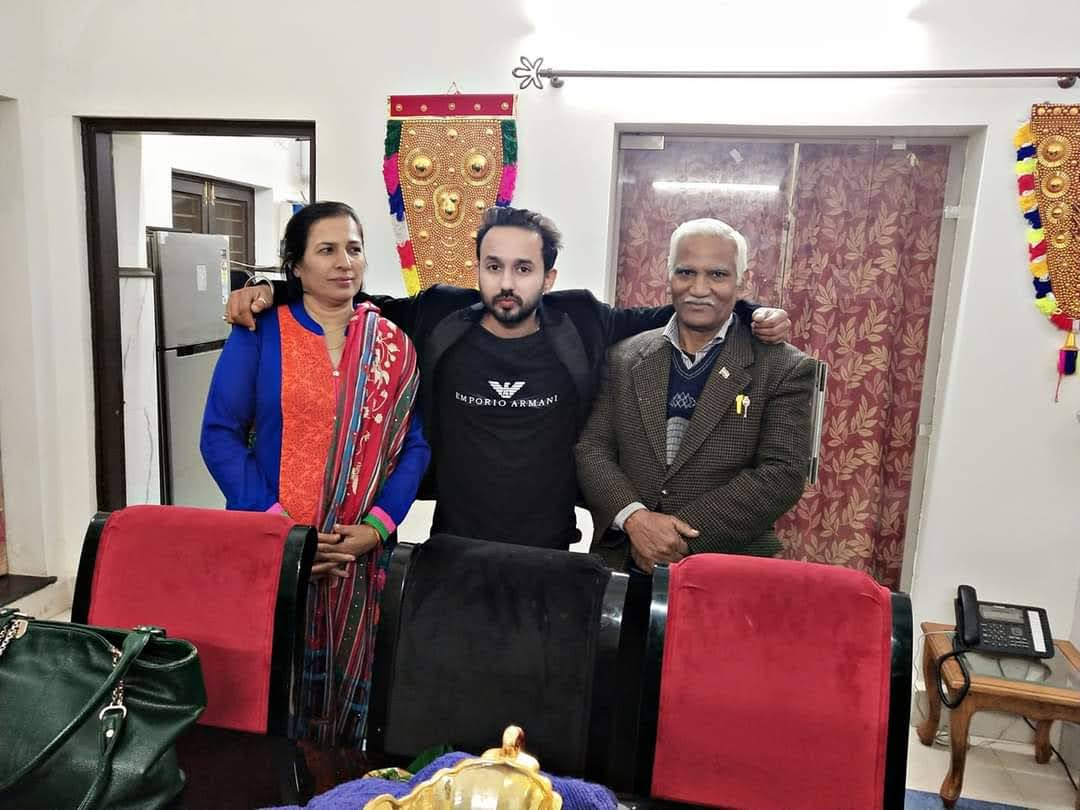

Member of Lok Sabha
- In office 1998–1999
- Preceded by: Suraj Bhan
- Succeeded by: Rattan Lal Kataria
- Constituency: Ambala

Personal details
- Born: 10 May 1955 (age 70) Tapu Kamalpur, Yamuna Nagar district
- Party: Manav Samaj Seva Party
- Other political affiliations: Bahujan Samaj Party; Haryana Vikas Party
- Spouse: Pushpa Nagra (Meera)
- Education: M.A.(political science)
- Alma mater: Mukand Lal National College
- Profession: Social worker

Aman Kumar Nagra (born 10 May 1955 at Tapu Kamalpur, Yamuna Nagar district) was member of 12th Lok Sabha from Ambala constituency in Haryana as member of Bahujan Samaj Party. He defeated Suraj Bhan of Bharatiya Janata Party by 2,864 votes in the 1998 Lok Sabha elections. He founded the Manav Samaj Seva Party on 12 May 2002.
