= Ambala Lok Sabha constituency =

Lok Sabha constituency in Haryana

Coordinates: 30.377°N 76.775°E

Ambala HR-1
- Lok Sabha constituency
- Interactive Map Outlining Ambala Lok Sabha constituency

Constituency details
- Country: India
- Region: North India
- State: Haryana
- Assembly constituencies: Kalka; Panchkula; Naraingarh; Ambala Cantt. Ambala City; Mulana; Sadhaura; Jagadhri; Yamunanagar
- Established: 1952
- Reservation: SC

Member of Parliament
- 18th Lok Sabha
- Incumbent Varun Chaudhary
- Party: INC
- Alliance: INDIA
- Elected year: 2024

Ambala Lok Sabha constituency is one of the 10 Lok Sabha (parliamentary) constituencies in the Haryana state in northern India. This constituency covers the entire Panchkula and Ambala districts and part of Yamunanagar district. It is reserved for the Scheduled caste candidates.

== Assembly segments ==
Ambala Lok Sabha constituency comprises nine Vidhan Sabha (legislative assembly) constituencies. These are:

#	Name	District	Member	Party	Leading (in 2024)
1	Kalka	Panchkula	Shakti Rani Sharma	BJP	BJP
2	Panchkula	Panchkula	Chander Mohan	INC	BJP
3	Naraingarh	Ambala	Shalley Chaudhary	INC	INC
4	Ambala Cantt.	Ambala	Anil Vij	BJP	BJP
5	Ambala City	Ambala	Nirmal Singh	INC	INC
6	Mulana (SC)	Ambala	Pooja Chaudhary	INC	INC
7	Sadhaura (SC)	Yamunanagar	Renu Bala	INC	INC
8	Jagadhri	Yamunanagar	Akram Khan	INC	INC
9	Yamunanagar	Yamunanagar	Ghanshyam Dass	BJP	BJP

== Members of Parliament ==
Year	Winner	Party
1952	Tek Chand	Indian National Congress
1957	Subhadra Joshi	Indian National Congress
1957	Chuni Lal	Indian National Congress
1962	Chuni Lal	Indian National Congress
1967	Suraj Bhan	Bharatiya Jana Sangh
1971	Ram Prakash Chaudhary	Indian National Congress
1977	Suraj Bhan	Janata Party
1980	Suraj Bhan	Janata Party
1984	Ram Prakash Chaudhary	Indian National Congress
1989	Ram Prakash Chaudhary	Indian National Congress
1991	Ram Prakash Chaudhary	Indian National Congress
1996	Suraj Bhan	Bharatiya Janata Party
1998	Aman Kumar Nagra	Bahujan Samaj Party
1999	Rattan Lal Kataria	Bharatiya Janata Party
2004	Selja Kumari	Indian National Congress
2009	Selja Kumari	Indian National Congress
2014	Rattan Lal Kataria	Bharatiya Janata Party
2019	Rattan Lal Kataria	Bharatiya Janata Party
2024	Varun Chaudhary	Indian National Congress

== Election results ==
=== 2024 ===
2024 Indian general election: Ambala
Party	Candidate	Votes	%	±%
INC	Varun Chaudhary	663,657	49.28	▲18.57
BJP	Banto Kataria	6,14,621	45.64	▼11.8
BSP	Pawan Randhawa	32,337	2.40	▼4.92
INLD	Gurpreet Singh	8,986	0.67	▼0.82
JJP	Kiran Punia	6,092	0.45	
NOTA	None of the above	6,452	0.48	▼0.12
Majority		49,036	3.64	▼22.37
Turnout		13,48,094	67.29	▼3.71
INC gain from BJP		Swing		

=== 2019 ===
2019 Indian general elections: Ambala
Party	Candidate	Votes	%	±%
BJP	Rattan Lal Kataria	746,508	56.72	▲6.55
INC	Selja Kumari	4,04,163	30.71	▲8.41
BSP	Dr. Kapoor Singh	96,296	7.32	▼1.09
INLD	Ram Pal	19,575	1.49	▼9.13
Majority		3,42,345	26.01	▼1.86
Turnout		13,17,922	71.10	▼0.93
BJP hold		Swing		

=== 2014 ===
2014 Indian general elections: Ambala
Party	Candidate	Votes	%	±%
BJP	Rattan Lal Kataria	612,121	50.17	▲14.67
INC	Raj Kumar Balmiki	2,72,047	22.30	▼14.89
INLD	Dr. Kusum Sherwal	1,29,571	10.62	N/A
BSP	Dr. Kapoor Singh	1,02,627	8.41	▼13.35
AAP	Surinder Pal Singh	63,626	5.21	New
NOTA	None of the Above	7,816	0.64	N/A
Majority		3,40,074	27.87	▲26.18
Turnout		12,18,995	72.03	▲3.52
BJP gain from INC		Swing	▲12.98	

=== 2009 ===
2009 Indian general elections: Ambala
Party	Candidate	Votes	%	±%
INC	Selja Kumari	322,258	37.17	
BJP	Rattan Lal Kataria	3,07,688	35.49	
BSP	Chander Pal	1,88,608	21.76	
HJC(BL)	Dalvir Singh	30,689	3.54	
Majority		14,570	1.68	
Turnout		8,66,630	68.51	▼2.18
INC hold		Swing		

== See also ==
- Ambala district
- List of constituencies of the Lok Sabha
