= Varun Chaudhary =

Indian politician

Member of Parliament, Lok Sabha
- Incumbent
- Assumed office 4 June 2024
- Preceded by: Rattan Lal Kataria
- Constituency: Ambala

Member of Haryana Legislative Assembly
- In office November 2019 – June 2024
- Preceded by: Santosh Chauhan Sarwan
- Succeeded by: Pooja Chaudhary
- Constituency: Mulana

Personal details
- Born: 23 March 1980 (age 46) Ambala, Haryana, India
- Party: Indian National Congress
- Spouse: Pooja Chaudhary
- Children: 2
- Parent: Phool Chand Mullana (father)
- Education: University of Delhi, (LLB, 2006)
- Profession: Lawyer

Varun Chaudhary (born 23 March 1980) is an Indian politician and a Member of Parliament of the 18th Lok Sabha representing Ambala. He was a member of 14th Haryana Legislative Assembly representing Mulana. He is a member of the Indian National Congress.

== Personal life ==
Chaudhary was born on 23 March 1980 to former Indian National Congress chief Phool Chand Mullana and Pushpa Devi in Ambala city of Haryana. He completed Bachelor of Laws from Campus Law Center, University of Delhi in 2006. Singh is a lawyer by profession. He is married to Pooja Chaudhary, with whom he has a son and a daughter.

== Political career ==
=== Member of Haryana Legislative Assembly ===
In the 2019 Haryana Legislative Assembly election, Chaudhary represented Indian National Congress as a candidate from Mulana and went on to defeat Bharatiya Janata Party's Rajbir Singh by 1,688 votes, succeeding Santosh Chauhan Sarwan in the process.

In March 2021, Chaudhary was awarded the 'Best Legislator Award' for his contribution to the Haryana state's assembly.

=== Member of Parliament (Lok Sabha) ===
In the 2024 Lok Sabha election, Chaudhary representing Ambala, defeated Banto Kataria of Bharatiya Janata Party by a margin of 49,036 votes, succeeding incumbent Rattan Lal Kataria. A significant win since it ended BJP's streak in the Ambala seat, which had been held by the party since 1999. After which, he had to vacate the Mulana Assembly seat, that incidentally was won by his wife Pooja in the 2024 Haryana Legislative Assembly election.
