= Ambala City Assembly constituency =

Constituency of the Haryana legislative assembly in India

Coordinates: 30.37°N 76.77°E

- Constituency No. 5 for the Haryana Legislative Assembly

Constituency details
- Country: India
- Region: North India
- State: Haryana
- District: Ambala
- Lok Sabha constituency: Ambala
- Established: 1967
- Total electors: 2,60,716
- Reservation: None

Member of Legislative Assembly
- 15th Haryana Legislative Assembly
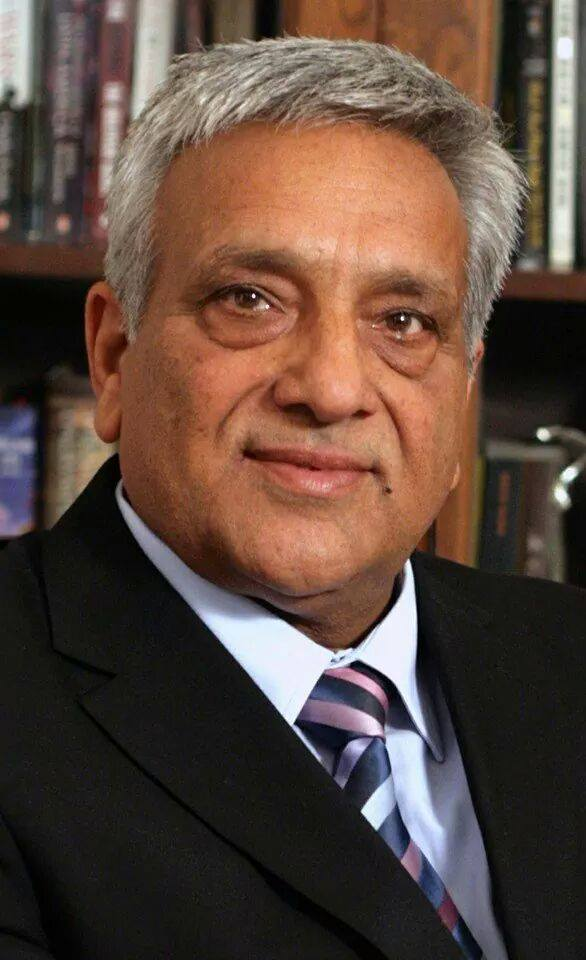
- Incumbent Nirmal Singh
- Party: INC
- Elected year: 2024

Ambala City Assembly constituency is one of the 90 constituencies of Haryana Legislative Assembly. Ambala city is a part of Ambala district.

== Members of the Legislative Assembly ==
Year	Member	Party
1967	Faqir Chand Aggarwal	Bharatiya Jana Sangh
1968	Lekh Wati Jain	Indian National Congress
1972	Lekh Wati Jain	Indian National Congress
1977	Shiv Prasad	Janata Party
1982	Shiv Prasad	Bharatiya Janata Party
1987	Shiv Prasad	Bharatiya Janata Party
1991	Sumer Chand	Indian National Congress
1996	Faqir Chand Aggarwal	Bharatiya Janata Party
2000	Veena Chhibber	Bharatiya Janata Party
2005	Venod Sharma	Indian National Congress
2009	Venod Sharma	Indian National Congress
2014	Aseem Goel	Bharatiya Janata Party
2019	Aseem Goel	Bharatiya Janata Party
2024	Nirmal Singh	Indian National Congress

== Election results ==
=== Assembly Election 2024 ===
2024 Haryana Legislative Assembly election: Ambala City
Party	Candidate	Votes	%	±%
INC	Nirmal Singh	84,475	50.98%	▲37.91
BJP	Aseem Goel	73,344	44.26%	▲2.06
ASP(KR)	Parul Nagpal Udaipuria	2,423	1.46%	New
AAP	Ketan Sharma	1,492	0.90%	▲0.34
BSP	Malkit Singh Bhanokheri	1,305	0.79%	▼1.09
NOTA	None of the Above	1,371	0.83%	▼0.14
Margin of victory		11,131	6.72%	▲0.90
Turnout		1,65,701	63.20%	▲2.70
Registered electors		2,60,716		▲3.16
INC gain from BJP		Swing	▲8.78	

=== Assembly Election 2019 ===
2019 Haryana Legislative Assembly election: Ambala City
Party	Candidate	Votes	%	±%
BJP	Aseem Goel	64,896	42.20%	4.91%
Independent	Nirmal Singh	55,944	36.38%	
INC	Jasbir Mallour	20,091	13.07%	−8.40%
JJP	Harpal Singh Kamboj	5,711	3.71%	
BSP	Ravinder Singh	2,890	1.88%	0.58%
NOTA	Nota	1,484	0.97%	0.28%
AAP	Anshul Kumar Aggarwal	868	0.56%	
Margin of victory		8,952	5.82%	−8.58%
Turnout		1,53,772	60.50%	−10.15%
Registered electors		2,54,168		11.20%
BJP hold		Swing	4.91%	

=== Assembly Election 2014 ===
2014 Haryana Legislative Assembly election: Ambala City
Party	Candidate	Votes	%	±%
BJP	Aseem Goel	60,216	37.29%	27.60%
HJCPV	Venod Sharma	36,964	22.89%	
INC	Himmat Singh	34,658	21.46%	−31.31%
SAD	Balvinder Singh	22,783	14.11%	−11.65%
BSP	Pritpal Singh	2,093	1.30%	−6.85%
NOTA	None of the Above	1,101	0.68%	
Margin of victory		23,252	14.40%	−12.62%
Turnout		1,61,486	70.65%	0.60%
Registered electors		2,28,573		21.70%
BJP gain from INC		Swing	-15.49%	

=== Assembly Election 2009 ===
2009 Haryana Legislative Assembly election: Ambala City
Party	Candidate	Votes	%	±%
INC	Venod Sharma	69,435	52.77%	−11.74%
SAD	Bibi Charanjeet Kaur Mallour	33,885	25.75%	
BJP	Dr. Sanjay Sharma	12,741	9.68%	−2.28%
BSP	Makhan Singh	10,719	8.15%	6.81%
HJC(BL)	Puran Parkash	2,736	2.08%	
Independent	Mehar Chand Nagra	691	0.53%	
Margin of victory		35,550	27.02%	−17.99%
Turnout		1,31,571	70.05%	8.09%
Registered electors		1,87,813		48.33%
INC hold		Swing	-11.74%	

=== Assembly Election 2005 ===
2005 Haryana Legislative Assembly election: Ambala City
Party	Candidate	Votes	%	±%
INC	Venod Sharma	50,618	64.52%	30.41%
INLD	Surjit Singh	15,302	19.50%	
BJP	Veena Chhibber	9,387	11.96%	−30.88%
BSP	Hakam Singh	1,048	1.34%	−0.93%
Independent	Harmesh Singh	898	1.14%	
Independent	Kala Ram Chauhan	641	0.82%	
Margin of victory		35,316	45.01%	36.27%
Turnout		78,457	61.97%	1.38%
Registered electors		1,26,615		9.72%
INC gain from BJP		Swing	21.67%	

=== Assembly Election 2000 ===
2000 Haryana Legislative Assembly election: Ambala City
Party	Candidate	Votes	%	±%
BJP	Veena Chhibber	29,949	42.84%	4.67%
INC	Kiran Bala	23,840	34.11%	0.83%
Independent	Nirmal Vij	10,762	15.40%	
Independent	Pritam Singh	3,196	4.57%	
BSP	Shanti Dass	1,586	2.27%	−5.51%
HVP	Surjit Singh	568	0.81%	
Margin of victory		6,109	8.74%	3.84%
Turnout		69,901	60.58%	−6.15%
Registered electors		1,15,397		0.53%
BJP hold		Swing	9.93%	

=== Assembly Election 1996 ===
1996 Haryana Legislative Assembly election: Ambala City
Party	Candidate	Votes	%	±%
BJP	Faqir Chand Aggarwal	28,570	38.18%	7.03%
INC	Sumer Chand	24,900	33.27%	0.35%
SAP	Rameshwar Parshad	8,511	11.37%	
BSP	Puran Parkash Saini	5,822	7.78%	2.10%
Independent	Sukhdev Singh Govind Garh	2,996	4.00%	
AIIC(T)	Raj Kumar	2,107	2.82%	
Independent	Nirmala Sandhu	448	0.60%	
BSP(A)	Som Nath Boh	425	0.57%	
Margin of victory		3,670	4.90%	3.14%
Turnout		74,834	66.74%	−1.43%
Registered electors		1,14,794		22.54%
BJP gain from INC		Swing	5.26%	

=== Assembly Election 1991 ===
1991 Haryana Legislative Assembly election: Ambala City
Party	Candidate	Votes	%	±%
INC	Sumer Chand	20,489	32.92%	−2.84%
BJP	Faqir Chand Aggarwal	19,388	31.15%	−14.52%
All India Youth Akali Dal	Sukhdev Singh	10,244	16.46%	
JP	Gian Chand	4,123	6.62%	3.79%
BSP	Arjun Dass Liharsa	3,537	5.68%	
HVP	Surjit Rai Wadhawan	1,324	2.13%	
Independent	Shiv Kumar	1,006	1.62%	
Independent	Ajay Kumar	768	1.23%	
Independent	Surinder Sood	680	1.09%	
Margin of victory		1,101	1.77%	−8.14%
Turnout		62,241	68.17%	−1.53%
Registered electors		93,681		17.75%
INC gain from BJP		Swing	-12.75%	

=== Assembly Election 1987 ===
1987 Haryana Legislative Assembly election: Ambala City
Party	Candidate	Votes	%	±%
BJP	Shiv Prasad	25,073	45.67%	−1.70%
INC	Ram Yash	19,632	35.76%	−4.67%
Independent	Ajit Singh	3,181	5.79%	
JP	Amarjit Singh	1,556	2.83%	−0.89%
Independent	Jaswant Rai	976	1.78%	
Independent	Munshi Ram	969	1.77%	
Independent	Raj Sukhnandan	807	1.47%	
VHP	Harish Kumar	497	0.91%	
Independent	Sita Ram	446	0.81%	
Margin of victory		5,441	9.91%	2.97%
Turnout		54,896	69.70%	0.20%
Registered electors		79,557		18.21%
BJP hold		Swing	-1.70%	

=== Assembly Election 1982 ===
1982 Haryana Legislative Assembly election: Ambala City
Party	Candidate	Votes	%	±%
BJP	Shiv Prasad	21,847	47.38%	
INC	Sumer Chand	18,646	40.43%	18.15%
Independent	Munshi Ram	3,176	6.89%	
JP	Darshan Lal	1,719	3.73%	−72.27%
Independent	Rajinder Verma	614	1.33%	
Margin of victory		3,201	6.94%	−46.77%
Turnout		46,115	69.50%	5.97%
Registered electors		67,302		13.85%
BJP gain from JP		Swing	-28.62%	

=== Assembly Election 1977 ===
1977 Haryana Legislative Assembly election: Ambala City
Party	Candidate	Votes	%	±%
JP	Shiv Prasad	28,237	75.99%	
INC	Lekh Wati Jain	8,279	22.28%	−28.39%
Independent	Hari Chand	641	1.73%	
Margin of victory		19,958	53.71%	51.43%
Turnout		37,157	63.53%	−5.86%
Registered electors		59,115		20.34%
JP gain from INC		Swing	25.33%	

=== Assembly Election 1972 ===
1972 Haryana Legislative Assembly election: Ambala City
Party	Candidate	Votes	%	±%
INC	Lekh Wati Jain	16,932	50.67%	▼4.91
ABJS	Laxmi Narain	16,170	48.39%	▲12.17
Independent	Raja Ram	316	0.95%	New
Margin of victory		762	2.28%	▼17.08
Turnout		33,418	69.39%	▲13.99
Registered electors		49,123		▲1.39
INC hold		Swing		

=== Assembly Election 1968 ===
1968 Haryana Legislative Assembly election: Ambala City
Party	Candidate	Votes	%	±%
INC	Lekh Wati Jain	14,552	55.58%	▲27.06
ABJS	Faqir Chand Aggarwal	9,482	36.22%	▼14.28
BKD	Raghubir Saran	1,546	5.90%	New
Independent	Roshan Lal	233	0.89%	New
RPI	Gian Chand	176	0.67%	New
Independent	Sardara Singh Mitha	66	0.25%	New
Independent	Mangal Singh Marwah	65	0.25%	New
Independent	Darshan Singh	62	0.24%	New
Margin of victory		5,070	19.36%	▼2.61
Turnout		26,182	55.00%	▼15.68
Registered electors		48,449		▲7.37
INC gain from ABJS		Swing	▲5.08	

=== Assembly Election 1967 ===
1967 Haryana Legislative Assembly election: Ambala City
Party	Candidate	Votes	%	±%
ABJS	Faqir Chand Aggarwal	15,887	50.50%	New
INC	A. G. Khan	8,973	28.52%	New
Independent	J. Singh	6,149	19.54%	New
Independent	J. Singh	452	1.44%	New
Margin of victory		6,914	21.98%	
Turnout		31,461	71.74%	
Registered electors		45,123		
ABJS win (new seat)				
