= Mulana Assembly constituency =

Constituency of Haryana legislature in India

Coordinates: 30.15°N 77.02°E

Mulana
- Constituency No. 6 for the Haryana Legislative Assembly

Constituency details
- Country: India
- Region: North India
- State: Haryana
- District: Ambala
- Lok Sabha constituency: Ambala
- Established: 1967
- Total electors: 2,24,831
- Reservation: SC

Member of Legislative Assembly
- 15th Haryana Legislative Assembly
- Incumbent Pooja Chaudhary
- Party: Indian National Congress
- Elected year: 2024

Mulana is one of the 90 assembly seats of Haryana. It is located in Ambala district and is reserved for members of the Scheduled Castes. As of 2025, its representative is Pooja Chaudhary of the Indian National Congress.

== Members of the Legislative Assembly ==
Year	Member	Party
1967	Ram Prasad	Republican Party of India
1968	Ram Parkash	Indian National Congress
1972	Phool Chand Mullana	Indian National Congress
1977	Sher Singh	Janata Party
1982	Phool Chand Mullana	Independent
1987	Suraj Bhan	Bharatiya Janata Party
1991	Phool Chand Mullana	Indian National Congress
1996	Rishal Singh	Samata Party
2000	Rishal Singh	Indian National Lok Dal
2005	Phool Chand Mullana	Indian National Congress
2009	Rajbir Singh	Indian National Lok Dal
2014	Santosh Chauhan Sarwan	Bharatiya Janata Party
2019	Varun Chaudhary	Indian National Congress
2024	Pooja Chaudhary	Indian National Congress

== Election results ==
=== Assembly Election 2024 ===
2024 Haryana Legislative Assembly election : Mulana
Party	Candidate	Votes	%	±%
INC	Pooja Chaudhary	79,089	49.48%	▲5.88
BJP	Santosh Chauhan Sarwan	66,224	41.43%	▼1.07
INLD	Prakash Bharti	8,096	5.07%	▲2.15
JJP	Dr Ravinder Dheen	1,566	0.98%	▼2.14
Independent	Dalip Singh	1,193	0.75%	New
AAP	Gurtej Singh	1,071	0.67%	New
NOTA	None of the Above	480	0.30%	New
Margin of victory		12,865	8.05%	▲6.95
Turnout		1,59,837	71.32%	▼0.58
Registered electors		2,24,831		▲4.78
INC hold		Swing	▲5.88	

=== Assembly Election 2019 ===
2019 Haryana Legislative Assembly election : Mulana
Party	Candidate	Votes	%	±%
INC	Varun Chaudhary	67,051	43.60%	▲15.34
BJP	Rajbir Singh	65,363	42.50%	▲10.35
BSP	Krishan Dass	10,451	6.80%	▼1.44
JJP	Amar Nath	4,790	3.11%	New
INLD	Daya Rani	4,479	2.91%	▼25.61
Margin of victory		1,688	1.10%	▼2.54
Turnout		1,53,783	71.90%	▼7.49
Registered electors		2,13,888		▲9.26
INC gain from BJP		Swing	▲11.45	

=== Assembly Election 2014 ===
2014 Haryana Legislative Assembly election : Mulana
Party	Candidate	Votes	%	±%
BJP	Santosh Chauhan Sarwan	49,970	32.15%	▲28.34
INLD	Rajbir Singh	44,321	28.52%	▼7.85
INC	Varun Chaudhary	43,915	28.26%	▼5.85
BSP	Karnail Singh	12,797	8.23%	▼13.43
HJC(BL)	Raj Kumar	2,038	1.31%	▼0.36
Margin of victory		5,649	3.63%	▲1.37
Turnout		1,55,408	79.39%	▲1.94
Registered electors		1,95,756		▲16.86
BJP gain from INLD		Swing	▼4.21	

=== Assembly Election 2009 ===
2009 Haryana Legislative Assembly election : Mulana
Party	Candidate	Votes	%	±%
INLD	Rajbir Singh	47,185	36.37%	▼0.15
INC	Phool Chand Mullana	44,248	34.11%	▼11.44
BSP	Parkash Ram Bharti	28,113	21.67%	▲12.13
BJP	Mange Ram Panjail	4,954	3.82%	▼1.00
HJC(BL)	Amar Nath	2,173	1.67%	New
Independent	Dharam Pal Bihana	748	0.58%	New
Independent	Gian Chand	734	0.57%	New
Margin of victory		2,937	2.26%	▼6.76
Turnout		1,29,740	77.45%	▲1.97
Registered electors		1,67,513		▲25.01
INLD gain from INC		Swing	▼9.17	

=== Assembly Election 2005 ===
2005 Haryana Legislative Assembly election : Mulana
Party	Candidate	Votes	%	±%
INC	Phool Chand Mullana	46,067	45.54%	▲4.42
INLD	Risal Singh	36,937	36.52%	▼10.53
BSP	Jarnail Singh	9,653	9.54%	▼0.98
BJP	Arun Kumar	4,878	4.82%	New
BRP	Joti Ram	1,300	1.29%	New
LKD	Rajesh	822	0.81%	New
Independent	Sushil Kumar	790	0.78%	New
Independent	Sanjeev Gharu	633	0.63%	New
Margin of victory		9,130	9.03%	▲3.10
Turnout		1,01,151	75.49%	▲4.41
Registered electors		1,34,001		▲10.14
INC gain from INLD		Swing	▼1.50	

=== Assembly Election 2000 ===
2000 Haryana Legislative Assembly election : Mulana
Party	Candidate	Votes	%	±%
INLD	Risal Singh	40,682	47.05%	New
INC	Phool Chand Mullana	35,560	41.12%	▲16.61
BSP	Kusum Sherwal	9,101	10.52%	▼10.19
Margin of victory		5,122	5.92%	▲3.98
Turnout		86,473	71.59%	▲0.08
Registered electors		1,21,663		▲1.16
INLD gain from SAP		Swing		

=== Assembly Election 1996 ===
1996 Haryana Legislative Assembly election : Mulana
Party	Candidate	Votes	%	±%
SAP	Risal Singh	22,592	26.46%	New
INC	Phool Chand	20,930	24.51%	▼10.61
BJP	Mange Ram	19,865	23.26%	▲13.98
BSP	Ashok Kumar S/O Ram Nath	17,691	20.72%	▲3.64
Independent	Jitender Kumar	1,585	1.86%	New
AIIC(T)	Satpal	787	0.92%	New
BSP(A)	Gurdev Singh	679	0.80%	New
IC(S)	Jaspal	475	0.56%	New
Independent	Krishan Chand	435	0.51%	New
Margin of victory		1,662	1.95%	▼13.75
Turnout		85,394	73.79%	▲3.66
Registered electors		1,20,273		▲18.71
SAP gain from INC		Swing	▼8.66	

=== Assembly Election 1991 ===
1991 Haryana Legislative Assembly election : Mulana
Party	Candidate	Votes	%	±%
INC	Phool Chand Mullana	23,961	35.12%	▼3.34
HVP	Faqir Chand	13,254	19.43%	New
BSP	Jarnail Singh	11,654	17.08%	New
JP	Phool Chand Dhanaura	9,298	13.63%	New
BJP	Shana Ram	6,333	9.28%	▼39.01
Independent	Biru Ram	993	1.46%	New
Independent	Kanwar Paul	621	0.91%	New
Independent	Khem Chand	474	0.69%	New
Independent	Sant Ram	473	0.69%	New
Doordarshi Party	Nar Singh	407	0.60%	New
Margin of victory		10,707	15.69%	▲5.86
Turnout		68,227	70.21%	▼5.40
Registered electors		1,01,314		▲12.47
INC gain from BJP		Swing	▼13.17	

=== Assembly Election 1987 ===
1987 Haryana Legislative Assembly election : Mulana
Party	Candidate	Votes	%	±%
BJP	Suraj Bhan	31,644	48.29%	New
INC	Phul Chand	25,202	38.46%	▲5.58
Independent	Fakir Chand	4,323	6.60%	New
Independent	Ram Parsad	1,156	1.76%	New
Independent	Risal Singh	943	1.44%	New
Independent	Bachna Ram	549	0.84%	New
Independent	Samer Chand Yatri	424	0.65%	New
Independent	Naseeb Singh	382	0.58%	New
Independent	Bishna Ram	372	0.57%	New
Margin of victory		6,442	9.83%	▼15.79
Turnout		65,527	74.11%	▼1.03
Registered electors		90,083		▲18.79
BJP gain from Independent		Swing	▼10.21	

=== Assembly Election 1982 ===
1982 Haryana Legislative Assembly election : Mulana
Party	Candidate	Votes	%	±%
Independent	Phool Chand	32,727	58.50%	New
INC	Sher Singh	18,394	32.88%	▼6.45
LKD	Nar Singh	2,046	3.66%	New
JP	Balwant Singh	644	1.15%	▼52.21
Independent	Nand Ram	569	1.02%	New
Independent	Sant Ram	525	0.94%	New
Independent	Dharam Pal	443	0.79%	New
Margin of victory		14,333	25.62%	▲11.59
Turnout		55,940	75.21%	▲7.02
Registered electors		75,834		▲20.84
Independent gain from JP		Swing	▲5.14	

=== Assembly Election 1977 ===
1977 Haryana Legislative Assembly election : Mulana
Party	Candidate	Votes	%	±%
JP	Sher Singh	22,351	53.36%	New
INC	Phool Chand	16,472	39.33%	▼25.60
Independent	Ram Parsad	1,278	3.05%	New
Independent	Hirda Ram	628	1.50%	New
Independent	Sunder Lal	503	1.20%	New
RPI	Dharam Pal	384	0.92%	New
VHP	Sheo Ram	268	0.64%	New
Margin of victory		5,879	14.04%	▼15.81
Turnout		41,884	67.65%	▲6.24
Registered electors		62,754		▲2.12
JP gain from INC		Swing	▼11.56	

=== Assembly Election 1972 ===
1972 Haryana Legislative Assembly election : Mulana
Party	Candidate	Votes	%	±%
INC	Phool Chand	24,140	64.93%	▲3.94
ABJS	Suraj Bhan	13,041	35.07%	▲32.94
Margin of victory		11,099	29.85%	▲5.75
Turnout		37,181	63.18%	▲9.69
Registered electors		61,451		▲13.14
INC hold		Swing		

=== Assembly Election 1968 ===
1968 Haryana Legislative Assembly election : Mulana
Party	Candidate	Votes	%	±%
INC	Ram Parkash	16,830	60.98%	▲22.21
RPI	Ram Parshad	10,179	36.88%	▼15.65
ABJS	Atma Ram	589	2.13%	New
Margin of victory		6,651	24.10%	▲10.34
Turnout		27,598	52.51%	▼10.04
Registered electors		54,313		▲4.01
INC gain from RPI		Swing		

=== Assembly Election 1967 ===
1967 Haryana Legislative Assembly election : Mulana
Party	Candidate	Votes	%	±%
RPI	R. Prasad	16,694	52.53%	New
INC	S. Ram	12,321	38.77%	New
SWA	D. Paul	1,721	5.42%	New
Independent	A. Ram	1,041	3.28%	New
Margin of victory		4,373	13.76%	
Turnout		31,777	64.84%	
Registered electors		52,219		
RPI win (new seat)				

== See also ==
- Ambala district
- List of constituencies of the Haryana Legislative Assembly
- [votercomposition]

SC-42000 BRAHMIN-18000 PUNJABI-17670 JAAT-8678 SAINI-7734 RAJPUT KSHTARIYA-37450 GUJJAR-4000 BANIYA-12000 OTHERS-66000
