= Ram Prakash Chaudhary =

Ram Prakash Chaudhary may refer to:

- Ram Prakash Chaudhary (Indian politician)
- Ram Prakash Chaudhary (Nepalese politician)
