= Nirmal Singh (Haryana politician) =

Indian politician

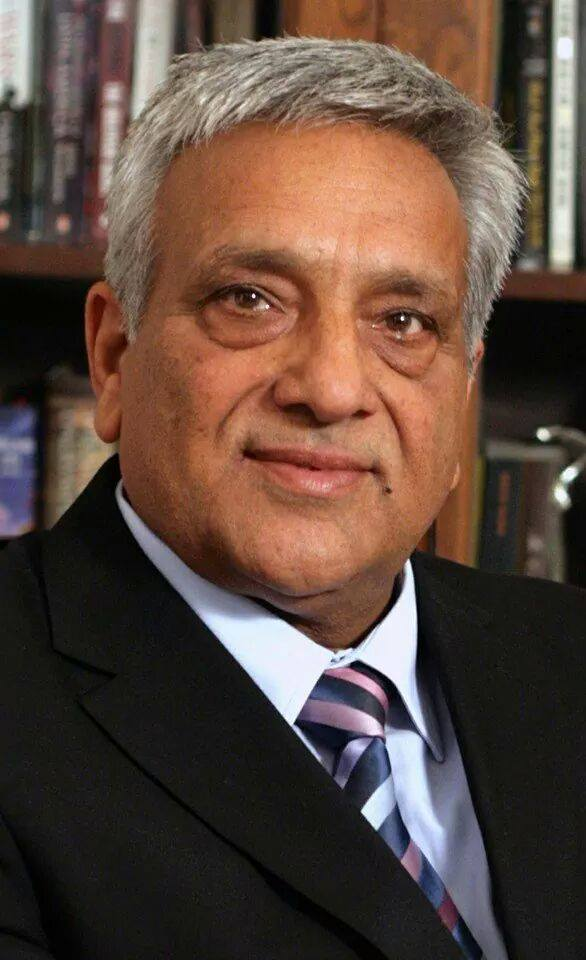
- Nirmal Singh in 2014.

Member of the Haryana Legislative Assembly
- Incumbent
- Assumed office 8 October 2024
- Preceded by: Aseem Goel
- Constituency: Ambala City

Personal details
- Born: 3 February 1953 (age 73) Ambala, Punjab, India (now in Haryana, India)
- Party: Indian National Congress (2024-present) (1974-1996) (1999-2019)
- Other political affiliations: Aam Aadmi Party (2022-2024); Haryana Democratic Front (2019-2022)
- Spouse: Naib Kaur
- Children: 4, including Chitra Sarwara
- Occupation: Politician

Nirmal Singh Mohra is an Indian politician from Haryana. He is a member of the Indian National Congress. He is a five time member of the Haryana Legislative Assembly.

== Background and early life ==
Singh was born in Mohra village. His father adopted Arya Samaj in Sonipat and worked as a teacher and was renowned as Master Hazara Singh. He married Naib Kaur and has two daughters and two sons.

== Political career ==
Singh's political journey started with Sanjay Gandhi in Indian Youth Congress. In 1974, he joined Indian Youth Congress. In 1976, he became the block Youth Congress president and rose to General Secretary of Pradesh Youth Congress, Haryana in 1980. He served as President, State Youth Congress, Haryana for seven years from August 1982 to 1989 and also served as the vice-president of Haryana Pradesh Congress Committee.

He was first elected as Member of the Legislative Assembly winning the 1982 Haryana Legislative Assembly election representing the Indian National Congress party. He won again in 1991 and 1996, and regained it in 2005 to become a four-time MLA from Naggal Assembly constituency.

He organised two mega-rallies at Kurukshetra grounds, Haryana. The Hisaab Lagao Rally was taken on 25 June 2002. The second Hisaab Chukao Rally was held on 9 December 2004.

He re-joined Congress in 1999 and contested again from the same seat in 2000 and 2005 on Congress ticket. He lost to Jasbir Mallour of INLD in the 2000 Assembly election but regained the seat in 2005.

His old constituency was dissolved under delimitation, and he contested from Ambala Cantt. in the 2009 Haryana Election but lost. He lost again in 2014 Haryana election.

In 2019, he contested from Kurukshetra Lok Sabha constituency as a Congress candidate but lost after polling 3.48 lakh votes. Later in 2019 Haryana Election, he contested as an Independent from Ambala City Assembly constituency after his daughter was denied a party ticket from the adjoining Ambala Cantt. constituency. He lost to the Bhartiya Janta Party candidate Aasem Goel.

In 2024 Haryana Assembly Election Nirmal Singh won the Ambala City seat from BJP candidate Aseem Goel.

=== New party ===
In November 2019, Singh formed his own party Haryana Democratic Front. Under his leadership, the party formed its state, district, ward and village units in various districts of North Haryana within two years. The new party contested the Municipal Corporation election 2020 in Ambala City and won two corporator seats while their Mayor candidate came third.

In April 2022, Singh along with his daughter Chitra Sarwara, National General Secretary and Treasurer of the party, his Son Udayvir Singh Sonu (National General Secretary and Convenor Youth Front) and team members of the party joined Aam Aadmi Party under the leadership of Arvind Kejriwal.

In December 2023, he and his daughter Chitra resigned from AAP and are likely to join the Congress party again in January 2024.

=== Arrest ===
In October 1994, he was implicated in a murder investigation and he voluntarily resigned as a Minister of State for Revenue. He was put behind bars for the next two and half years. He contested the next election in 1996 from behind the bars as an independent candidate and won. Later, he was acquitted of all charges in February 1997.

== Tours ==
- 1983: He was a member of India's first political youth delegation to China after the war.
- 1985: He accompanied late prime minister Rajiv Gandhi to the U.S.A.
