= Aseem Goel =

Indian politician

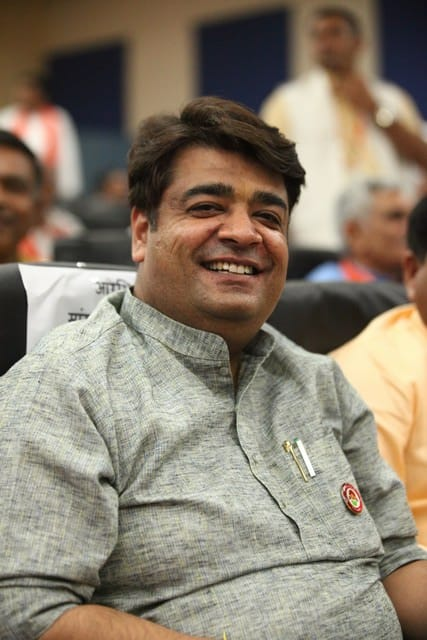
- Aseem Goel present

Member of the Haryana Legislative Assembly
- In office 26 October 2014 – 8 October 2024
- Preceded by: Venod Sharma
- Succeeded by: Nirmal Singh
- Constituency: Ambala City

Personal details
- Born: 25 October 1979 (age 46) Patiala, Punjab, India
- Party: Bhartiya Janta Party
- Education: D.A.V. college, Naneola, Ambala city
- Occupation: Politician
- Profession: businessman
- Website: Official Facebook Page
- As of 12 June, 2014

Aseem Goel is an Indian politician. He was elected to the Haryana Legislative Assembly from Ambala city (Vidhan Sabha constituency) in the 2014 and 2019 Haryana Legislative Assembly election as a member of the Bharatiya Janata Party, and also get ticket from Bharatiya Janata Party for 2024 Haryana legislative Assembly election.

== View of India ==
Goel took an oath to make India a ‘Hindu Rashtra’ and that he is “ready to make or take sacrifice for it” at an event organized by Samajik Chetna Sangathan on Uniform Civil Code at Aggarwal Dharamshala in Ambala city. He justified the move claiming that everyone who lives in India is a Hindu.
