= Ambala Cantonment Assembly constituency =

Ambala Cantt. Assembly constituency
- Constituency No. 4 for the Haryana Legislative Assembly

Constituency details
- Country: India
- Region: North India
- State: Haryana
- District: Ambala
- Lok Sabha constituency: Ambala
- Established: 1967
- Total electors: 2,04,314
- Reservation: None

Member of Legislative Assembly
- 15th Haryana Legislative Assembly
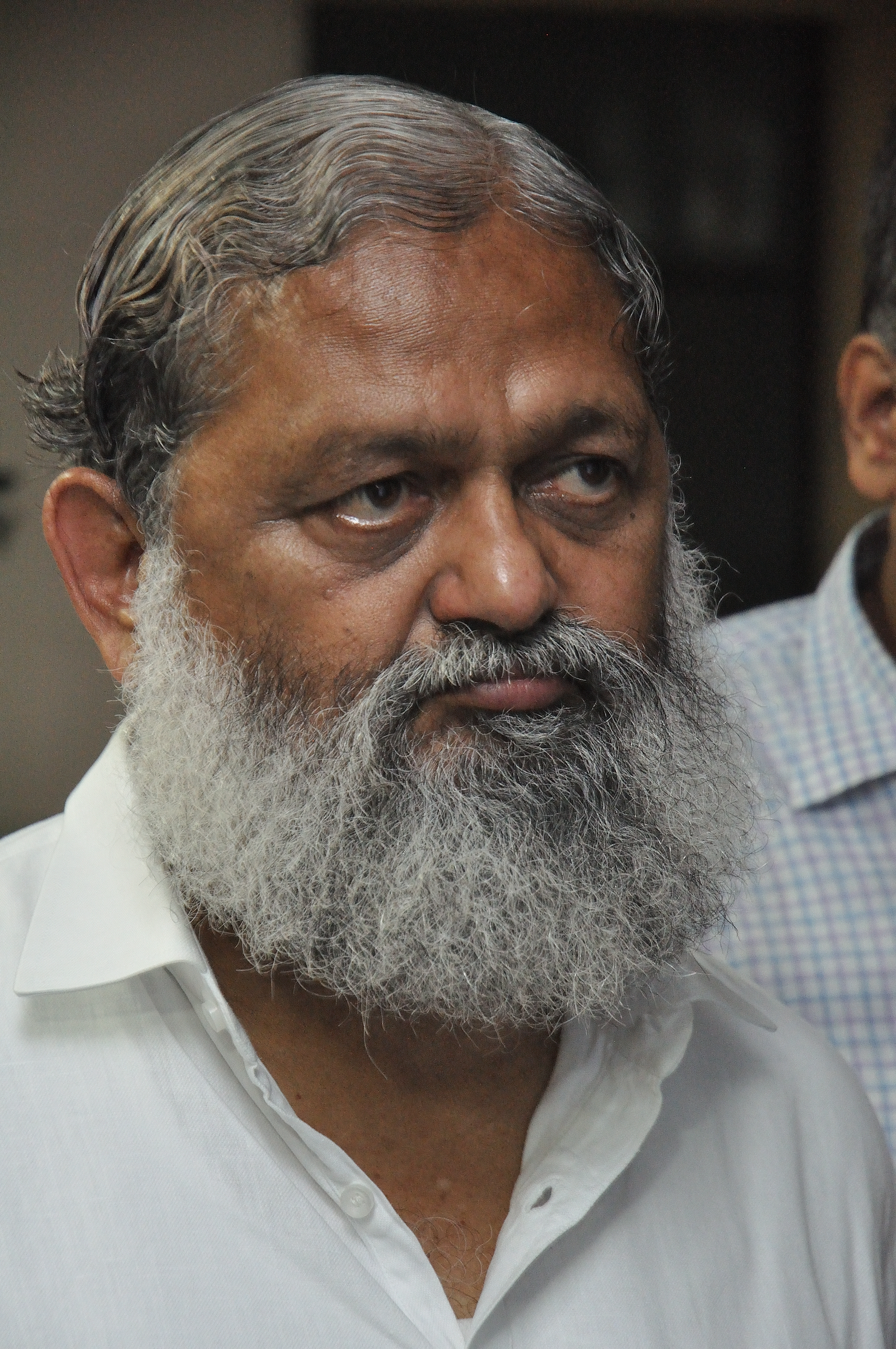
- Incumbent Anil Vij
- Party: BJP
- Elected year: 2024

Ambala Cantonment Assembly constituency is one of the 90 Legislative Assembly constituencies in the state of Haryana. Ambala city is a part of Ambala district. Anil Vij is current MLA.

== Members of Legislative Assembly ==
Year	Member	Party
1967	D. R. Anand	Indian National Congress
1968	Bhagwan Das	Bharatiya Jan Sangh
1972	Hans Raj Suri	Indian National Congress
1977	Sushma Swaraj	Janata Party
1982	Ram Dass Dhamija	Indian National Congress
1987	Sushma Swaraj	Bharatiya Janata Party
1990^	Anil Vij	Bharatiya Janata Party
1991	Brij Anand	Indian National Congress
1996	Anil Vij	Independent
2000	Anil Vij	Independent
2005	Devender Kumar Bansal	Indian National Congress
2009	Anil Vij	Bharatiya Janata Party
2014	Anil Vij	Bharatiya Janata Party
2019	Anil Vij	Bharatiya Janata Party
2024	Anil Vij	Bharatiya Janata Party

== Election results ==
=== Assembly Election 2024 ===
2024 Haryana Legislative Assembly election: Ambala Cantt.
Party	Candidate	Votes	%	±%
BJP	Anil Vij	59,858	44.90	▼8.15
Independent	Chitra Sarwara	52,581	39.44	▲2.96
INC	Parvinder Pal Pari	14,469	10.85	▲3.84
INLD	Onkar Singh	2,863	2.15	New
JJP	Avtar Singh	809	0.61	New
Independent	Dharmesh Sood Rinku	764	0.57	New
NOTA	None of the Above	641	0.48	▼0.35
Margin of victory		7,277	5.46	▼11.11
Turnout		1,33,323	64.63	▲2.80
Registered electors		2,04,314		▲4.78
BJP hold		Swing	▼8.15	

=== Assembly Election 2019 ===
2019 Haryana Legislative Assembly election: Ambala Cantt.
Party	Candidate	Votes	%	±%
BJP	Anil Vij	64,571	53.04	+0.55
Independent	Chitra Sarwara	44,406	36.48	New
INC	Venu Singla	8,534	7.01	−33.30
BSP	Rajesh Kumar	1,938	1.59	0.89
NOTA	None of the above	1,013	0.83	0.04
Margin of victory		20,165	16.56	+4.38
Turnout		1,21,735	61.84	−10.80
Registered electors		1,96,870		+12.69
BJP hold		Swing	+0.55	

=== Assembly Election 2014 ===
2014 Haryana Legislative Assembly election: Ambala Cantt.
Party	Candidate	Votes	%	±%
BJP	Anil Vij	66,605	52.49	+3.28
INC	Ch. Nirmal Singh	51,143	40.31	−2.57
INLD	Suraj Parkash Jindal	5,407	4.26	+2.07
NOTA	None of the above	1,007	0.79	New
BSP	Charan Singh	885	0.70	−2.37
Margin of victory		15,462	12.19	+5.85
Turnout		1,26,888	72.63	+4.79
Registered electors		1,74,704		+18.50
BJP hold		Swing	+3.28	

=== Assembly Election 2009 ===
2009 Haryana Legislative Assembly election: Ambala Cantt.
Party	Candidate	Votes	%	±%
BJP	Anil Vij	49,219	49.21	+33.52
INC	Nirmal Singh	42,881	42.87	+12.50
BSP	Parveen Chauhan	3,065	3.06	+2.07
INLD	Dr. K. D. Sharma	2,189	2.19	New
Margin of victory		6,338	6.34	+5.28
Turnout		1,00,018	67.84	−0.71
Registered electors		1,47,434		+73.18
BJP gain from INC		Swing	+18.84	

=== Assembly Election 2005 ===
2005 Haryana Legislative Assembly election: Ambala Cantt.
Party	Candidate	Votes	%	±%
INC	Devender Kumar Bansal	17,723	30.37	7.71
Independent	Anil Vij	17,108	29.32	
Independent	Hira Lal	13,369	22.91	
BJP	Ravi Sehgal	9,155	15.69	−13.40
BSP	Maya Ram	583	1.00	
Margin of victory		615	1.05	−15.42
Turnout		58,359	68.55	5.43
Registered electors		85,131		−2.97
INC gain from Independent		Swing	-15.20	

=== Assembly Election 2000 ===
2000 Haryana Legislative Assembly election: Ambala Cantt.
Party	Candidate	Votes	%	±%
Independent	Anil Vij	25,045	45.57	
BJP	Kabir Dev	15,988	29.09	6.91
INC	Sudershan Dua	12,452	22.66	−6.70
NCP	Shiv Om	666	1.21	
Independent	Pardeep Chauhan	323	0.59	
Margin of victory		9,057	16.48	5.74
Turnout		54,963	63.13	−4.04
Registered electors		87,741		1.14
Independent hold		Swing	-9.28	

=== Assembly Election 1996 ===
1996 Haryana Legislative Assembly election: Ambala Cantt.
Party	Candidate	Votes	%	±%
Independent	Anil Vij	22,735	40.10	
INC	Raj Rani	16,645	29.36	−25.49
BJP	Kabir Dev	12,573	22.17	−16.61
AIIC(T)	Shiv Kumar	1,700	3.00	
BSP	Sewa Singh	1,414	2.49	0.82
CPI	Pushpa	454	0.80	
Margin of victory		6,090	10.74	−5.32
Turnout		56,700	67.17	1.93
Registered electors		86,756		11.72
Independent gain from INC		Swing	-14.75	

=== Assembly Election 1991 ===
1991 Haryana Legislative Assembly election: Ambala Cantt.
Party	Candidate	Votes	%	±%
INC	Brij Anand	27,377	54.85	23.50
BJP	Anil Kumar	19,360	38.79	−9.80
JP	Satish	1,447	2.90	
BSP	Mohinder Bir Singh	834	1.67	
JD	Sudesh	350	0.70	
Margin of victory		8,017	16.06	−1.18
Turnout		49,912	65.24	−5.94
Registered electors		77,658		18.25
INC gain from BJP		Swing	6.26	

=== Assembly Election 1987 ===
1987 Haryana Legislative Assembly election: Ambala Cantt.
Party	Candidate	Votes	%	±%
BJP	Sushma Swaraj	22,473	48.59	28.52
INC	Ram Dass Dhamija	14,501	31.35	−4.56
Independent	Brij Anand	7,574	16.38	
Independent	Vijay Pal	550	1.19	
Independent	Naresh Kumar	483	1.04	
Margin of victory		7,972	17.24	1.73
Turnout		46,248	71.18	−2.63
Registered electors		65,675		19.10
BJP gain from INC		Swing	12.68	

=== Assembly Election 1982 ===
1982 Haryana Legislative Assembly election: Ambala Cantt.
Party	Candidate	Votes	%	±%
INC	Ram Dass Dhamija	14,382	35.92	4.21
JP	Swami Agnivaish	8,171	20.41	−43.04
BJP	Som Prakash	8,036	20.07	
Independent	Bhagwan Dass	7,147	17.85	
Independent	Shiv Prakash	751	1.88	
Independent	Ajmer Singh	373	0.93	
Independent	Ram Lal	331	0.83	
Independent	Om Prakash	246	0.61	
Margin of victory		6,211	15.51	−16.23
Turnout		40,043	73.81	5.99
Registered electors		55,145		19.62
INC gain from JP		Swing	-27.53	

=== Assembly Election 1977 ===
1977 Haryana Legislative Assembly election: Ambala Cantt.
Party	Candidate	Votes	%	±%
JP	Sushma Swaraj	19,639	63.45	New
INC	Dev Raj Anand	9,815	31.71	▼24.87
Independent	Bansi Lal	830	2.68	New
Independent	Narendar Datt	295	0.95	New
Margin of victory		9,824	31.74	▲15.47
Turnout		30,953	67.82	▼2.36
Registered electors		46,099		▲15.56
JP gain from INC		Swing	▲6.87	

=== Assembly Election 1972 ===
1972 Haryana Legislative Assembly election: Ambala Cantt.
Party	Candidate	Votes	%	±%
INC	Hans Raj Suri	15,687	56.57	▲10.52
ABJS	Bhagwan Dass	11,175	40.30	▼11.31
Independent	Virender Kumar Syal	616	2.22	New
Independent	Hari Ram	250	0.90	New
Margin of victory		4,512	16.27	▲10.71
Turnout		27,728	71.00	▲8.46
Registered electors		39,893		▼3.36
INC gain from ABJS		Swing	▲4.96	

=== Assembly Election 1968 ===
1968 Haryana Legislative Assembly election: Ambala Cantt.
Party	Candidate	Votes	%	±%
ABJS	Bhagwan Dass	13,009	51.62	▲11.79
INC	Dev Raj Anand	11,606	46.05	▲4.4
Independent	Karam Vir Singh	258	1.02	New
Independent	Avtar Singh	227	0.90	New
Independent	Sham Lal	103	0.41	New
Margin of victory		1,403	5.57	▲3.74
Turnout		25,203	62.07	▼8.90
Registered electors		41,282		▲6.03
ABJS gain from INC		Swing	▲9.97	

=== Assembly Election 1967 ===
1967 Haryana Legislative Assembly election: Ambala Cantt.
Party	Candidate	Votes	%	±%
INC	Dev Raj Anand	11,343	41.65	New
ABJS	P. Nath	10,845	39.82	New
Independent	R. Nath	3,331	12.23	New
Independent	G. Singh	1,003	3.68	New
Independent	K. Lall	711	2.61	New
Margin of victory		498	1.83	
Turnout		27,233	72.00	
Registered electors		38,934		
INC win (new seat)				
