= Manav Samaj Seva Party =

Political part in India

Manav Samaj Seva Party (Human Society Service Party), is a political party in Haryana, India. MSSP was formed by the ex-president of the Bahujan Samaj Party Haryana state committee and MP, Aman Kumar Nagra, on 12 May 2002.
