= Ambala Sadar =

- city
- Location in Haryana, India Ambala Sadar (India)
- Coordinates: 30.33477°N 76.84335°E
- Country: India
- State: Haryana
- District: Ambala

Population (2001)
  - Total: 106,379

Languages
  - Official: Hindi
- Time zone: UTC+5:30 (IST)
- ISO 3166 code: IN-HR
- Vehicle registration: HR
- Website: haryana.gov.in

Ambala Sadar is a city and a municipal council in Ambala district in the state of Haryana, India.

== Demographics ==
As of 2001 India census, Ambala Sadar had a population of 106,378. Males constitute 52% of the population and females 48%. Ambala Sadar has an average literacy rate of 77%, higher than the national average of 59.5%; with 54% of the males and 46% of females literate. 11% of the population is under 6 years of age.
