= Suraj Bhan =

Indian politician

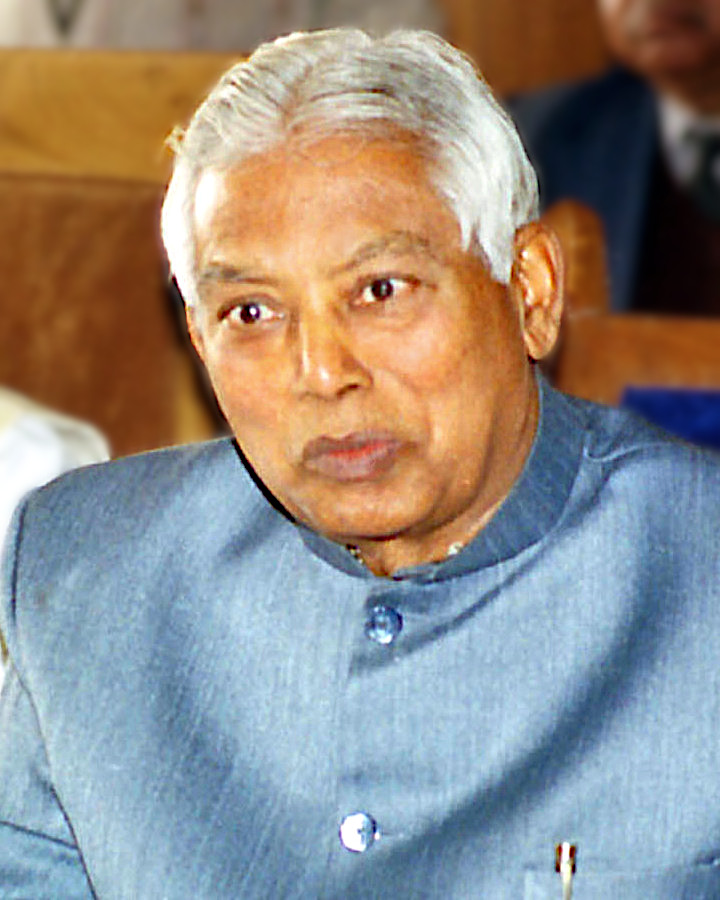
- Suraj Bhan in 2004

Chairman of the National Commission for Scheduled Castes
- In office 2004 - 2006
- Succeeded by: Buta Singh

14th Governor of Himachal Pradesh
- In office 23 November 2000 – 7 May 2003
- Chief Minister: Prem Kumar Dhumal; Virbhadra Singh
- Preceded by: Vishnu Kant Shastri
- Succeeded by: Vishnu Sadashiv Kokje

15th Governor of Uttar Pradesh
- In office 20 April 1998 – 23 November 2000
- Chief Minister: Kalyan Singh; Ram Prakash Gupta; Rajnath Singh
- Preceded by: Mohammad Shafi Qureshi (Acting)
- Succeeded by: Vishnu Kant Shastri

Governor of Bihar (Additional Charge)
- In office 6 October 1999 – 23 November 1999
- Chief Minister: Rabri Devi
- Preceded by: B.M. Lall (Acting)
- Succeeded by: V. C. Pande

11th Deputy Speaker of Lok Sabha
- In office 12 July 1996 – 4 December 1997
- Speaker: P. A. Sangma
- Preceded by: S. Mallikarjunaiah
- Succeeded by: P. M. Sayeed

22nd Minister of Agriculture
- In office 16 May 1996 – 1 June 1996
- Prime Minister: Atal Bihari Vajpayee
- Preceded by: Jagannath Mishra
- Succeeded by: H. D. Deve Gowda

Member of Parliament, Lok Sabha
- In office 1996–1998
- Preceded by: Ram Prakash Chaudhary
- Succeeded by: Aman Kumar Nagra
- Constituency: Ambala
- In office 1977–1984
- Preceded by: Ram Prakash Chaudhary
- Succeeded by: Ram Prakash Chaudhary
- In office 1967–1971
- Preceded by: Chuni Lal
- Succeeded by: Ram Prakash Chaudhary
- Constituency: Ambala

Leader of the Opposition, Haryana Legislative Assembly
- In office 1989-1990
- Succeeded by: Sampat Singh

Revenue Minister (Haryana)
- In office 1987-1989

Personal details
- Born: 1 October 1928 Yamunanagar, British India
- Died: 6 August 2006 (aged 77) Delhi, India
- Cause of death: Cardiac arrest
- Party: Bharatiya Janata Party

Suraj Bhan (1 October 1928 – 6 August 2006) was an Indian politician who was elected to the Lok Sabha, Indian lower house of parliament, for four terms from Ambala. He also served as the Deputy Speaker of Lok Sabha from July 1996 to December 1997. He served as governor of Uttar Pradesh, Himachal Pradesh, and Bihar.

== Personal life ==
Bhan was born on 1 October 1928, in Mehlanwali, Yamuna Nagar district of Haryana in Chamar (Dalit) family and studied MA and LLB at Punjab University and Kurukshetra University.

== Political career ==
Suraj Bhan Banswal, started his public life as a volunteer of the Rashtriya Swayamsevak Sangh. He started his political career with the Bharatiya Jana Sangh which eventually became the Bharatiya Janata Party and dropped his last name "Banswal" after joining active politics. He represented the Ambala parliamentary constituency of Haryana in the 4th (1967–1970), 6th (1977–1979), 7th (1979–1984) and the 11th Lok Sabhas (1996–1997). In 1987, he was elected to Haryana assembly and served as Revenue Minister in Devi Lal's government between 1987 and 1989. After the BJP broke alliance with Devi Lal's party, he served as Leader of Opposition in the Haryana assembly (1989–1990). He was appointed State President of BJP Haryana Unit in 1984.

In 1996, he was named Agriculture minister in the First Vajpayee Ministry after which he served as deputy speaker of the 11th Lok Sabha, during the United Front government (Jul. 1996 to Feb. 1997). He contested 1998 Lok Sabha elections, but lost to Aman Kumar Nagra of the BSP. Afterwards, he took over as Governor of Uttar Pradesh (Apr. 1998 - Nov. 2000), Himachal Pradesh (Nov. 2000 - May 2003), and officiated as Governor of Bihar (1999).

In 2002 Dr Suraj Bhan also joined the race for the post of Vice-President of the country following re-thinking in the BJP over the candidature of former Rajasthan Chief Minister, Bhairon Singh Shekhawat. Certain senior Dalit leaders of the Congress unofficially conveyed that Sonia Gandhi had no objection to Dr Suraj Bhan's candidature.

In February 2004, he was appointed Chairman of Scheduled Castes and Scheduled Tribes (SC/ST) Commission. He died of cardiac arrest following multiple organ failure on 6 August 2006 in New Delhi, while serving as the SC/ST Commission Chairman. He was aged 77.
