= Santosh Chauhan Sarwan =

Indian politician

Santosh Chauhan Sarwan is a member of the Haryana Legislative Assembly from the Bharatiya Janata Party representing the Mulana Vidhan Sabha constituency in Haryana.
