= Ambala Municipal Corporation =

Local civic body in Ambala, Haryana, India

Type
- Type: Municipal Corporation
- Term limits: 5 years

History
- Founded: 2016; 10 years ago

Leadership
- Mayor: Akshita Saini, BJP since May 2026
- Municipal Commissioner: Sachin Gupta, IAS

Structure
- Seats: 20
- Political groups: Government (16): BJP (16); Opposition (4): INC (3); IND (1)
- Length of term: 5 years

Elections
- Voting system: First-past-the-post
- Last election: 2026
- Next election: 2031

Meeting place
- Ambala, Haryana

Website
- mcambala.gov.in/index.aspx

Ambala Municipal Corporation is the municipal corporation governing Indian city of Ambala. Municipal Corporation mechanism in India was introduced during British Rule with formation of municipal corporation in Madras (Chennai) in 1688, later followed by municipal corporations in Bombay (Mumbai) and Calcutta (Kolkata) by 1762. Ambala Municipal Corporation is headed by Mayor of city and governed by Commissioner.

== History and administration ==
Ambala Municipal Corporation was formed in to improve the infrastructure of the town as per the needs of local population. Ambala Corporation has been categorised into wards and each ward is headed by councillor for which elections are held every 5 years.

Ambala Municipal Corporation is governed by mayor Shailja Sachdeva.

== Functions ==
Ambala Municipal Corporation is created for the following functions:

- Planning for the town including its surroundings which are covered under its Department's Urban Planning Authority .
- Approving construction of new buildings and authorising use of land for various purposes.
- Improvement of the town's economic and Social status.
- Arrangements of water supply towards commercial, residential and industrial purposes.
- Planning for fire contingencies through Fire Service Departments.
- Creation of solid waste management, public health system and sanitary services.
- Working for the development of ecological aspect like development of Urban Forestry and making guidelines for environmental protection.
- Working for the development of weaker sections of the society like mentally and physically handicapped, old age and gender biased people.
- Making efforts for improvement of slums and poverty removal in the town.

== Revenue sources ==
The following are the Income sources for the Corporation from the Central and State Government.

=== Revenue from taxes ===
Following is the Tax related revenue for the corporation.

- Property tax.
- Profession tax.
- Entertainment tax.
- Grants from Central and State Government like Goods and Services Tax.
- Advertisement tax.

=== Revenue from non-tax sources ===
Following is the Non Tax related revenue for the corporation.

- Water usage charges.
- Fees from Documentation services.
- Rent received from municipal property.
- Funds from municipal bonds.

== See also ==
- List of municipal corporations in India
