= Pooja Chaudhary =

Indian politician

Member of the Haryana Legislative Assembly
- Incumbent
- Assumed office 8 October 2024
- Preceded by: Varun Chaudhary
- Constituency: Mulana

Personal details
- Political party: Indian National Congress
- Spouse: Varun Chaudhary
- Children: 2
- Profession: Politician

Pooja Chaudhary is an Indian politician from Haryana. She is a Member of the Haryana Legislative Assembly from 2024, representing Mulana as a member of the Indian National Congress.

== Personal life ==
Her husband Varun Chaudhary is a Member of Parliament and represents Ambala in the 18th Lok Sabha. They have a son and a daughter.

== See also ==
- 2024 Haryana Legislative Assembly election
- Haryana Legislative Assembly
