= Faqir Chand Aggarwal =

Indian politician (1932–2024)

Personal details
- Born: April 1932; Ambala, Punjab, British India
- Died: 6 March 2024 (aged 91); Ambala, Haryana, India

Faqir Chand Aggarwal (April 1932 – 6 March 2024), affectionately known as "Headmaster Saab" or "Master Ji," was a distinguished leader, MLA and member of the Bharatiya Janata Party (BJP) in Haryana. He represented Ambala City in the Haryana Legislative Assembly and held the position of Deputy Speaker from 1996 to 2000 during the BJP-HVP alliance government under Bansi Lal.

Before embarking on his political career, Aggarwal was a teacher, a vocation that earned him both the State Award for the Best Teacher in 1974 and the National Award in 1981. Following his retirement in 1994, he transitioned into politics, leveraging his background in education to serve the people of Haryana.

Aggarwal died on 6 March 2024.
