= Ram Prakash Chaudhary (Indian politician) =

Indian politician (1928–1994)

Ram Prakash Chaudhary (7 January 1928 – 19 April 1994) was an Indian politician who was a member of 5th Lok Sabha from Ambala (Lok Sabha constituency) in Haryana State. Chaudhary was also elected to 8th, 9th and 10th Lok Sabha from Ambala. He died in New Delhi on 19 April 1994, at the age of 66.
