= Anil Vij =

Indian politician (born 1953)

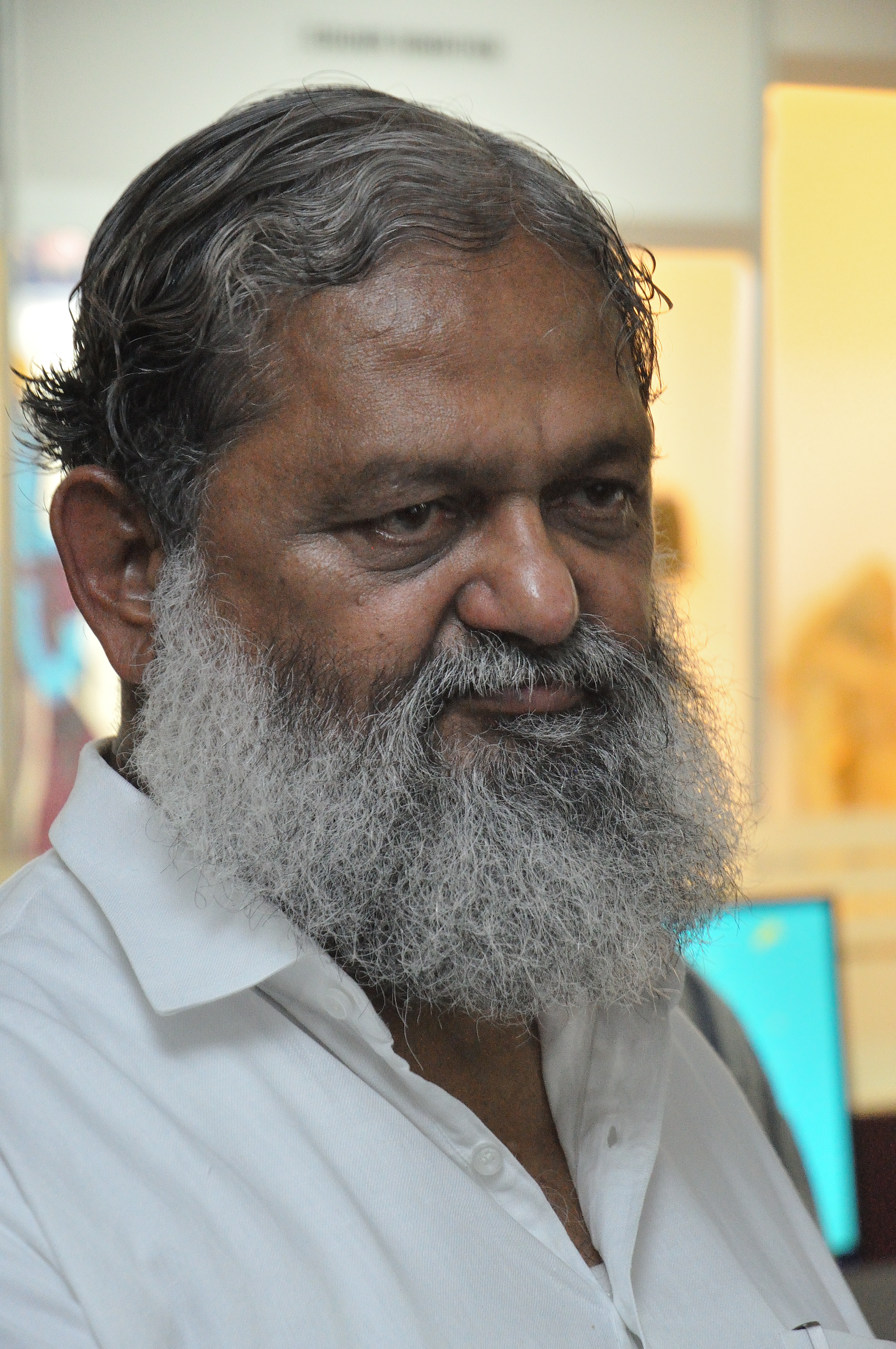
- Vij in 2016

Cabinet Minister, Government of Haryana
- Incumbent
- Assumed office 17 October 2024
- Governor: Bandaru Dattatreya; Ashim Kumar Ghosh
- Chief Minister: Nayab Singh Saini
- Ministry and Departments: Energy; Transport; Labour
- In office 26 October 2014 – 12 March 2024
- Chief Minister: Manohar Lal Khattar
- Ministry: Term
- Minister of Home, Minister of Urban Development, Minister of Technical Education: 14 November 2019 - 12 March 2024
- Minister of Science & Technology: 22 July 2016 - 12 March 2024
- Minister of Health, Minister of Medical Education, Minister of AYUSH: 26 October 2014 - 12 March 2024

Member of Haryana Legislative Assembly
- Incumbent
- Assumed office October 2009
- Preceded by: Devender Kumar Bansal
- Constituency: Ambala Cantonment
- In office 1996–2005
- Preceded by: Brij Anand
- Succeeded by: Devender Kumar Bansal
- Constituency: Ambala Cantonment
- In office 1990–1991
- Preceded by: Sushma Swaraj
- Succeeded by: Brij Anand
- Constituency: Ambala Cantonment

Minister of Sports & Youth Affairs
- In office 26 October 2014 - 27 October 2019

Personal details
- Born: 15 March 1953 (age 73) Ambala, East Punjab, India (now in Haryana, India)
- Party: Bharatiya Janata Party
- Education: Panjab University
- Occupation: Politician
- Website: Official Facebook Page
- As of 27 October, 2019

Anil Vij (born 15 March 1953) is an Indian politician and a member of Haryana Legislative Assembly belonging to the Bharatiya Janata Party serving as the Cabinet Minister in the Government of Haryana.

== Political career ==
Vij joined Akhil Bharatiya Vidyarthi Parishad, a student wing of Rashtriya Swayamsevak Sangh, while he was studying at S. D. College, Ambala Cantt.

In 1970, he became General Secretary of ABVP. Vij worked actively with Vishwa Hindu Parishad, Bharat Vikas Parishad BMS and other such organisations. Vij joined the State Bank of India in 1974.

In 1990, when Sushma Swaraj was elected to Rajya Sabha, the Ambala Cantonment seat became vacant. Vij was asked to resign from service and contest a by-election by the BJP Party.

He contested the election and won. In 1991 he became State President Of Bharatiya Janata Yuva Morcha. In 1996 and 2000, he contested as an independent candidate and won both times.

In 2005, Vij lost re-election. In 2009, he was elected as Bhartiya Janata Party's Member of the Legislative Assembly (India) (MLA) from Ambala Cantonment constituency in the Haryana Legislative Assembly.

In 2014, Vij was again elected as Bharatiya Janata Party's MLA Ambala Cantonment.

In 2019, Vij was again elected for the sixth time as Bharatiya Janata Party's MLA Ambala Cantonment.

On 20 November 2020, Vij becomes the first in his state to volunteer for the anti-COVID vaccine. He was administered a trial dose in a Ambala Cantonment hospital.

In the 2024 Haryana Legislative Assembly election, Vij again won from the Ambala Cantonment seat, by 7,248 votes.

== Cabinet Minister of Haryana ==
On 26 October 2014, Vij was inducted in the Government of Haryana as a Cabinet Minister with the independent charge of the following departments: Department of Home affairs, Haryana Ayush, Health Services, Department of Medical Education, Haryana|Medical Education, Science & Technology, and Sports & Youth Affairs, Haryana.
