= Rattan Lal Kataria =

Indian politician (1951–2023)

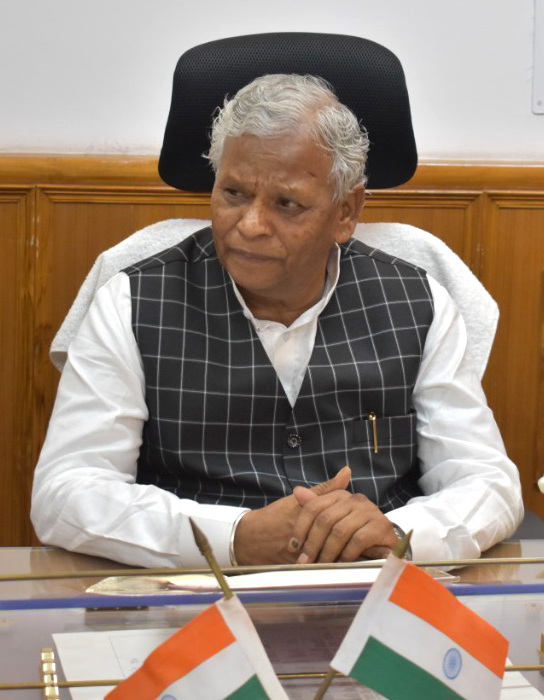
- Kataria in May 2019

Union Minister of State for Jal Shakti
- In office 31 May 2019 – 7 July 2021
- Prime Minister: Narendra Modi
- Minister: Gajendra Singh Shekhawat
- Preceded by: Arjun Ram Meghwal
- Succeeded by: Prahlad Singh Patel

Union Minister of State for Social Justice and Empowerment
- In office 31 May 2019 – 7 July 2021
- Prime Minister: Narendra Modi
- Minister: Thawar Chand Gehlot
- Preceded by: Vijay Sampla
- Succeeded by: A. Narayanaswamy; Pratima Bhoumik; Ramdas Athawale

Member of Parliament, Lok Sabha
- In office 5 June 2014 – 18 May 2023
- Preceded by: Kumari Selja
- Succeeded by: Varun Chaudhary
- Constituency: Ambala, Haryana

Member of Haryana Legislative Assembly
- In office 1987–1991
- Preceded by: Ram Singh
- Succeeded by: Lehri Singh
- Constituency: Radaur

Personal details
- Born: 19 December 1951 Yamunanagar, Punjab, India
- Died: 18 May 2023 (aged 71) Chandigarh, India
- Party: Bharatiya Janata Party
- Spouse: Banto Kataria (m. 1984)
- Children: 3
- Profession: Lawyer
- As of 15 December 2016 Source: Lok Sabha

Rattan Lal Kataria (19 December 1951 – 18 May 2023) was an Indian politician from Haryana. He served as the Minister of State in the Ministry of Jal Shakti and Ministry of Social Justice and Empowerment till 7 July 2021. He was a member of the 16th Lok Sabha. He was elected to 16th Lok Sabha from Ambala as a candidate of the Bharatiya Janata Party with 612,121 votes out of 1,220,121 total, defeating INC candidate Raj Kumar Balmiki. Previously, he was elected to the 13th Lok Sabha from Ambala as a candidate of the Bharatiya Janata Party. He was also a member of the Haryana Legislative Assembly from 1987 to 1991, representing the Radaur Assembly constituency. He was born on 19 December 1951, and educated at Kurukshetra University.

== Career ==
In May 2019, Kataria became Minister of State for Jal Shakti and Social Justice and Empowerment. He served as the president of the Bharatiya Janata Party, Haryana unit from 2000 to 2003 and during his tenure the party started its own magazine Bhajpa Ki Baat in October 2000.

=== Electoral record ===
Haryana Legislative Assembly
Year	Constituency	Party	Result
1982	Radaur	BJP	Lost
1987	Radaur	BJP	Won
1991	Radaur	BJP	Lost

Lok Sabha
Year	Constituency	Party	Result
1999	Ambala	BJP	Won
2004	Ambala	BJP	Lost
2009	Ambala	BJP	Lost
2014	Ambala	BJP	Won
2019	Ambala	BJP	Won

== Personal life and death ==
Kataria was married and had three children. He died from pneumonia at PGI Chandigarh, on 18 May 2023, at the age of 71.

== See also ==
- Chamar
- Jatav
