= 2014 Haryana Legislative Assembly election =

Legislative assembly election in Haryana, India

- 15 October 2014

All 90 seats to the Haryana Legislative Assembly 46 seats needed for a majority
- Turnout: 76.54% (▲4.17%)
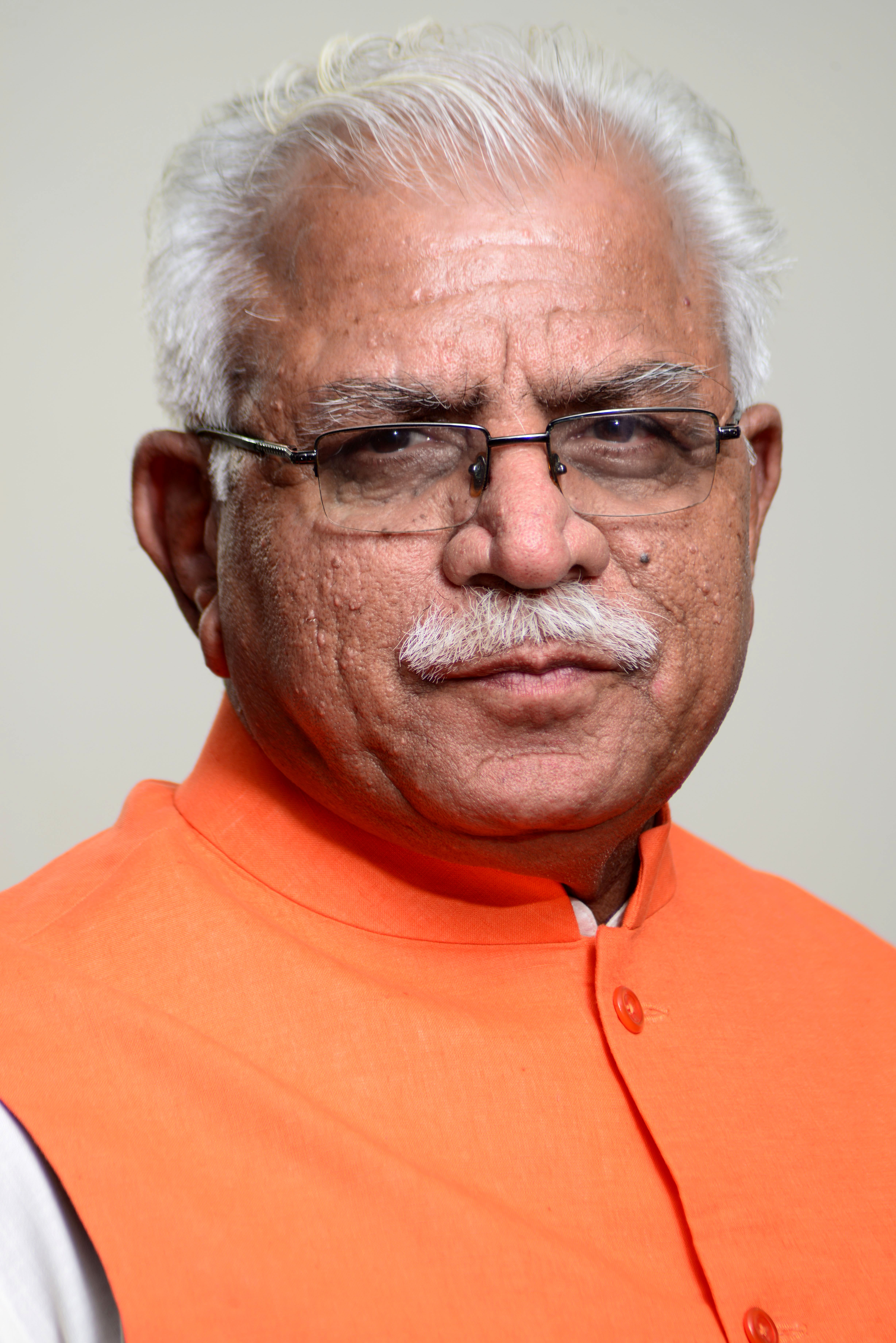

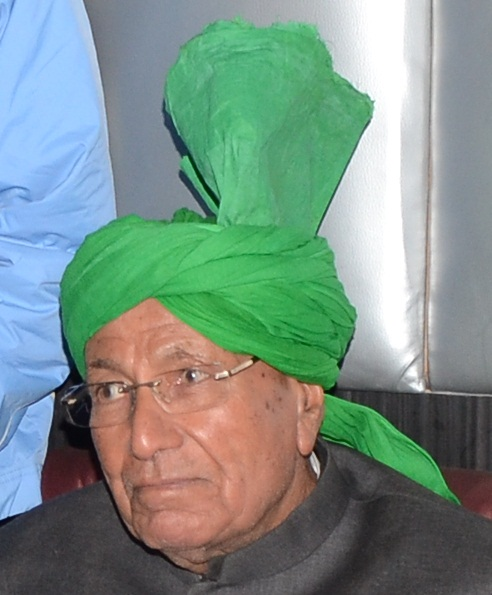

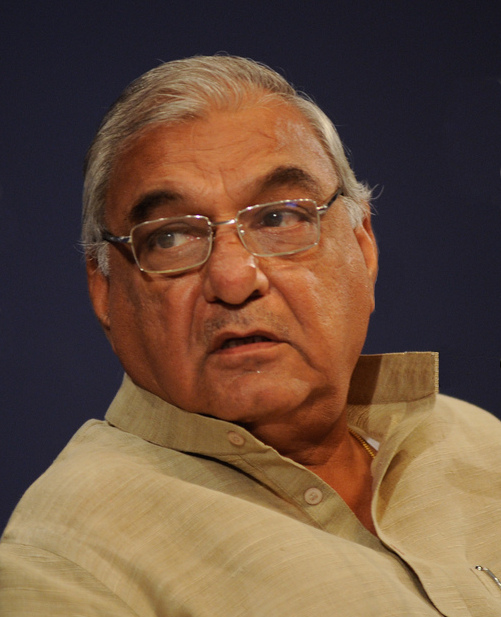

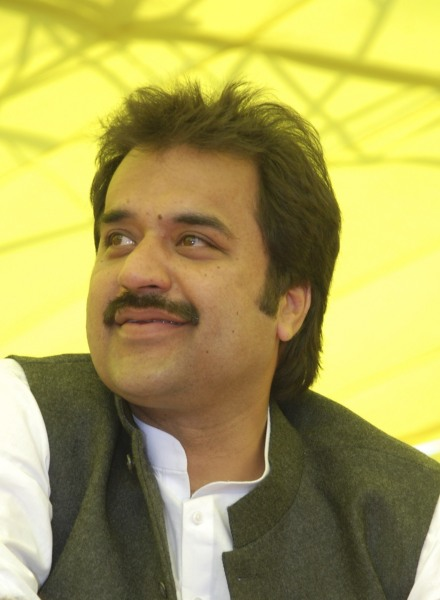

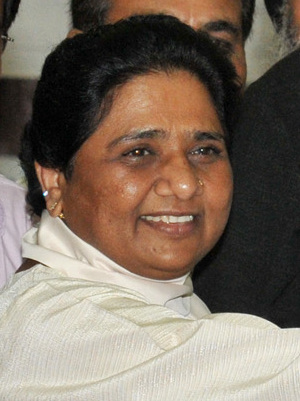
	First party	Second party	Third party
Leader	Manohar Lal Khattar	Om Prakash Chautala	Bhupinder Singh Hooda
Party	BJP	INLD	INC
Alliance	NDA	-	UPA
Last election	4	31	40
Seats won	47	19	15
Seat change	▲43	▼12	▼25
Percentage	33.20%	24.11%	20.58%
Swing	▲24.16%	▼1.68%	▼14.50%
	Fourth party	Fifth party	Sixth party
			SAD
Leader	Kuldeep Bishnoi	Mayawati
Party	HJC (BL)	BSP	SAD
Alliance	-	-	NDA
Last election	6	1	2
Seats won	2	1	1
Seat change	▼4	Steady	Steady
Percentage	3.57%	4.37%	0.62%
Swing	▼3.83%	▼2.36%	▼0.38%
- Seatwise Result Map of the election

- Structure of the Haryana Legislative Assembly after the election
Chief Minister before election
Bhupinder Singh Hooda
INC
Elected Chief Minister
Manohar Lal Khattar
BJP

A general election was held on 15 October 2014 to elect 90 members of the Haryana Legislative Assembly in the Indian state of Haryana. The term of the previous assembly, elected in 2009, was to expire on 27 October 2014. The results were announced on 19 October. The BJP won the majority in the Assembly. Manohar Lal Khattar was chosen to head the new government.

== Parties contending ==
Four major parties contested the election – the Indian National Congress (INC, incumbent), the Indian National Lok Dal (INLD), the Bharatiya Janata Party (BJP) and the Haryana Janhit Congress (HJC). Others that contested the elections included candidates from the Bahujan Samaj Party, Communist Party of India, Communist Party of India (Marxist), Samajwadi Party, Shiromani Akali Dal (an alliance partner of BJP in neighbouring Punjab), other regional parties and independents.

== Parties contested ==
=== National Democratic Alliance ===
No.	Party	Flag	Symbol	Leader	Seats contested
1.	Bharatiya Janata Party			Manohar Lal Khattar	90

=== United Progressive Alliance ===
No.	Party	Flag	Symbol	Leader	Seats contested
1.	Indian National Congress			Bhupinder Singh Hooda	90

=== Indian National Lok Dal ===
No.	Party	Flag	Symbol	Leader	Seats contested
1.	Indian National Lok Dal			Om Prakash Chautala	88

=== Haryana Janhit Congress (BL) ===
No.	Party	Flag	Symbol	Leader	Seats contested
1.	Haryana Janhit Congress (BL)			Kuldeep Bishnoi	65

== Date ==
The Election Commission of India announced, on 12 September 2014, Haryana's Legislative Assembly election under Article 324 and 172(1) of the Constitution of India and Section 15 of Representation of the People Act, 1951. The announcement stated 90 assembly seats to be contested, of which 17 constituencies were reserved for Scheduled Castes candidates.

== Election ==
Voting was held on 15 October and the result was announced four days later. Voter turnout for the Assembly election set a new state record with 76.54%. A total of 1,351 candidates, of which 116 were women, contested for the 90 seats (an average of 15 candidates per seat). This was the highest number of total and women candidates in Haryana assembly elections since its formation in 1966.

Voter-verified paper audit trail (VVPAT) was used along with EVMs in 6 out of 90 assembly constituencies in Haryana-Thanesar, Karnal, Panipat city, Sonipat, Rohtak and Gurgaon.

Among other practices to ensure a fair election, photo electoral rolls and photo identification were mandatory during the election. Each polling booth was provided with multiple Awareness Observers as non-participating members to verify free and fair voting and access. Every polling station was also equipped with basic minimum facilities such as access to drinking water, toilet and a ramp for the disabled. The voters cast their vote at 16,244 polling booths. The poll was conducted using electronic voting machines.

== Exit polls ==
Publish Date	Source	Polling Organisation					
Publish Date	Source	Polling Organisation	Congress	BJP	INLD	HJC	Others
15 October 2014		News 24 – Chanakya	10 (±5)	52 (±7)	23 (±7)	5 (±3)	
15 October 2014		Times Now	15	37	28	6	4
15 October 2014		ABP News – Nielsen	10	46	29	2	3
15 October 2014		India TV – CVoter	15 (±3)	37 (±3)	28 (±3)	6 (±3)	4 (±3)

== Result ==
The BJP won a majority with 47 seats. With BJP's alliance partner Shiromani Akali Dal (SAD), which won 1 seat, the NDA alliance of BJP and SAD won 48 seats.

Parties and coalitions	Popular vote			Seats	
Parties and coalitions	Votes	%	±pp	Won	+/−
Bharatiya Janata Party (BJP)	41,25,285	33.2	▲24.16%	47	▲43
Indian National Lok Dal (INLD)	29,96,203	24.1	▼1.68%	19	▼12
Indian National Congress (INC)	25,57,940	20.6	▼14.50%	15	▼25
Haryana Janhit Congress (BL) (HJC(BL))	4,43,444	3.6	▼3.8%	2	▼4
Bahujan Samaj Party (BSP)	5,42,985	4.4	▼2.36%	1	▼1
Shiromani Akali Dal (SAD)	76,985	0.6	▼0.38%	1	Steady
Independents	13,17,633	10.6	▼2.56%	5	▼4
None of the Above (NOTA)	53,613	0.4	-	—N/a	
Total	1,24,26,968	100.00		90	±0
Valid votes	1,24,26,968	99.94			
Invalid votes	7,311	0.06			
Votes cast / turnout	1,24,34,279	76.54			
Abstentions	38,69,463	23.46			
Registered voters	1,63,03,742				

== Results by district ==
Division	District	Seats					
Division	District	Seats	BJP	INLD	INC	IND	OTH
Ambala	Kurukshetra	4	3	1	—N/a	—N/a	—N/a
Ambala	Ambala	4	4	—N/a	—N/a	—N/a	—N/a
Ambala	Yamunanagar	4	4	—N/a	—N/a	—N/a	—N/a
Ambala	Panchkula	2	2	—N/a	—N/a	—N/a	—N/a
Faridabad	Faridabad	6	3	1	1	—N/a	1
Faridabad	Nuh	3	—N/a	2	—N/a	1	—N/a
Faridabad	Palwal	3	—N/a	1	2	—N/a	—N/a
Gurgaon	Mahendragarh	4	4	—N/a	—N/a	—N/a	—N/a
Gurgaon	Gurgaon	4	4	—N/a	—N/a	—N/a	—N/a
Gurgaon	Rewari	3	3	—N/a	—N/a	—N/a	—N/a
Hisar	Hisar	7	2	3	—N/a	—N/a	2
Hisar	Sirsa	5	—N/a	4	—N/a	—N/a	1
Hisar	Jind	5	1	3	—N/a	1	—N/a
Hisar	Fatehabad	3	1	2	—N/a	—N/a	—N/a
Karnal	Kaithal	4	1	—N/a	1	2	—N/a
Karnal	Panipat	4	3	—N/a	—N/a	1	—N/a
Karnal	Karnal	5	5	—N/a	—N/a	—N/a	—N/a
Rohtak	Sonipat	6	1	—N/a	5	—N/a	—N/a
Rohtak	Rohtak	4	1	—N/a	3	—N/a	—N/a
Rohtak	Jhajjar	4	2	—N/a	2	—N/a	—N/a
Rohtak	Bhiwani	4	2	1	1	—N/a	—N/a
Rohtak	Charkhi Dadri	2	1	1	—N/a	—N/a	—N/a
Total		90	47	19	15	5	4

== Results by constituency ==
District	Constituency		Winner				Runner Up				Margin	%
District	#	Name (Note: SC and ST indicate constituencies reserved for Scheduled Castes and Scheduled Tribes respectively.)	Candidate	Party	Votes	%	Candidate	Party	Votes	%	Margin	%
Panchkula	1	Kalka	Latika Sharma	BJP	50,347	40.42	Pardeep Ch.	INLD	31,320	25.14	19,027	15.28
Panchkula	2	Panchkula	Gian Chand Gupta	BJP	69,916	54.29	Kul Bhushan Goyal	INLD	25,314	19.66	44,602	34.63
Ambala	3	Naraingarh	Nayab Singh Saini	BJP	55,931	39.79	Ram Kishan	INC	31,570	22.46	24,361	17.33
Ambala	4	Ambala Cantt.	Anil Vij	BJP	66,605	52.49	Ch. Nirmal Singh	INC	51,143	40.31	15,462	12.18
Ambala	5	Ambala City	Aseem Goel	BJP	60,216	37.30	Venod Sharma	HJC(V) (Note: Haryana Jan Chetna Party (V))	36,964	22.90	23,252	14.40
Ambala	6	Mulana (SC)	Santosh Sarwan	BJP	49,970	32.16	Rajbir Singh	INLD	44,321	28.53	5,649	3.63
Yamunanagar	7	Sadhaura (SC)	Balwant Singh	BJP	63,772	38.74	Pinki Chhapper	INLD	49,626	30.15	14,146	8.59
Yamunanagar	8	Jagadhri	Kanwar Pal Gujjar	BJP	74,203	44.79	Akram Khan	BSP	40,047	24.18	34,156	20.61
Yamunanagar	9	Yamunanagar	Ghanshyam Dass	BJP	79,743	51.51	Dilbagh Singh	INLD	51,498	33.26	28,245	18.25
Yamunanagar	10	Radaur	Shyam Singh Rana	BJP	67,076	45.50	Raj Kumar Bubka	INLD	28,369	19.24	38,707	26.26
Kurukshetra	11	Ladwa	Pawan Saini	BJP	42,445	30.91	Bachan Kaur Barshami	INLD	39,453	28.73	2,992	2.18
Kurukshetra	12	Shahbad (SC)	Krishan Kumar	BJP	45,715	37.19	Ram Karan	INLD	45,153	36.74	562	0.45
Kurukshetra	13	Thanesar	Subhash Sudha	BJP	68,080	52.90	Ashok Kumar Arora	INLD	42,442	32.98	25,638	19.92
Kurukshetra	14	Pehowa	Jaswinder Singh	INLD	49,110	37.69	Jai Bhagwan Sharma	BJP	39,763	30.52	9,347	7.17
Kaithal	15	Guhla (SC)	Kulwant Ram Bazigar	BJP	36,598	27.70	Dillu Ram	INC	34,158	25.86	2,440	1.84
Kaithal	16	Kalayat	Jai Parkash	IND	51,106	33.44	Ram Pal Majra	INLD	42,716	27.95	8,390	5.49
Kaithal	17	Kaithal	Randeep Surjewala	INC	65,524	43.20	Kailash Bhagat	INLD	41,849	27.59	23,675	15.61
Kaithal	18	Pundri	Dinesh Kaushik	IND	38,312	27.78	Randhir Singh Gollen	BJP	33,480	24.28	4,832	3.50
Karnal	19	Nilokheri (SC)	Bhagwan Das	BJP	58,354	41.94	Mamu Ram	INLD	23,944	17.21	34,410	24.73
Karnal	20	Indri	Karan Dev Kamboj	BJP	45,756	32.58	Usha Kashyap	INLD	21,881	15.58	23,875	17.00
Karnal	21	Karnal	Manohar Lal Khattar	BJP	82,485	58.78	Jai Parkash Gupta	IND	18,712	13.33	63,773	45.45
Karnal	22	Gharaunda	Harvinder Kalyan	BJP	55,247	35.51	Narender Sangwan	INLD	37,364	24.02	17,883	11.49
Karnal	23	Assandh	Bakhshish Virk	BJP	30,723	19.45	Maratha V. Verma	BSP	26,115	16.53	4,608	2.92
Panipat	24	Panipat Rural	Mahipal Dhanda	BJP	62,074	40.08	Dhara Singh Rawal	IND	25,942	16.75	36,132	23.33
Panipat	25	Panipat City	Rohita Rewri	BJP	92,757	66.49	Virender Kumar Shah	INC	39,036	27.98	53,721	38.51
Panipat	26	Israna (SC)	Krishan Lal Panwar	BJP	40,277	32.58	Balbir Singh	INC	38,449	31.10	1,828	1.48
Panipat	27	Samalkha	Ravinder Machhrouli	IND	53,294	35.42	Dharam Chhoker	INC	32,921	21.88	20,373	13.54
Sonipat	28	Ganaur	Kuldeep Sharma	INC	46,146	38.36	Nirmal Rani	INLD	38,603	32.09	7,543	6.27
Sonipat	29	Rai	Jai Tirath Dahiya	INC	36,703	31.23	Inderjeet	INLD	36,700	31.22	3	0.01
Sonipat	30	Kharkhauda (SC)	Jaiveer Singh	INC	37,829	37.42	Pawan Kharkhoda	IND	23,647	23.39	14,182	14.03
Sonipat	31	Sonipat	Kavita Jain	BJP	56,832	45.80	Dev Raj Diwan	INC	31,022	25.00	25,810	20.80
Sonipat	32	Gohana	Jagbir Singh Malik	INC	41,393	35.36	Krishan C. Banger	INLD	38,165	32.60	3,228	2.76
Sonipat	33	Baroda	Krishan Hooda	INC	50,530	41.93	Kapoor Narwal	INLD	45,347	37.63	5,183	4.30
Jind	34	Julana	Parminder Dhull	INLD	54,632	44.00	Dharmender Singh Dhull	INC	31,826	25.63	22,806	18.37
Jind	35	Safidon	Jasbir Deswal	IND	29,369	21.93	Vandana Sharma	BJP	27,947	20.87	1,422	1.06
Jind	36	Jind	Hari Chand	INLD	31,631	25.99	Surender Barwala	BJP	29,374	24.13	2,257	1.86
Jind	37	Uchana Kalan	Premlata Singh	BJP	79,674	49.18	Dushyant Chautala	INLD	72,194	44.56	7,480	4.62
Jind	38	Narwana (SC)	Pirthi Singh	INLD	72,166	47.30	Santosh Rani	BJP	63,014	41.30	9,152	6.00
Fatehabad	39	Tohana	Subhash Barala	BJP	49,462	28.58	Nishan Singh	INLD	42,556	24.59	6,906	3.99
Fatehabad	40	Fatehabad	Balwan Daulatpuria	INLD	60,539	32.71	Dura Ram	HJC	57,034	30.82	3,505	1.89
Fatehabad	41	Ratia (SC)	Ravinder Baliala	INLD	50,905	32.43	Sunita Duggal	BJP	50,452	32.14	453	0.29
Sirsa	42	Kalawali (SC)	Balkaur Singh	SAD	54,112	40.32	Shishpal Keharwala	INC	41,147	30.66	12,965	9.66
Sirsa	43	Dabwali	Naina Singh Chautala	INLD	68,029	43.60	Kamalvir Singh	INC	59,484	38.12	8,545	5.48
Sirsa	44	Rania	Ramchand Kamboj	INLD	43,971	30.65	Gobind Kanda	HLP	39,656	27.64	4,315	3.01
Sirsa	45	Sirsa	Makhan Lal Singla	INLD	46,573	32.31	Gopal Goyal Kanda	HLP	43,635	30.27	2,938	2.04
Sirsa	46	Ellenabad	Abhay Singh Chautala	INLD	69,162	46.70	Pawan Beniwal	BJP	57,623	38.91	11,539	7.79
Hisar	47	Adampur	Kuldeep Bishnoi	HJC	56,757	47.10	Kulveer Beniwal	INLD	39,508	32.78	17,249	14.32
Hisar	48	Uklana (SC)	Anoop Dhanak	INLD	58,120	41.30	Seema Gaibipur	BJP	40,193	28.56	17,927	12.74
Hisar	49	Narnaund	Captain Abhimanyu	BJP	53,770	34.85	Raj Singh Mor	INLD	48,009	31.12	5,761	3.73
Hisar	50	Hansi	Renuka Bishnoi	HJC	46,335	35.45	Umed Singh Lohan	INLD	31,683	24.24	14,652	11.21
Hisar	51	Barwala	Ved Narang	INLD	34,941	27.76	Surender Punia	BJP	24,680	19.61	10,261	8.15
Hisar	52	Hisar	Kamal Gupta	BJP	42,285	38.81	Savitri Jindal	INC	28,639	26.28	13,646	12.53
Hisar	53	Nalwa	Ranbir Gangwa	INLD	41,950	35.89	Chander Mohan	HJC	34,835	29.80	7,115	6.09
Bhiwani	54	Loharu	Om Parkash Barwa	INLD	40,693	29.51	Jai Parkash Dalal	BJP	38,598	27.99	2,095	1.52
Charkhi Dadri	55	Badhra	Sukhvinder Sheoran	BJP	39,139	29.50	Ranbir Mahendra	INC	34,133	25.72	5,006	3.78
Charkhi Dadri	56	Dadri	Rajdeep Phogat	INLD	43,400	32.84	Somveer Sangwan	BJP	41,790	31.62	1,610	1.22
Bhiwani	57	Bhiwani	Ghanshyam Saraf	BJP	50,020	38.35	Nirmla Saraf	INLD	21,423	16.43	28,597	21.92
Bhiwani	58	Tosham	Kiran Choudhry	INC	58,218	38.48	Kamla Rani	INLD	38,477	25.43	19,741	13.05
Bhiwani	59	Bawani Khera (SC)	Bishamber Singh	BJP	47,323	33.51	Daya Bhurtana	INLD	44,764	31.70	2,559	1.81
Rohtak	60	Meham	Anand Singh Dangi	INC	50,728	37.57	Shamsher Kharkara	BJP	41,071	30.41	9,657	7.16
Rohtak	61	Garhi Sampla-Kiloi	Bhupinder Hooda	INC	80,693	57.31	Satish Nandal	INLD	33,508	23.80	47,185	33.51
Rohtak	62	Rohtak	Manish Grover	BJP	57,718	50.57	Bharat Bhushan Batra	INC	46,586	40.82	11,132	9.75
Rohtak	63	Kalanaur (SC)	Shakuntla Khatak	INC	50,451	39.65	Ram Avtar Balmiki	BJP	46,479	36.53	3,972	3.12
Jhajjar	64	Bahadurgarh	Naresh Kaushik	BJP	38,341	28.96	Rajinder Singh Joon	INC	33,459	25.27	4,882	3.69
Jhajjar	65	Badli	Om Prakash Dhankar	BJP	41,549	36.48	Kuldeep Vats	IND	32,283	28.35	9,266	8.13
Jhajjar	66	Jhajjar (SC)	Geeta Bhukkal	INC	51,697	48.26	Sadhu Ram	INLD	25,113	23.45	26,584	24.81
Jhajjar	67	Beri	Raghuvir Kadian	INC	36,793	31.64	Chatar Singh	IND	32,300	27.77	4,493	3.87
Mahendragarh	68	Ateli	Santosh Yadav	BJP	64,659	49.71	Satbir	INLD	16,058	12.35	48,601	37.36
Mahendragarh	69	Mahendragarh	Ram Bilas Sharma	BJP	83,724	59.89	Dan Singh Rao	INC	49,233	35.22	34,491	24.67
Mahendragarh	70	Narnaul	Om Parkash Yadav	BJP	31,664	32.80	Kamlesh	INLD	27,091	28.06	4,573	4.74
Mahendragarh	71	Nangal Chaudhry	Abhe Singh Yadav	BJP	33,929	33.35	Manju	INLD	32,948	32.39	981	0.96
Rewari	72	Bawal (SC)	Banwari Lal	BJP	72,792	52.86	Shyam Sunder	INLD	35,401	25.71	37,391	27.15
Rewari	73	Kosli	Bikram Thekedar	BJP	63,264	39.33	Jagdish Yadav	INLD	52,497	32.64	10,767	6.69
Rewari	74	Rewari	Randhir Kapriwas	BJP	81,103	52.92	Satish Yadav	INLD	35,637	23.25	45,466	29.67
Gurgaon	75	Pataudi (SC)	Bimla Chaudhary	BJP	75,198	56.15	Ganga Ram	INLD	36,235	27.05	38,963	29.10
Gurgaon	76	Badshahpur	Rao Narbir Singh	BJP	86,672	39.82	Rakesh Daultabad	INLD	68,540	31.49	18,132	8.33
Gurgaon	77	Gurgaon	Umesh Aggarwal	BJP	1,06,106	55.86	Gopi Chand Gahlot	INLD	22,011	11.59	84,095	44.27
Gurgaon	78	Sohna	Tejpal Tawar	BJP	53,797	36.20	Kishore Yadav	INLD	29,250	19.68	24,547	16.52
Nuh	79	Nuh	Zakir Hussain	INLD	64,221	52.35	Aftab Ahmed	INC	31,425	25.62	32,796	26.73
Nuh	80	Ferozepur Jhirka	Naseem Ahmed	INLD	40,320	29.47	Mamman Khan	IND	37,075	27.09	3,245	2.38
Nuh	81	Punahana	Rahish Khan	IND	34,281	29.56	Mohammad Ilyas	INLD	31,140	26.85	3,141	2.71
Palwal	82	Hathin	Kehar Singh	INLD	44,703	29.53	Harsh Kumar	BJP	38,331	25.32	6,372	4.21
Palwal	83	Hodal (SC)	Udai Bhan	INC	50,723	41.55	Jagdish Nayar	INLD	39,043	31.98	11,680	9.57
Palwal	84	Palwal	Karan Singh Dalal	INC	57,423	37.52	Deepak Mangla	BJP	51,781	33.83	5,642	3.69
Faridabad	85	Prithla	Tek Chand Sharma	BSP	37,178	27.56	Nayan Pal Rawat	BJP	35,999	26.68	1,179	0.88
Faridabad	86	Faridabad Nit	Nagender Bhadana	INLD	45,740	31.95	Pandit Shiv Charan	IND	42,826	29.91	2,914	2.04
Faridabad	87	Badkhal	Seema Trikha	BJP	70,218	52.51	Mahender Pratap Singh	INC	33,609	25.13	36,609	27.38
Faridabad	88	Ballabhgarh	Mool Chand Sharma	BJP	69,074	56.93	Lakhan Kumar Singla	INC	15,976	13.17	53,098	43.76
Faridabad	89	Faridabad	Vipul Goel	BJP	72,679	60.48	Anand Kaushik	INC	27,898	23.21	44,781	37.27
Faridabad	90	Tigaon	Lalit Nagar	INC	55,408	37.14	Rajesh Nagar	BJP	52,470	35.17	2,938	1.97

== Government formation ==
The BJP was scheduled to meet on 21 October to choose a chief minister; a swearing-in ceremony was expected before Diwali on 23 October. The BJP parliamentary board deputed Venkaiah Naidu and Dinesh Sharma as observers for the meeting. Leading contenders for the post were Rashtriya Swayamsevak Sangh activist Manohar Lal Khattar, Haryana BJP president Ram Bilas Sharma, BJP spokesperson Captain Abhimanyu, MP Krishan Pal Gurjar, MLA Anil Vij and BJP Kisan cell leader O. P. Dhankar. Khattar was speculated to be leading the race. Khattar was then chosen to head the new government and was sworn in on 26 October.

== Bypolls (2014-2019) ==
S.No	Date	Constituency	MLA before elections	Party before election	Elected MLA	Party after election
36	28 January 2019	Jind	Hari Chand Middha	Indian National Lok Dal	Krishan Lal Middha	Bharatiya Janata Party
