= List of parliamentary constituencies in Haryana =

== Lok Sabha ==
=== Current constituencies ===
The Lok Sabha (meaning "House of the People") is the lower house of the Parliament of India. The Indian state of Haryana elects 10 members and they are directly elected by the electorates of Haryana. Members are elected for five years. The number of seats, allocated to the state/union territory are determined by the population of the state/union territory.

Constituencies of the Lok Sabha in the state of Haryana

Keys: BJP (10)

Source: Parliament of India (Lok Sabha)

| No. | Name | Reserved for (SC/ST/None) | Assembly constituency segment | Current member | Party |
|---|---|---|---|---|---|
| 1 | Ambala | SC | Kalka, Panchkula, Naraingarh, Ambala Cantonment, Ambala City, Mulana (SC), Sadhaura (SC), Jagadhri, Yamunanagar | Varun Chaudhary | Indian National Congress |
| 2 | Kurukshetra | None | Radaur, Ladwa, Shahbad (SC), Thanesar, Pehowa, Guhla (SC), Kalayat, Kaithal, Pundri | Naveen Jindal | Bharatiya Janata Party |
| 3 | Sirsa | SC | Narwana (SC), Tohana, Fatehabad, Ratia (SC), Kalanwali (SC), Dabwali, Rania, Sirsa, Ellenabad | Selja Kumari | Indian National Congress |
| 4 | Hisar | None | Uchana Kalan, Adampur, Uklana (SC), Narnaund, Hansi, Barwala, Hisar, Nalwa, Bawani Khera (SC) | Jai Parkash | Indian National Congress |
| 5 | Karnal | None | Nilokheri (SC), Indri, Karnal, Gharaunda, Assandh, Panipat Rural, Panipat City, Israna (SC), Samalkha | Manohar Lal Khattar | Bharatiya Janata Party |
| 6 | Sonipat | None | 28 / Ganaur; 29 / Rai; 30 / Kharkhauda (SC); 31 / Sonipat; 32 / Gohana; 33 / Baroda; 34 / Julana; 35 / Safidon; 36 / Jind | Satpal Brahamchari | Indian National Congress |
| 7 | Rohtak | None | 60 / Meham; 61 / Garhi Sampla-Kiloi; 62 / Rohtak; 63 / Kalanaur (SC); 64 / Bahadurgarh; 65 / Badli; 66 / Jhajjar (SC); 67 / Beri; 73 / Kosli | Deepender Singh Hooda | Indian National Congress |
| 8 | Bhiwani–Mahendragarh | None | 54 / Loharu; 55 / Badhra; 56 / Dadri; 57 / Bhiwani; 58 / Tosham; 68 / Ateli; 69 / Mahendragarh; 70 / Narnaul; 71 / Nangal Chaudhry | Dharambir Singh Chaudhary | Bharatiya Janata Party |
| 9 | Gurgaon | None | 72 / Bawal (SC); 74 / Rewari; 75 / Pataudi (SC); 76 / Badshahpur; 77 / Gurgaon; 78 / Sohna; 79 / Nuh; 80 / Ferozepur Jhirka; 81 / Punahana | Rao Inderjit Singh | Bharatiya Janata Party |
| 10 | Faridabad | None | 82 / Hathin; 83 / Hodal (SC); 84 / Palwal; 85 / Prithla; 86 / Faridabad NIT; 87 / Badkhal; 88 / Ballabgarh; 89 / Faridabad; 90 / Tigaon | Krishan Pal Gurjar | Bharatiya Janata Party |

== Rajya Sabha ==
The Rajya Sabha (meaning the "Council of States") is the upper house of the Parliament of India. The Haryana state elects five members and they are indirectly elected by the state legislators of Haryana. The number of seats allocated to the party, are determined by the number of seats a party possesses during nomination and the party nominates a member to be voted on. Elections within the state legislatures are held using Single transferable vote with proportional representation.

=== Current members ===
Source: Parliament of India (Rajya Sabha)

| No. | Name | Party | Term start | Term end |
|---|---|---|---|---|
| 1 | Subhash Barala | BJP | 03-Apr-2024 | 02-Apr-2030 |
| 2 | Rekha Sharma | BJP | 13-Dec-2024 | 01-Aug-2028 |
| 3 | Kartikeya Sharma | IND | 02-Aug-2022 | 01-Aug-2028 |
| 4 | Ram Chander Jangra | BJP | 10-Apr-2020 | 09-Apr-2026 |
| 5 | Kiran Chaudhary | BJP | 10-Apr-2020 | 09-Apr-2026 |

== See also ==
- List of constituencies of the Lok Sabha
- List of constituencies of the Haryana Legislative Assembly
