= Adampur, Hisar =

Adampur Mandi Adampur
- Town
- Nickname: Mandi
- Location in Haryana, India Adampur (India)
- Coordinates: 29.2832°N 75.43°E
- Country: India
- State: Haryana
- District: Hisar

Government
  - Type: Municipal Committee
  - Member of legislative assembly: chanderparkash Jangra
- Elevation: 215 m (705 ft)

Languages
  - Official: Hindi, English
  - Regional: Bagri language
- Time zone: UTC+5:30 (IST)
- ISO 3166 code: IN-HR
- Vehicle registration: HR
- Website: http://Ourmandiadampur.com

Adampur, also Mandi Adampur, is a town, municipality, revenue tehsil, rural development block and Vidhan Sabha constituency in Hisar district of Hisar division of Haryana state in northern India. It is 38 km northwest of Hisar city.

== Administration and economy ==
Adampur has several government offices including BDO and municipality office, police stations, 132 KV electricity substation, agriculture marketing committee, market committee, farmer's rest house, women ad child welfare office, block agriculture office, PWD office, 3 water purification plants, railway station, bus stand, civil hospital, telephone exchange, post office, gas agency, 10 petrol stations, several banks, oil and cotton factories, etc.

== Politics ==
It is part of Adampur, Haryana Assembly constituency and Hisar Lok Sabha constituency.

== Notable people ==
- Subhash Chandra
- Bhajan Lal
- Chander Parkash

== See also ==
- Adampur in Amritsar district in Punjab
