= 2014 Indian general election in Haryana =

- 10 April 2014

10 seats of Lok Sabha in Haryana
- Turnout: 71.45% (▲3.94%)
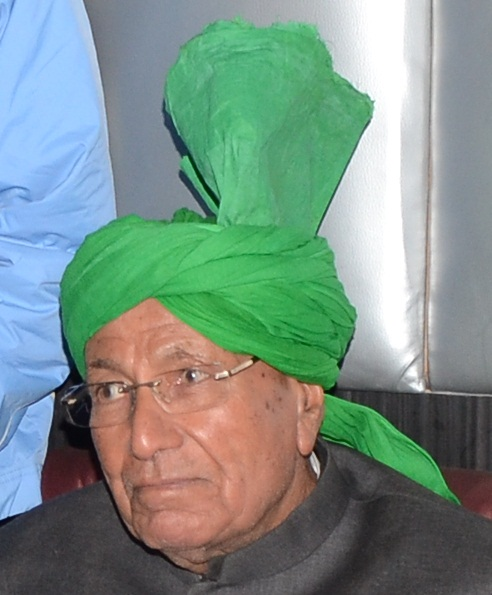

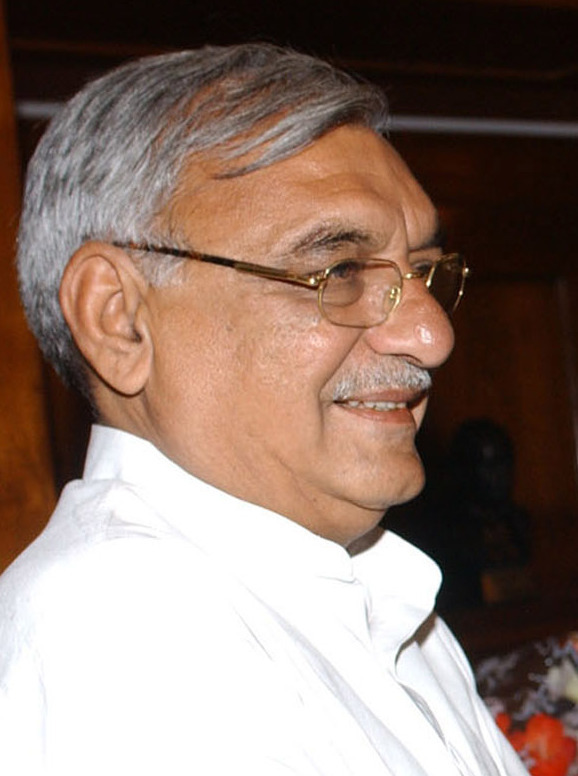

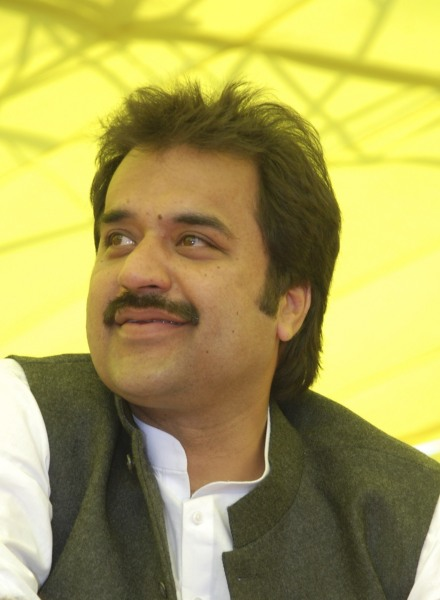
	First party	Second party
	BJP
Leader	Ram Bilas Sharma	Om Prakash Chautala
Party	BJP	INLD
Alliance	NDA
Last election	0	0
Seats won	7	2
Seat change	▲7	▲2
	Third party	Fourth party
Leader	Bhupinder Singh Hooda	Kuldeep Bishnoi
Party	INC	HJC(BL)
Alliance	UPA	NDA
Last election	9	1
Seats won	1	0
Seat change	▼8	▼1
- Seatwise Result Map of the 2014 general election in Haryana
Prime Minister before election
Manmohan Singh
INC
Prime Minister after election
Narendra Modi
BJP

The 2014 Indian general election polls in Haryana for 10 Lok Sabha seats will be held in a single phases on 10 April 2014. As of 11 February 2014 The total voter strength of Haryana is 15,594,427.

The main political parties in Haryana are Indian National Congress (INC), Bharatiya Janata Party (BJP), Haryana Janhit Congress (BL) (HJC) & Indian National Lok Dal (INLD).

== Parties and alliances ==
Party/Alliance Name		Flag	Electoral symbol	Leader	Seats contested
NDA	Bharatiya Janata Party			Ram Bilas Sharma	8
NDA	Haryana Janhit Congress (BL)			Kuldeep Bishnoi	2
Indian National Congress				Bhupinder Singh Hooda	10
Indian National Lok Dal				Om Prakash Chautala	10

== List of Candidates ==
Constituency		NDA		INC		INLD	
#	Name	Party	Candidate	Party	Candidate	Party	Candidate
1	Ambala	BJP	Rattan Lal Kataria	INC	Raj Kumar Balmiki	INLD	Dr. Kusum Sherwal
2	Kurukshetra	BJP	Raj Kumar Saini	INC	Naveen Jindal	INLD	Balbir Singh Saini
3	Sirsa	HJC	Dr. Sushil Indora	INC	Ashok Tanwar	INLD	Charanjeet Singh Rori
4	Hisar	HJC	Kuldeep Bishnoi	INC	Sampat Singh	INLD	Dushyant Chautala
5	Karnal	BJP	Ashwini Kumar Chopra	INC	Arvind Kumar Sharma	INLD	Jaswinder Singh Sandhu
6	Sonipat	BJP	Ramesh Chander Kaushik	INC	Jagbir Singh Malik	INLD	Padam Singh Dahiya
7	Rohtak	BJP	Om Prakash Dhankar	INC	Deepender Singh Hooda	INLD	Shamsher Singh Kharkara
8	Bhiwani-Mahendragarh	BJP	Dharambir Singh Chaudhary	INC	Shruti Choudhry	INLD	Bahadur Singh
9	Gurgaon	BJP	Rao Inderjit Singh	INC	Rao Dharampal	INLD	Zakir Hussain
10	Faridabad	BJP	Krishan Pal Gurjar	INC	Avtar Singh Bhadana	INLD	R. K. Anand

== Election schedule ==
Constituency wise Election schedule are given below-

Polling Day	Phase	Date	Constituencies
1	3	10 April	Ambala (SC)
1	3	10 April	Kurukshetra
1	3	10 April	Sirsa (SC)
1	3	10 April	Hisar
1	3	10 April	Karnal
1	3	10 April	Sonipat
1	3	10 April	Rohtak
1	3	10 April	Bhiwani–Mahendragarh
1	3	10 April	Gurgaon
1	3	10 April	Faridabad
1	3	10 April	Haryana

== Opinion Polls ==
Conducted in Month(s)	Ref	Polling Organisation/Agency				
Conducted in Month(s)	Ref	Polling Organisation/Agency	INC	BJP−HJC	INLD	Others
Aug–Oct 2013		Times Now-India TV-CVoter	5	4	1	0
Jan–Feb 2014		Times Now-India TV-CVoter	1	7	1	1
March 2014		NDTV- Hansa Research	3	7	0	0
April 2014		NDTV- Hansa Research	2	6	2	0

- UPA
- NDA
- INLD
- Others

== Results ==
=== Detailed Results ===
Alliance/ Party		Popular vote			Seats		
Alliance/ Party		Votes	%	±pp	Contested	Won	+/−
NDA	BJP	39,93,527	34.74	▲22.65	8	7	▲7
NDA	HJC(BL)	7,03,698	6.12	▼3.89	2	0	▼1
NDA	Total	46,97,225	40.86	Steady	10	7	Steady
INLD		27,99,899	24.36	▲8.59	10	2	▲2
INC		26,34,905	22.92	▼18.85	10	1	▼8
BSP		5,27,013	4.58	▼11.16	10	0	Steady
AAP		4,87,941	4.24	New	10	0	Steady
Others		1,22,670	1.07	Steady	59	0	Steady
IND		1,91,278	1.66	▼0.96	121	0	Steady
NOTA		34,220	0.30	New	10	Steady	Steady
Total		1,14,95,151	100%	-	230	10	-

=== Results by Party ===
The results of the elections were declared on 16 May 2014.

Party	BJP	INC	INLD	HJC(BL)	BSP	Others
Leader	Narendra Modi	Bhupinder Singh Hooda	Om Prakash Chautala	Kuldeep Bishnoi	Mayawati	
Votes	34.7%, 39,93,527	22.9%, 26,34,905	24.4%, 27,99,899	6.1%, 7,03,698	4.6%, 5,27,013	4.2%, 4,88,019
Seats	7 (70%)	1 (10%)	2 (20%)	0 (0.0%)	0 (0.0%)	0 (0.0%)
Seats	7 / 10	1 / 10	2 / 10	0 / 10	0 / 10	0 / 10

=== Results by Constituency ===
Constituency		Winner				Runner Up				Margin	%
#	Name	Candidate	Party	Votes	%	Candidate	Party	Votes	%	Margin	%
1	Ambala	Rattan Lal Kataria	BJP	612,121	50.17	Raj Kumar Balmiki	INC	272,047	22.30	340,074	27.87
2	Kurukshetra	Raj Kumar Saini	BJP	418,112	36.80	Balbir Singh Saini	INLD	288,376	25.38	129,736	11.42
3	Sirsa	Charanjeet Rori	INLD	506,370	39.58	Ashok Tanwar	INC	390,634	30.54	115,736	9.04
4	Hisar	Dushyant Chautala	INLD	494,478	42.75	Kuldeep Bishnoi	HJC	462,631	39.99	31,847	2.76
5	Karnal	Ashwini Chopra	BJP	594,817	49.83	Arvind Kumar Sharma	INC	234,670	19.66	360,147	30.17
6	Sonipat	Ramesh Kaushik	BJP	347,203	35.19	Jagbir Singh Malik	INC	269,789	27.35	77,414	7.84
7	Rohtak	Deepender Hooda	INC	490,063	46.86	Om Parkash Dhankar	BJP	319,436	30.55	170,627	16.31
8	Bhiwani-Mahendragarh	Dharambir Singh Ch.	BJP	404,542	39.22	Bahadur Singh	INLD	275,148	26.68	129,394	12.54
9	Gurgaon	Rao Inderjit Singh	BJP	644,780	48.82	Zakir Hussain	INLD	370,058	28.02	274,722	20.80
10	Faridabad	Krishan Pal Gurjar	BJP	652,516	57.70	Avtar Singh Bhadana	INC	185,643	16.42	466,873	41.28

== Post-election Union Council of Ministers from Haryana ==
#	Name	Constituency	Designation	Department	From	To	Party
1	Chaudhary Birender Singh	Rajya Sabha (Haryana)	Cabinet Minister	Rural Development; Panchayati Raj; Drinking Water and Sanitation	9 November 2014	5 July 2016	BJP
1	Chaudhary Birender Singh	Rajya Sabha (Haryana)	Cabinet Minister	Steel	5 July 2016	30 May 2019	BJP
2	Rao Inderjit Singh	Gurgaon	MoS (I/C)	Planning	27 May 2014	30 May 2019	BJP
2	Rao Inderjit Singh	Gurgaon	MoS (I/C)	Statistics and Programme Implementation	27 May 2014	9 November 2014	BJP
2	Rao Inderjit Singh	Gurgaon	MoS	Defence	27 May 2014	5 July 2016	BJP
2	Rao Inderjit Singh	Gurgaon	MoS	Urban Development; Housing and Urban Poverty Alleviation	5 July 2016	6 July 2017	BJP
2	Rao Inderjit Singh	Gurgaon	MoS	Housing and Urban Affairs	6 July 2017	3 September 2017	BJP
2	Rao Inderjit Singh	Gurgaon	MoS	Chemicals and Fertilizers	3 September 2017	30 May 2019	BJP
3	Krishan Pal Gurjar	Faridabad	MoS	Road Transport and Highways; Shipping	27 May 2014	9 November 2014	BJP
3	Krishan Pal Gurjar	Faridabad	MoS	Social Justice and Empowerment	9 November 2014	30 May 2019	BJP
4	Suresh Prabhu	Rajya Sabha (Haryana)	Cabinet Minister	Railways	9 November 2014	3 September 2017	BJP
4	Suresh Prabhu	Rajya Sabha (Haryana)	Cabinet Minister	Commerce and Industry	3 September 2017	30 May 2019	BJP
4	Suresh Prabhu	Rajya Sabha (Haryana)	Cabinet Minister	Civil Aviation	10 March 2018	30 May 2019	BJP

- Note: Suresh Prabhu represented Haryana in the Rajya Sabha until 22 June 2016, after which he represented Andhra Pradesh.

== Assembly segments wise lead of Parties ==
Party	Assembly segments	Position in Assembly (as of 2014 elections)
Bharatiya Janata Party	52	47
Indian National Lok Dal	16	19
Indian National Congress	15	15
Haryana Janhit Congress (BL)	7	2
Others	0	7
Total	90	
