= Rania Assembly constituency =

Legislative Assembly constituency in Haryana State, India

Coordinates: 29.53°N 74.84°E

- Constituency No. 44 for the Haryana Legislative Assembly

Constituency details
- Country: India
- Region: North India
- State: Haryana
- District: Sirsa
- Lok Sabha constituency: Sirsa
- Established: 2008
- Total electors: 1,89,033
- Reservation: None

Member of Legislative Assembly
- 15th Haryana Legislative Assembly
- Incumbent Arjun Chautala
- Party: Indian National Lok Dal
- Elected year: 2024
- Preceded by: Ranjit Singh Chautala

Rania is one of the 90 Legislative Assembly constituencies of Haryana state in India.

It is part of Sirsa district.

== Members of the Legislative Assembly ==
| Election | Name | Party |
|---|---|---|
Till 2009: Constituency did not exist
| 2009 | Krishan Lal | Indian National Lok Dal |
| 2014 | Ramchand Kamboj | Indian National Lok Dal |
| 2019 | Ranjit Singh Chautala | Independent |
| 2024 | Arjun Chautala | Indian National Lok Dal |

== Election results ==
=== Assembly election 2024 ===
2024 Haryana Legislative Assembly election: Rania
| Party | Candidate | Votes | % | ±% |
|---|---|---|---|---|
| INLD | Arjun Chautala | 43,914 | 30.41% | ▲23.62 |
| INC | Sarvmitra Kamboj | 39,723 | 27.51% | ▲21.26 |
| Independent | Ranjit Singh Chautala | 36,401 | 25.21% | ▼12.27 |
| BJP | Shishpal Kamboj | 15,707 | 10.88% | ▼3.54 |
| NOTA | None of the Above | 486 | 0.35% | New |
| Margin of victory | | 4,673 | 3.33% | ▲1.10 |
| Turnout | | 1,40,219 | 70.16% | ▲1.85 |
| Registered electors | | 1,89,033 | | ▲14.28 |
| BJP hold | | Swing | ▲8.09 | |

=== Assembly election 2019 ===
2019 Haryana Legislative Assembly election: Rania
| Party | Candidate | Votes | % | ±% |
|---|---|---|---|---|
| Independent | Ranjit Singh Chautala | 53,825 | 37.48% | New |
| HLP | Gobind Kanda | 34,394 | 23.95% | ▼3.66 |
| BJP | Ram Chand Kamboj | 20,709 | 14.42% | ▲0.64 |
| INLD | Ashok Kumar Verma | 9,753 | 6.79% | ▼23.82 |
| INC | Vineet Kamboj | 8,979 | 6.25% | ▼19.3 |
| JJP | Kuldeep Singh | 7,622 | 5.31% | New |
| Independent | Susheel Kumar | 1,903 | 1.33% | New |
| AAP | Amarjeet Singh Chani | 1,685 | 1.17% | New |
| BSP | Daya Ram Fatehpur Niyamat Khan | 889 | 0.62% | ▲0.08 |
| Independent | Rai Singh Gindran | 807 | 0.56% | New |
| LSP | Norang | 719 | 0.50% | New |
| Margin of victory | | 19,431 | 13.53% | ▲10.53 |
| Turnout | | 1,43,601 | 79.74% | ▼8.42 |
| Registered electors | | 1,80,084 | | ▲10.54 |
| Independent gain from INLD | | Swing | ▲6.87 | |

=== Assembly Election 2014 ===
2014 Haryana Legislative Assembly election: Rania
| Party | Candidate | Votes | % | ±% |
|---|---|---|---|---|
| INLD | Ram Chand Kamboj | 43,971 | 30.62% | ▼9.12 |
| HLP | Gobind Kanda | 39,656 | 27.61% | New |
| INC | Ranjit Singh Chautala | 36,703 | 25.55% | ▼11.17 |
| BJP | Jagdish Nehra | 19,790 | 13.78% | ▲12.96 |
| CPI | Jagtar Singh | 1,067 | 0.74% | ▼1.92 |
| HJC(BL) | Jagdish Mandholi Wala | 778 | 0.54% | ▼2.5 |
| BSP | Gurdeep Singh | 769 | 0.54% | ▼5.6 |
| Margin of victory | | 4,315 | 3.00% | ▼0.00 |
| Turnout | | 1,43,625 | 88.16% | ▲1.10 |
| Registered electors | | 1,62,915 | | ▲16.81 |
| INLD hold | | Swing | ▼9.12 | |

=== Assembly Election 2009 ===
2009 Haryana Legislative Assembly election: Rania
| Party | Candidate | Votes | % | ±% |
|---|---|---|---|---|
| INLD | Krishan Lal S/O Ram Chand | 48,241 | 39.73% | New |
| INC | Ranjit Singh Chautala | 44,590 | 36.73% | New |
| Independent | Satdev | 11,338 | 9.34% | New |
| BSP | Veer Singh | 7,449 | 6.14% | New |
| HJC(BL) | Gurmit Singh | 3,695 | 3.04% | New |
| CPI | Swaran Singh Virk | 3,231 | 2.66% | New |
| BJP | Shishpal Kamboj | 998 | 0.82% | New |
| Independent | Sagar Mal | 902 | 0.74% | New |
| Margin of victory | | 3,651 | 3.01% | |
| Turnout | | 1,21,415 | 87.06% | |
| Registered electors | | 1,39,469 | | |
| INLD win (new seat) | | | | |

== See also ==
- List of constituencies of the Haryana Legislative Assembly
- Sirsa district
