= Adampur, Haryana Assembly constituency =

Constituency of the Haryana legislative assembly in India

Coordinates: 29.28°N 75.47°E

Adampur
- Constituency No. 47 for the Haryana Legislative Assembly

Constituency details
- Country: India
- Region: North India
- State: Haryana
- District: Hisar
- Total electors: 1,78,492
- Reservation: None

Member of Legislative Assembly
- 15th Haryana Legislative Assembly
- Incumbent Chander Parkash
- Party: Indian National Congress
- Elected year: 2024

Adampur Assembly constituency in Hisar district is one of the 90 constituencies of the Haryana Legislative Assembly in Haryana state in northern India. It is one of the nine assembly segments which make up Hisar Lok Sabha constituency.

== Members of Assembly ==
Year	Member	Party
1967	Ch. Hari Singh Mohil	Indian National Congress
1968	Bhajan Lal Bishnoi	Indian National Congress
1972	Bhajan Lal Bishnoi	Indian National Congress
1977	Bhajan Lal Bishnoi	Janata Party
1982	Bhajan Lal Bishnoi	Indian National Congress
1987	Jasma Devi Bishnoi	Indian National Congress
1991	Bhajan Lal Bishnoi	Indian National Congress
1996	Bhajan Lal Bishnoi	Indian National Congress
1998^	Kuldeep Bishnoi	Indian National Congress
2000	Bhajan Lal Bishnoi	Indian National Congress
2005	Bhajan Lal Bishnoi	Indian National Congress
2008^	Bhajan Lal Bishnoi	Haryana Janhit Congress
2009	Kuldeep Bishnoi	Haryana Janhit Congress
2011^	Renuka Bishnoi	Haryana Janhit Congress
2014	Kuldeep Bishnoi	Haryana Janhit Congress
2019	Kuldeep Bishnoi	Indian National Congress
2022^	Bhavya Bishnoi	Bharatiya Janata Party
2024	Chander Prakash Jangra	Indian National Congress

== Election results ==
=== Assembly Election 2024 ===
2024 Haryana Legislative Assembly election: Adampur
Party	Candidate	Votes	%	±%
INC	Chander Parkash	65,371	48.17	▲8.69
BJP	Bhavya Bishnoi	64,103	47.24	▼4.26
INLD	Randeep Choudaryvas	1,869	1.38	New
AAP	Bhupender Beniwal	1,814	1.34	▼1.27
JJP	Krishan Gangwa Parjapati	1,297	0.96	New
NOTA	None of the Above	390	0.29	▲0.11
Margin of victory		1,268	0.93	▼11.07
Turnout		1,35,697	75.96	▼0.19
Registered electors		1,78,492		▲3.80
INC gain from BJP		Swing	▼3.32	

=== Assembly By-election 2022 ===
Kuldeep Bishnoi resigned from the assembly seat in August 2022 and joined BJP. As a result, a by-poll was necessitated.

2022 Haryana Legislative Assembly by-election: Adampur
Party	Candidate	Votes	%	±%
BJP	Bhavya Bishnoi	67,492	51.50	▲23.72
INC	Jai Parkash	51,752	39.49	▼12.21
INLD	Kurda Ram Nambardar	5,248	4.00	
AAP	Satinder Singh Neoli	3,420	2.61	New
NOTA	Nota	236	0.18	▼0.35
Margin of victory		15,740	12.01	▼11.91
Turnout		1,31,065	76.29	▲0.43
Registered electors		1,72,117		▲5.77
BJP gain from INC		Swing	▼0.20	

=== Assembly Election 2019 ===
2019 Haryana Legislative Assembly election: Adampur
Party	Candidate	Votes	%	±%
INC	Kuldeep Bishnoi	63,693	51.70	▲43.23
BJP	Sonali Phogat	34,222	27.78	▲20.88
JJP	Ramesh Kumar	15,457	12.55	New
CPI(M)	Suresh	2,088	1.69	New
INLD	Rajesh Godara	1,994	1.62	▼31.14
BSP	Satvir	1,988	1.61	▲0.65
Independent	Sanjay	1,414	1.15	New
NOTA	Nota	649	0.53	New
Margin of victory		29,471	23.92	▲9.62
Turnout		1,23,208	75.72	▼2.57
Registered electors		1,62,720		▲5.61
INC gain from HJC(BL)		Swing	▲4.64	

=== Assembly Election 2014 ===
2014 Haryana Legislative Assembly election: Adampur
Party	Candidate	Votes	%	±%
HJC(BL)	Kuldeep Bishnoi	56,757	47.06	▲1.31
INLD	Kulveer Singh Beniwal	39,508	32.75	▲24.52
INC	Satinder Singh	10,209	8.46	▼31.58
BJP	Karan Singh Ranolia	8,319	6.90	▲5.75
Independent	Subhash Chander	1,527	1.27	New
BSP	Satbir Chhimpa	1,167	0.97	▼1.81
Independent	Harpal Nokhwal	647	0.54	New
Republican Backward Congress	Kulwant Singh	646	0.54	New
Margin of victory		17,249	14.30	▲8.59
Turnout		1,20,617	78.29	▼2.93
Registered electors		1,54,074		▲18.71
HJC(BL) hold		Swing	▲1.31	

=== Assembly Election 2009 ===
2009 Haryana Legislative Assembly election: Adampur
Party	Candidate	Votes	%	±%
HJC(BL)	Kuldeep Bishnoi	48,224	45.75	New
INC	Jai Prakash	42,209	40.04	▼37.87
INLD	Rajesh Godara	8,676	8.23	▼6
BSP	Rajesh Kumar	2,930	2.78	▲0.49
BJP	Pawan Kharia	1,210	1.15	▼2.95
Independent	Santlal	938	0.89	New
Margin of victory		6,015	5.71	▼57.97
Turnout		1,05,409	81.22	▲2.10
Registered electors		1,29,790		▼8.01
HJC(BL) gain from INC		Swing	▼32.16	

=== Assembly Election 2005 ===
2005 Haryana Legislative Assembly election: Adampur
Party	Candidate	Votes	%	±%
INC	Bhajan Lal	86,963	77.91	▲8.04
INLD	Rajesh Godara	15,882	14.23	New
BJP	Dalbir Dhiranwas	4,573	4.10	▼14.83
BSP	Rajender	2,559	2.29	▲1.12
Margin of victory		71,081	63.68	▲12.74
Turnout		1,11,620	79.11	▲5.20
Registered electors		1,41,094		▲15.34
INC hold		Swing	▲8.04	

=== Assembly Election 2000 ===
2000 Haryana Legislative Assembly election: Adampur
Party	Candidate	Votes	%	±%
INC	Bhajan Lal	63,174	69.87	▲54.05
BJP	Ganeshi Lal	17,117	18.93	New
HVP	Kurra	3,416	3.78	▼28.64
Independent	Bir Singh	2,642	2.92	New
BSP	Rajender	1,062	1.17	New
Independent	Hawa Singh S/O Gugan Ram	720	0.80	New
Independent	Vikas	647	0.72	New
Independent	Jai Pal	597	0.66	New
Margin of victory		46,057	50.94	▲43.81
Turnout		90,415	73.98	▼1.70
Registered electors		1,22,326		▼7.86
INC win (new seat)				

=== Assembly Election 1996 ===
1996 Haryana Legislative Assembly election: Adampur
Party	Candidate	Votes	%	±%
INC	Bhajan Lal	54,140	57.15	▼8.55
HVP	Surender Singh	34,133	36.03	▲28.35
SAP	Gurmesh	3,581	3.78	New
Janhit Morcha	Kanshi Ram	569	0.60	New
Margin of victory		20,007	21.12	▼22.02
Turnout		94,736	79.66	▲6.55
Registered electors		1,21,945		▲18.44
INC hold		Swing	▼8.55	

=== Assembly Election 1991 ===
1991 Haryana Legislative Assembly election: Adampur
Party	Candidate	Votes	%	±%
INC	Bhajan Lal	48,117	65.70	▲10.62
JP	Hari Singh	16,521	22.56	New
HVP	Nar Singh	5,622	7.68	New
BJP	Sher Singh	1,038	1.42	New
Independent	Devi Lal	934	1.28	New
Margin of victory		31,596	43.14	▲30.73
Turnout		73,243	72.74	▼4.44
Registered electors		1,02,960		▲4.15
INC hold		Swing	▲10.62	

=== Assembly Election 1987 ===
1987 Haryana Legislative Assembly election: Adampur
Party	Candidate	Votes	%	±%
INC	Jasma Devi	41,152	55.08	▼12.98
LKD	Dharam Pal Singh	31,880	42.67	▲14.44
Independent	Ramji Lal	452	0.60	New
Margin of victory		9,272	12.41	▼27.42
Turnout		74,714	77.17	▼1.06
Registered electors		98,853		▲22.12
INC hold		Swing		

=== Assembly Election 1982 ===
1982 Haryana Legislative Assembly election: Adampur
Party	Candidate	Votes	%	±%
INC	Bhajan Lal	42,227	68.06	New
LKD	Nar Singh Bishnoi	17,515	28.23	New
Independent	Duni Chand	710	1.14	New
Independent	Narain Dass	593	0.96	New
Independent	Chhaju Ram	513	0.83	New
Margin of victory		24,712	39.83	▼2.72
Turnout		62,040	77.89	▲5.10
Registered electors		80,950		▲18.44
INC gain from JP		Swing	▲0.18	

=== Assembly Election 1977 ===
1977 Haryana Legislative Assembly election: Adampur
Party	Candidate	Votes	%	±%
JP	Bhajan Lal	33,193	67.89	New
Independent	Mohar Singh	12,390	25.34	New
Independent	Madan Lal	1,703	3.48	New
Independent	Ram Singh	721	1.47	New
Independent	Suraj Bhan	659	1.35	New
Margin of victory		20,803	42.55	▲19.61
Turnout		48,893	72.21	▼5.88
Registered electors		68,346		▲10.72
JP gain from INC		Swing	▲7.35	

=== Assembly Election 1972 ===
1972 Haryana Legislative Assembly election: Adampur
Party	Candidate	Votes	%	±%
INC	Bhajan Lal	28,928	60.54	▲1.27
Independent	Devi Lal	17,967	37.60	New
SSP	Net Ram	892	1.87	New
Margin of victory		10,961	22.94	▼2.15
Turnout		47,787	79.18	▲7.46
Registered electors		61,728		▲7.87
INC hold		Swing		

=== Assembly Election 1968 ===
1968 Haryana Legislative Assembly election: Adampur
Party	Candidate	Votes	%	±%
INC	Bhajan Lal	23,723	59.26	▲58.83
Independent	Balraj Singh	13,679	34.17	New
SSP	Net Ram	2,080	5.20	▲5.14
Independent	Balu Ram	547	1.37	New
Margin of victory		10,044	25.09	▲24.45
Turnout		40,029	71.63	▼1.92
Registered electors		57,223		▲5.30
INC hold		Swing	▲15.86	

=== Assembly Election 1967 ===
1967 Haryana Legislative Assembly election: Adampur
Party	Candidate	Votes	%	±%
INC	H. Singh	16,955	43.41	New
Independent	R. Singh	16,704	42.77	New
SSP	Net Ram	2,172	5.56	New
SWA	S. Bhan	2,040	5.22	New
Independent	P. Singh	529	1.35	New
Independent	Shankar	238	0.61	New
Independent	Mani Ram	221	0.57	New
Independent	I. Sain	200	0.51	New
Margin of victory		251	0.64	
Turnout		39,059	74.34	
Registered electors		54,341		
INC win (new seat)				

== See also ==
- List of constituencies of the Haryana Legislative Assembly
- Hisar district
