= Bhavya Bishnoi =

Indian politician

State President of the Bharatiya Janata Yuva Morcha
- Incumbent
- Assumed office 28 April 2024
- National President: Tejasvi Surya
- State: Haryana

Member of the Haryana Legislative Assembly
- In office 7 November 2022 – 6 October 2024
- Preceded by: Kuldeep Bishnoi
- Succeeded by: Chander Parkash
- Constituency: Adampur

Personal details
- Born: 16 February 1993 (age 33) New Delhi, India
- Party: Bharatiya Janata Party (2022–present)
- Other political affiliations: Indian National Congress (until 2022)
- Spouse: Pari Bishnoi (m. 2023)
- Relations: Bhajan Lal (grandfather)
- Parent(s): Kuldeep Bishnoi (father); Renuka Bishnoi (mother)

Bhavya Bishnoi (born 16 February 1993) is an Indian politician from the Bharatiya Janata Party. He was elected to the Haryana Legislative Assembly from the Adampur constituency in the November 2022 by-election. He was the youngest member of the Haryana Legislative Assembly until 2024 when he lost the 2024 Haryana Legislative Assembly election from Adampur.

== Early life and education ==
Bhavya was born to Kuldeep Bishnoi and Renuka Bishnoi on 16 February 1993 in New Delhi, India. His father is a two-time former Member of Parliament, and four-time Member of the Haryana Legislative Assembly. His mother, Renuka Bishnoi, is also a two-time Member of the Haryana Legislative Assembly. He is the eldest of three children, having a brother and sister. His brother, Chaitanya, is a cricketer who played for Haryana in Indian domestic cricket and represented Chennai Super Kings in the IPL.

He is the grandson of Bhajan Lal Bishnoi, the famous political horse-trader, former three-time Chief Minister of the Indian state of Haryana, as well as former Union Minister for Agriculture and Environment in the Government of India.

Bhavya completed his schooling at The Shri Ram School, Gurugram. Bhavya earned a bachelor's degree in Government and Economics from the London School of Economics and Political Science in London, United Kingdom. Thereafter, he read Modern South Asian Studies (MSc) at Oxford University. He also attended Harvard Kennedy School. Bishnoi left Harvard without finishing his degree.

In 2018, Bhavya founded Bhajan Global Impact Foundation (BGIF). Prior to that, Bhavya was Special Projects Lead at the Global Education & Leadership Foundation (tGELF).

== Political career ==
Bhavya was the youngest Member of Haryana's Legislative Assembly from Adampur until 2024. Prior to this, he contested the 2019 Indian general elections from the Hisar Lok Sabha constituency under the Indian National Congress, however he lost to Brijendra Singh from the Bharatiya Janata Party.

On 3 August 2022, Bhavya's father, Kuldeep Bishnoi, joined the Bharatiya Janata Party and resigned from the Adampur constituency. In private, Bhavya had been a vocal opponent of the BJP, so many believe his sudden switch was related to a deal dropping the investigation into his father for corruption and bribery. Bhavya under the Bharatiya Janata Party defeated the Indian National Congress candidate Jai Prakash in a bypoll election by a margin of 15,740 votes with a total voter turnout of 67,492 votes.

In the 2024 Haryana Legislative Assembly election, Bhavya lost to Congress candidate Chander Prakash. Bishnoi family lost the seat after 56 years.

== Personal life ==
Bishnoi was in a relationship with actress Mehreen Pirzada since 2020 and the couple got engaged in 2021. However, the engagement was called off after four months. He married Indian Administrative Service officer Pari Bishnoi on 24 December 2023.
