= Chaitanya Bishnoi =

Indian cricketer (born 1994)

Personal information
- Born: 25 August 1994 (age 31); Delhi, India
- Batting: Left-handed
- Bowling: Slow left-arm orthodox
- Role: Batting all-rounder

Domestic team information
- Years: Team
- 2013–2015: Durham MCCU
- 2015/16–2022/23: Haryana
- Source: ESPNcricinfo, 25 February 2021

Chaitanya Bishnoi (born 25 August 1994) is an Indian cricketer who represented Haryana.

== Early life and education ==
Bishnoi was born in Delhi on 25 August 1994. He studied at Durham University, where he was a member of Hatfield College and represented Durham MCCU in cricket. He received a half-palatinate for cricket while at Durham.

== Cricket career ==
Bishnoi played first-class cricket for Durham MCCU from 2013 to 2015 before joining Haryana. He made his Twenty20 debut for Haryana against Hyderabad on 6 January 2016 during the 2015–16 Syed Mushtaq Ali Trophy.

In January 2018, Bishnoi was bought by the Chennai Super Kings at the 2018 IPL auction. He remained with the franchise for two seasons without making an IPL appearance and was released ahead of the 2020 IPL auction.

== Personal ==
His brother, Bhavya Bishnoi, is a politician and their parents, Kuldeep Bishnoi and Renuka Bishnoi, have both served in the Haryana Legislative Assembly. He is the grandson of Bhajan Lal, who served as Chief Minister of Haryana.
