= Tek Chand (disambiguation) =

Tek Chand is an Indian paralympic shot putter and javelin thrower.

Tek Chand may also refer to:

- Tek Chand Sharma (Delhi politician), Indian politician
- Tek Chand Sharma (Haryana politician), Indian politician
