= Waqt ki Awaz (newspaper) =

Waqt ki Awaz ('Voice of Time') was a Hindi language weekly newspaper, published from Hissar, Haryana, India. The newspaper was founded in 1953. It was printed at Subhas Printing Press.
