= Prithla Assembly constituency =

Legislative Assembly constituency in Haryana State, India

Coordinates: 28.23°N 77.29°E

Prithla
- Constituency No. 85 for the Haryana Legislative Assembly

Constituency details
- Country: India
- Region: North India
- State: Haryana
- District: Faridabad
- Lok Sabha constituency: Faridabad
- Total electors: 2,25,354
- Reservation: None

Member of Legislative Assembly
- 15th Haryana Legislative Assembly
- Incumbent Raghubir Tewatia
- Party: Indian National Congress
- Elected year: 2024

Prithla Assembly constituency is one of the 90 Legislative Assembly constituencies of Haryana state in India. It is part of Faridabad district.

== Members of the Legislative Assembly ==
Year	Member	Party
Till 2009: Constituency did not exist
2009	Raghubir Tewatia	Indian National Congress
2014	Tek Chand Sharma	Bahujan Samaj Party
2019	Nayan Pal Rawat	Independent
2024	Raghubir Tewatia	Indian National Congress

== Election results ==
=== Assembly Election 2024 ===
2024 Haryana Legislative Assembly election: Prithla
Party	Candidate	Votes	%	±%
INC	Raghubir Tewatia	70,262	42.02	▲9.25
BJP	Tek Chand Sharma	49,721	29.74	▲15.24
Independent	Nayan Pal Rawat	22,023	13.17	New
Independent	Deepak Dagar	16,055	9.60	New
BSP	Surender Vashisht	4,412	2.64	▼3.11
Independent	Abdut Nath	961	0.57	New
NOTA	None of the Above	666	0.40	▼0.04
Margin of victory		20,541	12.29	▲1.11
Turnout		1,67,191	73.91	▼2.80
Registered electors		2,25,354		▲18.01
INC gain from Independent		Swing	▼1.93	

=== Assembly Election 2019 ===
2019 Haryana Legislative Assembly election: Prithla
Party	Candidate	Votes	%	±%
Independent	Nayan Pal Rawat	64,625	43.95	New
INC	Raghubir Tewatia	48,196	32.78	▲7.03
BJP	Sohan Pal	21,322	14.50	▼12.17
BSP	Surender	8,460	5.75	▼21.79
INLD	Narender Singh	1,165	0.79	▼14.74
LSP	Kalyan Sharma	1,026	0.70	New
Independent	Rajesh	747	0.51	New
Margin of victory		16,429	11.17	▲10.30
Turnout		1,47,039	76.71	▼4.38
Registered electors		1,91,676		▲15.14
Independent gain from BSP		Swing	▲16.41	

=== Assembly Election 2014 ===
2014 Haryana Legislative Assembly election: Prithla
Party	Candidate	Votes	%	±%
BSP	Tek Chand Sharma	37,178	27.54	▼3.97
BJP	Nayan Pal Rawat	35,999	26.67	▲14.89
INC	Raghubir Tewatia	34,753	25.74	▼8.92
INLD	Rajinder Singh Bisla	20,969	15.53	▼3.86
HJC(BL)	Rakesh Kumar	4,060	3.01	▲2.32
NOTA	None of the Above	691	0.51	New
Margin of victory		1,179	0.87	▼2.28
Turnout		1,34,998	81.09	▲7.24
Registered electors		1,66,469		▲22.99
BSP gain from INC		Swing	▼7.12	

=== Assembly Election 2009 ===
2009 Haryana Legislative Assembly election: Prithla
Party	Candidate	Votes	%	±%
INC	Raghubir Tewatia	34,647	34.66	New
BSP	Tek Chand Sharma	31,492	31.51	New
INLD	Sashi Bala Tewatia	19,382	19.39	New
BJP	Nayan Pal Rawat	11,771	11.78	New
HJC(BL)	Nirmala Panchal	684	0.68	New
Independent	Satpal	670	0.67	New
Margin of victory		3,155	3.16	
Turnout		99,955	73.85	
Registered electors		1,35,348		
INC win (new seat)				

== See also ==
- List of constituencies of the Haryana Legislative Assembly
- Faridabad district
