= Renuka Bishnoi =

Indian politician (born 1973)

Member of Haryana Legislative Assembly
- In office 2014–2019
- Preceded by: Vinod Bhayana
- Succeeded by: Vinod Bhayana
- Constituency: Hansi

Personal details
- Born: 1 September 1973 (age 52) Sangaria, Rajasthan, India
- Citizenship: Indian
- Party: BJP
- Other political affiliations: Indian National Congress (earlier HJC (BL) which merged in 2016) till 2022
- Spouse: Kuldeep Bishnoi
- Children: 3, including Bhavya Bishnoi; Chaitanya Bishnoi
- Profession: Social work; business

Renuka Bishnoi (born 1 September 1973) is an Indian politician from BJP and a member of the Haryana Legislative Assembly. She was elected from Hansi in October 2014 on a Haryana Janhit Congress ticket.

== Personal life ==
She is married to Kuldeep Bishnoi and has 3 children, Bhavya Bishnoi, Chaitanya Bishnoi and Sia Bishnoi.
