= Parmod Kumar Vij =

Indian politician

Parmod Kumar Vij is an Indian politician. He was elected to the Haryana Legislative Assembly from Panipat City in the 2019 and 2024 Haryana Legislative Assembly election as a member of the Bharatiya Janata Party.
