= Panipat City Assembly constituency =

Constituency of the Haryana legislative assembly in India

Coordinates: 29.40°N 76.96°E

- Constituency No. 25 for the Haryana Legislative Assembly

Constituency details
- Country: India
- Region: North India
- State: Haryana
- District: Panipat
- Lok Sabha constituency: Karnal
- Established: 2009
- Total electors: 2,30,265
- Reservation: None
- Elected year: 2024

Panipat City is one of the 90 constituencies in the Haryana Legislative Assembly of Haryana a northern state of India. Panipat City is also part of Karnal Lok Sabha constituency.

== Members of the Legislative Assembly ==
Year	Member	Party
Till 2009: Constituency did not exist
2009	Balbir Pal Shah	Indian National Congress
2014	Rohita Rewri	Bharatiya Janata Party
2019	Parmod Kumar Vij	Bharatiya Janata Party
2024	Parmod Kumar Vij	Bharatiya Janata Party

== Election results ==
=== Assembly Election 2024 ===
2024 Haryana Legislative Assembly election: Panipat City
Party	Candidate	Votes	%	±%
BJP	Parmod Kumar Vij	81,750	55.66	▼7.18
INC	Varinder Kumar Shah	46,078	31.37	▲0.87
Independent	Rohita Rewri	15,546	10.59	New
NOTA	None of the Above	702	0.48	▼0.93
Margin of victory		35,672	24.29	▼8.04
Turnout		1,46,863	62.76	▲7.27
Registered electors		2,30,265		▲6.16
BJP hold		Swing	▼7.18	

=== Assembly Election 2019 ===
2019 Haryana Legislative Assembly election: Panipat City
Party	Candidate	Votes	%	±%
BJP	Parmod Kumar Vij	76,863	62.84	▼3.65
INC	Sanjay Aggarwal	37,318	30.51	▲2.53
JJP	Jaidev Naultha	2,246	1.84	
BSP	Ramesh Singla	1,787	1.46	▲0.59
NOTA	Nota	1,725	1.41	
LSP	Vijay Kumar Kalra	783	0.64	
Margin of victory		39,545	32.33	▼6.18
Turnout		1,22,315	55.49	▼13.10
Registered electors		2,20,440		▲8.37
BJP hold		Swing	▼3.65	

=== Assembly Election 2014 ===
2014 Haryana Legislative Assembly election: Panipat City
Party	Candidate	Votes	%	±%
BJP	Rohita Rewri	92,757	66.49	▲40.94
INC	Virender Kumar Shah	39,036	27.98	▼10.44
INLD	Neelam Narang	2,630	1.89	▼21.35
Independent	Dharam Pal Gupta	1,321	0.95	
BSP	Ramesh Chand	1,213	0.87	▼2.58
Margin of victory		53,721	38.51	▲25.63
Turnout		1,39,511	68.59	▲3.02
Registered electors		2,03,410		▲41.20
BJP gain from INC		Swing	▲28.06	

=== Assembly Election 2009 ===
2009 Haryana Legislative Assembly election: Panipat City
Party	Candidate	Votes	%	±%
INC	Balbir Pal Shah	36,294	38.42	
BJP	Sanjay Bhatia	24,135	25.55	
INLD	Suresh Mittal	21,949	23.24	
HJC(BL)	Vinod Wadhera	5,953	6.30	
BSP	Kapil	3,259	3.45	
NCP	Ranjeet Bhola	659	0.70	
Independent	Susheel Sharma	476	0.50	
Margin of victory		12,159	12.87	
Turnout		94,455	65.57	
Registered electors		1,44,053		
INC win (new seat)				

== See also ==
- Panipat
- Panipat district
- List of constituencies of Haryana Legislative Assembly
