= Ranjit Singh Chautala =

Indian politician (born 1945)

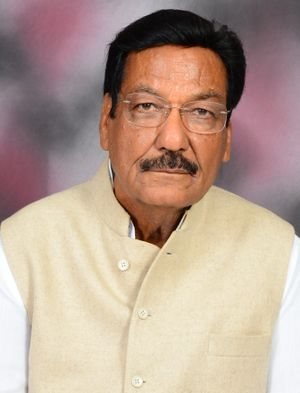

Cabinet Minister Government of Haryana
- In office 14 November 2019 – 17 October 2024
- Ministry: Term
- Minister of Power: 14 November 2019
- Minister of Minister of New and Renewable energy: 14 November 2019
- Minister of Jail: 14 November 2019

Member of the Haryana Legislative Assembly
- In office 2019 – 26 March 2024
- Preceded by: Ramchand Kamboj
- Succeeded by: Arjun Chautala
- Constituency: Rania
- In office 1987–1990
- Preceded by: Jagdish Mehra
- Succeeded by: Jagdish Mehra
- Constituency: Rori

Deputy Chairman of State Planning Board, Government of Haryana
- In office 2005–2009

Member of Parliament, Rajya Sabha
- In office 12 September 1990 – 1 August 1992
- Constituency: Haryana

Minister of Agriculture Government of Haryana
- In office 1987–1990

Personal details
- Born: 18 May 1945 (age 81) Chautala Sirsa
- Party: Independent
- Other political affiliations: INLD, Janata Dal, Congress, BJP
- Spouse: Smt Indira Sihag
- Children: Gagandeep Singh
- Parent(s): Chaudhary Devi Lal; Smt Harki Devi
- Relatives: Surya Prakash Singh (grandson)
- Education: Punjab University, Chandigarh

Ranjit Singh Chautala is a politician and businessman from the Indian state of Haryana. Elected to the Haryana Legislative Assembly and the Rajya Sabha, he has also served in ministerial posts. Previously a member of the Indian National Lok Dal, the Janata Dal, the Indian National Congress and the Bharatiya Janata Party, he won the seat of Rania in the 2019 Haryana Assembly elections as an independent. Following the election, along with his grandnephew Dushyant Chautala, he supported the BJP to secure a majority and entered the Second Manohar Lal Khattar ministry with three portfolios: New and Renewable Energy, Power and Jails.

== Family ==
Ranjit Singh is son of Chaudhary Devi Lal Chautala who served twice as the former Deputy Prime Minister of India. He belongs to a very powerful family who participated in freedom struggle of India. Ranjit Singh's uncle Sahib Ram Sihag was a member of assembly in 1937 and 1946 and his father Devi Lal in Politics since 1951.

== Career ==
In 1987 he was elected as the MLA of 7th Assembly from Rori Vidhan Sabha on Lok Dal ticket. He also served as agriculture minister of Haryana and his father was Chief Minister. In 1990 he was elected as Member of Parliament, Rajya Sabha from Haryana and his father Ch Devi Lal was Deputy Prime Minister of India at that time. He was the Deputy Chairman of State planning board, Haryana in 2005 - 2009. In 2019 he contested Haryana's 14th assembly from Rania Vidhan sabha and won as Independent MLA and became the minister.

== See also ==
- Political families of Haryana
