= Hansi Assembly constituency =

Hansi
- Constituency No. 50 for the Haryana Legislative Assembly

Constituency details
- Country: India
- Region: North India
- State: Haryana
- District: Hisar district
- Total electors: 2,03,799
- Reservation: None

Member of Legislative Assembly
- 15th Haryana Legislative Assembly
- Incumbent Vinod Bhayana
- Party: Bharatiya Janata Party
- Elected year: 2024

29.1°N 75.97°E

Hansi Assembly constituency in Hisar district is one of the 90 Vidhan Sabha constituencies of Haryana state in northern India. It is part of Hisar Lok Sabha constituency.

== Members of the Legislative Assembly ==
Year	Member	Party
1967	Hari Singh Saini	Indian National Congress
1968	Hari Singh Saini	Indian National Congress
1972	Ishar Singh Saini	Independent politician
1977	Baldev Tayal	Janata Party
1982	Amir Chand	Lokdal
1987	Pardeep Chaudhary	Bharatiya Janata Party
1991	Amir Chand	Independent politician
1996	Attar Singh Saini	Haryana Vikas Party
2000	Subhash Chand	Indian National Lok Dal
2005	Amir Chand	Indian National Congress
2009	Vinod Bhayana	Haryana Janhit Congress
2014	Renuka Bishnoi	Haryana Janhit Congress
2019	Vinod Bhayana	Bharatiya Janata Party
2024	Vinod Bhayana	Bharatiya Janata Party

== Election results ==
=== Assembly Election 2024 ===
2024 Haryana Legislative Assembly election: Hansi
Party	Candidate	Votes	%	±%
BJP	Vinod Bhayana	78,686	55.30%	▲13.65
INC	Rahul Makkar	57,226	40.22%	▲37.50
AAP	Rajender Singh	2,333	1.64%	New
BSP	Ravinder Kumar	2,182	1.53%	▼1.12
NOTA	None of the Above	374	0.26%	New
Margin of victory		21,460	15.08%	▼2.35
Turnout		1,42,285	70.02%	▲0.37
Registered electors		2,03,799		▲10.83
BJP hold		Swing	▲13.65	

=== Assembly Election 2019 ===
2019 Haryana Legislative Assembly election: Hansi
Party	Candidate	Votes	%	±%
BJP	Vinod Bhayana	53,191	41.65%	▲23.12
JJP	Rahul Makkar	30,931	24.22%	New
Independent	Prem Singh Malik	21,639	16.94%	New
LSP	Hari Ram	6,726	5.27%	New
INC	Om Prakash	3,468	2.72%	▼14.29
BSP	Surinder Sharma	3,390	2.65%	New
INLD	Kulbir Singh	1,388	1.09%	▼23.13
AAP	Manoj Rathee	1,381	1.08%	New
SUCI(C)	Satyanarayan Bhatol	999	0.78%	New
Independent	Amit Kumar	759	0.59%	New
Margin of victory		22,260	17.43%	▲6.23
Turnout		1,27,702	69.65%	▼7.99
Registered electors		1,83,360		▲8.82
BJP gain from HJC(BL)		Swing	▲6.23	

=== Assembly Election 2014 ===
2014 Haryana Legislative Assembly election: Hansi
Party	Candidate	Votes	%	±%
HJC(BL)	Renuka Bishnoi	46,335	35.42%	▲1.09
INLD	Umed Singh Lohan	31,683	24.22%	▲5.95
BJP	Prof. Chhatter Pal Singh	24,242	18.53%	▲12.74
INC	Vinod Bhayana	22,244	17.01%	▼11.42
Independent	Rao Kuldeep	1,767	1.35%	New
CPI(M)	Ram Avtar Sulchani	1,071	0.82%	New
HLP	Sunil Goyal	725	0.55%	New
Margin of victory		14,652	11.20%	▲5.30
Turnout		1,30,807	77.63%	▲3.55
Registered electors		1,68,495		▲17.32
HJC(BL) hold		Swing	▲1.09	

=== Assembly Election 2009 ===
2009 Haryana Legislative Assembly election: Hansi
Party	Candidate	Votes	%	±%
HJC(BL)	Vinod Bhayana	36,529	34.33%	New
INC	Chattar Pal Singh	30,246	28.43%	▼5.79
INLD	Dhara Singh	19,438	18.27%	▼1.26
BSP	Mange Ram	7,679	7.22%	▲5.58
BJP	Maman Ram	6,165	5.79%	▼1.49
Independent	Ram Kishan	1,809	1.70%	New
Smast Bhartiya Party	Ramesh Chander	1,474	1.39%	New
Independent	Devender Singh	1,015	0.95%	New
Independent	Vinod	552	0.52%	New
Margin of victory		6,283	5.91%	▲1.38
Turnout		1,06,397	74.08%	▼1.81
Registered electors		1,43,621		▲10.77
HJC(BL) gain from INC		Swing	▲0.12	

=== Assembly Election 2005 ===
2005 Haryana Legislative Assembly election: Hansi
Party	Candidate	Votes	%	±%
INC	Amir Chand	33,665	34.21%	▲20.69
Independent	Vinod Bhayana	29,212	29.69%	New
INLD	Satya Bala	19,215	19.53%	▼6.34
BJP	Pardeep Kumar Chaudhary	7,171	7.29%	New
LJP	Pawan Fauji	4,058	4.12%	New
BSP	Jai Narain	1,611	1.64%	▼9.83
Independent	Sube Singh	887	0.90%	New
Independent	Manoj	500	0.51%	New
Margin of victory		4,453	4.53%	▼2.05
Turnout		98,398	75.89%	▲2.69
Registered electors		1,29,661		▲9.43
INC gain from INLD		Swing	▲8.35	

=== Assembly Election 2000 ===
2000 Haryana Legislative Assembly election: Hansi
Party	Candidate	Votes	%	±%
INLD	Subhash Chand	22,435	25.87%	New
Independent	Amir Chand	16,728	19.29%	New
Independent	Pardeep Kumar Chaudhary	12,099	13.95%	New
INC	Vinod Bhayana	11,727	13.52%	▼13.45
HVP	Attar Singh	11,504	13.26%	▼47.18
BSP	Raj Kumar	9,943	11.46%	New
Independent	Amar Nath	1,010	1.16%	New
Independent	Ajay Kumar	513	0.59%	New
Margin of victory		5,707	6.58%	▼26.90
Turnout		86,730	74.11%	▲1.02
Registered electors		1,18,493		▼0.14
INLD gain from HVP		Swing	▼34.57	

=== Assembly Election 1996 ===
1996 Haryana Legislative Assembly election: Hansi
Party	Candidate	Votes	%	±%
HVP	Attar Singh	51,767	60.44%	New
INC	Amir Chand S/O Har Gobind	23,096	26.97%	▲13.13
SAP	Ram Mehar	6,934	8.10%	New
AIIC(T)	Ajit Singh	1,117	1.30%	New
Independent	Suresh Kumar S/O Nand Lal	708	0.83%	New
Margin of victory		28,671	33.48%	▲30.63
Turnout		85,647	73.65%	▲8.95
Registered electors		1,18,664		▲11.28
HVP gain from Independent		Swing	▲31.24	

=== Assembly Election 1991 ===
1991 Haryana Legislative Assembly election: Hansi
Party	Candidate	Votes	%	±%
Independent	Amir Chand	19,689	29.20%	New
Independent	Attar Singh	17,768	26.35%	New
JP	Ram Mehar	11,690	17.34%	New
INC	Narinder Singh	9,330	13.84%	▼12.77
JD	Phool Singh	3,723	5.52%	New
BJP	Bhola Nath	1,316	1.95%	▼67.13
Independent	Jai Bir	1,127	1.67%	New
Independent	Ashok Kumar	424	0.63%	New
Independent	Krishna S/O Richhpal	346	0.51%	New
Margin of victory		1,921	2.85%	▼39.63
Turnout		67,420	66.12%	▼9.81
Registered electors		1,06,637		▲12.40
Independent gain from BJP		Swing	▼39.88	

=== Assembly Election 1987 ===
1987 Haryana Legislative Assembly election: Hansi
Party	Candidate	Votes	%	±%
BJP	Pardeep Kumar Chaudhary	47,867	69.08%	New
INC	Amir Chand	18,436	26.61%	▼4.6
Independent	Hukam Chand	883	1.27%	New
Independent	Dharam Pal	470	0.68%	New
Independent	Suresh	368	0.53%	New
Margin of victory		29,431	42.48%	▲35.57
Turnout		69,290	74.49%	▲5.01
Registered electors		94,872		▲17.50
BJP gain from LKD		Swing	▲30.97	

=== Assembly Election 1982 ===
1982 Haryana Legislative Assembly election: Hansi
Party	Candidate	Votes	%	±%
LKD	Amir Chand	20,934	38.11%	New
INC	Hari Singh	17,141	31.21%	▲27.29
Independent	Jai Narain	9,518	17.33%	New
CPI(M)	Ram Kishan	2,928	5.33%	New
Independent	Pirthvi Singh	1,220	2.22%	New
Independent	Dharam Pal	1,122	2.04%	New
Independent	Piare Lal	507	0.92%	New
Independent	Bani Singh	288	0.52%	New
Margin of victory		3,793	6.91%	▼12.84
Turnout		54,926	69.24%	▼1.50
Registered electors		80,744		▲20.56
LKD gain from JP		Swing	▼10.71	

=== Assembly Election 1977 ===
1977 Haryana Legislative Assembly election: Hansi
Party	Candidate	Votes	%	±%
JP	Baldev Tayal	22,732	48.82%	New
Independent	Amir Chand	13,539	29.08%	New
Independent	Ram Nath	4,131	8.87%	New
VHP	Ajeet Singh	2,854	6.13%	▼13.86
INC	Raj Kumar	1,826	3.92%	▼23.68
Independent	Chatru	535	1.15%	New
Independent	Nunia Mal	294	0.63%	New
Margin of victory		9,193	19.74%	▲10.44
Turnout		46,564	70.25%	▼0.73
Registered electors		66,975		▲16.56
JP gain from Independent		Swing	▲11.91	

=== Assembly Election 1972 ===
1972 Haryana Legislative Assembly election: Hansi
Party	Candidate	Votes	%	±%
Independent	Ishar Singh	14,896	36.90%	New
INC	Hari Singh	11,143	27.61%	▼18.67
VHP	Ajit Singh	8,069	19.99%	▼11.85
RPI	Rikhi Ram	2,972	7.36%	▲2.91
Independent	Tara Chand	1,618	4.01%	New
Independent	Lajpat Rai	1,012	2.51%	New
Independent	Inderjit	367	0.91%	New
SSP	Mani Ram	287	0.71%	New
Margin of victory		3,753	9.30%	▼5.14
Turnout		40,364	71.96%	▲15.29
Registered electors		57,458		▲7.40
Independent gain from INC		Swing	▼9.37	

=== Assembly Election 1968 ===
1968 Haryana Legislative Assembly election: Hansi
Party	Candidate	Votes	%	±%
INC	Hari Singh	13,608	46.28%	▲3.05
VHP	Ajit Singh	9,363	31.84%	New
SWA	Daya Nand	5,127	17.44%	New
RPI	Ram Singh	1,308	4.45%	New
Margin of victory		4,245	14.44%	▼10.98
Turnout		29,406	56.14%	▼17.37
Registered electors		53,500		▲1.79
INC hold		Swing	▲3.05	

=== Assembly Election 1967 ===
1967 Haryana Legislative Assembly election: Hansi
Party	Candidate	Votes	%	±%
INC	Hari Singh	16,435	43.23%	New
Independent	K. Singh	6,771	17.81%	New
SSP	A. Chand	5,179	13.62%	New
Independent	B. Ram	4,601	12.10%	New
ABJS	R. Mal	4,587	12.07%	New
Independent	T. Ram	445	1.17%	New
Margin of victory		9,664	25.42%	
Turnout		38,018	75.73%	
Registered electors		52,559		
INC win (new seat)				

== See also ==
- Haryana Legislative Assembly
- Elections in Haryana
