= Tek Chand Sharma =

Tek Chand Sharma may refer to:

- Tek Chand Sharma (Haryana politician), member of the Haryana Legislative Assembly
- Tek Chand Sharma (Delhi politician), member of the Delhi Legislative Assembly
