= Rohita Rewri =

Indian politician

Member of the Haryana Legislative Assembly
- In office 2014–2019
- Preceded by: Balbir Pal Shah
- Constituency: Panipat City

Personal details
- Born: 2 May 1980 (age 46) Panipat, India
- Party: Bharatiya Janta Party
- Spouse: Surinder Rewari
- Education: DAV School (H.S.)

Rohita Rewri is an Indian politician and she was the member of the Haryana Legislative Assembly from the BJP representing the Panipat City in Haryana.
