= Hisar Lok Sabha constituency =

Parliamentary constituency in Haryana

Coordinates: 29.2°N 75.7°E

Hisar HR-4
- Lok Sabha constituency
- Interactive Map Outlining Hisar Lok Sabha constituency

Constituency details
- Country: India
- Region: North India
- State: Haryana
- Assembly constituencies: Uchana Kalan; Adampur; Uklana; Narnaund; Hansi; Barwala; Hisar; Nalwa Chaudhry; Bawani Khera
- Established: 1952
- Reservation: None

Member of Parliament
- 18th Lok Sabha
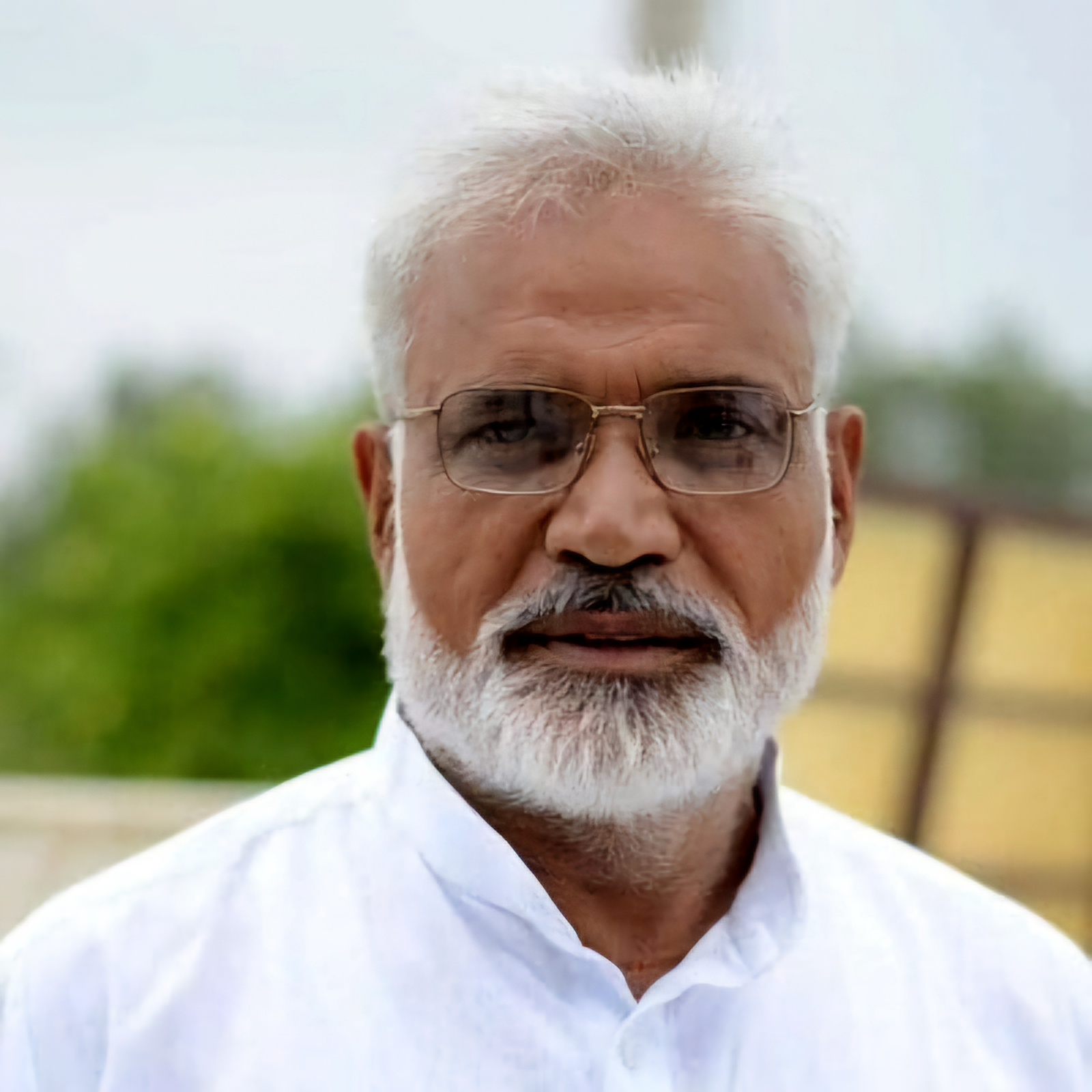
- Incumbent Jai Parkash
- Party: INC
- Alliance: INDIA
- Elected year: 2024

Hisar Lok Sabha constituency (formerly Hissar) is one of the 10 Lok Sabha (parliamentary) constituencies in Haryana state in Northern India. This constituency covers the entire Hisar district and parts of Jind and Bhiwani districts.

== Assembly segments ==
At present, Hisar Lok Sabha constituency comprises nine Vidhan Sabha (legislative assembly) constituencies. These are:

#	Name	District	Member	Party	Leading (in 2024)
37	Uchana Kalan	Jind	Devender Attri	BJP	INC
47	Adampur	Hisar	Chander Prakash Jangra	INC	INC
48	Uklana (SC)	Hisar	Naresh Selwal	INC	INC
49	Narnaund	Hisar	Jassi Petwar	INC	INC
50	Hansi	Hisar	Vinod Bhayana	BJP	BJP
51	Barwala	Hisar	Ranbir Singh Gangwa	BJP	BJP
52	Hisar	Hisar	Savitri Jindal	IND	BJP
53	Nalwa	Hisar	Randhir Panihar	BJP	INC
59	Bawani Khera (SC)	Bhiwani	Kapoor Valmiki	BJP	INC

== Members of Parliament ==
Year	Name	Party
1952	Lala Achint Ram	Indian National Congress
1957	Thakur Das Bhargava	Indian National Congress
1962	Mani Ram Bagri	Samyukta Socialist Party
1967	Ram Krishan Gupta	Indian National Congress
1971	Mani Ram Godara	Indian National Congress
1977	Inder Singh Sheokand	Janata Party
1980	Mani Ram Bagri	Janata Party (Secular)
1984	Birender Singh	Indian National Congress
1989	Jai Parkash	Janata Dal
1991	Narain Singh Kataria	Indian National Congress
1996	Jai Parkash	Haryana Vikas Party
1998	Surender Singh Barwala	Indian National Lok Dal
1999	Surender Singh Barwala	Indian National Lok Dal
2004	Jai Parkash	Indian National Congress
2009	Bhajan Lal Bishnoi	Haryana Janhit Congress
2011^	Kuldeep Bishnoi	Haryana Janhit Congress
2014	Dushyant Chautala	Indian National Lok Dal
2019	Brijendra Singh	Bharatiya Janata Party
2024	Jai Parkash	Indian National Congress

^ by poll

== Election results ==
Vote share of Winning candidates
2024	48.58%
2019	51.13%
2014	42.75%
2011 (By-Poll)	38.84%
2009	29.99%
2004	52.89%
1999	62.03%
1998	35.89%
1996	42.32%
1991	38.37%
1989	50.72%
1984	51.98%
1980	45.76%
1977	80.31%
1971	53.98%
1967	36.09%
1962	44.35%
1957	54.16%
1952	35.18%

=== 2024 ===
2024 Indian general election: Hisar
Party	Candidate	Votes	%	±%
INC	Jai Parkash	570,424	48.58	▲32.97
BJP	Ranjit Singh Chautala	5,07,043	43.19	▼7.93
BSP	Desh Raj	26,015	2.22	▼1.61
INLD	Sunaina Chautala	22,303	1.90	▲1.10
JJP	Naina Singh Chautala	22,032	1.88	▼22.63
NOTA	None of the above	3,366	0.29	▲0.04
Majority		63,381	5.39	▼21.23
Turnout		11,74,115	65.27	▼7.16
INC gain from BJP		Swing		

=== 2019 ===
2019 Indian general elections: Hisar
Party	Candidate	Votes	%	±%
BJP	Brijendra Singh	603,289	51.13	▲51.13
JJP	Dushyant Chautala	2,89,221	24.51	New
INC	Bhavya Bishnoi	1,84,369	15.63	▲6.77
BSP	Surendra Sharma	45,190	3.83	▲1.02
INLD	Suresh Koth	9,761	0.80	▼41.94
NOTA	None of the Above	2,957	0.25	▲0.11
Majority		3,14,068	26.62	▲23.86
Turnout		11,81,878	72.43	▼3.17
BJP gain from INLD		Swing		

=== 2014 ===
2014 Indian general elections: Hisar
Party	Candidate	Votes	%	±%
INLD	Dushyant Chautala	494,478	42.75	▲4.60
HJC(BL)	Kuldeep Bishnoi	4,62,631	39.99	▲1.15
INC	Sampat Singh	1,02,509	8.86	▼7.48
BSP	Mange Ram	30,446	2.63	N/A
AAP	Dr. Yudhbir Singh Khyalia	28,490	2.46	New
NOTA	None of the Above	1,645	0.14	−−−
Majority		31,847	2.76	▲2.06
Turnout		11,55,914	76.17	▲7.36
INLD gain from HJC(BL)		Swing		

=== 2011 By-Election ===
Bye-elections 2011: Hisar
Party	Candidate	Votes	%	±%
HJC(BL)	Kuldeep Bishnoi	355,955	38.84	▲8,85
INLD	Ajay Singh Chautala	3,49,620	38.15	▲9.00
INC	Jai Parkash	1,49,785	16.34	▼8.35
BSMP	O. P. Kalyan	27,802	3.03	N/A
Majority		6,335	0.70	▼0.14
Turnout		9,16,621	68.81	▼0.54
HJC(BL) hold		Swing		

=== 2009 ===
2009 Indian general elections: Hisar
Party	Candidate	Votes	%	±%
HJC(BL)	Bhajan Lal	248,476	29.99	
INLD	Sampat Singh	2,41,493	29.15	
INC	Jai Parkash	2,04,539	24.69	
BSP	Ram Dayal Goyal	90,277	10.90	
Majority		6,983	0.84	
Turnout		8,28,462	69.35	
HJC(BL) gain from INC		Swing		

=== 2004 ===
2004 Indian general election: Hisar
Party	Candidate	Votes	%	±%
INC	Jai Parkash	407,210	52.89	
INLD	Surender Singh Barwala	224,442	29.15	
BJP	Swami Raghvanand	64,722	8.41	
BSP	Sant Ram Prakash	25,060	3.26	
HVP	Kanwal Singh	19,475	2.53	
SP	Ramniwas	2,598	0.34	
IND	10 Independent Candidates	26,344	3.42	
Majority		182,768	23.74	
Turnout				
Swing to INC from INLD		Swing		

=== 1999 ===
1999 Indian general election: Hisar
Party	Candidate	Votes	%	±%
INLD	Surender Singh Barwala	396,540	62.03	
INC	Birender Singh	236,088	36.93	
IND	5 Independent Candidates	4,470	0.70	
OTH	1 Other Party Candidate	2,204	0.34	
Majority		160,452	25.10	
Turnout		646,513	63.05	
INLD hold		Swing		

=== 1998 ===
1998 Indian general election: Hisar
Party	Candidate	Votes	%	±%
INLD	Surender Singh Barwala	260,271	35.89	
HVP	Om Parkash Jindal	179,780	24.79	
SJP(R)	Jai Parkash	171,129	23.60	
INC	Ranjit Singh	73,251	10.10	
CPI(M)	Phool Singh Sheokand	25,366	3.50	
IND	6 Independent Candidates	9,595	1.33	
OTH	3 Other Party Candidates	5,730	0.79	
Majority		80,491	11.10	
Turnout		733,865	71.50	
Swing to INLD from HVP		Swing		

=== 1996 ===
1996 Indian general election: Hisar
Party	Candidate	Votes	%	±%
HVP	Jai Parkash S/O Harikesh	306,402	42.32	
SAP	Gauri Shanker	131,750	18.20	
INC	Surjeet Singh	107,953	14.91	
IND	Phool Singh Sheokand	56,307	7.78	
BSP	Sukh Dev	36,308	5.01	
AIIC(T)	Vijay Kumar	28,239	3.90	
IND	27 Independent Candidates	54,069	7.47	
OTH	2 Other Party Candidates	2,971	0.41	
Majority		174,652	24.12	
Turnout		746,249	72.42	
Swing to HVP from INC		Swing		

=== 1991 ===
1991 Indian general election: Hisar
Party	Candidate	Votes	%	±%
INC	Narain Singh	233,012	38.37	
JP	Jai Parkash	206,818	34.06	
JD	Parma Nand	85,241	14.04	
BJP	Siri Niwas Goel	35,486	5.84	
DDP	Mahender	1,303	0.21	
IND	12 Independent Candidates	45,380	7.47	
Majority		26,194	4.31	
Turnout		627,037	68.20	
Swing to INC from JD		Swing		

=== 1989 ===
1989 Indian general election: Hisar
Party	Candidate	Votes	%	±%
JD	Jai Parkash	291,073	50.72	
INC	Virender Singh	246,394	42.94	
IND	28 Independent Candidates	32,474	5.65	
OTH	2 Other Party Candidates	3,904	0.68	
Majority		44,679	7.78	
Turnout		583,150	63.87	
Swing to JD from INC		Swing		

=== 1984 ===
1984 Indian general election: Hisar
Party	Candidate	Votes	%	±%
INC	Birinder Singh	251,367	51.98	
LKD	Om Parkash	200,161	41.39	
JP	Balwant Rai Tayal	11,217	2.32	
IND	14 Independent Candidates	20,812	4.31	
Majority		51,206	10.59	
Turnout		491,750	66.68	
Swing to INC from JP(S)		Swing		

=== 1980 ===
1980 Indian general election: Hisar
Party	Candidate	Votes	%	±%
JP(S)	Mani Ram S/O Harji Ram	192,074	45.76	
INC(I)	Mani Ram S/O Ramjas	99,363	23.67	
JP	Inder Singh	93,228	22.21	
IND	Parma Nand S/O Moti Ram	13,857	3.30	
IND	Hawa Singh	5,053	1.20	
IND	10 Independent Candidates	16,130	3.84	
Majority		92,711	22.09	
Turnout		428,928	65.07	
Swing to JP(S) from JP		Swing		

=== 1977 ===
1977 Indian general election: Hisar
Party	Candidate	Votes	%	±%
JP	Inder Singh	322,456	80.31	
INC	Jaswant Singh	79,072	19.69	
Majority		243,384	60.62	
Turnout		409,400	73.93	
Swing to JP from INC		Swing		

=== 1971 ===
1971 Indian general election: Hisar
Party	Candidate	Votes	%	±%
INC	Mani Ram Godara	170,204	53.98	
SSP	Mani Ram Bagri	86,510	27.44	
INC(O)	Ram Kishan	43,948	13.94	
IND	Sheo Bux Jangra	6,056	1.92	
IND	Mandal Singh	2,646	0.84	
IND	Bakhtawar Singh	2,398	0.76	
IND	Chhote Ram	2,113	0.67	
RPI(K)	Ram Singh Bedharak	1,436	0.46	
Majority		83,694	26.54	
Turnout		321,994	62.56	
INC hold		Swing		

=== 1967 ===
1967 Indian general election: Hisar
Party	Candidate	Votes	%	±%
INC	R. Kishan	115,963	36.09	
SSP	M. Ram	108,784	33.86	
ABJS	Y. Singh	54,635	17.01	
IND	K. Ram	16,025	4.99	
IND	M. Lal	11,076	3.45	
IND	R. Singh	7,477	2.33	
IND	R. Chander	7,320	2.28	
Majority		7,179	2.23	
Turnout		335,463	70.87	
Swing to INC from Socialist		Swing		

=== 1962 ===
1962 Indian general election: Hisar
Party	Candidate	Votes	%	±%
Socialist	Mani Ram	152,369	44.35	
INC	Ghamandi Lal	125,136	36.42	
ABJS	Rattan Singh	24,397	7.10	
IND	Dwarka Prashad	16,964	4.94	
IND	Bhagu	14,152	4.12	
IND	Balkar Singh	10,533	3.07	
Majority		27,233	7.93	
Turnout		356,615	62.80	
Swing to Socialist from INC		Swing		

=== 1957 ===
1957 Indian general election: Hisar
Party	Candidate	Votes	%	±%
INC	Thakar Dass Bhargava	127,059	54.16	
IND	Net Ram	41,815	17.82	
IND	Nanak Chand	37,968	16.18	
PSP	Ram Swarup	20,818	8.87	
IND	Sham Lal	6,939	2.96	
Majority		85,244	36.34	
Turnout		234,599	55.96	
INC hold		Swing		

=== 1952 ===
1952 Indian general election: Hisar
Party	Candidate	Votes	%	±%
INC	Lala Achint Ram	66,266	35.18	
IND	Hardev Sahai	36,295	19.27	
ZP (Note: Zamindar Party)	Man Singh	30,596	16.24	
CPI	Udebir Singh	14,116	7.49	
RRP	Chitra Devi	12,948	6.87	
ABJS	Sham Lal	12,453	6.61	
IND	Hardwari Lal	8,002	4.25	
IND	Amokal Singh	7,713	4.09	
Majority		29,971	15.91	
Turnout		188,389	50.82	
INC win (new seat)				

== See also ==
- Hisar (city)
- Hisar Urban Agglomeration
- Hisar district
- Hisar division
- Hisar (Vidhan Sabha constituency)
- Asigarh Fort at Hansi
- Kanwari Indus Valley Mound at Kanwari
- Tosham rock inscription at Tosham
- List of Indus Valley Civilization sites
- List of Monuments of National Importance in Haryana
- List of State Protected Monuments in Haryana
- List of National Parks & Wildlife Sanctuaries of Haryana, India
- Haryana Tourism
