= Chander Parkash =

Indian politician and retired IAS officer

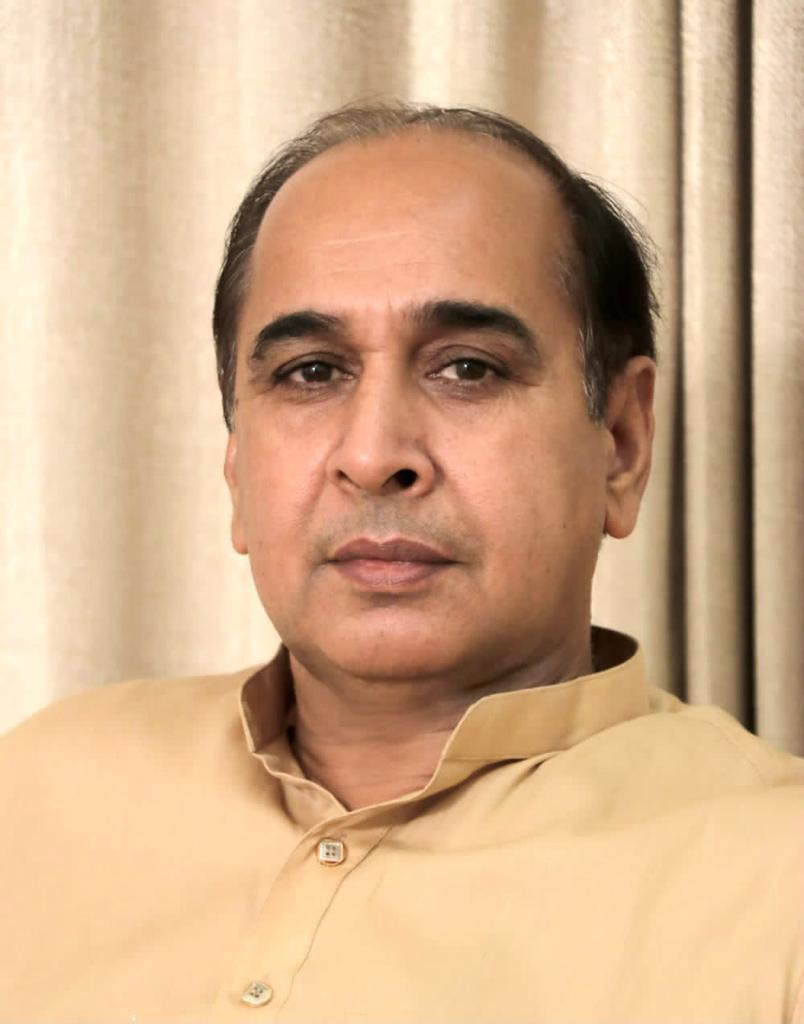

Member of Haryana Legislative Assembly
- Incumbent
- Assumed office 8 October 2024
- Preceded by: Bhavya Bishnoi
- Constituency: Adampur

State Chairman, OBC Department
- Incumbent
- Assumed office 19 May 2026 Serving with Haryana Pradesh Congress Committee (AICC)

Personal details
- Born: 20 October 1957 (age 68) Village Aryanagar, Hisar, Haryana, India
- Party: Indian National Congress
- Spouse: Smt. Aarti Devi
- Children: Two sons and one daughter
- Parent: Late Sh. Arjun Lal (father)
- Education: Dayanand College, Hisar (BCom); Kurukshetra University (LLB)
- Occupation: Retired IAS officer, Advocate
- Profession: Politician
- Website: chanderparkash.org

Chander Parkash (born 20 October 1957) is an Indian politician and retired Indian Administrative Service (IAS) officer from Haryana. He is a Member of the Haryana Legislative Assembly from 2024, representing the Adampur Assembly Constituency as a member of the Indian National Congress party.

== Early life and family background ==
Chander Parkash was born on 20 October 1957 in Village Aryanagar, Tehsil and District Hisar, Haryana, into a respectable joint family of the Khati/Jangra caste — a leading community within the Vishwakarma tradition — involved in small-scale farming and wooden handicraft (carpentry). He is the son of Late Sh. Arjun Lal. He is married to Smt. Aarti Devi and has two sons and one daughter.

He belongs to a well-known political joint family. His uncle, Late Shri Ramji Lal Ji, held several prominent positions including Member of the All India Congress Committee; Member of Rajya Sabha (twice); President, District Congress Committee, Hisar (Rural); President, Confed Haryana; Member, Haryana State Electricity Board; Chairman, Haryana State Co-operative Bank; Chairman, Block Development Committee, Hisar-2; Sarpanch, Gram Panchayat Aryanagar; and lifelong Patron of Gurukul Aryanagar and Arya Samaj Arya Nagar, District Hisar. Another uncle, Late Shri Ram Swaroop Ji, served as Member, Block Development Committee, Hisar-2 and Sarpanch, Gram Panchayat Aryanagar. His aunt (Chachi Ji), Mrs. Gayatri Devi, served as Sarpanch, Gram Panchayat Aryanagar, and his elder brother, Shri Om Parkash, served as Zila Parshad, Zila Parishad, Hisar.

He was honored with the title of Jangid Ratna by the Akhil Bhartiya Jangid-Brahman Mahasabha (Haryana) for his multifaceted talent and social contributions.

== Education ==
Chander Parkash completed his B.Com and LLB from Dayanand College, Hisar and Kurukshetra University, Kurukshetra respectively. During his studies at Kurukshetra University, he was active in student politics and served as Vice President of the Kurukshetra University unit of the NSUI from 1978 to 1981.

== Administrative career ==
After enrolling with the District Bar Association, Hisar in 1981, Chander Parkash provided legal aid to economically and socially backward people for two years. He was subsequently selected to the Haryana Civil Service (HCS) in 1983 and was promoted to the Indian Administrative Service in the 1995 batch.

As an HCS and IAS officer, he served in numerous senior capacities:

- Sub-Divisional Magistrate: Panipat and Panchkula
- City Magistrate: Karnal, Ambala and Jhajjar
- Deputy Commissioner: Mewat, Rewari, Karnal, Mahendergarh and Jhajjar
- Administrator: HSVP, Rohtak and Hisar
- Divisional Commissioner: Gurugram, Rohtak, Karnal and Ambala
- Director General: State Transport Department (Haryana Roadways)
- State Transport Commissioner and Commissioner & Secretary to Govt. of Haryana: Transport Department
- Head of the Department and Commissioner & Secretary to Govt. of Haryana: Department of Industries and Commerce; Revenue and Disaster Management; HAFED; Scheduled Caste and Backward Classes Welfare Corporation; and Women Welfare Corporation
- State Information Commissioner: Appointed in 2017 (a post equivalent to Chief Secretary rank) in recognition of his administrative experience, efficiency and honesty. He completed approximately five years' tenure in this position with distinction.

He was awarded twice by the Indian Red Cross Society, Haryana state, for valuable services rendered to the cause of Red Cross in Haryana.

=== Training and international exposure ===
- 2-month Induction Training Programme for IAS Officers at Lal Bahadur Shastri National Academy of Administration, Mussoorie (2001)
- Two-week programme on Infrastructure Planning and Management at IIM Bangalore (2004)
- Two-week short-term training programme on Public Administration in the USA (2006)
- Eight-week Phase-IV Mid Career Training programme on Public Administration at LBSNAA Mussoorie, including a two-week study visit of South Korea (2008)
- One-week study tour to Sikkim as Member of the Haryana Vidhan Sabha Committee on Welfare of SC/ST & BC (June 2025)
- National Conference of Chairpersons of Committees on the Welfare of SC, ST of Parliament & State/UT Legislators, Bhubaneswar, Odisha (29–30 August 2025)

== Political career ==
=== Congress party roles ===
Chander Parkash has held several organisational positions within the Indian National Congress:

- Member, State Level Programme Fixation Committee, Haryana Pradesh Congress Committee
- Member Secretary, Election Manifesto Committee, Haryana Pradesh Congress Committee
- President, Dastkaar-Shilpkaar Cell, Haryana Pradesh Congress Committee
- State Chairman, OBC Department, Haryana Pradesh Congress Committee (AICC) — appointed on 19 May 2026.

=== Political activities ===
He actively participated in both phases of the Bharat Jodo Yatra led by Shri Rahul Gandhi and engaged in meaningful discussions regarding the upliftment of backward classes and scheduled castes. He also worked to spread the ideology of the Congress Party across Haryana through programmes such as Haath Se Haath Jodo, Vipaksh Aapke Samaksh, Jan Milan Samaroh and Ghar-Ghar Congress Har-Ghar Congress.

As a star campaigner for the Haryana Pradesh Congress during the 2024 Lok Sabha General Elections, he campaigned across constituencies including Rohtak, Sonipat, Gurugram, Bhiwani-Mahendergarh, Hisar and Sirsa, with particular focus on connecting Extremely Backward Classes and the Vishwakarma community with the Congress Party. During the 2022 Adampur Assembly by-election, he played an important role in securing more than 53,000 votes for the party.

He successfully organised state-level Nyay Chaupals for Dastkaar, Shilpkaar and Backward Classes in various cities of Haryana.

=== 2024 Haryana Legislative Assembly election ===
Chander Parkash contested the 2024 Haryana Legislative Assembly election from the Adampur Assembly Constituency representing the Indian National Congress. He defeated his nearest rival Bhavya Bishnoi of the Bharatiya Janata Party — grandson of former Chief Minister Bhajan Lal — by a margin of 1,268 votes, ending the Bhajan Lal family's dominance over the constituency after 56 years.

=== Legislative work as MLA ===
In a short time as MLA, Chander Parkash has raised several issues strongly in the Haryana Legislative Assembly:

- Pushing for development works in the Adampur constituency that had remained stalled for years
- Highlighting the problems of farmers, labourers, employees, small and medium shopkeepers, unemployed youth, women, Dalits and backward classes
- Advocating for basic facilities and social and economic upliftment of Scheduled Castes, Backward Classes and weaker sections
- Protecting the interests of reserved categories and working to increase reservation limits for Backward Classes A & B in government jobs as well as in Panchayati Raj Institutions and Urban Local Body elections to 16% and 11% respectively

The Speaker of the Legislative Assembly nominated him as a member of the Estimate Committee, Petition Committee, House Allotment Committee and SC-BC Welfare Committee in view of his experience and working style.

== Personal ==
Chander Parkash is vegetarian and lists reading books and listening to music among his hobbies. He plays badminton and volleyball. He has visited the United States of America, South Korea, Japan and the United Kingdom.

His languages are Hindi and English. His present profession is listed as agriculture and social services.

Permanent address: Village and Post Office Arya Nagar, Tehsil and District Hisar, Pin-125001.
Correspondence address: H.No. 217, Vishwakarma Colony, Balsamand Road, Hisar (Haryana), Pin-125001.

== See also ==
- 2024 Haryana Legislative Assembly election
- Haryana Legislative Assembly
- Adampur, Haryana Assembly constituency
- Indian National Congress
