= Nayan Pal Rawat =

Indian politician

Nayan Pal Singh Rawat is an Indian politician. He was elected to the Haryana Legislative Assembly from Prithla in the 2019 Haryana Legislative Assembly election as a member and Independent candidate. Previously, he was associated with Bharatiya Janata Party. He is from village Asaoti (Palwal).
