= Jai Parkash =

Haryana politician

Jai Parkash Saharan
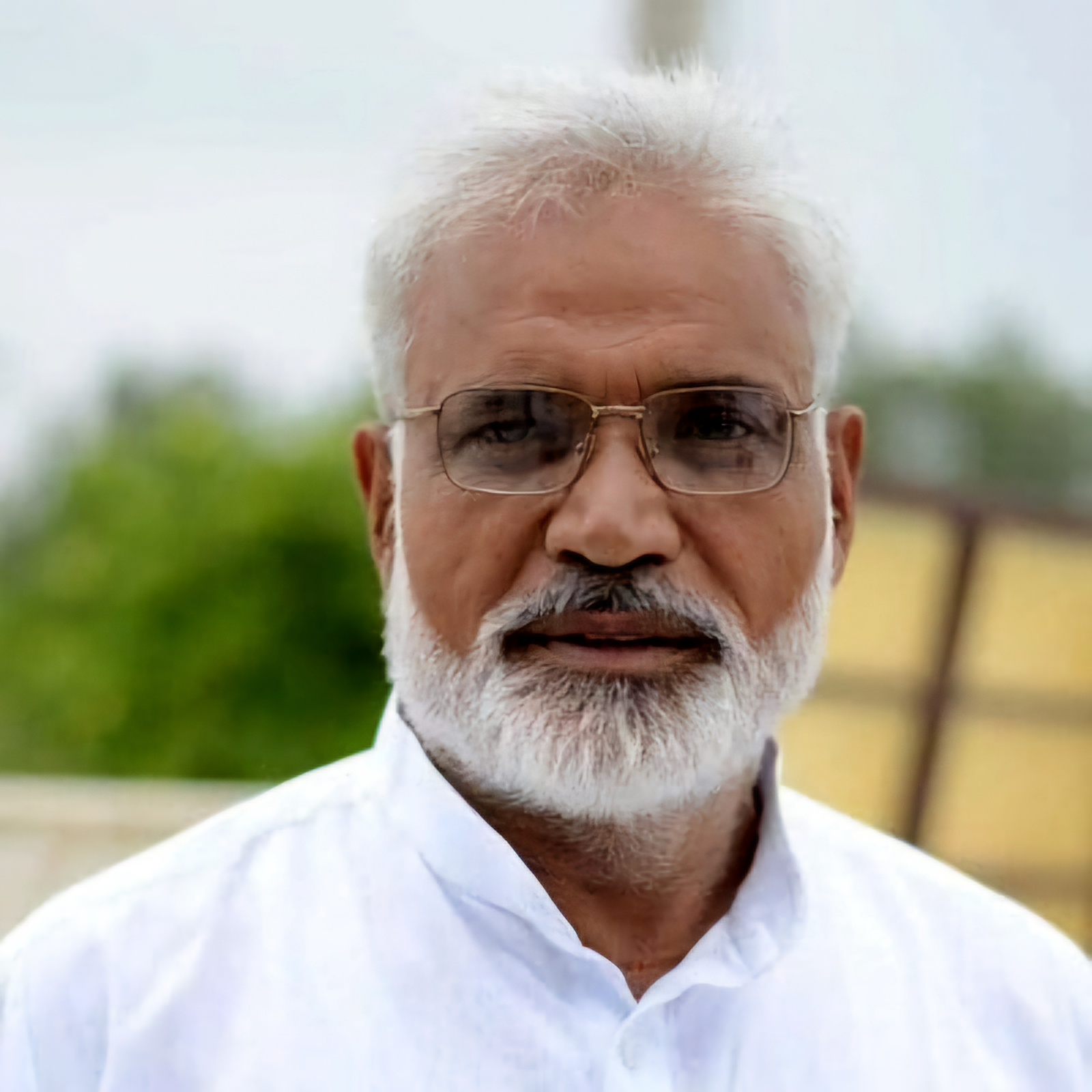
- JP

Member of Parliament, Lok Sabha
- Incumbent
- Assumed office 4 June 2024
- Preceded by: Brijendra Singh
- Constituency: Hisar
- In office 13 May 2004 — 16 May 2009
- Preceded by: Surender Singh Barwala
- Succeeded by: Bhajan Lal
- Constituency: Hisar
- In office 9 May 1996 — 5 March 1998
- Preceded by: Narain Singh
- Succeeded by: Surender Singh Barwala
- Constituency: Hisar
- In office 1 December 1989 — 21 June 1991
- Preceded by: Ch. Birender Singh
- Succeeded by: Narain Singh
- Constituency: Hisar

Member of the Haryana Legislative Assembly
- In office 19 October 2014 — 24 October 2019
- Preceded by: Rampal Majra
- Succeeded by: Kamlesh Dhanda
- Constituency: Kalayat

Personal details
- Born: 2 December 1954 (age 71) Kaithal, Punjab, India
- Party: Indian National Congress
- Spouse: Savitri Devi Saharan
- Children: 1 son and 1 daughter
- As of 31 August, 2017

Jai Parkash Saharan (born 2 December 1954) is an Indian politician and currently serving as Member of Parliament of Lok Sabha representing Hisar and is a member of the Indian National Congress. He served as Deputy Minister in Ministry of Petroleum and Chemicals in Chandra Shekhar ministry. He was member of 9th, 11th, 14th Lok Sabha.
