= Surender Singh Barwala =

Indian politician

Surender Singh Barwala (born 2 August 1951) has been elected the Member of Parliament from Hisar constituency in 12th and 13th Lok Sabha, the lower house of Indian Parliament.

He was born in village Sangatpura, Jind district in Haryana, he did his B.A. from Dyal Singh College, Karnal, followed by L. L. B. from Kurukshetra Law College, Kurukshetra University.

He has defeated heavy weights and business tycoon from Haryana Om Prakash Jindal of Jindal Steel Industries and Congress Stalwarts like Brinder Singh, Jaiprakash. He has also been elected to Vidhan Sabha from Barwala in 1987 and was made the Forest Minister and later Education Minister. He was in Indian National Lok Dal a regional outfit. He is now in Bhartiya Janta Party and contested for MLA from Jind Stood second by a narrow margin of 2,000 votes. He joined the party in presence of BJP President Amit Shah and Health Minister Govt. Of India Shri J.P.Nadda on 12 September 2014. After losing the 2014 Haryana Assembly Election and failing to get a ticket from the BJP in the 2019 & 2024 Haryana Assembly Elections, he joined Congress in September 2024 hoping for a better future, but BJP was once again elected to form the Government for a 3rd consecutive term.
