= Vinod Bhayana =

Indian politician

Vinod Bhayana is an Indian politician of Bharatiya Janata Party and MLA in 2024 Haryana Legislative Assembly from the Hansi Assembly constituency in the Hisar District in Harayana state of India.

== Political career ==
Bhayana started his political career in Lohari Ragho, where he was elected Sarpanch five times. His father, Bhai Mahesh Chandar Bhayana, was also Sarpanch there. Vinod Bhayana was elected as MLA from Hansi in 2009, and reelected in 2019 Haryana Legislative Assembly and 2024. In his first term, Bhayana served as Chief Parliamentary Secretary in the Haryana Government under Jails, Order and Law, and Electricity portfolios.

== Family ==
In 1984, Bhayana married Sunita Bhayana. The couple have two sons and one daughter: Anshul Bhayana, Sahil Bhayana and Supriya Nagpal. They live in Hansi.

== See also ==
- Politics of Haryana
