= Kuldeep Bishnoi =

Indian politician (born 1968)

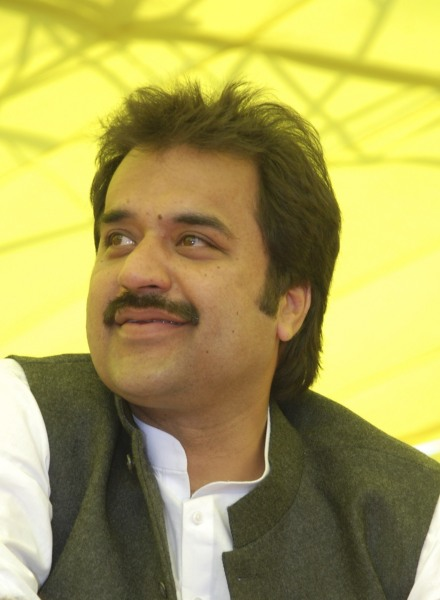

Member of Legislative Assembly of Haryana
- In office 19 October 2014 – 3 August 2022
- Preceded by: Renuka Bishnoi
- Succeeded by: Bhavya Bishnoi
- Constituency: Adampur

Member of Parliament, Lok Sabha
- In office 20 September 2011 — 16 May 2014
- Preceded by: Bhajan Lal
- Succeeded by: Dushyant Chautala
- Constituency: Hisar
- In office 17 May 2004 — 18 May 2009
- Preceded by: Ajay Singh Chautala
- Succeeded by: Constituency Abolished
- Constituency: Bhiwani

Personal details
- Born: 22 September 1968 (age 58) Hisar, Haryana, India
- Citizenship: Indian
- Party: Bharatiya Janata Party (2022–present)
- Other political affiliations: Indian National Congress (Earlier HJC (BL) which merged in 2016) (until 2022)
- Spouse: Renuka Bishnoi
- Children: Bhavya Bishnoi; Chaitanya Bishnoi; Sia Bishnoi
- Parent(s): Bhajan Lal, Jasma Devi

Kuldeep Bishnoi (born 22 September 1968) is an Indian politician and a member of Bharatiya Janata Party. He served as fourth-time member of Haryana Legislative Assembly from Adampur in the Hisar (city) of Haryana. He was also a member of Congress Central Working Committee (CWC). Earlier in 2007, Bishnoi had founded a new party, Haryana Janhit Congress, a breakaway faction of Indian National Congress.

== Personal life ==
Born to Smt. Jasma Devi and Ch. Bhajan Lal - Union Cabinet Minister (Agriculture; Environment & Forests) and three-time Chief Minister of Haryana - he graduated with a BA in Public Administration from Punjab University in Chandigarh.

He is married to Renuka Bishnoi, who was a Member of Legislative Assembly from Hansi (Hisar district) in Haryana. He has three children - two sons and a daughter. His elder son, Bhavya Bishnoi, is an aspiring political leader, and younger son, Chaitanya Bishnoi, is a professional cricketer with Chennai Super Kings in the IPL and Haryana in the Ranji Trophy. His daughter, Sia Bishnoi, is pursuing studies in New York, USA.

== Political career ==
Kuldeep Bishnoi first became MLA in 1998 from Adampur, a seat from which the family has never lost since 1968 till now. In 2004, he defeated the sons of Om Prakash Chautala (serving Chief Minister of Haryana at the time) and Bansi Lal (former Chief Minister of Haryana) - from Bhiwani in the Lok Sabha elections.

Kuldeep Bishnoi founded Haryana Janhit Congress - jatin (HJC (BL)) in 2007 along with his father Ch. Bhajan Lal. He founded the party after he was ousted from the Indian National Congress as he had criticised the then Haryana Chief Minister, Bhupinder Singh Hooda, for harming the interests of farmers by promoting special economic zones (SEZs) on fertile land.

In October 2009, the party fielded candidates in 89 of the 90 constituencies for the state assembly elections and won seven of those seats, he himself winning from Adampur as an MLA and his father becoming MP from Hisar Lok Sabha constituency.

Six of the seven elected representatives defected and transferred their support to Indian National Congress in lieu of ministerial portfolios. He filed a case against the defectors in the court of law and won. The Punjab and Haryana High Court disqualified them as members of the Haryana Legislative Assembly.

In March 2010, he and his party workers were lathi charged by the Chandigarh Police for peacefully protesting against rising inflation and unemployment, and unfair government policies for the farmers.

In 2011, following the death of his father, HJC and BJP formed an alliance. The alliance was announced at a joint press conference addressed by BJP president Nitin Gadkari, party leader Sushma Swaraj, former Minister Prof. Ganeshi Lal, HJC co-founder Kuldeep Bishnoi. He won the Lok Sabha by-election, defeating Ajay Singh Chautala of the Indian National Lok Dal (INLD) and Jai Prakash of the governing Indian National Congress, among others. Prakash and 38 other candidates forfeited their deposits. The elections gained attention due to their simultaneous occurrence with the Indian anti-corruption movement of 2011. In 2014, prior to the assembly elections, HJC-BJP alliance was broken off, the HJC claiming that BJP had failed to keep the alliance conditions.

In 2016, after his meeting with the Congress vice-president Rahul Gandhi, Kuldeep Bishnoi merged HJC (BL) with the Indian National Congress. He is presently a Special Invitee to the Congress Working Committee (CWC) and was a campaigner for the Rajasthan Assembly elections in 2018.

In 2019 assembly election he was elected from Adampur constituency defeating rival candidate by nearly a margin of 29782 votes.

On 4 August 2022 he joined Bharatiya Janata party in party headquarters.

== Controversy ==
In June 2022, Bishnoi was blamed for the loss of Congress Rajya Sabha nominee Ajay Maken in Haryana, when he allegedly cross-voted in favour of JJP-backed and BJP-supported Independent candidate, Kartikeya. He was removed from all party posts from Congress. On 3 August 2022, he resigned from the Legislative Assembly and joined the Bharatiya Janata Party.

== See also ==
- Aaya Ram Gaya Ram
- Dynastic politics of Haryana
