= Ramchand Kamboj =

Indian politician

Ramchand Kamboj is a member of the Haryana Legislative Assembly from the BJP representing the Rania Vidhan sabha Constituency in Haryana from 2014 to 2019. He joined Bharatiya Janata Party just before 2019 Haryana Legislative Assembly election.
