= Bhajan Lal =

6th Chief Minister of Haryana

- Bhajan Lal in 1989

6th Chief Minister of Haryana
- In office 23 June 1991 – 11 May 1996
- Preceded by: Om Prakash Chautala
- Succeeded by: Bansi Lal
- In office 29 June 1979 – 5 July 1986
- Preceded by: Chaudhary Devi Lal
- Succeeded by: Bansi Lal
Parliamentary and Legislative Tenures
Member of Parliament, Rajya Sabha
In office 2 Aug 1986 – 27 Nov 1989
Constituency	Haryana
Member of Parliament, Lok Sabha
In office 16 May 2009 – 3 June 2011
Preceded by	Jai Parkash
Succeeded by	Kuldeep Bishnoi
Constituency	Hisar
In office 10 March 1998 – 26 April 1999
Preceded by	Ishwar Dayal Swami
Succeeded by	Ishwar Dayal Swami
Constituency	Karnal
In office 2 December 1989 – 13 March 1991
Preceded by	Khurshid Ahmed
Succeeded by	Avtar Singh Bhadana
Constituency	Faridabad
Member of the Haryana Legislative Assembly
In office 22 May 2008 – 16 May 2009
Preceded by	Seat vacant
Succeeded by	Kuldeep Bishnoi
Constituency	Adampur
In office 22 February 2000 – 25 March 2008
Preceded by	Kuldeep Bishnoi
Succeeded by	Seat vacant
Constituency	Adampur
In office 10 May 1996 – March 1998
Preceded by	Himself
Succeeded by	Kuldeep Bishnoi
Constituency	Adampur
In office 23 June 1991 – 11 May 1996
Preceded by	Jasma Devi
Succeeded by	Himself
Constituency	Adampur
In office 12 May 1968 – 2 August 1986
Preceded by	Hari Singh
Succeeded by	Jasma Devi
Constituency	Adampur

Personal details
- Born: 6 October 1930 Kotwali, Bahawalpur State, British India (modern-day Punjab, Pakistan)
- Died: 3 June 2011 (aged 80) Hisar, Haryana, India
- Party: Haryana Janhit Congress (BL) (2007-2011)
- Other political affiliations: Indian National Congress (1968–1977), (1979-2007); Janata Party (1977-1979)
- Spouse: Jasma Devi
- Children: 3, including Chander Mohan, Kuldeep Bishnoi, Roshni Bishnoi
- Parent(s): Kheraj Manjhu (father), Kundana Devi (mother)

Bhajan Lal Bishnoi (6 October 1930 – 3 June 2011) was a politician and three-time chief minister of the Indian state of Haryana. He became the Chief Minister for the first time in 1979, was re-elected in 1982, and became the chief minister for the third time by winning the elections in 1991. He also served as the Minister of Agriculture and the Minister of Environment and Forests in the Rajiv Gandhi government.

== Early life ==
Bhajan Lal was born in a Bishnoi family on 6 October 1930 in the Koranwali village of British India's Bahawalpur princely state in modern-day Pakistan. He received his formal education in Bahawalnagar. Lal lived under difficult circumstances and had to sell his wares on a cycle to make a living. He married Jasma Devi, with whom he had two sons - Chander Mohan Bishnoi and Kuldip Bishnoi and a daughter, Roshni.

Bhajan Lal moved to Adampur after the Partition. At the age of 17 he began buying and selling goods at his village market, he soon started a shop in partnership with Pokhar Mal who was a local trader. Both of them worked as commission agents (intermediaries between the farmer and the wholesaler), this work got him into trouble with the local police. He initially joined politics to protect himself from the police. The police had 12 criminal cases and charges against him, all of which were dropped once he became a MLA.

== Political career ==
Lal started his political career by becoming a village sarpanch and later the chairman of the panchayat samiti of Hisar. He joined the Congress Party, and became the president of the Congress Mandal in the region. He was elected to the Haryana Assembly for the first time in 1968 after winning the mid-term polls in Adampur. He retained this seat for the remainder of his political career except in 1987 when his wife won the seat.

=== Janata Party ===
In 1977 elections he contested under a Janata Party ticket and won the elections. Under the new Janata Party government of Devi Lal, Bhajan Lal was given a number of ministries including the ministry of dairy development and animal husbandry, the ministry of labour and employment, and the forests ministry. However in 1979 he defected to the Congress along with a group of MLAs thereby toppling the Janata Party government.

=== First and Second Terms as Chief Minister ===
Following his defection to the Congress he became the Chief Minister of Haryana with a razor thin majority. In 1980 following the victory of Indira Gandhi led Congress (I) in the general elections, many Janata Party leaders began to defect, by then he was able to get as many as 40 Janata Party MLAs into the Congress and secured a strong majority of 50 MLAs in an assembly of 90 MLAs. He had achieved this despite his rival Devi Lal resorting to guarding his 42 Janata Party MLAs in a farmhouse with guards armed with submachine guns. He offered the defecting MLAs land, money, positions in state corporations and boards, and cabinet positions to this end he had expanded the number of cabinet ministries to 26 which made every second congress MLA a minister. He also held control over the state's Criminal Investigation Department, which he used to his advantage by filing cases against he rivals to pressure them into withdrawing or joining him. This horse trading during his first term had led to the Hindustan Times calling him the "master of horse-trading".

Bhajan Lal's record on governance and the economy however was seen as poor at the time with state corporations and boards seeing sharp declines in their surpluses and no addition of new electricity generation capacity in the state during his initial years of rule between 1979-1982. He was re-elected on 23 May 1982 and served until July 1986.

==== 1987 Elections ====
Although he did not lead the party into the 1987 elections, the electoral rout of the Congress in that elections resulted in him being slowly sidelined in the party in favour of newer leaders like Bhupinder Hooda.

=== Union Minister and National Politics ===
In 1986 following the end of his tenure as Chief Minister, he was made a Rajya Sabha MP, and was appointed as the Union Minister of Environment and Forests under the Rajiv Gandhi government. In 1988 he was made the Union Minister of Agriculture. In 1989 he was elected to the Lok Sabha after winning in the constituency of Faridabad by defeating Khurshid Ahmed from the Janata Party.

=== Third Term as Chief Minister ===
He resigned from the Lok Sabha and contested the Haryana Assembly elections held in 1991 from Adampur, Congress won the elections and he was made the chief minister for the third time. However, in the 1996 elections the Congress suffered a major defeat, and Bhajan Lal never became a chief minister following that.

=== Leaving the Congress ===
The victory of the Indian National Congress in Haryana's 2005 elections caused a major rift in its state unit, as it opted to make Bhupinder Hooda, a Jat, the Chief Minister instead of Lal. In 2007, Lal officially announced he would form a new party, called the Haryana Janhit Congress. The key event that brought this about was the suspension of his son Kuldeep Bishnoi from the Indian National Congress, for criticizing the party's central leaders.

=== 2009 Lok Sabha Elections ===
He fought the 2009 Lok Sabha election despite being 79 years old at the time, stating that he was still "young enough to win elections". He fought from Hissar and defeated Sampat Singh, INLD leader by 6983 votes, Jai parkash of Congress came at third position in a high-profile battle.

== Death ==
Bhajan Lal died on 3 June 2011 in Hisar following a heart attack.

== See also ==
- Aaya Ram Gaya Ram
- Dynastic politics of Haryana

Political offices
Preceded by Chaudhary Devi Lal	Chief Minister of Haryana; 1979–1985	Succeeded by Chaudhary Bansi Lal
Preceded by Om Prakash Chautala	Chief Minister of Haryana; 1991–1996	Succeeded by Chaudhary Bansi Lal
