= Tek Chand Sharma (Haryana politician) =

Indian politician

Tekchand Sharma was a member of the Haryana Legislative Assembly from the Bahujan Samaj Party representing the Prithla constituency in Faridabad district of Haryana.
