= Haryana Janhit Congress (BL) =

- Founded: 2 December 2007 (18 years ago)
- Dissolved: 28 April 2016 (10 years ago)
- Split from: Indian National Congress
- Merged into: Indian National Congress
- Headquarters: New Delhi
- ECI status: State Party

Election symbol
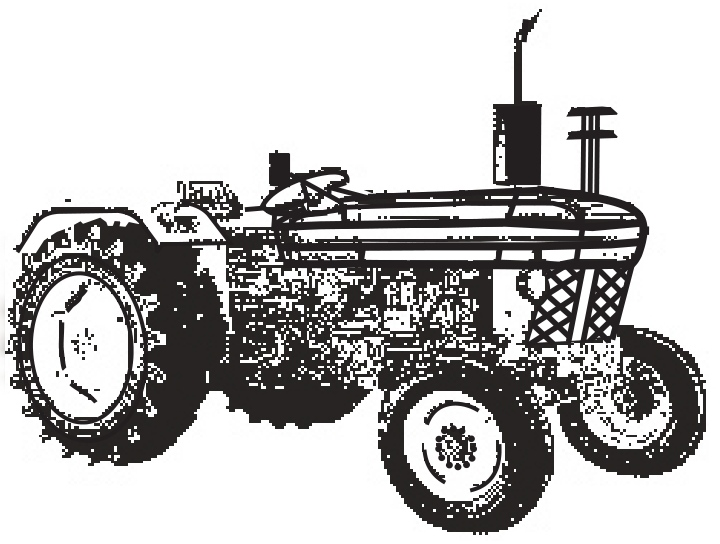

Haryana Janhit Congress was a state political party in the state of Haryana, India. It was started as a breakaway faction of the Indian National Congress by former Haryana Chief Minister Bhajan Lal in 2007. The party forged an alliance with the Bharatiya Janata Party (BJP) for the 2014 parliamentary elections.

In April 2016, the party merged with Indian National Congress after nine years of separation

== History ==
First Proposed election symbol

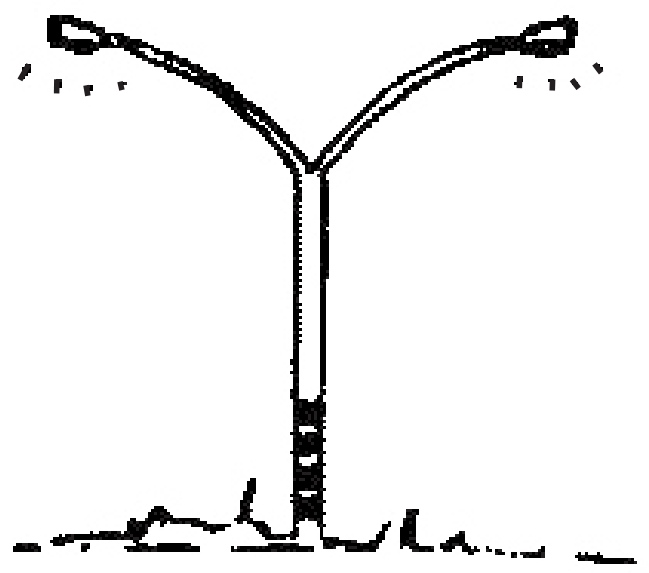
Electric Pole Symbol used during 2008 By-election and 2009 Lok Sabha election

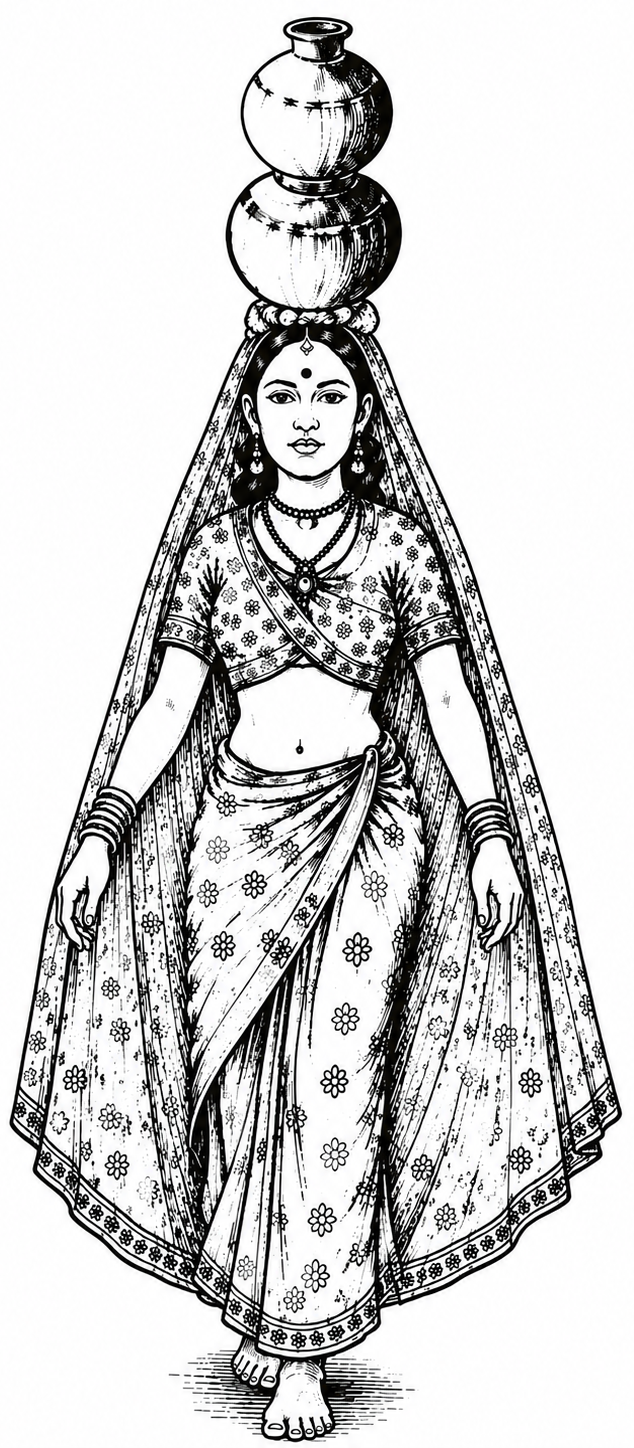
Paniharin Symbol used during 2009 Haryana Vidhan Sabha election

In August 2009, the HJC joined hands with the Bahujan Samaj Party. The alliance was however called off by the BSP before the Vidhan Sabha elections. In the 2009 Lok Sabha elections, the party won in Hisar where Lal emerged as winner. In the 2009 Vidhan Sabha elections, the party contested 87 out of the 90 total seats and won six. But five of its MLA's defected to Indian National Congress to support the Bhupinder Singh Hooda-led government.

In September 2013, Kuldeep Bishnoi declared his support for the BJP by backing the party's Prime Ministerial candidate, Narendra Modi.

In 2014, the party aligned itself with the BJP-led National Democratic Alliance to fight the general election in 2014. The HJC won the Hisar by-election. However, in the 2014 general election, HJC chief Bishnoi lost to Dushyant Chautala in the same parliamentary constituency.

In August 2014, Bishnoi ended the alliance with the BJP and joined with the Venod Sharma-led Haryana Jan Chetna Party for the Assembly elections in Haryana. They won two seats.

On 28 April 2016, the party merged with the Indian National Congress. Bishnoi and his wife were the only two MLAs of the party in Haryana assembly . The merger, took place in the presence of Congress chief, Sonia Gandhi and Vice President, Rahul Gandhi.

== See also ==
- Indian National Congress breakaway parties
