= Meerut Assembly constituency =

Legislative Assembly constituency in Uttar Pradesh State, India

Coordinates: 28.98°N 77.7°E

Meerut
- Constituency No. 48 for the Uttar Pradesh Legislative Assembly

Constituency details
- Country: India
- Region: North India
- State: Uttar Pradesh
- District: Meerut
- Lok Sabha constituency: Meerut
- Total electors: 312,368
- Reservation: None

Member of Legislative Assembly
- 18th Uttar Pradesh Legislative Assembly
- Incumbent Rafiq Ansari
- Party: Samajwadi Party
- Elected year: 2022

Meerut Assembly constituency is a part of Meerut district, Uttar Pradesh, India. VVPAT facility with EVMs have been here in 2017 U.P. assembly polls.

== Members of Legislative Assembly ==
Year	Member	Party
1952	Kailash Prakash	Indian National Congress
1957	Kailash Prakash	Indian National Congress
1962	Jagdish Saran Rastogi	Indian National Congress
1967	Mohan Lal Kapoor	Bharatiya Jana Sangh
1969	Mohan Lal Kapoor	Bharatiya Jana Sangh
1974	Mohan Lal Kapoor	Bharatiya Jana Sangh
1977	Manzoor Ahmed	Indian National Congress
1980	Manzoor Ahmed	Indian National Congress (I)
1985	Jai Narain Sharma	Indian National Congress
1989	Laxmikant Bajpai	Bharatiya Janata Party
1991	–	
1993	Haji Mohammed Shahid Akhlaq	Janata Dal
1996	Laxmikant Bajpai	Bharatiya Janata Party
2002	Laxmikant Bajpai	Bharatiya Janata Party
2007	Haji Yaqoob Qureshi	United Democratic Front
2012	Laxmikant Bajpai	Bharatiya Janata Party
2017	Rafiq Ansari	Samajwadi Party
2022	Rafiq Ansari	Samajwadi Party

== Election results ==
=== 2027 ===
2027 Uttar Pradesh Legislative Assembly election: Meerut
Party	Candidate	Votes	%	±%
SP	Mohammad Adeeb Qureshi			
NDA				
BSP				
NOTA	None of the above			
Majority				
Turnout				
gain from		Swing		

=== 2022 ===
2022 Uttar Pradesh Legislative Assembly election: Meerut
Party	Candidate	Votes	%	±%
SP	Rafiq Ansari	106,395	52.77	−0.02
BJP	Kamal Sharma	80,330	39.84	+1.76
INC	Ranjan Sharma	5,333	2.64	
BSP	Dilshad Ali	4,939	2.45	−4.01
AIMIM	Imran Ahmad	3,038	1.51	
NOTA	None of the above	620	0.31	−0.07
Majority		26,065	12.93	−1.78
Turnout		201,638	64.55	−0.14
SP hold		Swing		

=== 2017 ===
2017 Uttar Pradesh Legislative Assembly election: Meerut
Party	Candidate	Votes	%	±%
SP	Rafiq Ansari	103,217	52.79	
BJP	Laxmikant Bajpai	74,448	38.08	
BSP	Pankaj Jauli	12,636	6.46	
NOTA	None of the above	738	0.38	
Majority		28,769	14.71	
Turnout		195,516	64.69	
SP gain from BJP		Swing		

== See also ==
- List of constituencies of the Uttar Pradesh Legislative Assembly
- Meerut district
