= Tigaon, Haryana =

Tigaon Teegaon
- Town / Sub-Tehsil
- Location in Haryana, India Tigaon (India)
- Coordinates: 28°21′45″N 77°22′30″E
- Country: India
- State: Haryana
- District: Faridabad

Government
  - Type: Panchayati Raj
  - Body: Gram Panchayat
- Elevation: 198 m (650 ft)

Population (2011)
  - Total: 19,668

Languages
  - Official: Hindi
  - Regional: Haryanvi
- Time zone: UTC+5:30 (IST)
- PIN: 121101
- Telephone code: 0129
- ISO 3166 code: IN-HR
- Vehicle registration: HR-51 (Faridabad)
- Sex ratio: 867 ♂/♀
- Literacy: 69.5%
- Lok Sabha constituency: Faridabad
- Vidhan Sabha constituency: Tigaon
- Website: faridabad.nic.in

Tigaon is a town and sub-tehsil in the Faridabad district of the Indian state of Haryana. It lies within the National Capital Region (NCR) and is approximately 10 km southeast of Faridabad. Tigaon is represented in the Haryana Legislative Assembly by Tigaon Assembly constituency.

== Geography ==
Tigaon is located at 28°21′45″N 77°22′30″E with an average elevation of 198 meters. The area lies near the Agra Canal and is part of the semi-arid region of southern Haryana.

== Administration ==
Tigaon functions as a sub-tehsil under the jurisdiction of the Faridabad district administration. The town is governed by a local Gram Panchayat under the Panchayati Raj system. Tigaon also serves as an assembly constituency in the Haryana Vidhan Sabha.

== Demographics ==
As per the 2011 Census of India, Tigaon has a population of 19,668, with 10,530 males and 9,138 females. The literacy rate stands at 69.5% (male: 77.1%, female: 60.8%). The child population (ages 0–6) is 2,892.

== Education ==
Tigaon has educational institutions including a Government Degree College that offers undergraduate programs such as B.A. and B.Com. Several government and private schools are located in and around the town.

== Infrastructure ==
Tigaon is connected to nearby areas by road and public transport. In 2023, the Haryana government approved a ₹81 crore project to construct a four-lane road along the Agra Canal passing through Tigaon.

The electricity infrastructure has been reviewed and upgraded, with local MLAs conducting inspections to ensure power reliability.

== Politics ==
Tigaon is part of the Tigaon (No. 90) Assembly constituency in Haryana. In the 2019 and 2024 elections, Rajesh Nagar of the Bharatiya Janata Party was elected as the Member of Legislative Assembly.

In 2024, Rajesh Nagar defeated Independent candidate Lalit Nagar by a margin of 37,401 votes.

== Public Issues and Development ==
In the Haryana Assembly, infrastructure needs and population pressure on Tigaon and surrounding areas were discussed, especially concerning urban expansion from Faridabad.

== See also ==
- Faridabad
- Ballabhgarh
- Delhi NCR
- Haryana
