= Faridabad Lok Sabha constituency =

Lok Sabha constituency in Haryana

Coordinates: 28.404°N 77.319°E

Faridabad HR-10
- Lok Sabha constituency
- Interactive Map Outlining Faridabad Lok Sabha constituency

Constituency details
- Country: India
- Region: North India
- State: Haryana
- Assembly constituencies: Hathin; Hodal; Palwal; Prithla; Faridabad NIT; Badkhal; Ballabgarh; Faridabad; Tigaon
- Established: 1977
- Reservation: None

Member of Parliament
- 18th Lok Sabha
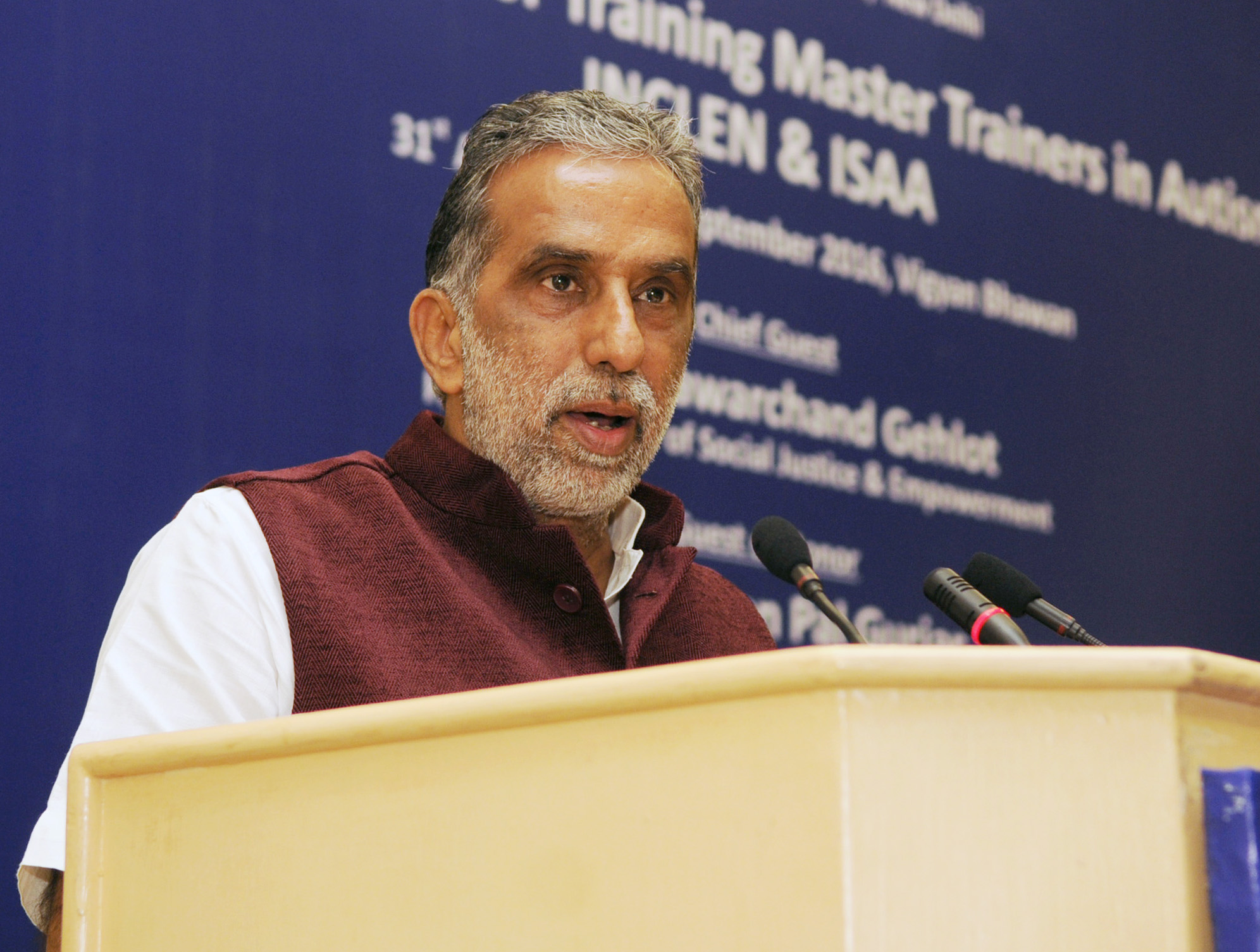
- Incumbent Krishan Pal Gurjar
- Party: BJP
- Alliance: NDA
- Elected year: 2024

Faridabad Lok Sabha constituency is one of the 10 Lok Sabha (parliamentary) constituencies in Haryana state in northern India.

== Assembly segments ==
At present, Faridabad Lok Sabha constituency comprises nine Vidhan Sabha (Legislative Assembly) constituencies:

#	Name	District	Member	Party	Leading (in 2024)
82	Hathin	Palwal	Mohd Israil	INC	INC
83	Hodal (SC)	Palwal	Harinder Singh	BJP	INC
84	Palwal	Palwal	Gaurav Gautam	BJP	BJP
85	Prithla	Faridabad	Raghubir Tewatia	INC	INC
86	Faridabad NIT	Faridabad	Satish Kumar Phagna	BJP	BJP
87	Badkhal	Faridabad	Dhanesh Adlakha	BJP	BJP
88	Ballabgarh	Faridabad	Mool Chand Sharma	BJP	BJP
89	Faridabad	Faridabad	Vipul Goel	BJP	BJP
90	Tigaon	Faridabad	Rajesh Nagar	BJP	BJP

== Members of Parliament ==
The Faridabad Lok Sabha constituency was created in 1977. The list of Member of Parliament (MP) is as follows:

Year	Member	Party
1952-76 : Constituency did not exist
1977	Dharam Vir Vasisht	Janata Party
1980	Tayyab Husain	Indian National Congress
1984	Rahim Khan	Indian National Congress
1988^	Chaudhary Khurshid Ahmed	Lokdal
1989	Bhajan Lal	Indian National Congress
1991	Avtar Singh Bhadana	Indian National Congress
1996	Ram Chander Bainda	Bharatiya Janata Party
1998	Ram Chander Bainda	Bharatiya Janata Party
1999	Ram Chander Bainda	Bharatiya Janata Party
2004	Avtar Singh Bhadana	Indian National Congress
2009	Avtar Singh Bhadana	Indian National Congress
2014	Krishan Pal Gurjar	Bharatiya Janata Party
2019	Krishan Pal Gurjar	Bharatiya Janata Party
2024	Krishan Pal Gurjar	Bharatiya Janata Party

^By poll

== Election results ==
=== 2024 ===
2024 Indian general election: Faridabad
Party	Candidate	Votes	%	±%
BJP	Krishan Pal Gurjar	788,569	53.60	▼15.08
INC	Mahender Pratap Singh	615,655	41.84	▲20.99
BSP	Kishan Thakur	25,206	1.71	
INLD	Sunil Tewatia	8,085	0.55	
JJP	Nalin Hooda	5,361	0.36	
NOTA	None of the above	6,821	0.46	
Majority		1,72,914	11.76	
Turnout		14,73,728	60.48	▼3.62
BJP hold		Swing		

=== 2019 ===
2019 Indian general elections: Faridabad
Party	Candidate	Votes	%	±%
BJP	Krishan Pal Gurjar	913,222	68.68	▲10.98
INC	Avtar Singh Bhadana	2,68,327	20.85	▲4.43
BSP	Mandheer Singh Maan	84,006	6.53	▲0.69
INLD	Mahendra Singh Chauhan	12,070	0.9	▼10.81
Majority		6,44,895	47.83	▲6.55
Turnout		13,28,127	64.10	▼0.87
BJP hold		Swing		

=== 2014 ===
2014 Indian general elections: Faridabad
Party	Candidate	Votes	%	±%
BJP	Krishan Pal Gurjar	652,516	57.70	▲27.35
INC	Avtar Singh Bhadana	1,85,643	16.42	▼24.84
INLD	R. K. Anand	1,32,472	11.71	▲11.71
AAP	Purshottam Dagar	67,355	5.96	new
BSP	Pt. Rajender Sharma	66,000	5.84	▼−12.31
NOTA	None of the Above	3,328	0.29	▲0.29
Majority		4,66,873	41.28	▲30.37
Turnout		11,30,725	64.97	▲8.31
BJP gain from INC		Swing	▲27.35	

=== 2009 ===
2009 Indian general elections: Faridabad
Party	Candidate	Votes	%	±%
INC	Avtar Singh Bhadana	257,864	41.26	▼1.03
BJP	Ramchander Bainda	1,89,663	30.35	▲10.03
BSP	Chetan Sharma	1,13,453	18.15	▲9.7
HJC(BL)	Chander Bhatia	31,163	4.99	N/A
IND.	Yash Pal Nagar	8,555	1.37	N/A
Majority		68,201	10.91	▼7.07
Turnout		6,24,937	56.66	−−−
INC hold		Swing		

=== 2004 ===
2004 Indian general elections: Faridabad
Party	Candidate	Votes	%	±%
INC	Avtar Singh Bhadana	357,284	42.29	
INLD	Chaudhary Mohammad Ilyas	2,05,355	24.31	
BJP	Ramchander Bainda	1,71,714	20.32	
BSP	Haji Abdul Malik	71,459	8.45	
Haryana Vikas Party	Devender Bhadana	13,042	1.54	
Majority		1,51,929	17.98	
Turnout		8,44,718	56.66	
INC gain from BJP		Swing		

=== 1989 ===
1989 Indian general election: Faridabad
Party	Candidate	Votes	%	±%
INC	Bhajan Lal	404,646	57.81	
JD	Khursid Ahmad Chaudhry	273,419	39.06	
BSP	Shiv Narian	6,723	0.96	
Independent	Raj Singh	4,301	0.61	
Majority		131,227	18.75	
Turnout		6,99,932	62.81	
INC hold		Swing		

=== 1984 ===
1984 Indian general elections: Faridabad
Party	Candidate	Votes	%	±%
INC	Chaudhary Rahim Khan	285,214	54.01	New
INC(J)	Tayyab Husain	1,50,843	28.57	▼0.54
Independent	Swami Inder Vesh	32,761	6.20	New
Independent	Cheti Lal Verma	32,228	6.10	New
NOTA	None of the Above	27,004	5.11	New
Majority		1,34,371	25.4	
Turnout		5,28,050	60.7	
Registered electors		8,69,828		
INC gain from INC(J)		Swing		

== See also ==
- Faridabad district
- List of constituencies of the Lok Sabha
