= Meerut Lok Sabha constituency =

Lok Sabha Constituency in Uttar Pradesh, India

Coordinates: 28.98°N 77.71°E

Meerut UP-10
- Lok Sabha constituency
- Interactive Map Outlining Meerut Lok Sabha constituency

Constituency details
- Country: India
- Region: North India
- State: Uttar Pradesh
- Assembly constituencies: Kithore; Meerut Cantt. Meerut; Meerut South; Hapur
- Established: 1952
- Total electors: 20,00,530
- Reservation: None

Member of Parliament
- 18th Lok Sabha
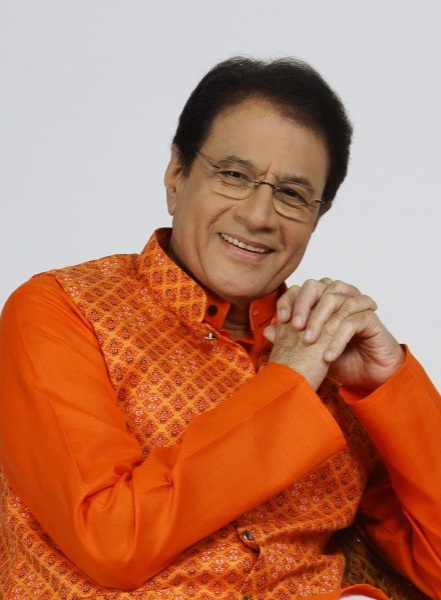
- Incumbent Arun Govil
- Party: BJP
- Alliance: NDA
- Elected year: 2024
- Preceded by: Rajendra Agrawal

Meerut Lok Sabha constituency (Hindi pronunciation: [meːɾəʈʰ]) is one of the 80 Lok Sabha (parliamentary) constituencies in the Indian state of Uttar Pradesh. This constituency covers parts of Meerut and Hapur districts.

== Assembly segments ==
Presently, Meerut Lok Sabha constituency comprises 5. Vidhan Sabha (legislative assembly) segments. In 2022, BJP won 3 and samajwadi party won 2.

No	Name	District	Member	Party	2024 lead
46	Kithore	Meerut	Shahid Manzoor	SP	SP
47	Meerut Cantt.	Meerut	Amit Agarwal	BJP	BJP
48	Meerut	Meerut	Rafiq Ansari	SP	SP
49	Meerut South	Meerut	Somendra Tomar	BJP	SP
59	Hapur (SC)	Hapur	Vijay Pal	BJP	SP

== Members of Parliament ==
Year	Member	Party
1952	Shah Nawaz Khan	Indian National Congress
1957	Shah Nawaz Khan	Indian National Congress
1962	Shah Nawaz Khan	Indian National Congress
1967	Maharaj Singh Bharti	Samyukta Socialist Party
1971	Shah Nawaz Khan	Indian National Congress
1977	Kailash Prakash	Janata Party
1980	Mohsina Kidwai	Indian National Congress
1984	Mohsina Kidwai	Indian National Congress
1989	Harish Pal	Janata Dal
1991	Election countermanded due to violence	
1994^	Thakur AmarPal Singh Chauhan	Bharatiya Janata Party
1996	Thakur AmarPal Singh Chauhan	Bharatiya Janata Party
1998	Thakur AmarPal Singh Chauhan	Bharatiya Janata Party
1999	Thakur AmarPal Singh Chauhan	Bharatiya Janata Party
2004	Mohammed Shahid Akhlaq	Bahujan Samaj Party
2009	Rajendra Agarwal	Bharatiya Janata Party
2014	Rajendra Agarwal	Bharatiya Janata Party
2019	Rajendra Agarwal	Bharatiya Janata Party
2024	Arun Govil	Bharatiya Janata Party

^By-Poll

== Election results ==
Vote share of winning candidates
2024	46.21%
2019	48.19%
2014	47.86%
2009	31.90%
2004	36.20%

=== General Election 2024 ===
2024 Indian general election: Meerut
Party	Candidate	Votes	%	±%
BJP	Arun Govil	546,469	46.21	−1.98
SP	Sunita Verma	5,35,884	45.32	N/A
BSP	Devvrat Kumar Tyagi	87,025	7.36	−40.44
NOTA	None of the above	4,776	0.40	−0.12
Majority		10,585	0.89	+0.50
Turnout		11,82,479	59.11	−5.18
BJP hold		Swing		

=== 2019 ===
2019 Indian general elections: Meerut
Party	Candidate	Votes	%	±%
BJP	Rajendra Agarwal	586,184	48.19	
BSP	Haji Yaqoob Qureshi	5,81,455	47.80	
INC	Harendra Agarwal	34,479	2.83	
NOTA	None of the Above	6,316	0.52	
Majority		4,729	0.39	
Turnout		12,16,940	64.29	
BJP hold		Swing		

=== General election 2014 ===
2014 Indian general elections: Meerut
Party	Candidate	Votes	%	±%
BJP	Rajendra Agarwal	532,981	47.86	+15.96
BSP	Mohammed Shahid Akhlaq	3,00,655	27.00	+1.58
SP	Shahid Manzoor	2,11,759	19.01	−6.21
INC	Nagma	42,911	3.85	−4.53
AAP	Dr. (Maj.) Himanshu Singh	11,793	1.06	+1.06
NOTA	None of the Above	5,213	0.47	+0.47
Majority		2,32,326	20.86	+14.38
Turnout		11,13,671	63.12	+14.89
BJP hold		Swing	+15.96	

=== General election 2009 ===
2009 Indian general elections: Meerut
Party	Candidate	Votes	%	±%
BJP	Rajendra Agrawal	232,137	31.90	+31.90
BSP	Malook Nagar	1,84,991	25.42	−10.78
SP	Shahid Manzoor	1,83,527	25.22	+25.22
INC	Rajendra Sharma	61,003	8.38	−1.07
Independent	Mohammed Shahid Akhlaq	34,078	4.68	
Majority		47,146	6.48	
Turnout		7,27,711	48.23	
BJP gain from BSP		Swing		

=== General election 2004 ===
2004 Indian general election: Meerut
Party	Candidate	Votes	%	±%
BSP	Mohammed Shahid Akhlaq	252,518	36.20	
RLD	Malook Nagar	1,83,182	26.26	
JD(U)	K. C. Tyagi	1,67,221	23.97	
INC	K. K. Sharma	65,914	9.45	
SS	Anil Rastogi	15,058	2.16	
Majority		69,336	9.94	
Turnout		6,97,484	52.44	
BSP gain from INC		Swing		

=== 1989 ===
1989 Indian general election: Meerut
Party	Candidate	Votes	%	±%
JD	Harish Pal	312,856	58.47	
INC	Mohsina Kidwai	190,815	35.66	
BJP	Sangh Priya Gautam	13,105	2.45	
Independent	Gufran	6,478	1.21	
Majority		122,041	22.81	
Turnout		5,35,105	56.89	
JD gain from INC		Swing		

=== 1980 ===
1980 Indian general election: Meerut
Party	Candidate	Votes	%	±%
INC(I)	Mohsina Kidwai	179,004	42.15	
JP(S)	Harish Pal	121,787	28.68	
JP	Kailash Prakash	101,219	23.83	
Independent	Ratan Lal	4,435	1.04	
Independent	Rajendra	4,082	0.96	
Independent	Jagan Nath Chanyoti	3,635	0.86	
Independent	Brij Nandan Gupta	2,457	0.58	
Majority		57,217	13.47	
Turnout		4,24,707		
INC(I) hold		Swing		

== See also ==
- Meerut district
- List of constituencies of the Lok Sabha
