= Laxmikant Bajpai =

Indian politician

Dr. Laxmikant Bajpai

Member of Parliament, Rajya Sabha
- Incumbent
- Assumed office 5 July 2022
- Preceded by: Shiv Pratap Shukla
- Constituency: Uttar Pradesh

President of Bharatiya Janata Party, Uttar Pradesh
- In office 13 April 2012 – 8 April 2016
- Preceded by: Surya Pratap Shahi
- Succeeded by: Keshav Prasad Maurya

Minister of Animal Husbandry & Dairying Government of Uttar Pradesh
- In office 11 October 2002 – 29 August 2003
- Chief Minister: Mayawati

Member of Uttar Pradesh Legislative Assembly
- In office 2012–2017
- Preceded by: Haji Yaqub
- Succeeded by: Rafiq Ansari
- Constituency: Meerut
- In office 1996–2007
- Preceded by: Akhlakh
- Succeeded by: Haji Yaqub
- Constituency: Meerut
- In office 1989–1991
- Preceded by: Jainarain Sharma
- Constituency: Meerut

Personal details
- Born: 20 July 1951 (age 75) Meerut, Uttar Pradesh, India
- Party: Bharatiya Janata Party
- Spouse: Dr. Madhu Bajpai (m. 1979)
- Children: One Son, Three Daughters
- Education: Meerut University; Rishikul Ayurveda College, Haridwar (now Uttarakhand Ayurved University - Rishikul Campus, Haridwar)
- Profession: Doctor, Businessman, Politician

Laxmikant Bajpai (born 20 July 1951) is an Indian politician and present National Vice President BJP India, former State President of BJP's Uttar Pradesh unit. He was elected four times as member of the Uttar Pradesh Legislative Assembly from Meerut assembly constituency.

In July 2022, he was appointed the BJP's new Chief Whip in the Upper House (Rajya Sabha) of Parliament.

== Education ==
He studied B.Sc. from Meerut College, Meerut and later obtained a BAMS degree from Rishikul Ayurveda College, Haridwar (now Uttarakhand Ayurved University - Rishikul Campus, Haridwar).

== Student politics ==
He was the General Secretary of the Student Union in his college days. During this tenure Laxmikant protested in front of many senior leaders and succeeded in obtaining government aids and management for all the Ayurvedic colleges of the state.

== Later politics ==
In 1977 he became the President of Yuva Morcha ( Youth Cell) of Janata Party. During 1980-87 he was District General Secretary of BJP Meerut. 1984-86 he was the vice president of BJP Yuva Morch in Uttar Pradesh. He is an active legislator as well and prominently takes part in the legislative debates. He had the membership of many committees of Uttar Pradesh Legislative Assembly.

He is noted for his honesty and austere lifestyle and is still seen riding his scooter. He was reelected as the president of BJP Uttar Pradesh in December 2012 on account of his excellent track record.

After his appointment as the president, the BJP has recorded a landslide victory in the Municipal Elections by collecting 10 out of the 12 mayor seats and an increased vote percentage. During his ongoing tenure BJP has also won Kannauj Civic Polls.

Experts believe that if given a free hand Bajpai on account of his clean image, effective management and contact with workers will lead BJP to regain its lost glory in Uttar Pradesh. The organizational and political skills of Bajpai worked well for the BJP when the party won 71 out of the 80 seats in Uttar Pradesh in the General elections 2014, which is by far its best total.
