= Anand Kaushik =

Indian politician. from Haryana

Anand Kaushik (born 20 August 1951) is an Indian politician member of the Faridabad Assembly constituency 2009 representing the Indian National Congress party. Kaushik died in his home on 18 February 2026 at the age of 75. Senior leaders in Congress paid their respects by visiting his home shortly following his death.
