= Badkhal Assembly constituency =

Legislative Assembly constituency in Haryana State, India

Coordinates: 28.41°N 77.28°E

Badkhal
- Constituency No. 87 for the Haryana Legislative Assembly

Constituency details
- Country: India
- Region: North India
- State: Haryana
- District: Faridabad
- Lok Sabha constituency: Faridabad
- Total electors: 3,29,878
- Reservation: None

Member of Legislative Assembly
- 15th Haryana Legislative Assembly
- Incumbent Dhanesh Adlakha
- Party: Bharatiya Janata Party

Badkhal is one of the 90 Legislative Assembly constituencies of Haryana state in India. It is part of Faridabad district. As of 2024, it is represented by Dhanesh Adlakha of the Bharatiya Janata Party.

== Members of the Legislative Assembly ==
Year	Member	Party
Till 2009 : Constituency did not exist
2009	Mahender Pratap Singh	Indian National Congress
2014	Seema Trikha	Bharatiya Janata Party
2019	Seema Trikha	Bharatiya Janata Party
2024	Dhanesh Adlakha	Bharatiya Janata Party

== Election results ==
=== Assembly Election 2024 ===
2024 Haryana Legislative Assembly election: Badkhal
Party	Candidate	Votes	%	±%
BJP	Dhanesh Adlakha	79,476	49.68%	▲6.41
INC	Vijay Pratap Singh	73,295	45.81%	▲4.43
BSP	Manoj Choudhary	2,493	1.56%	▼1.75
AAP	Om Prakash Verma	1,681	1.05%	▼5.95
NOTA	None of the Above	1,509	0.94%	▼0.74
Margin of victory		6,181	3.86%	▲1.98
Turnout		1,59,984	48.17%	▼0.98
Registered electors		3,29,878		▲20.62
BJP hold		Swing	▲6.41	

=== Assembly Election 2019 ===
2019 Haryana Legislative Assembly election: Badkhal
Party	Candidate	Votes	%	±%
BJP	Seema Trikha	58,550	43.26%	▼9.24
INC	Vijay Pratap Singh	56,005	41.38%	▲16.25
AAP	Dharambir Bhadana	9,481	7.01%	New
BSP	Manoj Choudhary	4,481	3.31%	▼9.36
INLD	Ajay Bhadana	2,362	1.75%	▼4.52
NOTA	Nota	2,274	1.68%	▲0.95
CPI	Jagram Gautam	951	0.70%	▲0.03
Margin of victory		2,545	1.88%	▼25.49
Turnout		1,35,335	49.15%	▼11.08
Registered electors		2,75,347		▲24.01
BJP hold		Swing	▼9.24	

=== Assembly Election 2014 ===
2014 Haryana Legislative Assembly election: Badkhal
Party	Candidate	Votes	%	±%
BJP	Seema Trikha	70,218	52.51%	▲25.18
INC	Mahender Pratap Singh	33,609	25.13%	▼19.12
BSP	Dharambir Bhadana	16,949	12.67%	▼8.21
INLD	Chander Bhatia	8,377	6.26%	▲4.03
Independent	Sandeep Purushbhan	990	0.74%	New
NOTA	None of the Above	978	0.73%	New
CPI	Jagram Gautam	899	0.67%	New
Margin of victory		36,609	27.37%	▲10.45
Turnout		1,33,732	60.23%	▲4.52
Registered electors		2,22,042		▲65.11
BJP gain from INC		Swing	▲8.25	

=== Assembly Election 2009 ===
2009 Haryana Legislative Assembly election: Badkhal
Party	Candidate	Votes	%	±%
INC	Mahender Pratap Singh	33,150	44.25%	New
BJP	Seema Trikha	20,471	27.33%	New
BSP	Kartar Singh	15,641	20.88%	New
INLD	Hemraj	1,677	2.24%	New
HJC(BL)	Paramjeet Gulati	1,306	1.74%	New
NLHP	Partap Singh	595	0.79%	New
Independent	Islamuddin	482	0.64%	New
NCP	Rohtash	442	0.59%	New
Independent	Vinay	430	0.57%	New
Margin of victory		12,679	16.93%	
Turnout		74,911	55.70%	
Registered electors		1,34,480		
INC win (new seat)				

== See also ==
- List of constituencies of the Haryana Legislative Assembly
- Faridabad district
