= Satya Prakash Agarwal =

Indian politician

MLA, 17th Legislative Assembly
- In office March 2017 – March 2022
- Constituency: Meerut Cantt.

MLA, 16th Legislative Assembly
- In office March 2012 – March 2017
- Preceded by: Himself
- Succeeded by: Himself
- Constituency: Meerut Cantt.

MLA, 15th Legislative Assembly
- In office May 2007 – March 2012
- Preceded by: Himself
- Succeeded by: Himself
- Constituency: Meerut Cantt.

MLA, 14th Legislative Assembly
- In office February 2002 – May 2007
- Preceded by: Amit Agarwal
- Succeeded by: Himself
- Constituency: Meerut Cantt.

Personal details
- Born: 7 July 1939 (age 87) Meerut district, Uttar Pradesh
- Party: Bharatiya Janata Party
- Education: Junior High School
- Profession: Politician

Satya Prakash Agarwal is an Indian politician and a member of the 17th Legislative Assembly of Uttar Pradesh of India. He represents the Meerut Cantt. constituency of Uttar Pradesh and is a member of the Bharatiya Janata Party political party.

== Early life and education ==
Satya Prakash Agarwal was born in Meerut district, Uttar Pradesh. He was educated at Meerut.

== Political career ==
Satya Prakash Agarwal has been a MLA for four straight terms. He represents the Meerut Cantt. constituency and is a member of the Bharatiya Janata Party political party.

== Posts held ==
#	From	To	Position	Comments
01	2002	2007	Member, 14th Legislative Assembly	
02	2007	2012	Member, 15th Legislative Assembly	
03	2012	2017	Member, 16th Legislative Assembly of Uttar Pradesh	
04	2017	2022	Member, 17th Legislative Assembly of Uttar Pradesh	

== See also ==
- Meerut Cantt.
- Sixteenth Legislative Assembly of Uttar Pradesh
- Uttar Pradesh Legislative Assembly
