= Harish Pal =

Indian politician (born 1943)

Member of Parliament, Lok Sabha
- In office 1989-1991
- Preceded by: Mohsina Kidwai
- Succeeded by: Amar Pal Singh
- Constituency: Meerut, Uttar Pradesh

Personal details
- Born: 1 July 1943 (age 82) Meerut, United Provinces, British India (present-day Uttar Pradesh, India)
- Party: Janata Dal
- Spouse: Bina Pal

Harish Pal (born 1943) is an Indian politician. He was elected to the Lok Sabha, the lower house of the Parliament of India from the Meerut constituency of Uttar Pradesh as a member of the Janata Dal.
