= Avtar Singh Bhadana =

Indian politician

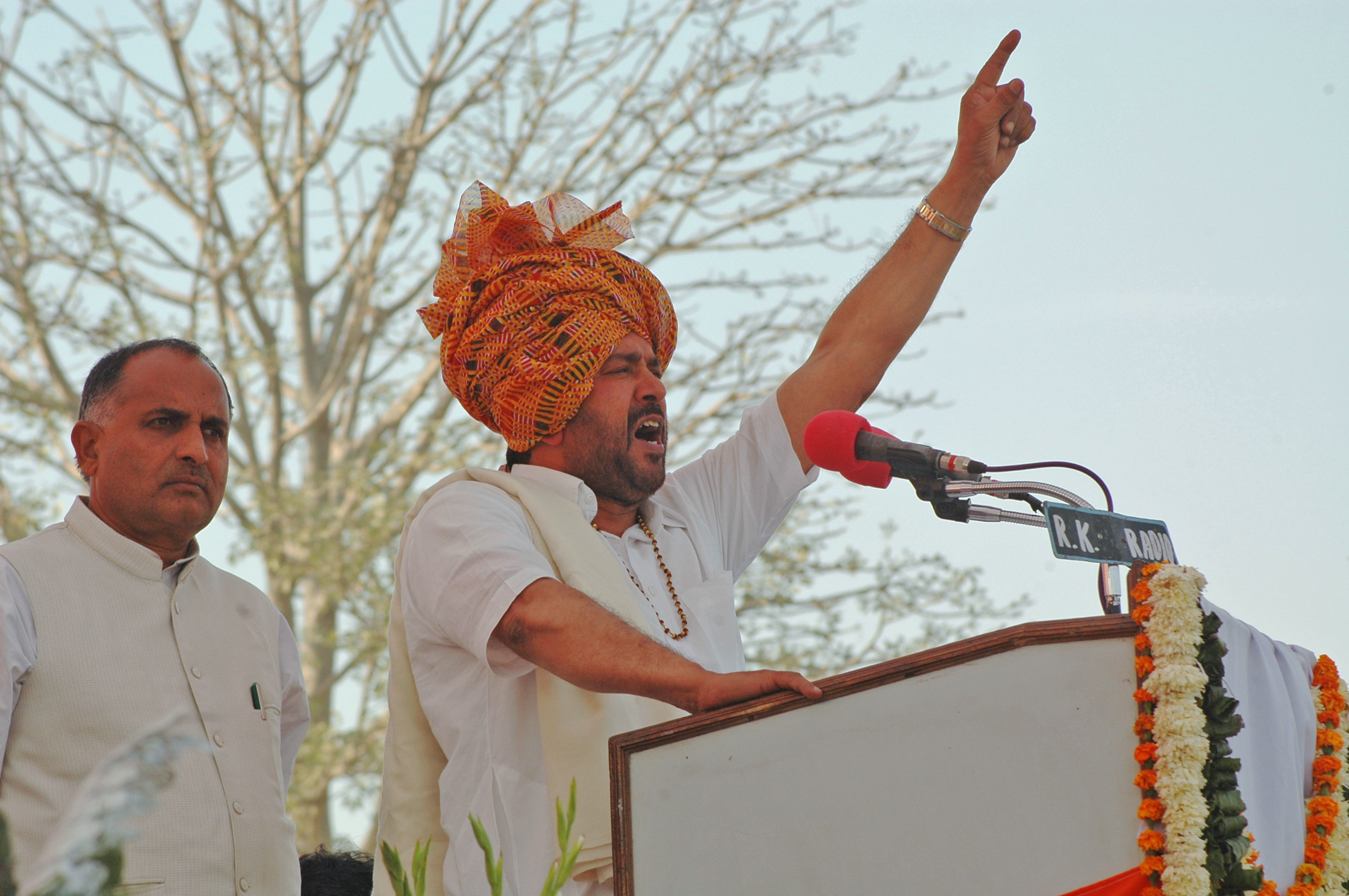

Member of the Uttar Pradesh Legislative Assembly
- In office March 2017 – March 2022
- Preceded by: Jamil Ahmad Qasmi
- Succeeded by: Chandan Chauhan
- Constituency: Meerapur

Member of Parliament, Lok Sabha
- In office 2004–2014
- Preceded by: Ram Chander Bainda
- Succeeded by: Krishan Pal Gurjar
- Constituency: Faridabad
- In office 1999–2004
- Preceded by: Amar Pal Singh
- Succeeded by: Mohd. Shahid Akhlaque
- Constituency: Meerut
- In office 1991–1996
- Preceded by: Bhajan Lal
- Succeeded by: Ram Chander Bainda
- Constituency: Faridabad

Personal details
- Born: 17 December 1957 (age 68) Anangpur Faridabad , India
- Party: Indian National Congress (2024-Present)
- Other political affiliations: Rashtriya Lok Dal (2022-2024) INC (1988-2014),(2019-2022); INLD (2014-2016); BJP (2016-2019)
- Spouse: Mamta Bhadana (m. 1985)
- Relations: Kartar Singh Bhadana (brother)
- Children: Arjun Bhadana (son); Ekta Bhadana (daughter)
- Education: 8th pass
- Occupation: Politician

Avtar Singh Bhadana (born 17 December 1957) is an Indian politician from Faridabad in Haryana. He is a former Minister in Haryana, former MP and former MLA of Uttar Pradesh representing the Meerapur Assembly constituency as a member of Bharatiya Janata Party (BJP). He has formerly been a member of the Lok Sabha for 4 terms.

He has won from Faridabad Lok Sabha in the years 1991, 2004 and 2009 and Meerut Lok Sabha in 1999. He was defeated by Krishan Pal Gurjar in 2014 and 2019 consecutively.

== Early life ==
Avtar Singh Bhadana was born on 17 December 1957 in a Hindu Gujjar family in Anangpur village in Faridabad district of Haryana. His father was Nahar Singh and his mother was Bharti Devi. Kartar Singh Bhadana is his brother.

== Politics ==
When he was 34, he became the Member of Parliament for Faridabad. Bhadana started his political career at a very young age and also became a minister in the Haryana government while he was also an MLA and MP for six months in the Devi Lal government.

He is the longest serving Lok Sabha MP from Gurjar Caste. The Chief Minister of Delhi, Arvind Kejriwal, also apologized to him in Court for claiming that Bhadana was one of the most corrupt politicians in the country.

== Electoral record ==
Year	Election	Party	Constituency Name	Result
1991	10th Lok Sabha	Indian National Congress	Faridabad	Won
1996	11th Lok Sabha	Indian National Congress	Faridabad	Lost
1998	12th Lok Sabha	Samajwadi Janata Party (Rashtriya)	Faridabad	Lost
1999	13th Lok Sabha	Indian National Congress	Meerut	Won
2004	14th Lok Sabha	Indian National Congress	Faridabad	Won
2009	15th Lok Sabha	Indian National Congress	Faridabad	Won
2014	16th Lok Sabha	Indian National Congress	Faridabad	Lost
2017	17th Uttar Pradesh Assembly	Bharatiya Janata Party	Meerapur	Won
2019	17th Lok Sabha	Indian National Congress	Faridabad	Lost
2022	18th Uttar Pradesh Assembly	Rashtriya Lok Dal	Jewar	Lost
