= Chandola Homoeopathic Medical College =

Homoeopathic institute in Uttarakhand, India

Coordinates: 28.950562°N 79.440332°E

Chandola Homoeopathic Medical College & Hospital (CHMC&H)
- Type: Private
- Established: 2002
- Affiliations: Uttarakhand Ayurved University
- Location: Kichha Road, Rudrapur, Uttarakhand
- Campus: Rudrapur
- Website: http://www.chandolahomeocollege.com

Chandola Homoeopathic Medical College & Hospital (CHMC&H) is a Homoeopathic institute located at Rudrapur in state of Uttarakhand, India. It is affiliated with Uttarakhand Ayurved University.

== History ==
The college was established since 2002, and is run by Chandola Educational Trust and managed by Managing Trustee Dr. K. C. Chandola.

== Courses ==
- Bachelor of Homoeopathic Medicine & Surgery (B. H. M. S.)
- MD

== Academic facilities ==
- Department of Anatomy
- Department of Biochemistry
- Department of Community Medicine
- Department of F. M. T.
- Department of Obst. & Gyn.
- Department of Physiology
- Department of Pathology & Microbiology
- Department of Pharmacy
- Department of Practice of Medicine
- Department of Homeopathic Materia Medica
- Department of Homeopathic Repertory & Case Taking
- Department of Organon of Medicine
- Department of Surgery

== Hospital ==
The Chandola Homoeopathic Medical College & Hospital includes facilities for imparting practical and clinical skills to make the clinical studies self-reliant, which confident to understand the clinical problem and diagnose with accuracy, prescribed a rational medication. Clinical medical, surgical & diagnostic facilities are available in the hospital.

1. Outdoor Patient Department:
2. Indoor Patient Department:

The college is running a 30-bedded well-equipped I. P. D. with Medicine, Surgery Gynaecology & Obstetrics & Pediatric Wards. There is facility to handle all types of clinical cases.
