= Amar Pal Singh =

Indian politician

Member of Parliament, Lok Sabha
- In office 1994–1999
- Preceded by: Harish Pal
- Succeeded by: Avtar Singh Bhadana
- Constituency: Meerut

Member of Uttar Pradesh Legislative Assembly
- In office 1989–1991
- Preceded by: Abdul Wahid Qureshi
- Succeeded by: Vijaypal Singh Tomar
- Constituency: Sardhana

Personal details
- Born: 31 May 1946 (age 80) Dhikauli village, United Provinces (now Uttar Pradesh), British India
- Party: Bharatiya Janata Party
- Spouse: Anita Singh (m. 1982)
- Children: 1 son
- Education: Meerut University (B.Sc)

Thakur Amar Pal Singh (born 31 May 1946) is an Indian politician and former member of the Bharatiya Janata Party from Uttar Pradesh. He served as a Member of the Lok Sabha representing Meerut (Lok Sabha constituency) and was elected to the 10th, 11th, and 12th Lok Sabha.

== Early life and education ==
He was from Meerut, Uttar Pradesh. He was born into a Chauhan Rajput family to Shri Durga Singh Chauhan in 1946.
