= Prakashwati Sood =

Deputy Minister for Social Welfare, Government of Uttar Pradesh
- In office 1962–1963

Member of the Uttar Pradesh Legislative Assembly
- In office 1957–1967
- Constituency: Meerut Cantonment

Personal details
- Party: Indian National Congress

Prakashwati Sood was an Indian freedom fighter and politician from Uttar Pradesh. She served as a Member of the Uttar Pradesh Legislative Assembly and held the post of Deputy Minister for Social Welfare in the Government of Uttar Pradesh under Chief Minister Chandra Bhanu Gupta in 1962.

== Political career ==
Sood was active in the Indian independence movement before entering state politics as a member of the Indian National Congress (INC). Following the 1962 Uttar Pradesh Legislative Assembly election, in which Congress retained power under Chandra Bhanu Gupta, she was inducted into the state cabinet as Deputy Minister for Social Welfare - one of a small number of women to hold ministerial office in Uttar Pradesh at that time.
