= Transport Ministry (Haryana) =

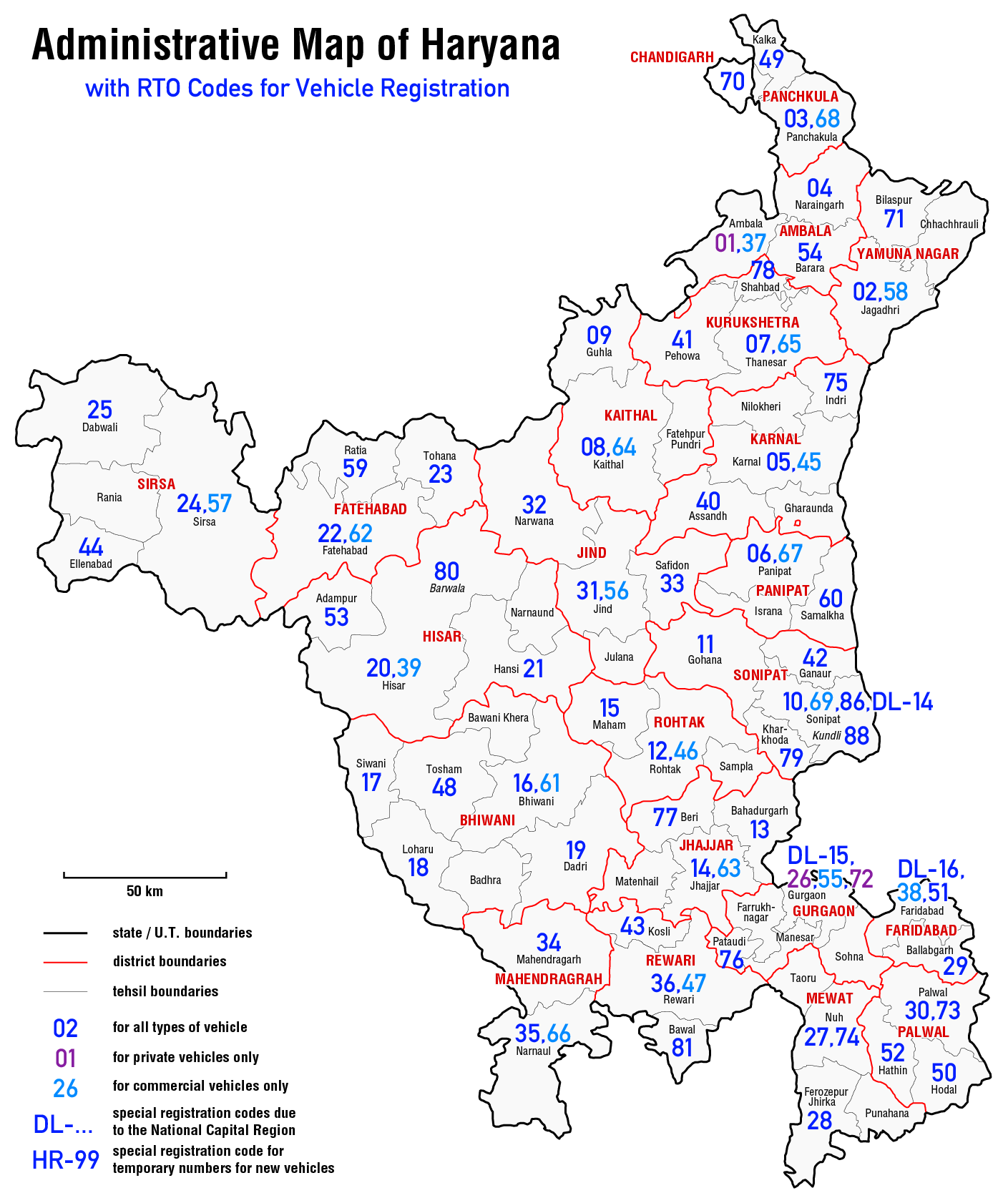
- Administrative map of Haryana with RTO codes for vehicle registration

Agency overview
- Parent agency: Government of Haryana
- Child agency: Transport Department (Haryana)

Ministry of Transport, Government of Haryana was established.

== List of ministers ==
- Ram Bilas Sharma (2014-2015)
- Krishan Pal Gurjar (1996–99)

== List of ministers of state ==
- Krishan Lal Panwar (2014-Incumbent)
- Dharambir (1987-1989)

== See also ==
- Haryana Roadways
