= Satyavir Tyagi =

Indian politician

MLA, 17th Legislative Assembly
- In office 2017–2022
- Constituency: Kithore, Meerut district

Personal details
- Party: Bharatiya Janata Party (2017-present) Rashtriya Lok Dal (2012-2017)
- Parent: Jaswant Singh Tyagi
- Occupation: MLA
- Profession: Politician

Satyavir Tyagi is an Indian politician and a member of 17th Legislative Assembly of Noida, Uttar Pradesh of India. He represents the Kithore constituency of Uttar Pradesh and is a member of the Bharatiya Janata Party.

== Political career ==
Satyavir Tyagi has been a member of the 17th Legislative Assembly of Uttar Pradesh. Since 2017, he has represented the Kithore constituency and is a member of the BJP. He was candidate of 16th Legislative Assembly of Uttar Pradesh KITHORE ASSEMBLY SEAT for RLD in 2012.

== Posts held ==
#	From	To	Position	Comments
01	2017	Incumbent	Member, 17th Legislative Assembly	

== See also ==
- Uttar Pradesh Legislative Assembly
