= Gajraj Bahadur Nagar =

Indian politician (1928 – 2001)

Gajraj Bahadur Nagar (1928 – 2001)
- Born: 1 October 1928; Bhuapur, Faridabad, Haryana, India
- Died: 2001 (aged 72–73)
- Education: Faculty of Law, University of Delhi, (LL.B)
- Occupations: Politician; Lawyer
- Years active: 1977–2001
- Political party: Janata Party
- Spouse: Bhawani Devi Nagar
- Relatives: Ajey Nagar (grandson)

Gajraj Bahadur Nagar (1928 - 2001) was an Indian politician. In 1954, he became the first elected President of Delhi University Students Union. Later in 1977, he went on to win the Haryana Legislative Assembly election from Mewla Maharajpur constituency of Faridabad and became the Minister of Food and Supplies in the Haryana Cabinet. He died in 2001 at the age of 73.

== Biography ==
Nagar was born in a Gujjar family in Bhuapur, a village in Faridabad, Haryana. He was a law (LLB) student and became the first student union president of DUSU in 1954-55. His wife Bhagwan Devi Nagar died in February 2021.

== See also ==
- Mewla–Maharajpur Assembly constituency
- 1977 Haryana Legislative Assembly election
