= Kithore Assembly constituency =

Constituency of the Uttar Pradesh legislative assembly in India

Kithore किठौर
- Constituency No. 46 for the Uttar Pradesh Legislative Assembly

Constituency details
- Country: India
- Region: North India
- State: Uttar Pradesh
- District: Meerut
- Established: 1956
- Total electors: 3,54,868 (2019)
- Reservation: None

Member of Legislative Assembly
- 18th Uttar Pradesh Legislative Assembly
- Incumbent Shahid Manzoor
- Party: Samajwadi Party
- Elected year: 2022

Kithore Assembly constituency is one of the 403 constituencies of the Uttar Pradesh Legislative Assembly, India. It is a part of the Meerut district and one of the five assembly constituencies in the Meerut Lok Sabha constituency. First election in this assembly constituency was held in 1957 after the "DPACO (1956)" order was passed and the constituency was constituted in 1956. The constituency was assigned identification number 46 after the "Delimitation of Parliamentary and Assembly Constituencies Order, 2008" was passed. In 1991 elections were not held in this constituency.

Tyagi and Muslim Communities are dominant in Kithore Assembly Constituency.

== Wards / Areas ==
Extent of Kithore Assembly constituency is KC Machhara & Kithore NP of Mawana Tehsil; KCs Rajpura, Kharkhauda & Kharkhauda NP of Meerut Tehsil.

== Members of the Legislative Assembly ==
Year	Member	Party
1957	Shraddha Devi	Indian National Congress
1962	Shraddha Devi	Indian National Congress
1967	Manzoor Ahmad	Samyukta Socialist Party
1969	Manzoor Ahmad	Samyukta Socialist Party
1974	Ram Dayal Singh	Bharatiya Kisan Kamgar Party
1977	Ram Dayal Singh	Janata Party
1980	Bhim Singh	Indian National Congress (I)
1985	Prabhu Dayal	Lokdal
1989	Parwez Khan	Janata Dal
1991	Elections not held	
1993	Ramkrishan Verma	Bharatiya Janata Party
1996	Parvez Haleem	Bharatiya Kisan Kamgar Party
2002	Shahid Manzoor	Samajwadi Party
2007	Shahid Manzoor	Samajwadi Party
2012	Shahid Manzoor	Samajwadi Party
2017	Satyavir Tyagi	Bharatiya Janata Party
2022	Shahid Manzoor	Samajwadi Party

== Election results ==
=== 2027 ===
2027 Uttar Pradesh Legislative Assembly election: Kithore
Party	Candidate	Votes	%	±%
INDIA				
NDA				
BSP				
NOTA	None of the above			
Majority				
Turnout				
gain from		Swing		

=== 2022 ===
2022 Uttar Pradesh Legislative Assembly election: Kithore
Party	Candidate	Votes	%	±%
SP	Shahid Manzoor	107,104	42.19	+9.33
BJP	Satyavir Tyagi	104,924	41.33	+4.02
BSP	Kushalpal Singh	31,213	12.29	−13.44
AIMIM	Tasleem Ahmad	4,833	1.9	
NOTA	None of the above	912	0.36	−0.15
Majority		2,180	0.86	−3.59
Turnout		253,869	69.45	−2.25
SP gain from BJP		Swing		

=== 2017 ===
2017 Uttar Pradesh Legislative Assembly election: Kithore
Party	Candidate	Votes	%	±%
BJP	Satyavir Tyagi	90,622	37.31	
SP	Shahid Manzoor	79,800	32.86	
BSP	Gajraj Singh	62,503	25.73	
RLD	Matloob Gaur	6,598	2.72	
NOTA	None of the above	1,224	0.51	
Majority		10,822	4.45	
Turnout		242,879	71.7	
BJP gain from SP		Swing		

=== 2012 ===
2012 General Elections: Kithore
Party	Candidate	Votes	%	±%
SP	Shahid Manzoor	73,015	36.3	−
BSP	Lakhi Nagar	61,909	30.78	−
RLD	Satyavir Tyagi	34,791	17.3	−
	Remainder 11 candidates	31,414	15.62	−
Majority		11,106	5.52	−
Turnout		201,129	66.36	−
SP hold		Swing		

== See also ==
- Meerut district
- Meerut Lok Sabha constituency
- Sixteenth Legislative Assembly of Uttar Pradesh
- Uttar Pradesh Legislative Assembly
