= Dhanesh Adlakha =

Indian politician

Member of Haryana Legislative Assembly
- Incumbent
- Assumed office 8 October 2024
- Preceded by: Seema Trikha
- Constituency: Badkhal

Personal details
- Party: Bharatiya Janata Party
- Profession: Politician

Dhanesh Adlakha is an Indian politician from Haryana. He became a Member of the Haryana Legislative Assembly in the 2024 election, representing the Badkhal constituency as a member of the Bharatiya Janata Party.

== See also ==
- 2024 Haryana Legislative Assembly election
- Haryana Legislative Assembly
