= Ram Chander Bainda =

Indian politician

Member of Parliament for Faridabad
- In office 1996–2004
- Preceded by: Avtar Singh Bhadana
- Succeeded by: Avtar Singh Bhadana

Personal details
- Born: 7 February 1946
- Died: 12 June 2018 (aged 72)
- Party: Bharatiya Janata Party

Ram Chander Bainda (7 February 1946 – 12 June 2018) was an Indian politician who was the elected member of Lok Sabha from Faridabad.

== Political career ==
Bainda won the Lok Sabha seat on Bharatiya Janata Party ticket from Faridabad in 1996, 1998 and 1999.

== Sources ==
- Rana, Mahendra Singh (2006), India Votes: Lok Sabha & Vidhan Sabha Elections 2001-2005 (1st ed.), New Delhi: Sarup & Sons, ISBN 81-7625-647-1
- Sharma, Suresh K, ed. (2005), Haryana: Past and Present, vol. II, New Delhi: Mittal Publications, ISBN 81-8324-048-8
