= Krishan Pal Gurjar =

Indian politician

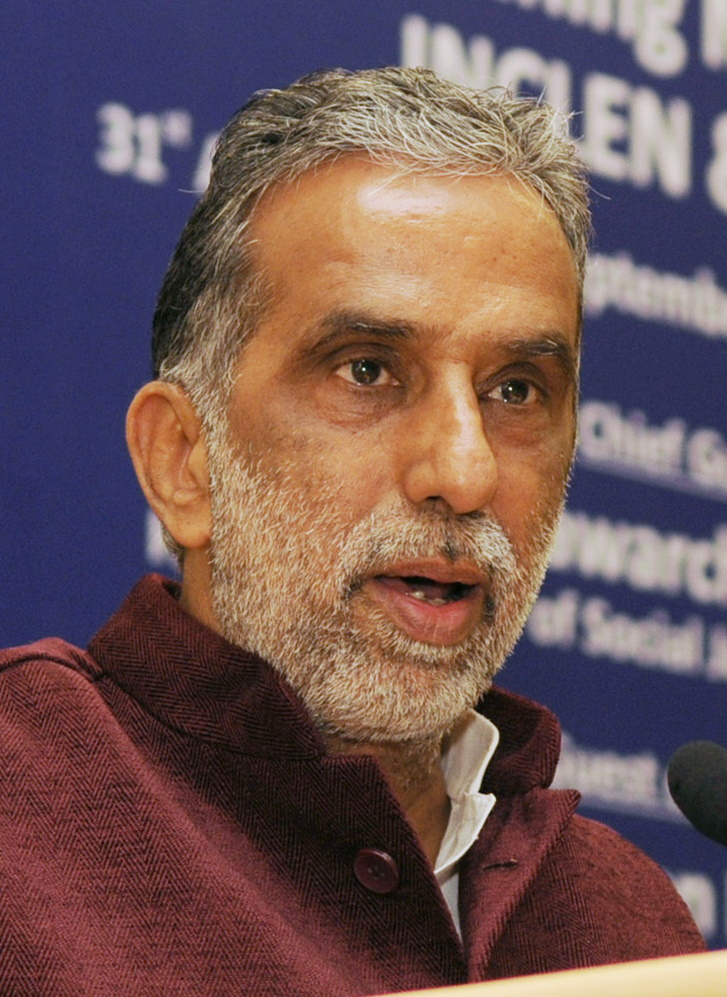
- Gurjar, c. 2018

Union Minister of State
- Incumbent
- Assumed office 26 May 2014
- Prime Minister: Narendra Modi
- Ministry: Term
- Power Heavy Industries: 7 July 2021 – 9 June 2024
- Social Justice & Empowerment: 9 November 2014 – 7 July 2021
- Road Transport & Highways Ports, Shipping & Waterways: 26 May 2014 – 9 November 2014
- Cooperation: 10 June 2024 – present

Member of Parliament, Lok Sabha
- Incumbent
- Assumed office 16 May 2014
- Preceded by: Avtar Singh Bhadana
- Constituency: Faridabad, Haryana

Haryana Minister of Transport
- In office 11 May 1996 – 24 July 1999
- Chief Minister: Bansi Lal

Member of Haryana Legislative Assembly
- In office 2009–2014
- Preceded by: Constituency established
- Succeeded by: Lalit Nagar
- Constituency: Tigaon
- In office 1996–2005
- Preceded by: Mahender Pratap
- Succeeded by: Mahender Pratap
- Constituency: Mewla–Maharajpur

Personal details
- Born: 4 February 1957 (age 69) Faridabad, Punjab, India (present-day Haryana)
- Party: Bharatiya Janata Party
- Spouse: Nirmla Devi (m. 1975)
- Children: 1

Krishan Pal Gurjar (born 12 February 1957) is an Indian politician and is the present Minister of State of Cooperation. As a Member of Parliament in the Lok Sabha, he represents the Faridabad constituency in the state of Haryana. He won this seat in the 2014 Indian general election as a BJP candidate by a margin of 4,66,873 votes and he won election with margin of over 6 lakh in 2019 from Faridabad constituency. In August 2014 he also inaugurated Manjhawli bridge which is his dream project. In March 2024, he was re-fielded as the BJP candidate for the Faridabad constituency in the 2024 General Elections.

== Early life and education ==
Krishan Pal Gurjar was born in Mewla Maharajpur, Faridabad, Haryana on 4 February 1957 to Hans Raj Zaildar. He completed his graduation from Jawaharlal Nehru College in 1978 and got his law degree from Meerut University.

== Career ==
He won the Corporation Councilor election in 1994 as a Bhartiya Janta Party candidate and became the party's State Minister. He became the Member of Legislative Assembly of Haryana for Mewla–Maharajpur constituency in 1996. He won the MLA seat in next two consecutive terms again. He served as Transport minister in Bansi Lal government from 1996 to 1999. He later served as BJP state President of Haryana.

Gurjar became Member of parliament, Lok Sabha from Faridabad in 2014 Indian general elections by defeating Avtar Singh Bhadana by 4,66,873 votes making him lose his election deposit. He defeated Bhadana again in 2019 Indian general elections by 6.44 lakh votes and became the member of 17th Lok Sabha. He declared his assets worth over ₹10 crore (US$1.0 million) in the election affidavit.

In May 2014, Gurjar became the Minister of State for Road Transport and Highways and Shipping. His ministry was later changed to Social Justice and Empowerment. He continued the position of Minister of State for Social Justice and Empowerment in May 2019 Second Modi ministry. Gurjar’s son and nephew are also politicians. His son Devender Chaudhary being Deputy Mayor of Municipal Corporation of Faridabad and his nephew Utkarsh Chaudhary was Vice President of Delhi University Students Union.

== Positions held ==
S. No.	Position / Ministries	Tenure	Along with (Cabinet)
1.	Transport Minister of Haryana	1996-1999	-
2.	Minister of Shipping, Road Transport and Highways (Minister of State)	2014-2019	Pon Radhakrishnan
3.	Minister of Social Justice and Empowerment (Minister of State)	2019-2021	Thawar Chand Gehlot (Cabinet) Ramdas Athawale, Rattan Lal Kataria
4.	Minister of Power and Heavy Industries (Minister of State)	2021-incumbent	Mahendra Nath Pandey (Heavy Industries) R.K.Singh (Power)

== Offices held ==
S. No.	Position	Constituency	Institution	Political Party	Tenure	Ref
1.	Member of Municipal Corporation	---	Municipal Corporation	BJP	1994-1996	
2.	Member of Legislative Assembly	Mewla–Maharajpur	Haryana Legislative Assembly	BJP	1996-1999	
3.	Member of Legislative Assembly	Mewla–Maharajpur	Haryana Legislative Assembly	BJP	2000-2005	
4.	Member of Legislative Assembly	Tigaon	Haryana Legislative Assembly	BJP	2009-2014	-
5.	Member of Parliament	Faridabad	Lok Sabha	BJP	2014-2019	
6.	Member of Parliament	Faridabad	Lok Sabha	BJP	2019–2024	
7.	Member of Parliament	Faridabad	Lok Sabha	BJP	2024–	

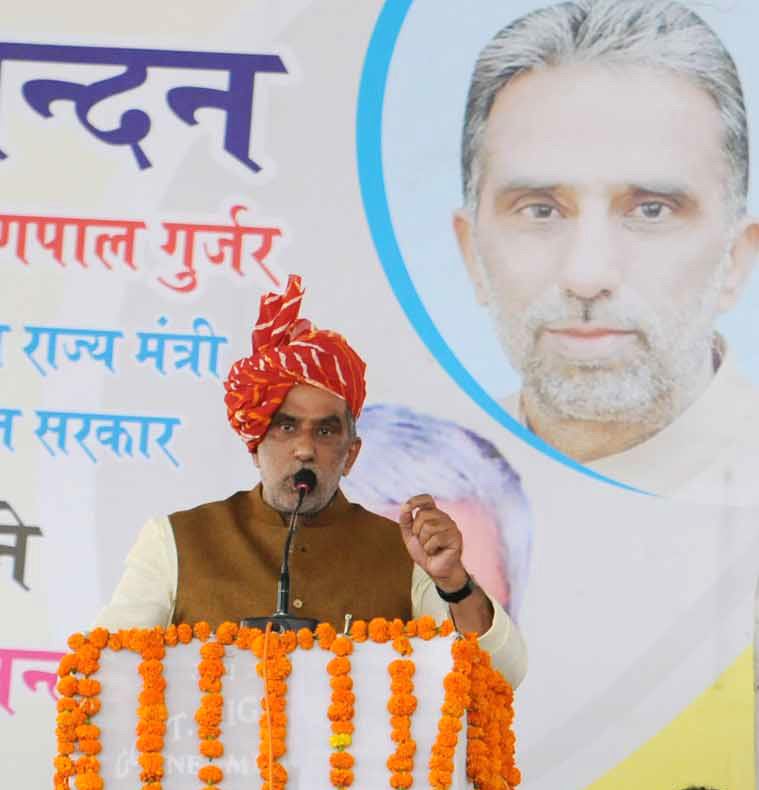
Krishan Pal addressing at the foundation stone laying ceremony of “Auxiliary Production Unit and State-of-the-Art Artificial Limbs Fitting Centre” of Artificial Limbs Manufacturing Corporation of India (ALIMCO) under DEPwD.

== See also ==
- Third Modi ministry
