= Vipul Goel =

Indian politician

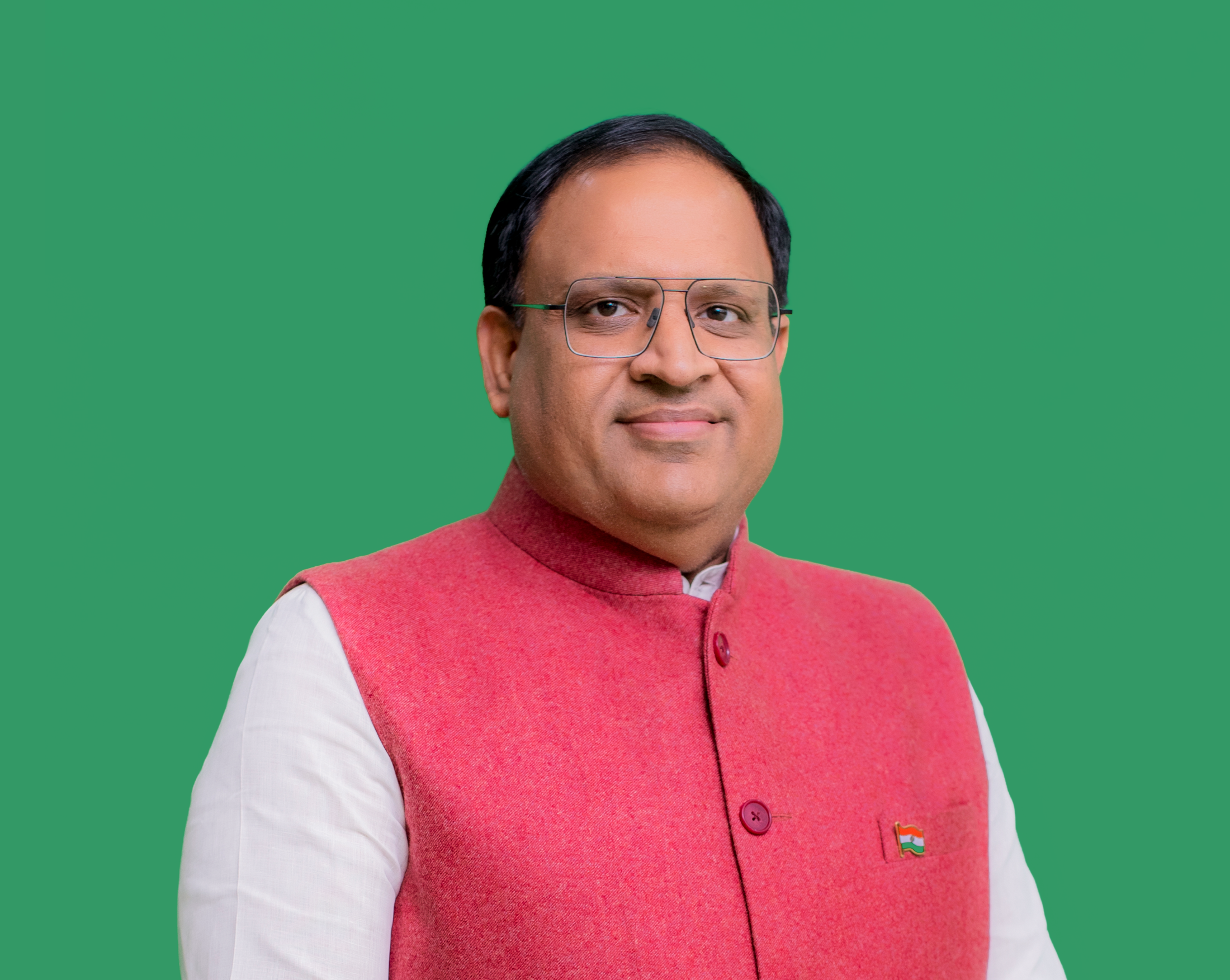

Minister of Revenue, Government of Haryana
- Incumbent
- Assumed office 17 October 2024
- Chief Minister: Nayab Singh Saini
- Preceded by: Nayab Singh Saini

Minister of Urban Local Bodies, Government of Haryana
- Incumbent
- Assumed office 17 October 2024
- Chief Minister: Nayab Singh Saini
- Preceded by: Kamal Gupta

Minister of Industry, Government of Haryana
- In office 22 July 2016 – 27 October 2019
- Chief Minister: Manohar Lal Khattar
- Preceded by: Abhimanyu Singh Sindhu
- Succeeded by: Dushyant Chautala

Minister of Environment, Government of Haryana
- In office 22 July 2016 – 27 October 2019
- Chief Minister: Manohar Lal Khattar
- Preceded by: Abhimanyu Singh Sindhu
- Succeeded by: Manohar Lal Khattar

Member of Haryana Legislative Assembly
- Incumbent
- Assumed office 2024
- Preceded by: Narender Gupta
- Constituency: Faridabad Assembly constituency
- In office 2014–2019
- Preceded by: Anand Kaushik
- Succeeded by: Narender Gupta
- Constituency: Faridabad Assembly constituency

Personal details
- Born: 25 April 1972 (age 54)
- Party: Bharatiya Janata Party
- Spouse: Pallavi Goel
- Children: 3
- Education: Bachelor of Commerce
- Alma mater: University of Delhi
- Occupation: Politician
- Website: Official Website

Vipul Goel (born 25 April 1972) is an Indian politician and former Member of Legislative Assembly, representing Faridabad constituency of Haryana Legislative Assembly, belonging to Bhartiya Janata Party. he is owner of Goyal motors

== Early life ==
He completed his graduation in bachelor of commerce from University of Delhi in 1992. His father is Late Sh. Rotash Chand Goel. He is married to Pallavi Goel and has one son and two daughters. By profession, he is a business person.

== Political career ==
Vipul Goel won the 2014 Haryana Legislative Assembly election for Bharatiya Janata Party, defeating Anand Kaushik of Indian National Congress. He is the chairman of Navchetna Trust.

Vipul Goel was designated as the Cabinet Minister on 22 July 2016 during the reshuffling and extension of Haryana Government of CM Sh Manohar Lal Khattar. He was assigned the Ministry of Industries and Commerce, Ministry of Environment and Ministry of Industrial Training.

On 3 March 2015, world's largest and tallest Indian flag was hoisted by BJP President Amit Shah, Haryana Chief Minister Manohar Lal Khattar, Actor Ranbir Kapoor. It was an initiative of Vipul Goel's Navchetna Trust.

MLA Vipul Goel launched free WiFi service in Sector 15 market of Faridabad in January 2016.

Goel is the Industry minister in Haryana Government.

== Awards ==
- Bharat Gaurav Award 2021

Political offices
Preceded by Anand Kaushik	Member of Legislative Assembly from Faridabad; 20 October 2014 – present	Succeeded by Incumbent
