= Maharaj Singh Bharti =

Indian politician (born 1918)

Member of Parliament, Lok Sabha
- In office 1967–1971
- Preceded by: Shah Nawaz Khan
- Succeeded by: Shah Nawaz Khan
- Constituency: Meerut, Uttar Pradesh

Personal details
- Born: 1 November 1918 Arnavali, Meerut district, United Provinces, British India
- Died: 14 September 1995 (aged 76)
- Party: Samyukta Socialist Party

Chaudhary Maharaj Singh Bharti (born November 1918, date of death unknown) was an Indian politician. He was elected to the Lok Sabha, the lower house of the Parliament of India from the Meerut constituency of Uttar Pradesh as a member of the Samyukta Socialist Party.
