= Mewla–Maharajpur Assembly constituency =

Former Constituency of the Haryana legislative assembly in India

Coordinates: 28.52°N 77.33°E

Mewla–Maharajpur
- Former constituency No. 52 for the Haryana Legislative Assembly

Constituency details
- Country: India
- Region: North India
- State: Haryana
- District: Gurgaon
- Lok Sabha constituency: Faridabad
- Established: 1976
- Abolished: 2008
- Reservation: None

Mewla–Maharajpur is a former constituency of the Haryana Legislative Assembly, in Faridabad, Haryana.

== Members of the Legislative Assembly ==
Election	Winner	Party
1977	Gajraj Bahadur Nagar	Janata Party
1982	Mahender Pratap	Lokdal
1987	Mahender Pratap	Indian National Congress
1991	Mahender Pratap	Indian National Congress
1996	Krishan Pal Gurjar	Bharatiya Janata Party
2000	Krishan Pal Gurjar	Bharatiya Janata Party
2005	Mahender Pratap	Indian National Congress

== Election results ==
=== Assembly Election 2005 ===
2005 Haryana Legislative Assembly election: Mewla–Maharajpur
Party	Candidate	Votes	%	±%
INC	Mahender Pratap	111,478	64.56%	▲46.72
BJP	Krishan Pal	48,370	28.01%	▼11.28
INLD	Hem Raj	4,609	2.67%	New
BSP	Rajpal	4,606	2.67%	▼36.50
Independent	Sunil	1,301	0.75%	New
Independent	Gyanender	956	0.55%	New
Margin of victory		63,108	36.55%	▲36.42
Turnout		1,72,676	51.30%	▲0.16
Registered electors		3,36,587		▲32.84
INC gain from BJP		Swing	▲25.27	

=== Assembly Election 2000 ===
2000 Haryana Legislative Assembly election: Mewla–Maharajpur
Party	Candidate	Votes	%	±%
BJP	Krishan Pal	50,912	39.29%	▼7.68
BSP	Mahender Pratap	50,751	39.17%	▲30.22
INC	J.P. Nagar	23,118	17.84%	▼10.41
Independent	Harinder	884	0.68%	New
JD(S)	Ashok	851	0.66%	New
Independent	Radhey Sham	703	0.54%	New
Margin of victory		161	0.12%	▼18.59
Turnout		1,29,574	51.14%	▲0.50
Registered electors		2,53,382		▼9.11
BJP hold		Swing	▼7.68	

=== Assembly Election 1996 ===
1996 Haryana Legislative Assembly election: Mewla–Maharajpur
Party	Candidate	Votes	%	±%
BJP	Krishan Pal	66,300	46.97%	▲26.41
INC	Mahender Pratap Singh	39,883	28.25%	▼22.30
BSP	Liyakat Ali	12,637	8.95%	New
Independent	Dharamvir Bhadana S/O Shankar	11,569	8.20%	New
SAP	Vinay Gupta	2,931	2.08%	New
CPI(M)	Mohan Lal	1,855	1.31%	New
Margin of victory		26,417	18.71%	▼10.03
Turnout		1,41,158	52.22%	▼6.53
Registered electors		2,78,786		▲55.62
BJP gain from INC		Swing	▼3.59	

=== Assembly Election 1991 ===
1991 Haryana Legislative Assembly election: Mewla–Maharajpur
Party	Candidate	Votes	%	±%
INC	Mahender Pratap Singh	51,775	50.56%	▲7.84
HVP	Gajraj Bahadur	22,341	21.82%	New
BJP	Rattan Lal	21,049	20.55%	New
JP	Jeevan Singh	4,792	4.68%	New
Independent	Jai Pal Singh	830	0.81%	New
Margin of victory		29,434	28.74%	▲6.21
Turnout		1,02,406	58.66%	▼2.11
Registered electors		1,79,142		▲21.12
INC hold		Swing	▲7.84	

=== Assembly Election 1987 ===
1987 Haryana Legislative Assembly election: Mewla–Maharajpur
Party	Candidate	Votes	%	±%
INC	Ch. Mahinder Pratap Singh	37,448	42.72%	▲16.78
Independent	Gajraj Bhadur Nagar	17,692	20.18%	New
VHP	Lala Narain Prasad (Chandi Wale)	10,356	11.81%	New
LKD	Jiwan Singh	8,748	9.98%	▼52.41
Independent	Ranvir Singh Chandila	6,675	7.61%	New
Independent	Hambbir Singh Bhandana	2,084	2.38%	New
Independent	K. K. Gupta	1,220	1.39%	New
INC(J)	Braham Pal	664	0.76%	New
Independent	K. D. Kapil	641	0.73%	New
Independent	Avtar Singh Bhadana	622	0.71%	New
Margin of victory		19,756	22.53%	▼13.92
Turnout		87,669	60.16%	▼2.41
Registered electors		1,47,907		▲45.92
INC gain from LKD		Swing	▼19.67	

=== Assembly Election 1982 ===
1982 Haryana Legislative Assembly election: Mewla–Maharajpur
Party	Candidate	Votes	%	±%
LKD	Mahendra Pratap Singh	39,008	62.39%	New
INC	Gajraj Bahadur	16,217	25.94%	▲10.47
Independent	Braham Pal	2,752	4.40%	New
Independent	Tej Singh	1,218	1.95%	New
CPI	Ho Ram	842	1.35%	New
JP	Ved Singh	532	0.85%	▼34.01
Independent	Lakhi Ram	357	0.57%	New
Independent	Jagannath	324	0.52%	New
Margin of victory		22,791	36.45%	▲34.51
Turnout		62,524	62.71%	▲2.88
Registered electors		1,01,364		▲50.09
LKD gain from JP		Swing	▲27.53	

=== Assembly Election 1977 ===
1977 Haryana Legislative Assembly election: Mewla–Maharajpur
Party	Candidate	Votes	%	±%
JP	Gajraj Bahadur Nagar	13,846	34.86%	New
Independent	Mohinder Pratap Singh	13,074	32.92%	New
INC	Dharam Vir Singh	6,144	15.47%	New
Independent	Narain Das	5,658	14.25%	New
Independent	Kamal Dev Kapil	590	1.49%	New
Independent	Teja	351	0.88%	New
Margin of victory		772	1.94%	
Turnout		39,715	59.67%	
Registered electors		67,534		
JP win (new seat)				
