= Lalit Nagar =

Indian politician

Member of the Haryana Legislative Assembly
- In office 2014–2019
- Preceded by: Krishan Pal Gurjar
- Succeeded by: Rajesh Nagar
- Constituency: Tigaon

Personal details
- Born: 15 April 1965 (age 60) Bhuapur village, Faridabad
- Party: Indian National Congress
- Spouse: Shimla Nagar
- Children: 3
- Occupation: Politician
- Profession: Politician

Lalit Nagar (born 15 April 1965) is a former member of the Haryana Legislative Assembly from the Indian National Congress representing the Tigaon Vidhan Sabha constituency in Haryana.
