= Yaqub Qureishi =

Indian politician

Haji Yaqoob Qureshi

Former member of Uttar Pradesh Legislative Assembly

Personal details
- Born: 1 January 1959 (age 67) Meerut
- Party: Bahujan Samaj Party
- Other political affiliations: Uttar Pradesh United Democratic Front

Haji Yaqoob Qureshi (born 1 January 1959) is an Indian politician who formerly served as a minister in the Uttar Pradesh Government. He was an elected MLA of the Bahujan Samaj Party. He has 6 criminal cases against him and assets of more than 8 crores.

== Biography ==
Haji Yaqoob Quraishi was elected from the Meerut seat in 2007 as a UPUDF candidate. In 2012, he changed his party to Bahujan Samaj Party (BSP).

In 2019, he contested the 2019 Lok Sabha election in the Meerut constituency. He lost to BJP Candidate Rajendra Agrawal by 3000 votes.

== 2015 Charlie Hebdo shooting controversy ==
He offered an $11 million reward for the death of cartoonists who drew cartoons that showed disrespect for Islam or the Muhammad. After the 2015 shooting at the Charlie Hebdo office in Paris, he announced the prize to be taken in cash from him.
