= Rajendra Agrawal =

Indian politician (born 1951)

Member of Parliament, Lok Sabha
- In office 16 May 2009 – 4 June 2024
- Preceded by: Mohammed Shahid Akhlaq
- Succeeded by: Arun Govil
- Constituency: Meerut, Uttar Pradesh

Personal details
- Born: 2 October 1951 (age 74) Pilkhuwa, Uttar Pradesh, India
- Party: Bharatiya Janata Party
- Spouse: Uma Agrawal (m. 1985)
- Children: 2 (1 son & 1 daughter)
- Parent(s): Om Prakash (father) & Satyavati (mother)
- Education: M.Sc (Physics)
- Alma mater: M. M.(P.G) College, Ghaziabad
- Occupation: Politician; businessperson

Rajendra Agrawal (born 2 October 1951) is an Indian politician and a former Member of Parliament (MP). He has represented the Meerut Lok Sabha constituency of Uttar Pradesh and is a member of the Bharatiya Janata Party (BJP).

He has been elected as a Member of Parliament from the Meerut-Hapur constituency for three times from 2009 to 2024. He is the Chairman of the Committee on Government Assurances and is also a member of Panel of Chairpersons of Lok Sabha. He was the Chairman of the Joint Parliamentary Committee on the Citizenship (Amendment) Bill, 2016.

== Early life and education ==
Rajendra Agrawal was born in Pilkhuwa, Uttar Pradesh to Shri Om Prakash Agrawal and Smt. Satyavati Agrawal. He holds master's degree (M.Sc) in Physics from M.M.(P.G) College, Modi Nagar, Ghaziabad, Uttar Pradesh. He is a businessperson by profession.

Agrawal joined Rashtriya Swayamsevak Sangh in school days as an active worker. He has worked as a Pracharak from 1971 to 1984.

== Political career ==
Agrawal started his political career as the President of BJP Meerut Mahanagar in 1997. He became the Incharge of BJP Intellectual and Training Cell of Western Uttar Pradesh in 2000. He further became the Secretary of BJP, Western Uttar Pradesh in 2002 and continued in the post till 2007. In 2007, he became the President of the BJP Intellectual Cell, Uttar Pradesh.

Agrawal contested from the Meerut-Hapur Lok Sabha constituency in 2009 General Elections and won from the seat. He was re-elected from the seat in 2014 by a record margin of over 2,30,000 votes. In 2019, he again won the Lok Sabha seat of the Meerut-Hapur Constituency by defeating his rival Yakub Qureishi and became the Member of 17th Lok Sabha.

== Parliamentary activity ==
Agrawal has been an active parliamentarian with a high attendance of 98% when the National Average is 80%. He has participated in 172 debates of the Parliament when the National Average is 67.1. He has also asked 298 questions and proposed 8 Private Member's Bills. Agrawal has raised some vital issues in Parliament including setting up of High Court Bench in Meerut, issues concerning water pollution, education, healthcare etc.

Agrawal is currently the Chairman of the Committee on Government Assurances and the member of Panel of Chairpersons, Lok Sabha. He has also been the Chairperson of the Joint Committee on the Citizenship (Amendment) Bill, 2016.

== Private Member Bills ==
Agrawal has introduced a number of Private Members' Bills in Parliament over some very important issues. Some of the bills that he has introduced are:

- The Code of Criminal Procedure (Amendment) Bill, 2018 (Amendment of the First Schedule): The Bill seeks to make stalking a non-bailable offense in line with the Justice Verma Committee recommendations. The Committee recognized stalking as a crime and recommended it to be made a non-bailable offense. But in contrast to the Committee recommendations, in the Criminal Law (Amendment) Act, 2013, enacted subsequently, the first offense of stalking was made bailable while any subsequent offense was made non-bailable. The bill aimed to amend the same.
- The Compulsory Teaching of Environmental Education in Educational Institutions Bill, 2018: The Bill seeks to make it mandatory for environmental education to be taught as a compulsory subject at all levels of education. The Honourable Supreme Court of India in its directive of 1991 had made it compulsory for environment education to be included in the school and college curricula. But it was observed that the Supreme Court's directive has not been implemented effectively so far.
- The Constitution (Amendment) Bill, 2018 (Amendment of article 75, etc.): The Bill made it mandatory that at least one-third of the total number of Ministers in the Council of Ministers should be women. Women represent almost half of the country's population but have a marginal proportion in influential and decision making roles of Government, both at the Union and at the State level. Although Indian Constitution has guaranteed equal opportunities for women in all walks of life through the fundamental right to equality, yet women's visibility in the power structure is severely limited. The bill aimed towards fielding women in power wielding institutions so that inequality in power structure can be bridged.
- The Designation of States as Sponsor of Terrorism Bill, 2017: The bill provides for designating certain states (Pakistan here) as Sponsors of Terrorism and withdraw trade and economic relations with the same, along with putting legal, travel and economic sanctions on the citizens of such state.
- The Right of Children to Free and Compulsory Education Bill, 2016 (Amendment of sections 2 and 3): The bill aims to create a uniform education system having a common syllabus and school curriculum for all stages of elementary education across the country. It also promoted value-based uniform education system across all schools.
- The Special Financial Assistance to the National Capital Region Bill, 2016: The bill aimed to provide for special financial assistance to the National Capital Region for the purpose of harmonized and balanced development of growth-oriented infrastructure in all areas of National Capital Region.
- The High Court at Allahabad (Establishment of a Permanent Bench at Meerut) Bill, 2016: There has been a long pending demand to establish a permanent Bench of the High Court in western Uttar Pradesh since 1955. Jaswant Singh Commission also recommended the establishment of a permanent Bench of Allahabad High Court in western Uttar Pradesh. The bill, therefore, seeks to provide for the establishment of a permanent Bench of the High Court at Allahabad at Meerut.

== Imprisonment ==
From July 1975 to April 1977, Agrawal was imprisoned for about 21 months under D.I.R & M.I.S.A. He has also faced several short-term imprisonments for Ayodhya and other social causes.

== Posts held ==
#	From	To	Position
01	2009	-	Elected to 15th Lok Sabha
02	20-Jul-2009	-	Member, Committee of Parliament on Official Language
03	31-Aug-2009	-	Member, Committee on Information Technology
04	16-Sep-2009	-	Member, Consultative Committee, Ministry of Railways
05	23-Sep-2009	-	Member, Committee on Petitions
06	May-2014	-	Re-elected to 16th Lok Sabha (2nd term)
07	1-Sep-2014	-	Member, Committee on Government Assurances, Standing Committee on Urban Development, Consultative Committee in Ministry of Rural Development, Panchayati Raj and Drinking Water and Sanitation
08	1 Sep. 2016	25 May 2019	Member, Standing Committee on Petroleum and Natural Gas
09	25 Dec. 2017	25 May 2019	Chairperson, Joint Committee on the Citizenship (Amendment) Bill, 2016
10	May, 2019		Re-elected to 17th Lok Sabha (3rd term)
11	21 June 2019		Member, Panel of Chairpersons, Lok Sabha

== See also ==
- List of members of the 15th Lok Sabha of India
