= Shahid Manzoor =

Indian politician

Member of the Uttar Pradesh Legislative Assembly
- Incumbent
- Assumed office February 2022
- Preceded by: Parvez Haleem Khan
- Succeeded by: Satyavir Tyagi
- Constituency: Kithore

Personal details
- Born: 1 December 1955 (age 70) Meerut, Uttar Pradesh, India
- Party: Samajwadi Party
- Spouse: Gulnaaz Shahid (wife)
- Parent: Manzoor Ahmed (father)
- Education: Chaudhary Charan Singh University
- Profession: Agriculturist, Lawyer & Politician

Shahid Manzoor is an Indian politician. He was a member of the 16th Legislative Assembly of Uttar Pradesh of India. He represented the Kithore constituency as a member of the Samajwadi Party political party.

According to nomination details, he has 2 criminal cases and 4.52 crores in cash and assets.

== Early life ==
Shahid Manzoor was born in Meerut district, Uttar Pradesh.

His father the late Manzoor Ahmed was a 5 time MLA. His family has been involved in politics since the 1960s.

== Political career ==
Shahid Manzoor was elected a MLA for three straight terms. He represented the Kithore constituency and he is associated with the Samajwadi Party political party.

== Posts held ==
#	From	To	Position	Comments
01	2002	2007	Member, 14th Legislative Assembly	
02	2007	2012	Member, 15th Legislative Assembly	
03	2012	2017	Member, 16th Legislative Assembly	
04	2022	Incumbent	Member, 18th Legislative Assembly	

== See also ==
- Kithore
- Sixteenth Legislative Assembly of Uttar Pradesh
- Uttar Pradesh Legislative Assembly
