= Ballabgarh Assembly constituency =

Legislative Assembly constituency in Haryana State, India

Coordinates: 28.34°N 77.32°E

Ballabhgarh
- Constituency No. 88 for the Haryana Legislative Assembly

Constituency details
- Country: India
- Region: North India
- State: Haryana
- District: Faridabad
- Lok Sabha constituency: Faridabad
- Total electors: 2,72,434
- Reservation: None

Member of Legislative Assembly
- 15th Haryana Legislative Assembly
- Incumbent Mool Chand Sharma
- Party: Bharatiya Janata Party
- Elected year: 2024

Ballabhgarh Assembly constituency is one of the 90 Legislative Assembly constituencies of Haryana state in India.

It is part of Faridabad district.

== Members of the Legislative Assembly ==
Year	Member	Party
1967	T. Ram	Indian National Congress
1968	Sharda Rani	Indian National Congress
1972	Sharda Rani	Indian National Congress
1977	Ch. Rajinder Singh Bisla	Independent
1982	Sharda Rani	Indian National Congress
1987	Yogesh Chand Sharma	Lokdal
1991	Ch. Rajinder Singh Bisla	Indian National Congress
1996	Anand Kumar	Bharatiya Janata Party
2000	Ch. Rajinder Singh Bisla	Independent
2005	Sharda Rathore	Indian National Congress
2009	Sharda Rathore	Indian National Congress
2014	Mool Chand Sharma	Bharatiya Janata Party
2019	Mool Chand Sharma	Bharatiya Janata Party
2024	Mool Chand Sharma	Bharatiya Janata Party

== Election results ==
=== Assembly Election 2024 ===
2024 Haryana Legislative Assembly election: Ballabgarh
Party	Candidate	Votes	%	±%
BJP	Mool Chand Sharma	61,806	42.16	▼12.26
Independent	Sharda Rathore	44,076	30.06	New
Independent	Rao Ram Kumar	23,077	15.74	New
INC	Parag Sharma	8,674	5.92	▼14.47
AAP	Ravindra Faujdar	6,634	4.52	▲2.52
NOTA	None of the Above	1,034	0.71	▼0.53
Margin of victory		17,730	12.09	▼21.93
Turnout		1,46,610	53.36	▲1.97
Registered electors		2,72,434		▲15.18
BJP hold		Swing	▼12.26	

=== Assembly Election 2019 ===
2019 Haryana Legislative Assembly election: Ballabgarh
Party	Candidate	Votes	%	±%
BJP	Mool Chand Sharma	66,708	54.42	▼2.51
INC	Anand Kaushik	24,995	20.39	▲7.22
Independent	Deepak Choudhary	18,542	15.13	New
BSP	Arun Visala	4,066	3.32	▼4.41
AAP	Hariender Kumar	2,461	2.01	New
INLD	Rohtash	2,110	1.72	▼9.88
NOTA	Nota	1,512	1.23	▲0.46
LSP	Kok Chand	787	0.64	New
Margin of victory		41,713	34.03	▼9.73
Turnout		1,22,587	51.39	▼8.97
Registered electors		2,38,540		▲18.66
BJP hold		Swing	▼2.51	

=== Assembly Election 2014 ===
2014 Haryana Legislative Assembly election: Ballabgarh
Party	Candidate	Votes	%	±%
BJP	Mool Chand Sharma	69,074	56.93	▲41.75
INC	Lakhan Kumar Singla	15,976	13.17	▼32.97
INLD	Lalit Kumar Bansal	14,072	11.60	▲4.33
BSP	Dhirender Singh	9,378	7.73	▼1.55
HJC(BL)	Ompal	4,570	3.77	▼10.77
Independent	Dharveer Khatana	3,281	2.70	New
HLP	Ved Prakash Yadav	1,897	1.56	New
NOTA	None of the Above	942	0.78	New
SP	Imran Khan	659	0.54	New
Margin of victory		53,098	43.76	▲12.81
Turnout		1,21,334	60.36	▲0.78
Registered electors		2,01,021		▲55.50
BJP gain from INC		Swing	▲10.79	

=== Assembly Election 2009 ===
2009 Haryana Legislative Assembly election: Ballabgarh
Party	Candidate	Votes	%	±%
INC	Sharda Rathore	35,535	46.13	▼8.66
BJP	Surender Tewatia	11,691	15.18	▲8.81
HJC(BL)	Chander Bhatia	11,194	14.53	New
BSP	Ompal Tonger	7,147	9.28	▲2.56
INLD	Anita Goswami	5,601	7.27	▼20.18
Independent	Bal Kishan	3,774	4.90	New
Independent	Hemlata	673	0.87	New
Margin of victory		23,844	30.96	▲3.61
Turnout		77,024	59.58	▼0.77
Registered electors		1,29,275		▼37.39
INC hold		Swing	▼8.66	

=== Assembly Election 2005 ===
2005 Haryana Legislative Assembly election: Ballabgarh
Party	Candidate	Votes	%	±%
INC	Sharda Rathore	68,289	54.79	▲45.99
INLD	Mool Chand Sharma	34,213	27.45	New
BSP	Nayan Pal Rawat	8,372	6.72	▼6.04
BJP	Anand Sharma	7,941	6.37	▼23.71
CPI	Narayan Prasad	1,866	1.50	▼0.88
SP	Jasbir Singh	1,168	0.94	▲0.34
Independent	Satya Pal	754	0.61	New
Margin of victory		34,076	27.34	▲19.26
Turnout		1,24,627	60.35	▲2.49
Registered electors		2,06,493		▲19.63
INC gain from Independent		Swing	▲16.64	

=== Assembly Election 2000 ===
2000 Haryana Legislative Assembly election: Ballabgarh
Party	Candidate	Votes	%	±%
Independent	Rajinder Singh Bisla	38,112	38.16	New
BJP	Ram Bilas Sharma	30,040	30.08	▼23.46
BSP	Shyam Raj Singh	12,746	12.76	▲4.04
INC	Subhash Chaudhari	8,796	8.81	▼11.44
Independent	Brahma Nand Kaushik	3,343	3.35	New
CPI	Narayan Prasad	2,379	2.38	New
JD(U)	Raj Kumar	1,226	1.23	New
Independent	Ravi Kant	915	0.92	New
HVP	Ram Kumar Alias Raj Kumar	766	0.77	New
SP	Surender Singh Urf Surender Singh Bhati	600	0.60	New
Independent	Dinesh Raghel	576	0.58	New
Margin of victory		8,072	8.08	▼25.21
Turnout		99,875	57.86	▲3.11
Registered electors		1,72,608		▼2.16
Independent gain from BJP		Swing	▼15.38	

=== Assembly Election 1996 ===
1996 Haryana Legislative Assembly election: Ballabgarh
Party	Candidate	Votes	%	±%
BJP	Anand Kumar	51,721	53.54	▲30.40
INC	Rajender S/O Gaj Raj	19,558	20.25	▼19.78
BSP	Rajender S/O Amar Singh	8,429	8.73	▲5.32
SAP	Mool Chand Sharma	7,445	7.71	New
JD	Hem Chand	1,749	1.81	New
AIIC(T)	Dharambir Singh	1,028	1.06	New
Independent	Kulwant Singh	644	0.67	New
Independent	Manmohan Raj	600	0.62	New
Independent	Parmod Kumar	534	0.55	New
Margin of victory		32,163	33.30	▲16.41
Turnout		96,599	56.63	▼2.11
Registered electors		1,76,422		▲24.62
BJP gain from INC		Swing	▲13.51	

=== Assembly Election 1991 ===
1991 Haryana Legislative Assembly election: Ballabgarh
Party	Candidate	Votes	%	±%
INC	Rajinder Singh Bisla	32,225	40.03	▲11.15
BJP	Anand Kumar	18,632	23.15	New
HVP	Sharda Rani	14,630	18.17	New
JP	Raj Kumar	7,366	9.15	New
BSP	Nanak Chand	2,740	3.40	New
Independent	Teeka Ram	2,724	3.38	New
Independent	Yad Ram	579	0.72	New
Margin of victory		13,593	16.89	▼4.46
Turnout		80,500	58.85	▼2.17
Registered electors		1,41,569		▲10.95
INC gain from LKD		Swing	▼10.19	

=== Assembly Election 1987 ===
1987 Haryana Legislative Assembly election: Ballabgarh
Party	Candidate	Votes	%	±%
LKD	Yogesh Chand Sharma	37,832	50.22	▲26.65
INC	Sharda Rani	21,756	28.88	▲0.53
Independent	H. R. Dua	7,753	10.29	New
Independent	Swami Skaktivesh	2,481	3.29	New
Independent	Het Ram Bhardwaj	1,702	2.26	New
INC(J)	Bhule Singh	993	1.32	New
Independent	Mahesh Chand	936	1.24	New
Independent	Ram Sarup S/O Lakhpat	429	0.57	New
Margin of victory		16,076	21.34	▲15.08
Turnout		75,328	60.10	▼9.60
Registered electors		1,27,599		▲36.68
LKD gain from Independent		Swing	▲15.61	

=== Assembly Election 1982 ===
1982 Haryana Legislative Assembly election: Ballabgarh
Party	Candidate	Votes	%	±%
Independent	Sharda Rani	22,176	34.61	New
INC	Rajinder Singh S/O Gajraj Singh	18,165	28.35	▼4.83
LKD	Subhash Chand	15,103	23.57	New
JP	Raj Dev	5,728	8.94	▼9.48
Independent	Shiv Charan	1,098	1.71	New
Independent	Harchandi	719	1.12	New
Independent	Dharambir Singh	519	0.81	New
Margin of victory		4,011	6.26	▼6.82
Turnout		64,075	69.86	▲0.51
Registered electors		93,359		▲30.19
Independent hold		Swing	▼11.65	

=== Assembly Election 1977 ===
1977 Haryana Legislative Assembly election: Ballabgarh
Party	Candidate	Votes	%	±%
Independent	Rajinder Singh	22,597	46.26	New
INC	Sharda Rani	16,209	33.18	▼14.96
JP	Pritam Singh	8,996	18.41	New
VHP	Tuhi Ram	673	1.38	New
Independent	Suresh Chand	303	0.62	New
Margin of victory		6,388	13.08	▲10.83
Turnout		48,852	69.02	▼2.48
Registered electors		71,710		▼4.01
Independent gain from INC		Swing	▼1.88	

=== Assembly Election 1972 ===
1972 Haryana Legislative Assembly election: Ballabgarh
Party	Candidate	Votes	%	±%
INC	Sharua Rani	25,391	48.14	▲4.04
Independent	Raji Der Singh	24,208	45.90	New
Independent	Ram Singh	2,677	5.08	New
Independent	Nathu Singh	470	0.89	New
Margin of victory		1,183	2.24	▼19.58
Turnout		52,746	72.47	▲17.55
Registered electors		74,704		▲16.61
INC hold		Swing	▲4.04	

=== Assembly Election 1968 ===
1968 Haryana Legislative Assembly election: Ballabgarh
Party	Candidate	Votes	%	±%
INC	Sharda Rani	14,989	44.10	▲7.15
VHP	Nathu Singh	7,572	22.28	New
Independent	Din Dayal	5,922	17.42	New
ABJS	Kanhiya Lal	1,885	5.55	▼12.18
RPI	Sher Singh	1,593	4.69	New
SWA	Adesh Kumar	1,414	4.16	New
Independent	Ram Singh	615	1.81	New
Margin of victory		7,417	21.82	▲16.02
Turnout		33,990	54.18	▼14.79
Registered electors		64,062		▲4.91
INC hold		Swing	▲7.15	

=== Assembly Election 1967 ===
1967 Haryana Legislative Assembly election: Ballabgarh
Party	Candidate	Votes	%	±%
INC	T. Ram	15,308	36.95	New
Independent	S. Singh	12,906	31.15	New
ABJS	R. Singh	7,343	17.72	New
Independent	B. Bhan	5,873	14.18	New
Margin of victory		2,402	5.80	
Turnout		41,430	71.05	
Registered electors		61,061		
INC win (new seat)				

== See also ==
- List of constituencies of the Haryana Legislative Assembly
- Faridabad district
