= Mahender Pratap Singh =

Indian politician

Member of the Haryana Legislative Assembly
- In office 2009–2014
- Constituency: Badkhal
- In office 2005–2009
- Constituency: Mewala Maharajpur
- In office 1982–1996
- Constituency: Mewala Maharajpur

Personal details
- Born: 28 February 1945 (age 80); Faridabad
- Political party: Indian National Congress

Mahender Pratap Singh (born 28 February 1945) is an Indian politician and member of Indian National Congress. Born in a small village (Nawada Koh.) of Faridabad (Haryana), Singh is a graduate of Nehru college. He was elected twice as a Cabinet Minister in Haryana government, five times as an MLA and once Block Samiti Chairman.

== Early life ==
Singh was born on 28 February 1945, at Nawada Koh. to Dalipo Devi and Net Ram Singh. He was married to Rajkali Devi in 1961. Schooling was done from S.D. college, Palwal. Singh was born in an agricultural family, his father was a social activist. Net Ram was elected as the first chairman of Gurgaon (now Gurugram) Zila Parishad of Punjab state. Ram was a renowned Kissan leader of his time. He organised a famous rally of Pt. Jawaharlal Nehru in 1960. He was a founder chairman of government college, Faridabad.

== Political career ==
Singh was elected as Sarpanch in 1966 at the age of 21. He was also elected to Block Samiti in 1972.

Elected as MLA in 1982 with a record win of 22000 votes, in 1987 by 19000 votes, in 1991 from 30000 votes, and in 2005 (63000 votes), 2009 (13000 votes).

He has serves twice as a Cabinet Minister in Haryana Government- 1991–96 (food n supplies.) and second time in 2009–14 (power, industries, labour and employment, local bodies, renewable energy, food supplies, revenue, technical education.)

He remains a leader of congress legislative party from 1987 to 1991.
