= Kailash Prakash =

Member of Parliament, Lok Sabha
- In office 1977-1980
- Preceded by: Shah Nawaz Khan
- Succeeded by: Mohsina Kidwai
- Constituency: Meerut, Uttar Pradesh

Personal details
- Born: 18 December 1908 Parikshat Garh,Meerut district, United Provinces, British India (present-day Uttar Pradesh, India)
- Party: Janata Party

Kailash Prakash was an Indian politician. He was initially a member of the Congress Party and was a supporter and groomed by the elder leader Nirmal Chandra Chaturvedi, MLC. He served as a minister in CB Gupta’s cabinet. He was elected to the Lok Sabha, the lower house of the Parliament of India from the Meerut constituency of Uttar Pradesh as a member of the Janata Party.
