= Mohammed Shahid Akhlaq =

Indian politician

Member of Parliament, 14th Lok Sabha
- In office May 2004 - May 2009
- Preceded by: Avtar Singh Bhadana
- Succeeded by: Rajendra Agrawal
- Constituency: Meerut

Personal details
- Born: 12 December 1969 (age 56) Meerut, Uttar Pradesh, India
- Party: Bahujan Samaj Party
- Education: Faiz-e-aam Inter College, Meerut

Mohammed Shahid Akhlaq (born 12 December 1969) is an Indian politician, and a former member of the Indian Parliament from Meerut, Uttar Pradesh. He is a member of the Bahujan Samaj Party.

He completed his education only till 6th grade and did not study further. His wealth according to nomination filings is 402 crores.

His son Danish Akhlaq was arrested by police in 2018 for sexual assault against a woman he befriended on Instagram.
