= Faridabad Assembly constituency =

Constituency of the Haryana legislative assembly in India

Coordinates: 28.410°N 77.336°E

- Constituency No. 89 for the Haryana Legislative Assembly

Constituency details
- Country: India
- Region: North India
- State: Haryana
- District: Faridabad
- Lok Sabha constituency: Faridabad
- Established: 1967
- Total electors: 2,64,037
- Reservation: None

Member of Legislative Assembly
- 15th Haryana Legislative Assembly
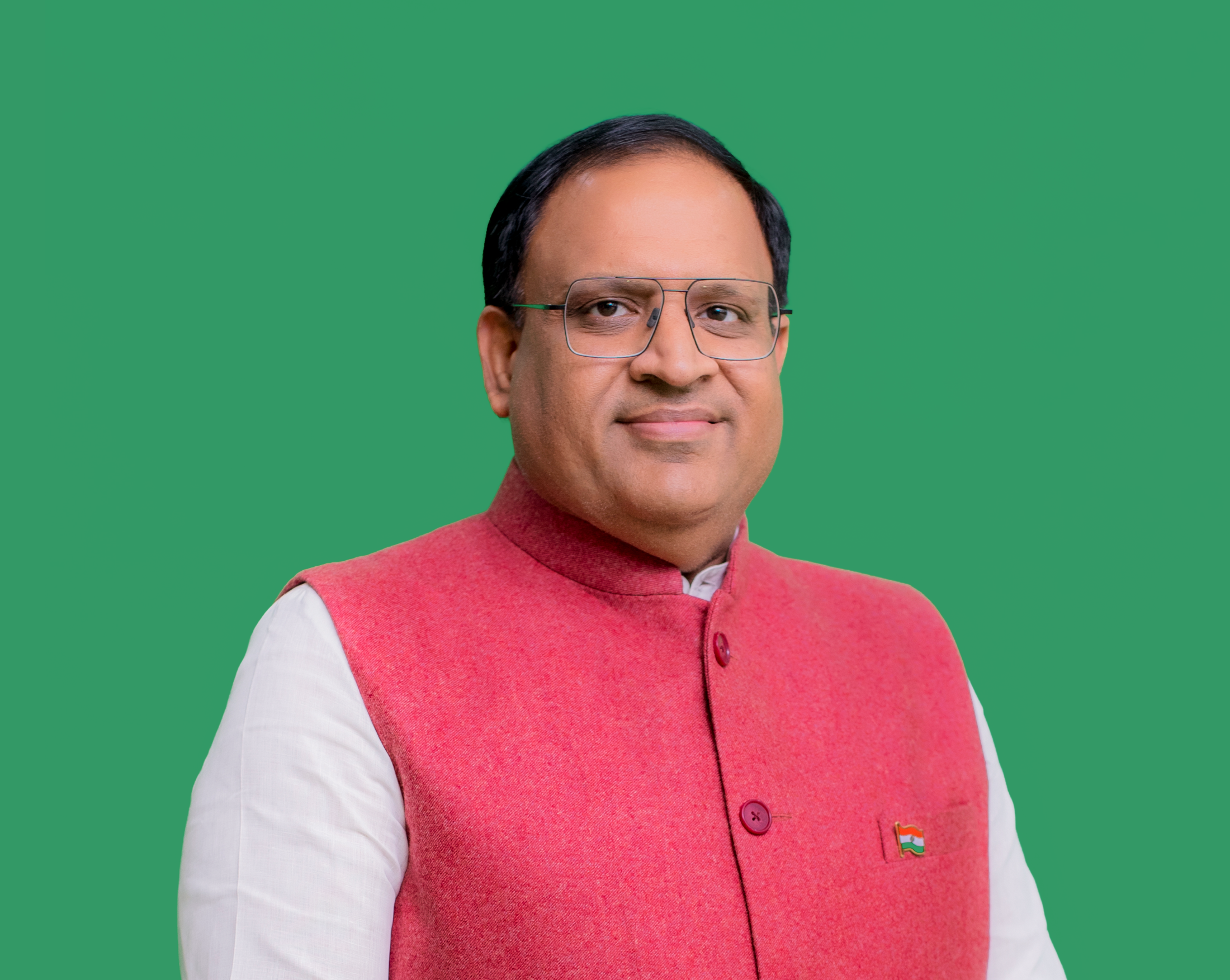
- Incumbent Vipul Goel
- Party: BJP
- Elected year: 2024

Faridabad Assembly constituency is one of the 90 constituencies in the Haryana Legislative Assembly of Haryana, a northern state of India. Faridabad is also part of Faridabad Lok Sabha constituency.

== Members of Legislative Assembly ==
| Year | Member | Party |
|---|---|---|
| 1967 | K. D. Kapil | Indian National Congress |
| 1968 | Kamal Dev | Indian National Congress |
| 1972 | Kanwalnain Gulati | Independent |
| 1977 | Deep Chand Bhatia | Janata Party |
| 1982 | Aikagar Chand Chaudhry | Indian National Congress |
| 1987 | Kundan Lal Bhatia | Bharatiya Janata Party |
| 1991 | Aikagar Chand Chaudhry | Indian National Congress |
| 1996 | Chander Bhatia | Bharatiya Janata Party |
| 2000 | Chander Bhatia | Bharatiya Janata Party |
| 2005 | Aikagar Chand Chaudhry | Indian National Congress |
| 2009 | Anand Kaushik | Indian National Congress |
| 2014 | Vipul Goel | Bharatiya Janata Party |
| 2019 | Narender Gupta | Bharatiya Janata Party |
| 2024 | Vipul Goel | Bharatiya Janata Party |

== Election results ==
=== Assembly Election 2024 ===
2024 Haryana Legislative Assembly election: Faridabad
| Party | Candidate | Votes | % | ±% |
|---|---|---|---|---|
| BJP | Vipul Goel | 93,651 | 65.45 | ▲11.04 |
| INC | Lakhan Kumar Singla | 45,263 | 31.63 | ▼4.84 |
| AAP | Pravesh Mehta | 926 | 0.65 | ▼0.55 |
| INLD | Narender Pal Singh Baghel | 859 | 0.60 | New |
| NOTA | None of the Above | 1,025 | 0.72 | ▼0.73 |
| Margin of victory | | 48,388 | 33.82 | ▲15.89 |
| Turnout | | 1,43,087 | 53.82 | ▲4.28 |
| Registered electors | | 2,64,037 | | ▲8.76 |
| BJP hold | | Swing | ▲11.04 | |

=== Assembly Election 2019 ===
2019 Haryana Legislative Assembly election: Faridabad
| Party | Candidate | Votes | % | ±% |
|---|---|---|---|---|
| BJP | Narender Gupta | 65,887 | 54.41 | ▼6.07 |
| INC | Lakhan Kumar Singla | 44,174 | 36.48 | ▲13.26 |
| JJP | Kuldeep Tewatia | 4,045 | 3.34 | New |
| BSP | Mahesh Chand Jain | 2,776 | 2.29 | ▼1.91 |
| NOTA | Nota | 1,754 | 1.45 | ▲0.59 |
| AAP | Kumari Suman Lata Vashisth | 1,445 | 1.19 | New |
| Margin of victory | | 21,713 | 17.93 | ▼19.33 |
| Turnout | | 1,21,102 | 49.54 | ▼10.39 |
| Registered electors | | 2,44,444 | | ▲21.89 |
| BJP hold | | Swing | ▼6.07 | |

=== Assembly Election 2014 ===
2014 Haryana Legislative Assembly election: Faridabad
| Party | Candidate | Votes | % | ±% |
|---|---|---|---|---|
| BJP | Vipul Goel | 72,679 | 60.47 | ▲29.82 |
| INC | Anand Kaushik | 27,898 | 23.21 | ▼21.95 |
| INLD | Parvesh Mehta | 12,237 | 10.18 | ▲4.57 |
| BSP | Satvir Singh Chandeela | 5,052 | 4.20 | ▼1.93 |
| NOTA | None of the Above | 1,031 | 0.86 | New |
| Margin of victory | | 44,781 | 37.26 | ▲22.75 |
| Turnout | | 1,20,186 | 59.93 | ▲3.73 |
| Registered electors | | 2,00,538 | | ▲50.83 |
| BJP gain from INC | | Swing | ▲15.31 | |

=== Assembly Election 2009 ===
2009 Haryana Legislative Assembly election: Faridabad
| Party | Candidate | Votes | % | ±% |
|---|---|---|---|---|
| INC | Anand Kaushik | 33,744 | 45.16 | ▼17.49 |
| BJP | Parvesh Mehta | 22,903 | 30.65 | ▲7.09 |
| Independent | Basant Virmani | 8,160 | 10.92 | New |
| BSP | Shyam Bhadana | 4,584 | 6.14 | ▲2.79 |
| INLD | Sumesh Chandila | 4,190 | 5.61 | ▲0.64 |
| Independent | Sanjeev Chandela | 476 | 0.64 | New |
| Margin of victory | | 10,841 | 14.51 | ▼24.58 |
| Turnout | | 74,716 | 56.20 | ▲4.12 |
| Registered electors | | 1,32,953 | | ▼48.84 |
| INC hold | | Swing | ▼17.49 | |

=== Assembly Election 2005 ===
2005 Haryana Legislative Assembly election: Faridabad
| Party | Candidate | Votes | % | ±% |
|---|---|---|---|---|
| INC | Akagar Chand Chaudhry | 84,788 | 62.66 | ▲28.72 |
| BJP | Chander Bhatia | 31,893 | 23.57 | ▼26.45 |
| INLD | Attar Singh | 6,717 | 4.96 | New |
| BSP | Kc Chhokar | 4,532 | 3.35 | ▼5.13 |
| JJJKM | Ved Prakash Yadav | 2,796 | 2.07 | New |
| Independent | Nathuni Ojha | 913 | 0.67 | New |
| Independent | Harsh Bhatia | 703 | 0.52 | New |
| Margin of victory | | 52,895 | 39.09 | ▲23.01 |
| Turnout | | 1,35,324 | 52.07 | ▲0.70 |
| Registered electors | | 2,59,874 | | ▲19.23 |
| INC gain from BJP | | Swing | ▲12.63 | |

=== Assembly Election 2000 ===
2000 Haryana Legislative Assembly election: Faridabad
| Party | Candidate | Votes | % | ±% |
|---|---|---|---|---|
| BJP | Chander Bhatia | 56,008 | 50.02 | ▲0.71 |
| INC | Akagar Chand Chaudhry | 38,002 | 33.94 | ▲11.59 |
| BSP | Liyaket Ali | 9,491 | 8.48 | ▲1.53 |
| Independent | Subedar Suman | 5,201 | 4.65 | New |
| Independent | Hari Ram | 1,334 | 1.19 | New |
| SP | Mange Ram | 1,057 | 0.94 | New |
| Margin of victory | | 18,006 | 16.08 | ▼10.88 |
| Turnout | | 1,11,968 | 51.37 | ▼1.75 |
| Registered electors | | 2,17,957 | | ▼9.27 |
| BJP hold | | Swing | ▲0.71 | |

=== Assembly Election 1996 ===
1996 Haryana Legislative Assembly election: Faridabad
| Party | Candidate | Votes | % | ±% |
|---|---|---|---|---|
| BJP | Chander Bhatia | 62,925 | 49.31 | ▲26.06 |
| INC | Akagar Chand Chaudhry | 28,518 | 22.35 | ▼24.04 |
| SAP | Gobind Ram | 10,419 | 8.16 | New |
| BSP | Dausi Ram | 8,865 | 6.95 | ▲4.87 |
| CPI | Bechu Giri | 4,149 | 3.25 | New |
| Independent | Surendra | 3,652 | 2.86 | New |
| AIIC(T) | Radha W/O Amar Nath | 1,320 | 1.03 | New |
| Independent | Md. Aftab | 999 | 0.78 | New |
| Independent | Jagdish | 945 | 0.74 | New |
| Margin of victory | | 34,407 | 26.96 | ▲3.83 |
| Turnout | | 1,27,606 | 54.70 | ▼1.82 |
| Registered electors | | 2,40,220 | | ▲33.41 |
| BJP gain from INC | | Swing | ▲2.92 | |

=== Assembly Election 1991 ===
1991 Haryana Legislative Assembly election: Faridabad
| Party | Candidate | Votes | % | ±% |
|---|---|---|---|---|
| INC | Akagar Chand Chaudhry | 45,896 | 46.39 | ▲4.88 |
| BJP | Chander Bhatia | 23,006 | 23.25 | ▼20.94 |
| Independent | Gobind Ram Nain | 22,260 | 22.50 | New |
| HVP | Laj Wanti | 2,159 | 2.18 | New |
| BSP | Ram Ji Lal | 2,056 | 2.08 | New |
| JP | Ram Kumar Malhotra | 1,183 | 1.20 | ▲0.65 |
| Margin of victory | | 22,890 | 23.14 | ▲20.46 |
| Turnout | | 98,931 | 56.55 | ▼6.95 |
| Registered electors | | 1,80,067 | | ▲13.29 |
| INC gain from BJP | | Swing | ▲2.20 | |

=== Assembly Election 1987 ===
1987 Haryana Legislative Assembly election: Faridabad
| Party | Candidate | Votes | % | ±% |
|---|---|---|---|---|
| BJP | Kundan Lal Bhatia S/O Arjun Lal | 43,475 | 44.20 | ▲11.62 |
| INC | Akagar Chand Chaudhry | 40,838 | 41.51 | ▼7.95 |
| Independent | Jagan Nath Gautam | 6,344 | 6.45 | New |
| CPI(M) | Mohan Lal | 2,246 | 2.28 | New |
| CPI | Bechu Giri | 1,520 | 1.55 | New |
| Independent | Pratap Singh | 691 | 0.70 | New |
| JP | Manohar Lal Banga | 535 | 0.54 | New |
| Margin of victory | | 2,637 | 2.68 | ▼14.21 |
| Turnout | | 98,370 | 62.95 | ▲0.13 |
| Registered electors | | 1,58,948 | | ▲38.80 |
| BJP gain from INC | | Swing | ▼5.27 | |

=== Assembly Election 1982 ===
1982 Haryana Legislative Assembly election: Faridabad
| Party | Candidate | Votes | % | ±% |
|---|---|---|---|---|
| INC | Akagar Chand Chaudhry | 34,983 | 49.46 | ▲20.42 |
| BJP | Kundan Lal | 23,039 | 32.57 | New |
| Independent | Ghan Shyam | 6,116 | 8.65 | New |
| Independent | Kanwal Nath Gulati | 3,855 | 5.45 | New |
| Independent | Ramji Lal | 805 | 1.14 | New |
| Independent | Bhai Lal | 448 | 0.63 | New |
| Margin of victory | | 11,944 | 16.89 | ▲3.16 |
| Turnout | | 70,728 | 62.59 | ▲6.40 |
| Registered electors | | 1,14,517 | | ▲45.22 |
| INC gain from JP | | Swing | ▲6.69 | |

=== Assembly Election 1977 ===
1977 Haryana Legislative Assembly election: Faridabad
| Party | Candidate | Votes | % | ±% |
|---|---|---|---|---|
| JP | Deep Chand Bhatia | 18,671 | 42.77 | New |
| INC | Akagar Chand Chaudhry | 12,680 | 29.05 | ▼5.56 |
| CPI | Rati Ram | 4,993 | 11.44 | ▼2.00 |
| Independent | Kanwal Nath Gulati | 1,514 | 3.47 | New |
| VHP | Bhulley Singh | 1,336 | 3.06 | New |
| Independent | Baldev Raj Ojha | 1,205 | 2.76 | New |
| Independent | Radha Bai Sachdeva | 886 | 2.03 | New |
| Independent | Kailash Chander Mayar | 761 | 1.74 | New |
| RPI | Bhim Rao | 554 | 1.27 | New |
| Independent | Uma | 422 | 0.97 | New |
| Independent | Aidal Singh Kanwar | 237 | 0.54 | New |
| Margin of victory | | 5,991 | 13.72 | ▲2.24 |
| Turnout | | 43,656 | 56.03 | ▼3.08 |
| Registered electors | | 78,860 | | ▼19.84 |
| JP gain from Independent | | Swing | ▼3.32 | |

=== Assembly Election 1972 ===
1972 Haryana Legislative Assembly election: Faridabad
| Party | Candidate | Votes | % | ±% |
|---|---|---|---|---|
| Independent | Kanwal Nath Gulati | 26,498 | 46.09 | New |
| INC | Kamadev Kapil | 19,895 | 34.60 | ▲7.04 |
| CPI | Nazar Mohd. | 7,727 | 13.44 | ▲5.25 |
| Independent | Gajinder Pal | 2,032 | 3.53 | New |
| Independent | Shankar Lal | 882 | 1.53 | New |
| ABJS | Deep Chand Bhatia | 458 | 0.80 | ▼12.41 |
| Margin of victory | | 6,603 | 11.49 | ▲7.02 |
| Turnout | | 57,492 | 59.94 | ▲6.73 |
| Registered electors | | 98,377 | | ▲40.45 |
| Independent gain from INC | | Swing | ▲18.53 | |

=== Assembly Election 1968 ===
1968 Haryana Legislative Assembly election: Faridabad
| Party | Candidate | Votes | % | ±% |
|---|---|---|---|---|
| INC | Kamal Dev | 9,982 | 27.56 | ▼4.37 |
| Independent | Kanwal Nath Gulati | 8,365 | 23.10 | New |
| Independent | Ganga Lal | 4,912 | 13.56 | New |
| ABJS | Rattan Lal | 4,782 | 13.20 | ▲6.21 |
| Independent | Girdhari Singh | 4,329 | 11.95 | New |
| CPI | Udhe Bhan | 2,967 | 8.19 | ▼1.47 |
| Independent | Budh Singh | 669 | 1.85 | New |
| Independent | Roshan Lal | 213 | 0.59 | New |
| Margin of victory | | 1,617 | 4.46 | ▼9.82 |
| Turnout | | 36,219 | 52.87 | ▼9.33 |
| Registered electors | | 70,045 | | ▲4.71 |
| INC hold | | Swing | ▼4.37 | |

=== Assembly Election 1967 ===
1967 Haryana Legislative Assembly election: Faridabad
| Party | Candidate | Votes | % | ±% |
|---|---|---|---|---|
| INC | K. D. Kapil | 13,037 | 31.93 | New |
| Independent | K. Kumar | 7,206 | 17.65 | New |
| Independent | K. Gulati | 6,591 | 16.14 | New |
| CPI | S. Loomba | 3,944 | 9.66 | New |
| RPI | T. Singh | 3,284 | 8.04 | New |
| ABJS | D. D. Verma | 2,856 | 7.00 | New |
| Independent | A. Nath | 1,650 | 4.04 | New |
| Independent | K. L. Sharma | 1,298 | 3.18 | New |
| Independent | S. Lal | 518 | 1.27 | New |
| Independent | R. Lal | 444 | 1.09 | New |
| Margin of victory | | 5,831 | 14.28 | |
| Turnout | | 40,828 | 64.98 | |
| Registered electors | | 66,894 | | |
| INC win (new seat) | | | | |

== See also ==
- Faridabad
- Faridabad district
- List of constituencies of Haryana Legislative Assembly
