= Tigaon Assembly constituency =

Constituency of the Haryana legislative assembly in India

Coordinates: 28.35°N 77.40°E

- Constituency No. 90 for the Haryana Legislative Assembly

Constituency details
- Country: India
- Region: North India
- State: Haryana
- District: Faridabad
- Lok Sabha constituency: Faridabad
- Established: 2009
- Total electors: 3,71,248
- Reservation: None

Member of Legislative Assembly
- 15th Haryana Legislative Assembly
- Incumbent Rajesh Nagar
- Party: BJP
- Elected year: 2024

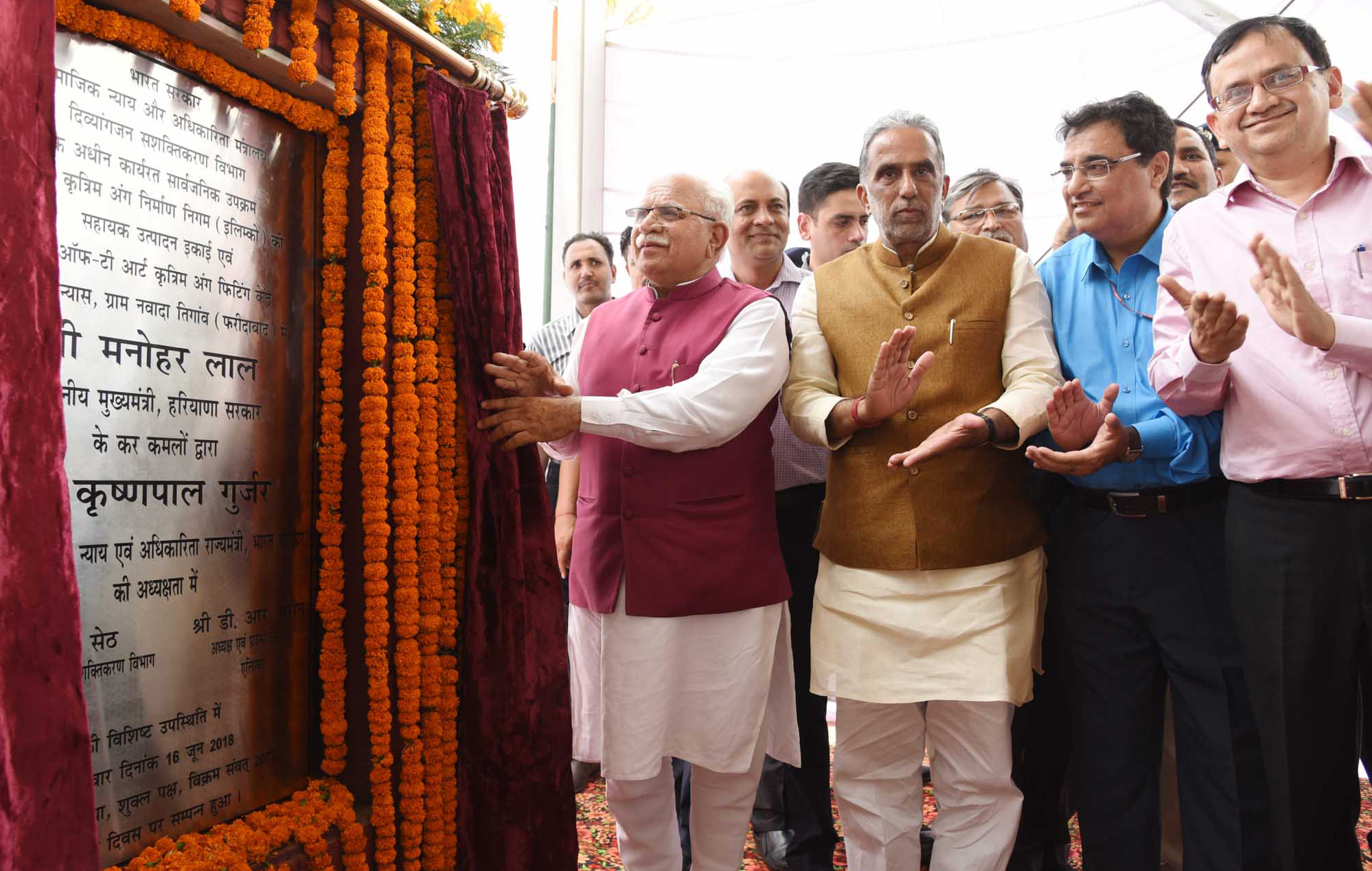
Manohar Lal Khattar unveiling the plaque to lay the foundation stone for “Auxiliary Production Unit and State-of-the-Art Artificial Limbs Fitting Centre” of Artificial Limbs Manufacturing Corporation of India at Tigaon

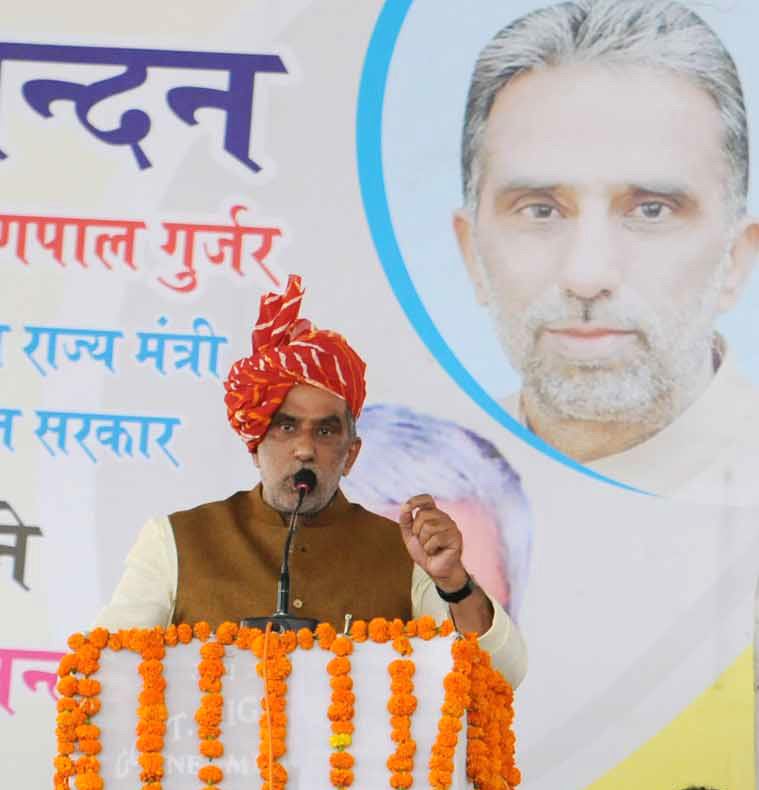
Krishan Pal giving the address at the foundation stone laying ceremony of “Auxiliary Production Unit and State-of-the-Art Artificial Limbs Fitting Centre” at Tigaon

Tigaon Assembly constituency is a Haryana Legislative Assembly constituency in Faridabad, Haryana.

== Members of Legislative Assembly ==
Year	Member	Party
Till 2009: Constituency did not exist
2009	Krishan Pal Gurjar	Bharatiya Janata Party
2014	Lalit Nagar	Indian National Congress
2019	Rajesh Nagar	Bharatiya Janata Party
2024	Rajesh Nagar	Bharatiya Janata Party

== Election results ==
=== Assembly Election 2024 ===
2024 Haryana Legislative Assembly election: Tigaon
Party	Candidate	Votes	%	±%
BJP	Rajesh Nagar	94,229	46.26%	▼11.13
Independent	Lalit Nagar	56,828	27.90%	New
INC	Rohit Nagar	21,656	10.63%	▼26.76
Independent	Girraj Sharma	11,808	5.80%	New
AAP	Abhash Chandela	5,669	2.78%	New
Kisan Mazdoor Sangharsh Party	Shiv Narayan Dubey	3,977	1.95%	New
BSP	Lal Chand Sharma	3,686	1.81%	New
NOTA	None of the Above	1,859	0.91%	▼0.01
Margin of victory		37,401	18.36%	▼1.63
Turnout		2,03,714	54.40%	▼1.39
Registered electors		3,71,248		▲23.42
BJP hold		Swing	▼11.13	

=== Assembly Election 2019 ===
2019 Haryana Legislative Assembly election: Tigaon
Party	Candidate	Votes	%	±%
BJP	Rajesh Nagar	97,126	57.38	▲22.21
INC	Lalit Nagar	63,285	37.39	▲0.25
JJP	Pardeep Chaudhary	2,693	1.59	New
NOTA	Nota	1,569	0.93	▲0.25
Margin of victory		33,841	19.99	▲18.02
Turnout		1,69,263	55.79	▼10.28
Registered electors		3,03,389		▲34.36
BJP gain from INC		Swing	▲20.24	

=== Assembly Election 2014 ===
2014 Haryana Legislative Assembly election: Tigaon
Party	Candidate	Votes	%	±%
INC	Lalit Nagar	55,408	37.14	▼7.54
BJP	Rajesh Nagar	52,470	35.17	▼10.45
BSP	Girraj	29,568	19.82	New
INLD	Arvind Bhardwaj	5,730	3.84	▲2.52
Independent	Birpal Gujjar	2,521	1.69	New
NOTA	None of the Above	1,009	0.68	New
Independent	Nahar Singh Chauhan	906	0.61	New
Margin of victory		2,938	1.97	▲1.03
Turnout		1,49,187	66.07	▲1.73
Registered electors		2,25,811		▲66.73
INC gain from BJP		Swing	▼8.48	

=== Assembly Election 2009 ===
2009 Haryana Legislative Assembly election: Tigaon
Party	Candidate	Votes	%	±%
BJP	Krishan Pal Gurjar	39,746	45.62	New
INC	Lalit Nagar	38,928	44.68	New
Independent	Girraj Sharma	4,218	4.84	New
SP	Raj Kishore	1,490	1.71	New
INLD	Rajender Kumar	1,155	1.33	New
Independent	Sandeep	684	0.79	New
HJC(BL)	Gyanender	555	0.64	New
Margin of victory		818	0.94	
Turnout		87,132	64.33	
Registered electors		1,35,437		
BJP win (new seat)				
