= Narender Gupta =

Indian politician

Narender Gupta is an Indian politician. He was elected to the Haryana Legislative Assembly from Faridabad in the 2019 Haryana Legislative Assembly election as a member of the Bharatiya Janata Party.
