= Rajesh Nagar =

Indian politician

Minister of Food, Civil Supplies & Consumer Affairs, Government of Haryana
- Incumbent
- Assumed office 17 October 2024
- Chief Minister: Nayab Singh Saini
- Preceded by: Mool Chand Sharma

Member of Haryana Legislative Assembly
- Incumbent
- Assumed office 2019
- Preceded by: Lalit Nagar
- Constituency: Tigaon Assembly constituency

Personal details
- Party: Bharatiya Janata Party

Rajesh Nagar is an Indian politician. He was elected to the Haryana Legislative Assembly from Tigaon (Vidhan Sabha constituency) in the 2019 Haryana Legislative Assembly election as a member of the Bharatiya Janata Party. His father is Rup Singh Nagar. He won the 2024 Assembly election again defeating veteran leader Ex MLA Lalit Nagar by the margin of 37401 votes. He became minister (Independent charge) in Nayab Saini cabinet.
