= Meerut Cantonment Assembly constituency =

Constituency of Uttar Pradesh, India

Meerut Cantt.
- Constituency No. 47 for the Uttar Pradesh Legislative Assembly

Constituency details
- Country: India
- Region: North India
- State: Uttar Pradesh
- District: Meerut
- Established: 1956
- Total electors: 4,19,362 (2019)
- Reservation: None

Member of Legislative Assembly
- 18th Uttar Pradesh Legislative Assembly
- Incumbent Amit Agarwal
- Party: Bharatiya Janata Party
- Alliance: NDA
- Elected year: 2022

Meerut Cantt. Assembly constituency is one of the 403 constituencies of the Uttar Pradesh Legislative Assembly, India. It is a part of the Meerut district and one of the five assembly constituencies in the Meerut Lok Sabha constituency. First election in this assembly constituency was held in 1957 after the "DPACO (1956)" order was passed and the constituency was constituted in 1956. The constituency was assigned identification number 47 after the "Delimitation of Parliamentary and Assembly Constituencies Order, 2008" was passed. In 1991 elections were not held in this constituency.

== Wards / Areas ==
Extent of Meerut Cantt. Assembly constituency is Meerut (CB) & Ward Nos. 1, 6 to 9, 18, 23, 26, 30, 32, 37, 40, 44, 52, 59, 61, 63, 64, 66, 67 & 70 in Meerut (M Corp.) of Meerut Tehsil.

== Members of the Legislative Assembly ==
Year	Member	Party
1957	Prakashwati Sood	Indian National Congress
1962	Prakashwati Sood	Indian National Congress
1967	V. Tyagi	Samyukta Socialist Party
1969	Uma Datt Sharma	Indian National Congress
1974	Ajit Singh Sethi	Indian National Congress
1977	Ajit Singh Sethi	Indian National Congress
1980	Ajit Singh Sethi	Indian National Congress (I)
1985	Ajit Singh Sethi	Indian National Congress
1989	Pramatma Sharan Mittal	Bharatiya Janata Party
1991	–	
1993	Amit Agarwal	Bharatiya Janata Party
1996	Amit Agarwal	Bharatiya Janata Party
2002	Satya Prakash Agarwal	Bharatiya Janata Party
2007	Satya Prakash Agarwal	Bharatiya Janata Party
2012	Satya Prakash Agarwal	Bharatiya Janata Party
2017	Satya Prakash Agarwal	Bharatiya Janata Party
2022	Amit Agarwal	Bharatiya Janata Party

== Election results ==
=== 2027 ===
2027 Uttar Pradesh Legislative Assembly election: Meerut Cantonment
Party	Candidate	Votes	%	±%
INDIA				
NDA				
BSP				
NOTA	None of the above			
Majority				
Turnout				
gain from		Swing		

=== 2022 ===
2022 Uttar Pradesh Legislative Assembly election: Meerut Cantonment
Party	Candidate	Votes	%	±%
BJP	Amit Agarwal	162,032	66.27	+10.34
RLD	Manisha Ahlawat	43,960	17.98	+16.35
BSP	Amit Sharma	28,519	11.66	−11.93
INC	Avnish Kajla	5,096	2.08	−14.66
NOTA	None of the above	1,075	0.44	−0.03
Majority		118,072	48.29	+15.95
Turnout		244,493	56.84	−2.12
BJP hold		Swing		

=== 2017 ===
U. P. Legislative Assembly Election, 2017: Meerut Cantonment
Party	Candidate	Votes	%	±%
BJP	Satya Prakash Agarwal	132,518	55.93	
BSP	Satendra Solanki	55,899	23.59	
INC	Ramesh Dhingra	39,650	16.74	
RLD	Sanjeev Dhama	3,851	1.63	
NOTA	None of the above	1,110	0.47	
Majority		76,619	32.34	
Turnout		236,926	58.96	
BJP hold		Swing	+21.07	

=== 2012 ===
U. P. Legislative Assembly Election, 2012: Meerut Cantt.
Party	Candidate	Votes	%	±%
BJP	Satya Prakash Agarwal	70,820	34.86	
BSP	Sunil Kumar Wadhwa	67,207	33.08	
INC	Ramesh Dhingra	44,659	21.98	
SP	Anil Kumar	9,699	4.77	
IND.	Manjeet Singh Kochher	1,729	0.85	
Margin of victory		3,613	1.78	
Turnout		2,03,150	58.59	
BJP hold		Swing		

== See also ==
- Meerut Lok Sabha constituency
- Meerut district
- Sixteenth Legislative Assembly of Uttar Pradesh
- Uttar Pradesh Legislative Assembly
