= Gufran =

Gufran or Ghufran may refer to:

- Ghufran, forgiveness in Islam
- Ghufran Azam, Indian politician
- Dildar Ali Naseerabadi, known as Ghufran Ma'ab Naseerabadi, Indian islamic scholar
  - Imambara Ghufran Ma'ab, an Islamic congregation hall founded by the scholar
- Gufran-Ullah Beig, Indian meteorologist

== See also ==
- Risalat al-Ghufran or The Epistle of Forgiveness, a satirical work of Arabic poetry written by Abu al-ʿAlaʾ al-Maʿarri around 1033
