= Parvez Haleem =

Indian politician

Parvez Haleem Khan is Indian politician, member of Janata Dal and Bharatiya Kranti Dal, representative of Kithore (Assembly constituency), 10th Legislative Assembly of Uttar Pradesh and 13th Legislative Assembly of Uttar Pradesh.
