= Rafiq Ansari =

Indian politician

Member of the Uttar Pradesh Legislative Assembly
- Incumbent
- Assumed office 11 March 2017
- Preceded by: Laxmikant Bajpai
- Constituency: Meerut

Personal details
- Born: 5 November 1962 (age 63) Meerut, Uttar Pradesh, India
- Party: Samajwadi Party
- Spouse: Khursheeda
- Children: 7
- Parent: M.Yaseen
- Education: Class 8th

Rafiq Ansari (born 5 November 1962) is an Indian politician affiliated with the Samajwadi Party (SP). He is a Member of Legislative Assembly (MLA) from Meerut (Assembly constituency) of Uttar Pradesh.

== Education ==
Rafiq Ansari is 8th pass and hasn't done any studies further.
