= Amit Agarwal (politician) =

Indian politician

Member of the Uttar Pradesh Legislative Assembly
- Incumbent
- Assumed office 10 March 2022

Personal details
- Party: Bharatiya Janata Party
- Other political affiliations: Samajwadi Party

Amit Agarwal (born 23 Feb 1954) is an Indian politician. He is Member of the Uttar Pradesh Legislative Assembly from the Meerut Cantonment Assembly constituency representing the largest party of Uttar Pradesh, Bharatiya Janata Party. He is known to be the richest MLA candidate in 2022 Uttar Pradesh Legislative Assembly election.
