= Mohsina Kidwai =

Indian politician (1932–2026)

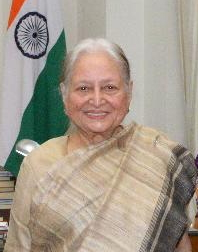
- Kidwai in 2017

Union Minister of Urban Development
- In office 22 October 1986 – 2 September 1989
- Prime Minister: Rajiv Gandhi
- Preceded by: Abdul Ghafoor
- Succeeded by: Murasoli Maran

Union Minister of Transport
- In office 24 June 1986 – 22 October 1986
- Prime Minister: Rajiv Gandhi
- Preceded by: Rajiv Gandhi
- Succeeded by: Ministry abolished

Union Minister of Health and Family Welfare
- In office 31 December 1984 – 24 June 1986
- Prime Minister: Rajiv Gandhi
- Preceded by: B. Shankaranand
- Succeeded by: P. V. Narasimha Rao

Union Minister of Rural Development
- In office 2 August 1984 – 31 December 1984 (Minister of State, Independent charge until 31 October 1984)
- Preceded by: Harinath Misra
- Succeeded by: Buta Singh

Member of Parliament, Rajya Sabha
- In office 30 June 2004 – 29 June 2016
- Succeeded by: Chhaya Verma
- Constituency: Chhattisgarh

Member of Parliament, Lok Sabha for Meerut
- In office 1977–1989

Personal details
- Born: 1 January 1932 Barabanki, United Provinces of Agra and Oudh, British India
- Died: 8 April 2026 (aged 94)
- Party: Indian National Congress
- Spouse: Khalil R. Kidwai
- Children: Three daughters
- Website: Official Website, Rajya Sabha

Mohsina Kidwai (1 January 1932 – 8 April 2026) was an Indian politician and parliamentarian. Kidwai was from the Barabanki district of Uttar Pradesh, and was a member of the Indian National Congress. She served as a union minister under Prime Ministers Indira Gandhi and Rajiv Gandhi holding several important portfolios.

Kidwai was elected to the 6th Lok Sabha from the Meerut constituency of Uttar Pradesh and retained the seat in the 7th and 8th Lok Sabha. She also served as a member of the Rajya Sabha from Chhattisgarh^{,} between 2004 and 2016.

== Career ==
Kidwai held several ministerial offices in the Government of Uttar Pradesh and the Government of India.

She held a variety of leadership positions within the Congress party including General Secretary of AICC. Kidwai was known for her proximity to Congress Party Chief, Sonia Gandhi.

Kidwai was also a member of Congress Working Committee and convenor of Manifesto Implementation Committees of Assam and Punjab.

== Personal life and death ==
Kidwai was married on 17 December 1953 to Khalil R. Kidwai. She had three daughters.

Kidwai died on 8 April 2026, at the age of 94.

== Positions held ==
Kidwai held the following positions during her career:

Position held	From	To
Member, Uttar Pradesh Legislative Council	1960	1974
Minister of State, Food, Civil Supplies, Government of Uttar Pradesh	1973	1974
Member, Uttar Pradesh Legislative Assembly	1974	1977
Cabinet Minister for Harijan, Social Welfare, Government of Uttar Pradesh	1974	1975
Cabinet Minister for Small Scale Industries, Government of Uttar Pradesh	1975	1977
Member, Sixth Lok Sabha, won bypoll from Azamgarh	1978	1979
Member, Seventh Lok Sabha, from Meerut	1980	1984
Union Minister of State for Labour and Rehabilitation	11 September 1982	29 January 1983
Union Minister of State for Health and Family Welfare	29 January 1983	2 August 1984
Member, Eighth Lok Sabha	1984	1989
Union Minister of State (Independent charge)	2 August 1984	31 October 1984
Union Cabinet Minister of Rural Development	4 November 1984	31 December 1984
Union Cabinet Minister of Health and Family Welfare	31 December 1984	24 June 1986
Union Cabinet Minister of Transport	24 June 1986	22 October 1986
Union Cabinet Minister of Urban Development	22 October 1986	2 December 1989
Union Cabinet Minister of Tourism (additional charge)	14 February 1988	25 June 1989
Elected to Rajya Sabha	June 2004	–
Member, Court of the Aligarh Muslim University	July 2004	–
Member, Committee on Agriculture	August 2004	–
Member, Anjuman (Court) of Jamia Millia Islamia University	November 2004	–
Member, Consultative Committee for the Ministry of Social Justice, Empowerment	October 2004	–
Member, Parliamentary Forum on Population Public Health	May 2006	–
Member, Committee on Food, Consumer Affairs Public Distribution	July 2006	–
