= Uttarakhand Ayurved University =

State university in Uttarakhand, India

- Type: Public
- Established: 2009; 17 years ago
- Affiliations: UGC
- Chancellor: Governor of Uttarakhand
- Vice-Chancellor: Dr. Arun Kumar Tripathi
- Location: Dehradun, Uttarakhand, India
- Website: www.uau.ac.in

Uttarakhand Ayurved University is a public state university located at Dehradun, Uttarakhand, India. It was established in 2009 by the Government of Uttarakhand through the Uttarakhand Ayurved University Act, 2009. It focuses on teaching and research of Ayurveda, as well as other areas of AYUSH (Ayurveda, yoga, naturopathy, Unani, Siddha medicine and homoeopathy). Sunil Kumar Joshi was appointed vice chancellor in 2020.

== Campuses and affiliated colleges ==
Other than its main campus in Dehradun the university also has two campuses in Haridwar. It has 16 affiliated colleges including 13 Ayurveda colleges, two homeopathic colleges and one Unani college.
