= Seema Trikha =

Indian politician

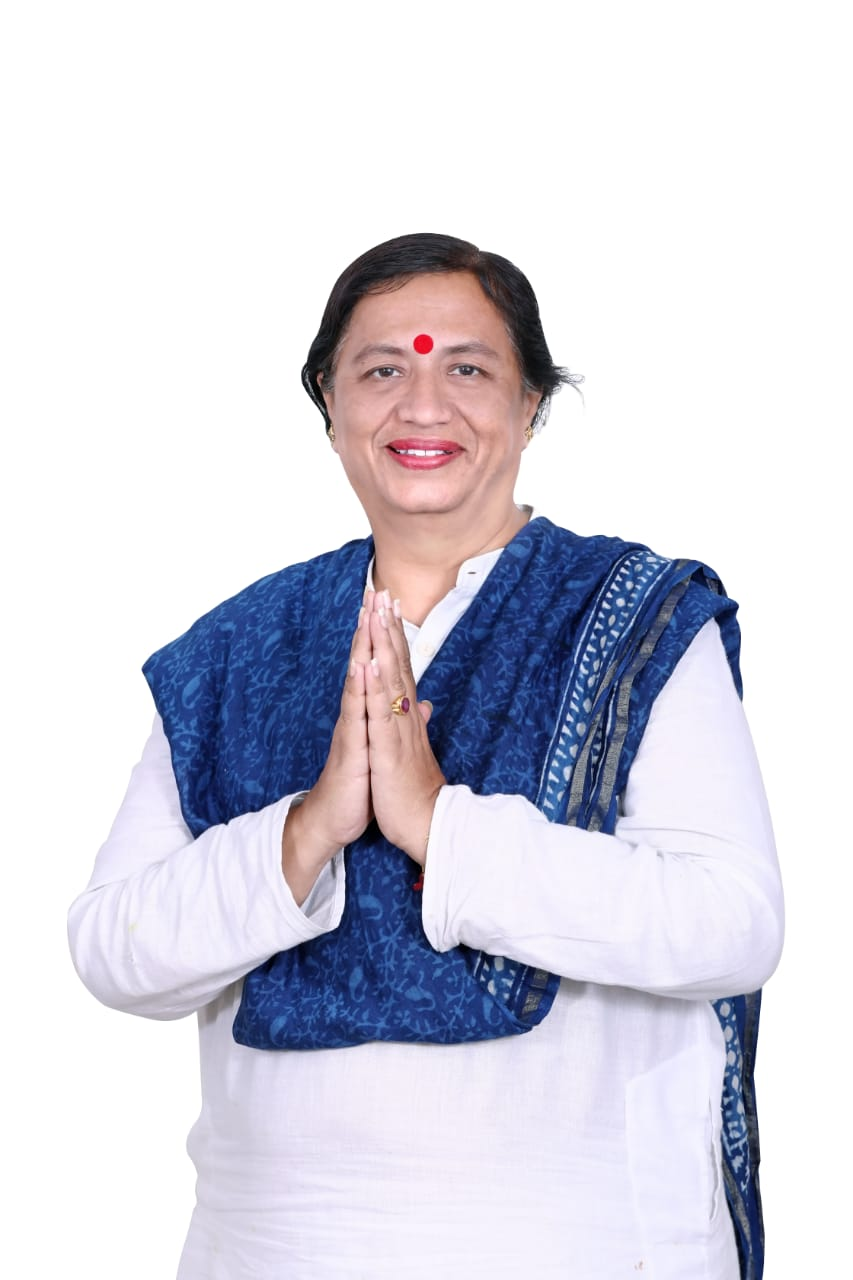

Seema Trikha (born 31 August 1966) is an Indian politician from Haryana and a former member of Haryana Legislative Assembly. She won the 2014 Haryana Legislative Assembly election from the Badkhal Vidhan Sabha constituency in Faridabad representing Bharatiya Janata Party.

== See also ==
- Haryana Legislative Assembly
- Manohar Lal Khattar
- Politics of Haryana
