= Mool Chand Sharma =

Indian politician

Member of the Haryana Legislative Assembly
- Incumbent
- Assumed office 2014
- Preceded by: Sharda Rathore
- Constituency: Ballabgarh

Personal details
- Born: 4 April 1964 (age 62)
- Party: Bharatiya Janata Party
- Spouse: Poornima Sharma
- Children: 2

Mool Chand Sharma (born 4 April 1964) is Cabinet Minister of Transport in the Government of Haryana. He has three other portfolios of Mines and Geology, Higher Education and Elections.

Sharma is the member of the Haryana Legislative Assembly from the BJP representing the Ballabhgarh Vidhan sabha Constituency in Haryana since 2014.
