= 2019 Indian general election in Haryana =

- 12 May 2019

10 seats
- Turnout: 70.34% (▼1.11%)
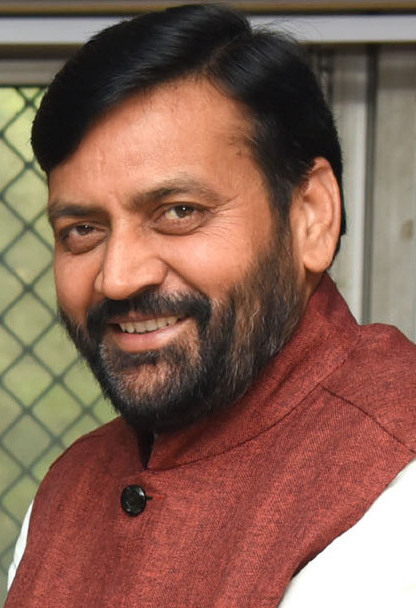

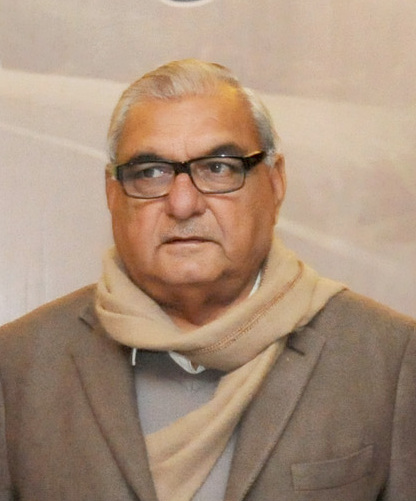

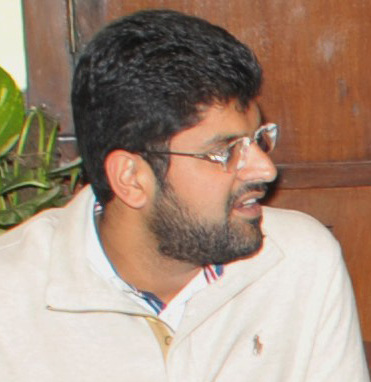

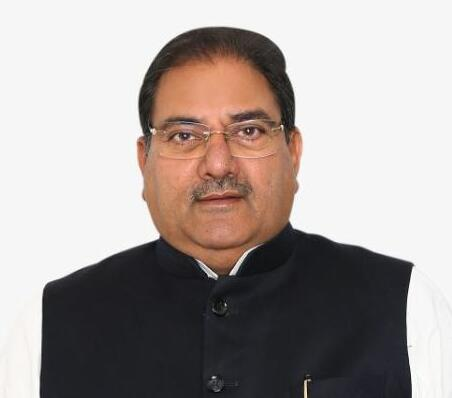
	First party	Second party	Third party
Leader	Nayab Singh Saini	Bhupinder Singh Hooda	Dushyant Chautala
Party	BJP	INC	JJP
Last election	7	1	New
Seats won	10	0	0
Seat change	▲3	▼1
Popular vote	73,57,347	36,04,106	6,19,970
Percentage	58.02%	28.42%	4.9%
Swing	▲23.32%	▲5.52%	New
	Fourth party
Leader	Abhay Singh Chautala
Party	INLD
Last election	2
Seats won	0
Seat change	▼2
Popular vote	2,40,258
Percentage	1.89%
Swing	▼22.51%
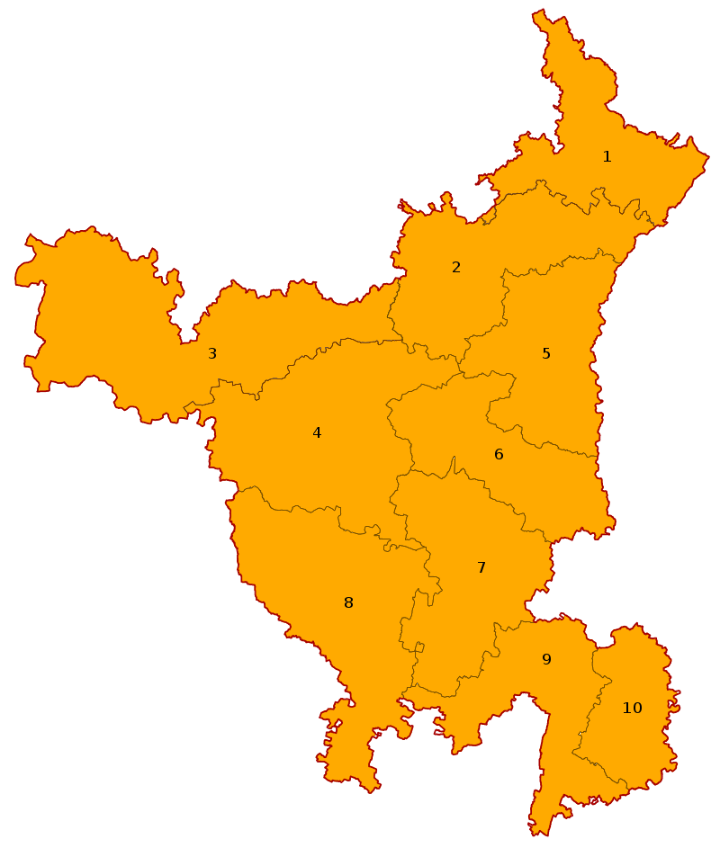
- Haryana
Prime Minister before election
Narendra Modi
BJP
Prime Minister after election
Narendra Modi
BJP

The 2019 Indian general election was held in Haryana on 12 May 2019 to constitute the 17th Lok Sabha.

== Parties and alliances ==
Party/Alliance Name		Flag	Electoral symbol	Leader	Seats contested
Bharatiya Janata Party				Manohar Lal Khattar	10
Indian National Congress				Bhupinder Singh Hooda	10
Indian National Lok Dal				Om Prakash Chautala	10
JJP+	Jannayak Janata Party			Dushyant Chautala	7
JJP+	Aam Aadmi Party			Arvind Kejriwal	3

== Candidates ==
Constituency		BJP		INC		JJP+		INLD		BSP+	
No.	Name	Party	Candidate	Party	Candidate	Party	Candidate	Party	Candidate	Party	Candidate
1	Ambala	BJP	Rattan Lal Kataria	INC	Selja Kumari	AAP	Prithvi Raj	INLD	Ram Pal Valmiki	BSP	Naresh Saran
2	Kurukshetra	BJP	Nayab Singh Saini	INC	Nirmal Singh	JJP	Jai Bhagwan Sharma	INLD	Arjun Chautala	BSP	Shashi Saini
3	Sirsa	BJP	Sunita Duggal	INC	Ashok Tanwar	JJP	Nirmal Singh Malhadi	INLD	Charanjeet Singh Rori	BSP	Janakraj Atwal
4	Hisar	BJP	Brijendra Singh	INC	Bhaway Bishnoi	JJP	Dushyant Chautala	INLD	Suresh Kot	BSP	Surender Sharma
5	Karnal	BJP	Sanjay Bhatia	INC	Kuldeep Sharma	AAP	Krishan Kumar Agarwal	INLD	Dharambir Pada	BSP	Pankaj Chaudhary
6	Sonipat	BJP	Ramesh Chander Kaushik	INC	Bhupinder Singh Hooda	JJP	Digvijay Singh Chautala	INLD	Surender Chikara	LSP	Raj Bala Saini
7	Rohtak	BJP	Arvind Kumar Sharma	INC	Deepender Singh Hooda	JJP	Pradeep Deswal	INLD	Dharambir Fauji	BSP	Kishan Lal
8	Bhiwani–Mahendragarh	BJP	Dharmvir Singh	INC	Shruti Chaudhary	JJP	Swati Yadav	INLD	Balwan Singh Fauji	LSP	Ramesh Rao Pilot
9	Gurgaon	BJP	Rao Inderjit Singh	INC	Ajay Singh Yadav	JJP	Mehmood Khan	INLD	Virender Rana	BSP	Rais Ahmad
10	Faridabad	BJP	Krishan Pal Gurjar	INC	Avtar Singh Bhadana	AAP	Naveen Jaihind	INLD	Mahender Singh Chauhan	BSP	Mandhir Singh Maan

== Result ==
=== Party wise ===
Alliance/ Party		Popular vote			Seats		
Alliance/ Party		Votes	%	±pp	Contested	Won	+/−
BJP		7,357,347	58.02	▲23.28	10	10	▲3
INC		3,604,106	28.42	▲5.50	10	0	▼1
INLD		240,258	1.89	▼22.47	10	0	▼2
JJP+	JJP	619,970	4.89	New	7	0	Steady
JJP+	AAP	45,498	0.36	▼3.88	3	0	Steady
JJP+	Total	665,468	5.25	Steady	10	0	Steady
BSP+	BSP	461,273	3.64	▼0.94	8	0	Steady
BSP+	LSP	55,280	0.44	New	2	0	Steady
BSP+	Total	516,553	4.08	Steady	10	0	Steady
Others		120,386	0.95	Steady	88	0	Steady
IND		135,637	1.07	▼0.59	85	0	Steady
NOTA		41,781	0.33	▲0.03			
Total		12,681,536	100	-	223	10	-

=== Constituency wise ===
Constituency		Winner				Runner Up				Margin	%
#	Name	Candidate	Party	Votes	%	Candidate	Party	Votes	%	Margin	%
1	Ambala	Rattan Lal Kataria	BJP	746,508	56.64	Selja Kumari	INC	404,163	30.67	342,345	25.97
2	Kurukshetra	Nayab Singh Saini	BJP	688,629	55.93	Nirmal Singh	INC	304,038	24.70	384,591	31.23
3	Sirsa	Sunita Duggal	BJP	714,351	52.13	Ashok Tanwar	INC	404,433	29.51	309,918	22.62
4	Hisar	Brijendra Singh	BJP	603,289	51.04	Dushyant Chautala	JJP	289,221	24.47	314,068	26.57
5	Karnal	Sanjay Bhatia	BJP	911,594	70.04	Kuldip Sharma	INC	255,452	19.63	656,142	50.41
6	Sonipat	Ramesh Kaushik	BJP	587,664	51.95	Bhupinder Hooda	INC	422,800	37.38	164,864	14.57
7	Rohtak	Arvind Kumar Sharma	BJP	573,845	46.84	Deepender Hooda	INC	566,342	46.23	7,503	0.61
8	Bhiwani–Mahendragarh	Dharambir Chaudhary	BJP	736,699	63.19	Shruti Choudhry	INC	292,236	25.07	444,463	38.12
9	Gurgaon	Rao Inderjit Singh	BJP	881,546	60.88	Ajay Singh Yadav	INC	495,290	34.20	386,256	26.68
10	Faridabad	Krishan Pal Gurjar	BJP	913,222	68.76	Avtar Singh Bhadana	INC	274,983	20.70	638,239	48.06

== Post-election Union Council of Ministers from Haryana ==
#	Name	Constituency	Designation	Department	From	To	Party
1	Rao Inderjit Singh	Gurgaon	MoS (I/C); MoS	Ministry of Statistics and Programme Implementation (I/C); Ministry of Planning (I/C); Ministry of Corporate Affairs (MoS from July 2021)	31 May 2019	9 June 2024	BJP
2	Krishan Pal Gurjar	Faridabad	MoS	Ministry of Power (from July 2021); Ministry of Heavy Industries (from July 2021); Ministry of Social Justice and Empowerment (until July 2021)	31 May 2019	9 June 2024	BJP
3	Rattan Lal Kataria	Ambala (SC)	MoS	Ministry of Jal Shakti; Ministry of Social Justice and Empowerment	31 May 2019	7 July 2021	BJP

== Assembly segments wise lead of Parties ==
2019 Haryana Lok Sabha Elections Assembly Wise Map

Party	Assembly segments	Position in Assembly (as of 2019 election)
Bharatiya Janata Party	79	40
Indian National Congress	10	30
Jannayak Janta Party	1	10
Indian National Lok Dal	0	1
Total	90	
