= Sirsa Lok Sabha constituency =

Lok Sabha constituency in Haryana

Coordinates: 29.5°N 75.0°E

Sirsa HR-3
- Lok Sabha constituency
- Interactive Map Outlining Sirsa Lok Sabha constituency

Constituency details
- Country: India
- Region: North India
- State: Haryana
- Assembly constituencies: Narwana; Tohana; Fatehabad; Ratia; Kalanwali; Dabwali; Rania; Sirsa; Ellenabad
- Established: 1962
- Reservation: SC

Member of Parliament
- 18th Lok Sabha
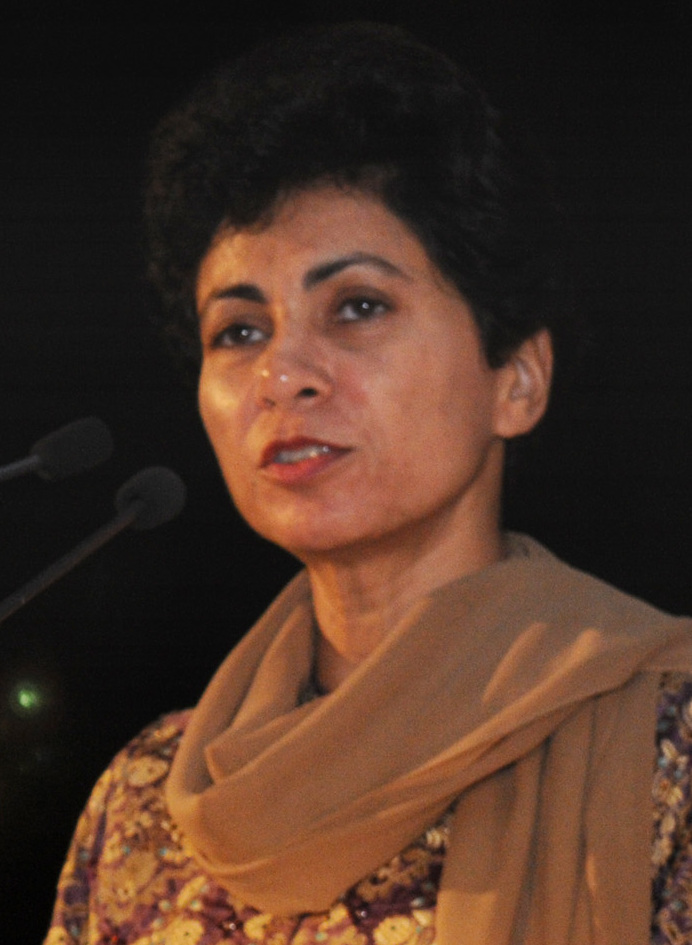
- Incumbent Selja Kumari
- Party: INC
- Alliance: INDIA
- Elected year: 2024

Sirsa Lok Sabha constituency is one of the 10 Lok Sabha (parliamentary) constituencies in Haryana state in northern India. This constituency covers the entire Sirsa and Fatehabad districts and part of Jind district of the state. It is reserved for the Scheduled caste candidates since its inception in 1967.

== Assembly segments ==
At present, Sirsa Lok Sabha constituency comprises nine Vidhan Sabha (state legislative assembly) constituencies. These are:

#	Name	District	Member	Party	Leading (in 2024)
38	Narwana (SC)	Jind	Krishan Kumar Bedi	BJP	INC
39	Tohana	Fatehabad	Paramvir Singh	INC	INC
40	Fatehabad	Fatehabad	Balwan Singh Daulatpuria	INC	INC
41	Ratia (SC)	Fatehabad	Jarnail Singh	INC	INC
42	Kalanwali (SC)	Sirsa	Shishpal Singh	INC	INC
43	Dabwali	Sirsa	Aditya Devilal	INLD	INC
44	Rania	Sirsa	Arjun Chautala	INLD	INC
45	Sirsa	Sirsa	Gokul Setia	INC	INC
46	Ellenabad	Sirsa	Bharat Singh Beniwal	INC	INC

== Members of Parliament ==
- 1952-61: Constituency does not exist

Year	Name	Party
1962	Daljit Singh	Indian National Congress
1967	Dalbir Singh	Indian National Congress
1971	Dalbir Singh	Indian National Congress
1977	Chand Ram	Janata Party
1980	Dalbir Singh	Indian National Congress
1984	Dalbir Singh	Indian National Congress
1988^	Het Ram	Lok Dal
1989	Het Ram	Janata Dal
1991	Selja Kumari	Indian National Congress
1996	Selja Kumari	Indian National Congress
1998	Sushil Kumar Indora	Indian National Lok Dal
1999	Sushil Kumar Indora	Indian National Lok Dal
2004	Atma Singh Gill	Indian National Congress
2009	Ashok Tanwar	Indian National Congress
2014	Charanjeet Singh Rori	Indian National Lok Dal
2019	Sunita Duggal	Bharatiya Janata Party
2024	Selja Kumari	Indian National Congress

^ by poll

== Election results ==
=== 2024 ===
2024 Indian general election: Sirsa
Party	Candidate	Votes	%	±%
INC	Selja Kumari	733,823	54.17	▲24.64
BJP	Ashok Tanwar	4,65,326	34.35	▼17.81
INLD	Sandeep Lot Valmiki	92,453	6.82	▲0.39
JJP	Ramesh Khatak	20,080	1.48	▼5.52
BSP	Lilu Ram Asakhera	10,151	0.75	▲1.08
NOTA	None of the above	4,123	0.30	▼0.02
Majority		2,68,497	19.82	▼2.81
Turnout		13,56,358	69.87	▼6.12
INC gain from BJP		Swing		

=== 2019 ===
2019 Indian general elections: Sirsa
Party	Candidate	Votes	%	±%
BJP	Sunita Duggal	714,351	52.16	New
INC	Ashok Tanwar	4,04,433	29.53	▼1.01
JJP	Nirmal Singh Malri	95,914	7.00	New
INLD	Charanjeet Singh Rori	88,093	6.43	▼33.16
BSP	Janak Raj Atwal	25,107	1.83	▲0.21
NOTA	None of the Above	4,339	0.32	−−−
Majority		3,09,918	22.63	▲13.58
Turnout		13,70,312	75.99	▼1.04
BJP gain from INLD		Swing	▲52.16	

=== General election 2014 ===
2014 Indian general elections: Sirsa
Party	Candidate	Votes	%	±%
INLD	Charanjeet Singh Rori	506,370	39.59	▲0.85
INC	Ashok Tanwar	3,90,634	30.54	▼11.81
HJC(BL)	Dr. Sushil Indora	2,41,067	18.85	▲14.19
AAP	Poonam Chand Ratti	66,844	5.23	New
BSP	Mange Ram	20,750	1.62	▼6.13
NOTA	None of the Above	4,033	0.32	−−−
Majority		1,15,736	9.05	▲5.44
Turnout		12,79,105	77.03	
INLD gain from INC		Swing	▼5.05	

=== General election 2009 ===
2009 Indian general elections: Sirsa
Party	Candidate	Votes	%	±%
INC	Ashok Tanwar	415,584	42.35	
INLD	Dr. Sita Ram	3,80,085	38.73	
BSP	Rajesh Kumar	76,010	7.75	
HJC(BL)	Rajendra Prasad	45,709	4.66	
Majority		35,499	3.62	
Turnout		9,81,239	74.93	
INC hold		Swing		

== See also ==
- Sirsa district
- List of constituencies of the Lok Sabha
