= 2024 Indian general election in Haryana =

- 25 May 2024

All 10 Haryana seats in the Lok Sabha
- Opinion polls
- Turnout: 64.77% (▼5.57%)
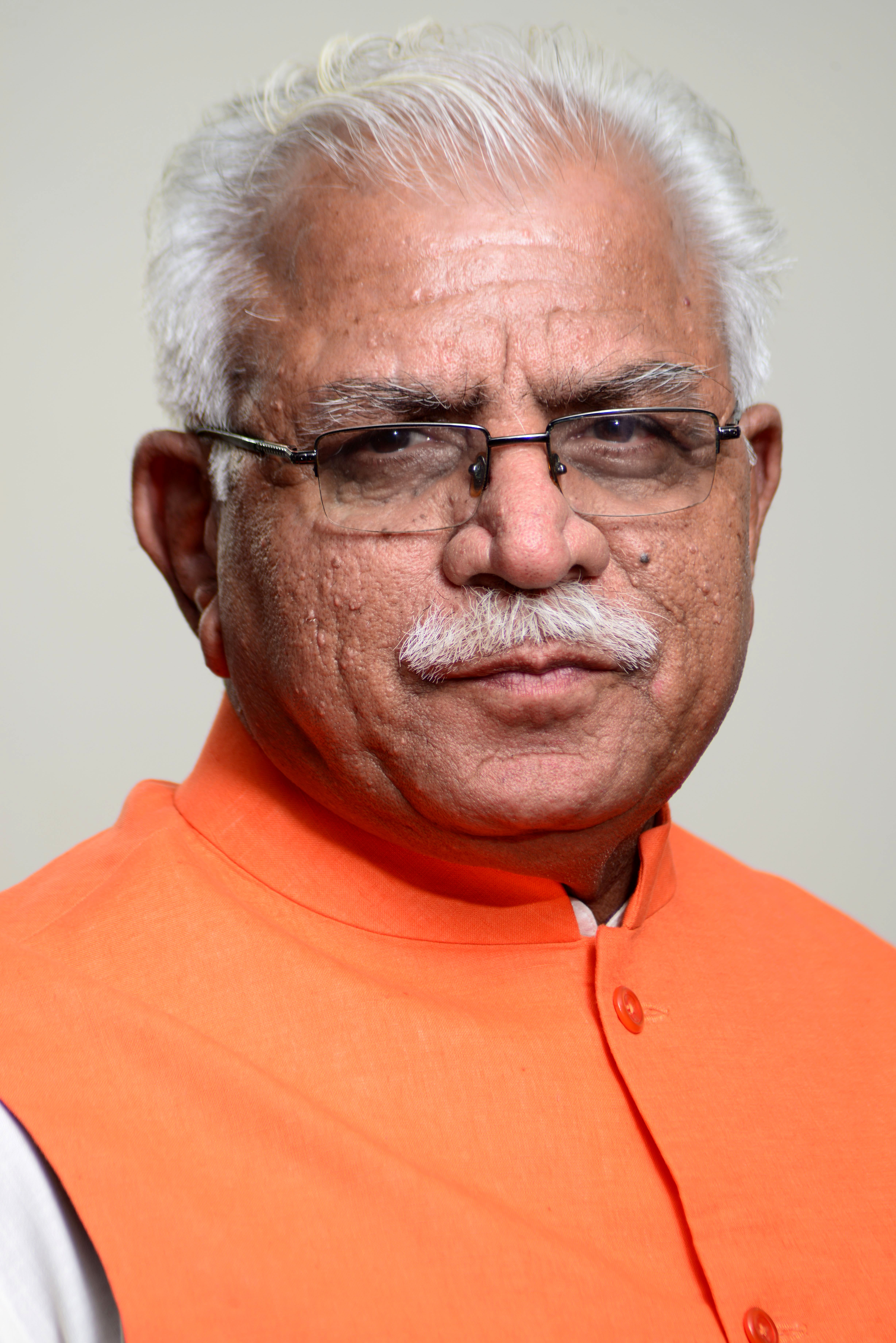

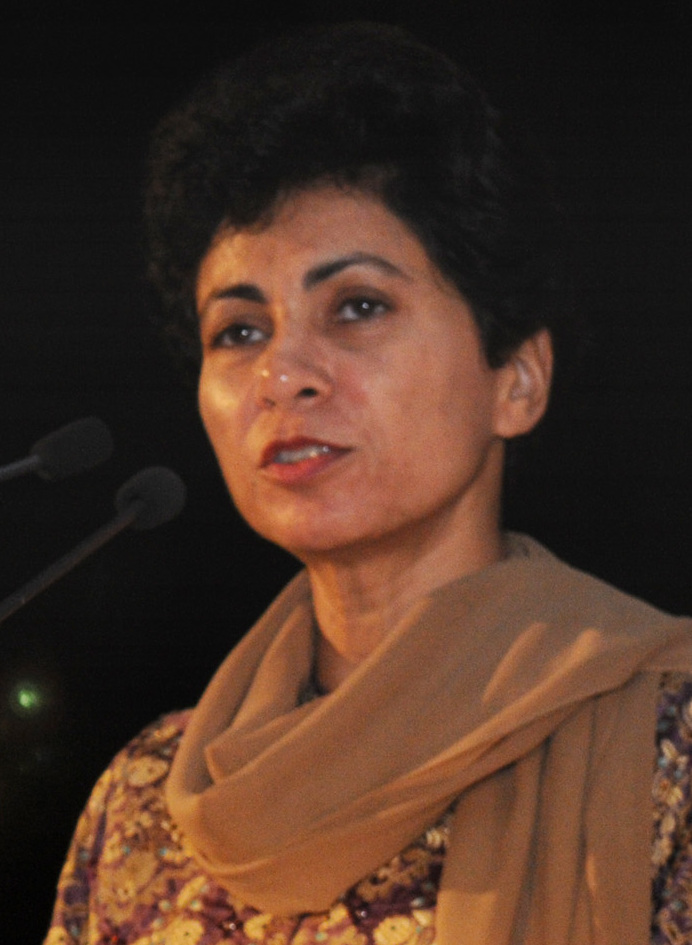
	First party	Second party
Leader	Manohar Lal Khattar	Selja Kumari
Party	BJP	INC
Alliance	NDA	INDIA
Leader since	2014	1991
Leader's seat	Karnal	Sirsa
Last election	58.02%, 10 seats	28.42%, 0 seat
Seats won	5	5
Seat change	▼5	▲5
Popular vote	5,996,486	5,702,938
Percentage	46.11%	43.68%
Swing	▼11.91%	▲18.74%
- Seatwise Result Map of the 2024 general election in Haryana
Prime Minister before election
Narendra Modi
BJP
Prime Minister after election
Narendra Modi
BJP

The 2024 Indian general election was held in Haryana on 25 May 2024 to elect 10 members of the 18th Lok Sabha.

== Election schedule ==
Poll event	Phase
Poll event	VI
Notification date	29 April
Last date for filing nomination	6 May
Scrutiny of nomination	7 May
Last Date for withdrawal of nomination	9 May
Date of poll	25 May
Date of counting of votes/Result	4 June 2024
No. of constituencies	10

== Parties and alliances ==
=== National Democratic Alliance ===
National Democratic Alliance

Party	Flag	Symbol	Leader	Seats contested
Bharatiya Janata Party			Manohar Lal Khattar	10

=== Indian National Developmental Inclusive Alliance ===
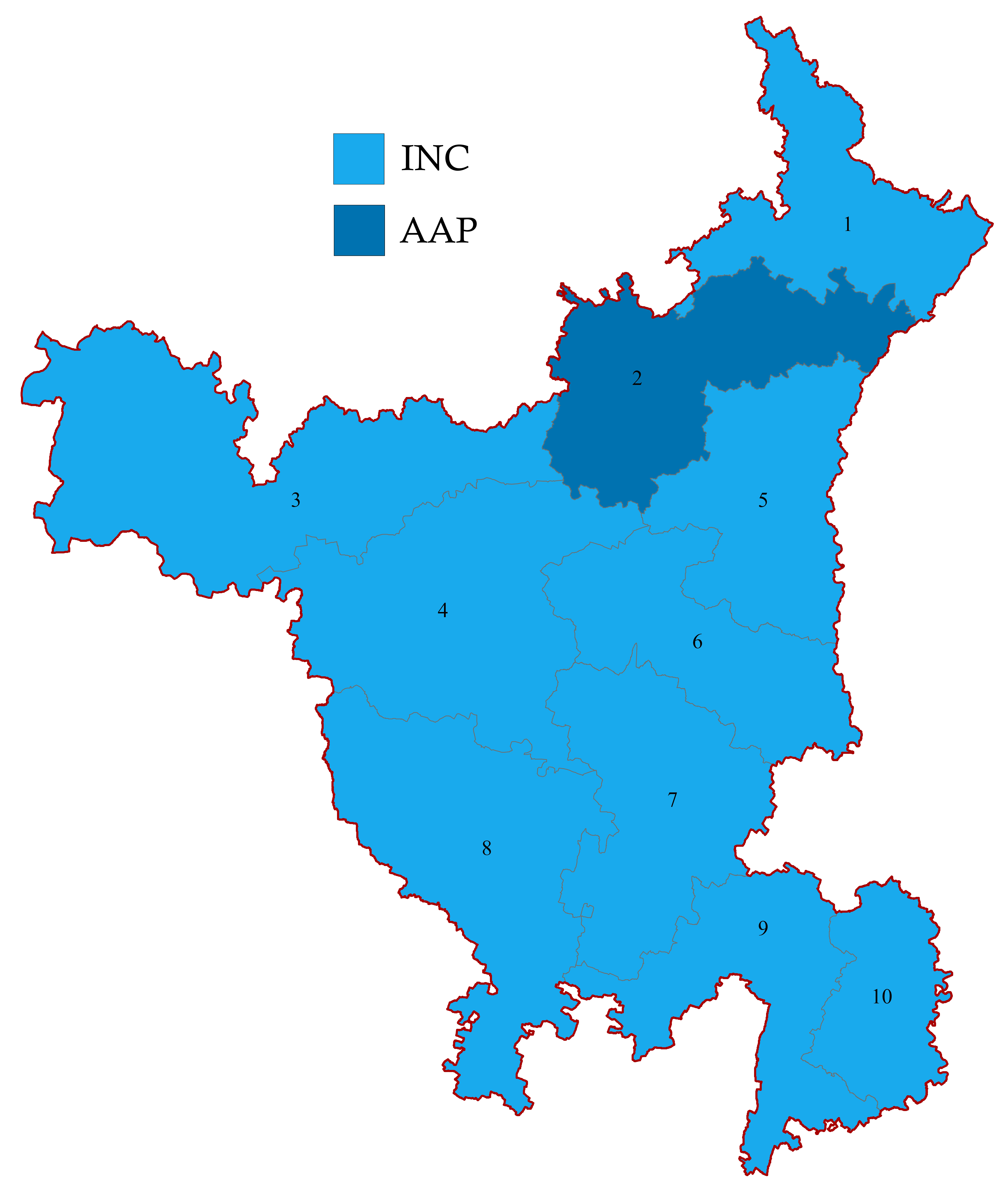
Indian National Developmental Inclusive Alliance

Party	Flag	Symbol	Leader	Seats contested
Indian National Congress			Udai Bhan	9
Aam Aadmi Party			Sushil Gupta	1
Total				10

=== Others ===
Recognised parties
Party	Flag	Symbol	Leader	Seats contested
Jannayak Janata Party			Dushyant Chautala	10
Bahujan Samaj Party			Rajveer Sorki	9
Indian National Lok Dal			Om Prakash Chautala	7

=== Others ===
Unrecognised parties
Party	Symbol	Seats contested
Peoples Party of India (Democratic)		10
Socialist Unity Centre of India (Communist)		6
Bharatiya Asha Party		5
Bharatheeya Jawan Kisan Party		4
Bhartiya Shakti Chetna Party		4
Aam Aadmi Parivartan Party		2
Ekam Sanatan Bharat Dal		2
Rashtrawadi Janlok Party (Satya)		2
Rashtriya Lokswaraj Party		2
Aarakshan Virodhi Party		1
Akhil Bhartiya Kisan Majdoor Party		1
Aazad Samaj Party (Kanshi Ram)		1
Bahujan Mukti Party		1
Right to Recall Party		1
Social Democratic Party of India		1
Bharatiya Yuva Jan Ekta Party		1
Buland Bharat Party		1
Haryana Jansena Party		1
Jan Sewak Kranti Party		1
Jan Shakti Dal		1
Kisan Mazdoor Sangharsh Party		1
Loktantrik Janshakti Party		1
Rashtra Nirman Party		1
Rashtriya Vikas Party		1
Samrat Mihir Bhoj Samaj Party		1
Super Power India Party		1
Swayam Shashan Party		1
Adim Bharatiya Dal		1
Bahujan Republican Socialist Party		1
Global Republican Party		1
Rashtriya Jatigat Aarakshan Virodhi Party		1
Vikas India Party		1
Samast Samaj Party		1
Rashtriya Janshakti Party (Eklavya)		1

== Candidates ==
Constituency		NDA		INDIA	
No.	Name	Party	Candidate	Party	Candidate
1	Ambala (SC)	BJP	Banto Kataria	INC	Varun Chaudhary
2	Kurukshetra	BJP	Naveen Jindal	AAP	Sushil Gupta
3	Sirsa (SC)	BJP	Ashok Tanwar	INC	Selja Kumari
4	Hisar	BJP	Ranjit Singh Chautala	INC	Jai Parkash
5	Karnal	BJP	Manohar Lal Khattar	INC	Divyanshu Budhiraja
6	Sonipat	BJP	Mohan Lal Badoli	INC	Satpal Brahmachari
7	Rohtak	BJP	Arvind Kumar Sharma	INC	Deepender Singh Hooda
8	Bhiwani–Mahendragarh	BJP	Dharambir Singh Chaudhary	INC	Rao Dan Singh
9	Gurgaon	BJP	Rao Inderjit Singh	INC	Raj Babbar
10	Faridabad	BJP	Krishan Pal Gurjar	INC	Mahender Pratap Singh

== Surveys and polls ==
=== Opinion polls ===
Polling agency	Date published	Margin of error				Lead
Polling agency	Date published	Margin of error	NDA	INDIA	Others	Lead
ABP News-CVoter	April 2024	±5%	9	1	0	NDA
ABP News-CVoter	March 2024	±5%	8	2	0	NDA
JJP leaves the NDA
India Today-CVoter	February 2024	±3-5%	8	2	0	NDA
Times Now-ETG	December 2023	±3%	8-10	0-2	0	NDA
India TV-CNX	October 2023	±3%	8	2	0	NDA
Times Now-ETG	September 2023	±3%	7-9	1-3	0	NDA
Times Now-ETG	August 2023	±3%	6-8	2-4	0	NDA

Polling agency	Date published	Margin of error				Lead
Polling agency	Date published	Margin of error	NDA	INDIA	Others	Lead
ABP News-CVoter	April 2024	±5%	53%	38%	9%	15
ABP News-CVoter	March 2024	±5%	52%	38%	10%	14
JJP leaves NDA
India Today-CVoter	February 2024	±3-5%	50%	38%	12%	12

=== Exit Polls ===
Polling agency				Lead
Polling agency	NDA	INDIA	Others	Lead
TV9 Bharatvarsh- People's Insight - Polstrat	8	2	0	NDA
Actual results	5	5	0	Tie

== Results ==
=== Results by alliance or party ===
Alliance/ Party		Popular vote			Seats		
Alliance/ Party		Votes	%	±pp	Contested	Won	+/−
INDIA	INC	5,702,938	43.68		9	5	▲5
INDIA	AAP	513,154	3.93		1	0	Steady
INDIA	Total	6,216,092	47.61		10	5	▲5
NDA	BJP	6,019,165	46.10		10	5	▼5
INLD		226,975	1.74		7	0	
BSP		166,511	1.28		9	0	
JJP		113,827	0.87		10	0	
NCP-SP		29,151	0.22		1	0	
ASP(KR)		8,754	0.07		1	0	
Others		91,114	0.70		71	0	
IND		140,441	1.08		104	0	
NOTA		43,542	0.33	Steady			
Total		13,055,572	100	-	223	10	-

=== Results by constituency ===
Constituency		Poll%	Winner				Runner Up				Margin	%
#	Name	Poll%	Candidate	Party	Votes	%	Candidate	Party	Votes	%	Margin	%
1	Ambala (SC)	67.29 ▼	Varun Chaudhary	INC	6,63,657	49.28	Banto Kataria	BJP	6,14,621	45.64	49,036	3.64
2	Kurukshetra	67.06 ▼	Naveen Jindal	BJP	5,42,175	44.96	Sushil Gupta	AAP	5,13,154	42.55	29,021	2.41
3	Sirsa (SC)	69.87 ▼	Selja Kumari	INC	7,33,823	54.17	Ashok Tanwar	BJP	4,65,326	34.35	2,68,497	19.82
4	Hisar	65.30 ▼	Jai Parkash	INC	5,70,424	48.58	Ranjit Singh Chautala	BJP	5,07,043	43.19	63,381	5.39
5	Karnal	63.83 ▼	Manohar Lal Khattar	BJP	7,39,285	54.93	Divyanshu Budhiraja	INC	5,06,708	37.65	2,32,577	17.28
6	Sonipat	63.42 ▼	Satpal Brahmachari	INC	5,48,682	48.82	Mohan Lal Badoli	BJP	5,26,866	46.88	21,816	1.94
7	Rohtak	65.53 ▼	Deepender Singh Hooda	INC	7,83,578	62.76	Arvind Kumar Sharma	BJP	4,38,280	35.11	3,45,298	27.65
8	Bhiwani–Mahendragarh	65.02 ▼	Dharambir Singh Chaudhary	BJP	5,88,664	49.74	Rao Dan Singh	INC	5,47,154	46.24	41,510	3.50
9	Gurgaon	62.02 ▼	Rao Inderjit Singh	BJP	8,08,336	50.48	Raj Babbar	INC	7,33,257	45.79	75,079	4.69
10	Faridabad	60.48 ▼	Krishan Pal Gurjar	BJP	7,88,569	53.60	Mahender Pratap Singh	INC	6,15,655	41.84	1,72,914	11.76

== Assembly segments wise lead of Parties ==
2024 Haryana Lok Sabha Elections Assembly Wise Leads Map

Party	Assembly segments		Position in Assembly (as of 2024 election)
Party	Alliance	Party	Position in Assembly (as of 2024 election)
Indian National Congress	46	42	37
Aam Aadmi Party	46	4	–
Bharatiya Janata Party	44	44	48
Indian National Lok Dal	–	–	2
Other			3
Total	90		

== See also ==
- 2024 Indian general election in Himachal Pradesh
- 2024 Indian general election in Jammu and Kashmir
- 2024 Indian general election in Chandigarh
- 2024 Indian general election in Punjab
- 2024 Indian general election in Jharkhand
