= Jarnail Singh =

Jarnail Singh may refer to:

- Jarnail Singh Bhindranwale (1947–1984), religious leader
- Jarnail Singh (footballer) (1936–2000), captain of the India national football team from 1965 to 1967
- Jarnail Singh (referee) (born 1962), retired English association football referee of Indian descent
- Jarnail Singh (physician) (1953–2021), Singaporean physician specialised in aviation medicine
- Jarnail Singh (politician, born 1973) (1973–2021), AAP politician and the party's candidate in 2014 Lok Sabha elections
- Jarnail Singh (politician, born 1981), AAP politician and MLA from Tilak Nagar constituency
- Jarnail Singh (Haryana politician), INC politician and MLA from Ratia constituency

== See also ==
- Gernail Singh, a 1987 Pakistani film
