= Kalanwali Assembly constituency =

Constituency of the Haryana legislative assembly in India

Coordinates: 29.83°N 74.98°E

- Constituency No. 42 for the Haryana Legislative Assembly

Constituency details
- Country: India
- Region: North India
- State: Haryana
- Total electors: 1,84,398
- Reservation: SC

Member of Legislative Assembly
- 15th Haryana Legislative Assembly
- Incumbent Shishpal Singh
- Party: Indian National Congress
- Elected year: 2024

Kalanwali Assembly constituency is one of the 90 assembly constituencies of Haryana, a northern state of India. Kalan Wali is also part of Sirsa Lok Sabha constituency. It is a reserved seat for the Scheduled Castes.

Shishpal Singh is the current MLA from Kalanwali.

== Members of Legislative Assembly ==
Year	Member	Party
Till 2009: Constituency did not exist
2009	Charanjeet Singh	Shiromani Akali Dal
2014	Balkaur Singh	Shiromani Akali Dal
2019	Shishpal Singh	Indian National Congress
2024	Shishpal Singh	Indian National Congress

== Election results ==
=== Assembly Election 2024 ===
2024 Haryana Legislative Assembly election: Kalanwali
Party	Candidate	Votes	%	±%
INC	Shishpal Singh	66,728	47.47%	▲7.71
BJP	Rajinder Singh Desujodha	43,769	31.13%	▲8.55
INLD	Gurtej Singh	24,200	17.21%	New
AAP	Jasdev Singh	3,629	2.58%	New
JJP	Gurjant Singh	1,405	1.00%	▼8.31
NOTA	None of the Above	852	0.61%	▼0.10
Margin of victory		22,959	16.33%	▲1.91
Turnout		1,40,583	76.32%	▲1.23
Registered electors		1,84,398		▲3.65
INC hold		Swing	▲7.71	

=== Assembly Election 2019 ===
2019 Haryana Legislative Assembly election: Kalanwali
Party	Candidate	Votes	%	±%
INC	Shishpal Singh	53,059	39.76	▲9.12
SAD	Rajinder Singh Desujodha	33,816	25.34	▼14.95
BJP	Balkaur Singh	30,134	22.58	▲9.92
JJP	Nirmal Singh Malri	12,420	9.31	New
BSP	Karnail Singh Odhan	1,401	1.05	▲0.28
NOTA	Nota	944	0.71	▲0.13
HLP	Pargat Singh Bhiwan	857	0.64	▼10.84
Margin of victory		19,243	14.42	▲4.77
Turnout		1,33,449	75.09	▼8.67
Registered electors		1,77,723		▲10.85
INC gain from SAD		Swing	▼0.54	

=== Assembly Election 2014 ===
2014 Haryana Legislative Assembly election: Kalanwali
Party	Candidate	Votes	%	±%
SAD	Balkaur Singh	54,112	40.29	▼10.68
INC	Shishpal Keharwala	41,147	30.64	▼9.5
BJP	Rajinder Singh Desujodha	17,005	12.66	▲11.68
HLP	Nirmal Singh Malri	15,416	11.48	New
CPI(M)	Chain Singh	1,593	1.19	New
HJC(BL)	Mela Singh	1,548	1.15	▼0.68
BSP	Gurjant Singh	1,039	0.77	▼3.58
SP	Raj Kumar Nagar	969	0.72	▼0.31
NOTA	None of the Above	778	0.58	New
Margin of victory		12,965	9.65	▼1.17
Turnout		1,34,290	83.76	▲0.26
Registered electors		1,60,330		▲15.53
SAD hold		Swing	▼10.68	

=== Assembly Election 2009 ===
2009 Haryana Legislative Assembly election: Kalanwali
Party	Candidate	Votes	%	±%
SAD	Charanjeet Singh	59,064	50.97	New
INC	Dr. Sushil Kumar Indora	46,520	40.14	New
BSP	Major Singh	5,047	4.36	New
HJC(BL)	Prof. Rajesh Vaid	2,125	1.83	New
SP	Raj Kumar Nagar	1,192	1.03	New
BJP	Rattan Lal Bamnia	1,136	0.98	New
Independent	Jasvir Singh	765	0.66	New
Margin of victory		12,544	10.82	
Turnout		1,15,880	83.50	
Registered electors		1,38,779		
SAD win (new seat)				

== See also ==
- Kalan Wali
- List of constituencies of the Haryana Legislative Assembly
