= Balkaur Singh =

Indian politician

Member of the Haryana Legislative Assembly
- In office 2014–2019
- Preceded by: Charanjeet Singh
- Succeeded by: Shishpal Singh
- Constituency: Kalanwali Assembly constituency

Personal details
- Born: 1 September 1969 (age 56) Sangaria, Rajasthan
- Party: Bharatiya Janata Party
- Other party: Shiromani Akali Dal (before 2019)
- Spouse: Sukhminder Kaur
- Children: 4

Balkaur Singh is a member of the Haryana Legislative Assembly from the Shiromani Akali Dal representing the Kalanwali Vidhan sabha Constituency in Haryana. He joined Bharatiya Janata Party just before 2019 Haryana Legislative Assembly election.
