= Sirsa Assembly constituency =

Legislative Assembly constituency in Haryana State, India

Coordinates: 29.54°N 75.04°E

Sirsa
- Constituency No. 45 for the Haryana Legislative Assembly

Constituency details
- Country: India
- Region: North India
- State: Haryana
- District: Sirsa
- Lok Sabha constituency: Sirsa
- Total electors: 2,30,157
- Reservation: None

Member of Legislative Assembly
- 15th Haryana Legislative Assembly
- Incumbent Gokul Setia
- Party: Indian National Congress
- Elected year: 2024

Sirsa Assembly constituency is one of the 90 Legislative Assembly constituencies of Haryana state in India.

It is part of Sirsa district.

== Members of the Legislative Assembly ==
Year	Member	Party
1967	L Dass	Bharatiya Jana Sangh
1968	Premsukh Dass	Indian National Congress
1972	Premsukh Dass	Indian National Congress
1977	Shankar Lal	Janata Party
1982	Lachhman Dass Arora	Independent
1987	Hazar Chand	Lokdal
1991	Lachhman Dass Arora	Indian National Congress
1996	Ganeshi Lal	Bharatiya Janata Party
2000	Lachhman Dass Arora	Indian National Congress
2005	Lachhman Dass Arora	Indian National Congress
2009	Gopal Goyal Kanda	Independent
2014	Makhan Lal Singla	Indian National Lok Dal
2019	Gopal Goyal Kanda	Haryana Lokhit Party
2024	Gokul Setia	Indian National Congress

== Election results ==
=== Assembly Election 2024 ===
2024 Haryana Legislative Assembly election: Sirsa
Party	Candidate	Votes	%	±%
INC	Gokul Setia	79,020	50.00%	▲42.88
HLP	Gopal Goyal Kanda	71,786	45.43%	▲13.77
JJP	Pawan Sherpura	1,762	1.11%	▼2.22
Independent	Ca Darvesh Swami	1,182	0.75%	New
NOTA	None of the Above	1,115	0.71%	▲0.30
Margin of victory		7,234	4.58%	▲4.15
Turnout		1,58,031	68.11%	▼0.27
Registered electors		2,30,157		
INC gain from HLP		Swing	▲18.35	

=== Assembly Election 2019 ===
2019 Haryana Legislative Assembly election: Sirsa
Party	Candidate	Votes	%	±%
HLP	Gopal Goyal Kanda	44,915	31.65%	▲1.39
Independent	Gokul Setia	44,313	31.23%	New
BJP	Pardeep Ratusaria	30,142	21.24%	▼5.62
INC	Hoshiari Lal	10,111	7.13%	▲0.34
JJP	Rajender Ganeriwala	4,732	3.33%	New
Independent	Mani Ram	1,547	1.09%	New
AAP	Virender Kumar	868	0.61%	New
BSP	Sardar Phool Chand	787	0.55%	New
Margin of victory		602	0.42%	▼1.61
Turnout		1,41,905	68.38%	▼9.42
Registered electors		2,07,519		▲11.96
HLP gain from INLD		Swing	▼0.64	

=== Assembly Election 2014 ===
2014 Haryana Legislative Assembly election: Sirsa
Party	Candidate	Votes	%	±%
INLD	Makhan Lal Singla	46,573	32.30%	▲4.96
HLP	Gopal Goyal Kanda	43,635	30.26%	New
BJP	Sunita Setia	38,742	26.87%	▲25.4
INC	Naveen Kumar Kedia	9,779	6.78%	▼19.39
Independent	Kanchan Kumar	1,097	0.76%	New
Independent	Satbir Singh	900	0.62%	New
NOTA	None of the Above	875	0.61%	New
Margin of victory		2,938	2.04%	▼3.55
Turnout		1,44,207	77.80%	▲0.76
Registered electors		1,85,357		▲23.25
INLD gain from Independent		Swing	▼0.63	

=== Assembly Election 2009 ===
2009 Haryana Legislative Assembly election: Sirsa
Party	Candidate	Votes	%	±%
Independent	Gopal Goyal Kanda	38,147	32.92%	New
INLD	Padam Chand	31,678	27.34%	▼12.93
INC	Lachhman Dass Arora	30,328	26.17%	▼27.6
HJC(BL)	Veer Bhan	8,346	7.20%	New
BJP	Rohtash Jangra	1,702	1.47%	▼1.67
BSP	Shanti Swaroop	952	0.82%	▲0.08
Independent	Jamna Bai	893	0.77%	New
Independent	Sunita Devi	742	0.64%	New
Margin of victory		6,469	5.58%	▼7.92
Turnout		1,15,867	77.04%	▲3.61
Registered electors		1,50,395		▼2.57
Independent gain from INC		Swing	▼20.85	

=== Assembly Election 2005 ===
2005 Haryana Legislative Assembly election: Sirsa
Party	Candidate	Votes	%	±%
INC	Lachhman Dass Arora	60,957	53.78%	▲12.11
INLD	Padam Chand Jain	45,653	40.27%	New
BJP	Vaid Siri Niwas Sharma	3,555	3.14%	▼23.01
Independent	Subhash Chand	999	0.88%	New
BSP	Shiv Kumar	845	0.75%	▲0.16
Margin of victory		15,304	13.50%	▼2.02
Turnout		1,13,355	73.43%	▲5.45
Registered electors		1,54,370		▲7.91
INC hold		Swing	▲12.11	

=== Assembly Election 2000 ===
2000 Haryana Legislative Assembly election: Sirsa
Party	Candidate	Votes	%	±%
INC	Lachhman Dass Arora	40,522	41.67%	▲10.07
BJP	Jagdish Chopra	25,431	26.15%	▼9.27
Independent	Seth Gopi Chand	24,935	25.64%	New
CPI(M)	Avtar Singh	1,522	1.56%	New
HVP	Prem Kumar	1,090	1.12%	New
Independent	Rattan Lal	627	0.64%	New
Independent	Subhash Chand	602	0.62%	New
BSP	Jagir Singh Jammu	565	0.58%	New
Independent	Shiri Ram	502	0.52%	New
Margin of victory		15,091	15.52%	▲11.70
Turnout		97,256	68.03%	▼4.97
Registered electors		1,43,057		▲4.37
INC gain from BJP		Swing	▲6.24	

=== Assembly Election 1996 ===
1996 Haryana Legislative Assembly election: Sirsa
Party	Candidate	Votes	%	±%
BJP	Ganeshi Lal	35,419	35.42%	▲18.27
INC	Lachhman Dass S/O Dhira Mal	31,599	31.60%	▼8.63
SAP	Gopi Chand	22,848	22.85%	New
CPI	Lekh Raj S/O Bal Chand	2,045	2.05%	New
Independent	Baldev Singh	833	0.83%	New
Independent	Lachhman Dass S/O Harichand	808	0.81%	New
Margin of victory		3,820	3.82%	▼19.27
Turnout		99,996	75.26%	▲7.20
Registered electors		1,37,069		▲9.55
BJP gain from INC		Swing	▼4.81	

=== Assembly Election 1991 ===
1991 Haryana Legislative Assembly election: Sirsa
Party	Candidate	Votes	%	±%
INC	Lachhman Dass Arora	33,102	40.23%	▲9.37
BJP	Ganeshi Lal	14,107	17.15%	New
HVP	Hari Chand	12,723	15.46%	New
JP	Hazar Chand	12,256	14.90%	New
Independent	Surinder Singh	1,843	2.24%	New
Independent	Nonihal Singh	1,690	2.05%	New
Independent	Ram Paul	1,478	1.80%	New
Independent	Mahabir Parshad Ganeriwala	855	1.04%	New
Independent	Harbhagwan	430	0.52%	New
Margin of victory		18,995	23.09%	▲15.95
Turnout		82,278	67.55%	▼8.59
Registered electors		1,25,125		▲16.53
INC gain from LKD		Swing	▲2.23	

=== Assembly Election 1987 ===
1987 Haryana Legislative Assembly election: Sirsa
Party	Candidate	Votes	%	±%
LKD	Hazar Chand	30,335	38.00%	New
INC	Lachhman Dass Arora	24,637	30.86%	▲3.54
Independent	Mahavir Prasad Ratusaria	19,724	24.71%	New
Independent	Mahavir Prasad	1,567	1.96%	New
Independent	Jesh Raj	854	1.07%	New
Independent	Nauniha Singh	400	0.50%	New
Margin of victory		5,698	7.14%	▲4.19
Turnout		79,831	75.24%	▲1.88
Registered electors		1,07,373		▲29.03
LKD gain from Independent		Swing	▲7.39	

=== Assembly Election 1982 ===
1982 Haryana Legislative Assembly election: Sirsa
Party	Candidate	Votes	%	±%
Independent	Lachhman Dass Arora	18,458	30.61%	New
BJP	Mahavir Prasad Ratusaria	16,678	27.66%	New
INC	Ram Sarup Bansal	16,477	27.32%	▲6.22
JP	Shanker Lal	3,970	6.58%	▼24.73
CPI	Jai Chand	2,541	4.21%	▼0.2
Independent	Ram Sarup	380	0.63%	New
Independent	Madan Mohan Kanda	371	0.62%	New
Margin of victory		1,780	2.95%	▼6.71
Turnout		60,304	73.68%	▲6.64
Registered electors		83,218		▲20.13
Independent gain from JP		Swing	▼0.70	

=== Assembly Election 1977 ===
1977 Haryana Legislative Assembly election: Sirsa
Party	Candidate	Votes	%	±%
JP	Shankar Lal	14,276	31.31%	New
Independent	Lachhman Dass Arora	9,870	21.65%	New
INC	Ram Sarup	9,621	21.10%	▼29.06
Independent	Sarv Mitter	7,541	16.54%	New
CPI	Jai Chand	2,014	4.42%	New
Independent	Mahabir Parshad Ganeriwala	1,239	2.72%	New
Independent	Nathu Ram Swami	595	1.30%	New
Independent	Apinder Singh	249	0.55%	New
Margin of victory		4,406	9.66%	▲4.43
Turnout		45,597	66.56%	▼6.29
Registered electors		69,275		▲12.85
JP gain from INC		Swing	▼18.86	

=== Assembly Election 1972 ===
1972 Haryana Legislative Assembly election: Sirsa
Party	Candidate	Votes	%	±%
INC	Premsukh Dass	22,205	50.16%	▼3.01
Independent	Lachhman Dass Arora	19,889	44.93%	
Independent	Birbal Ram	2,170	4.90%	
Margin of victory		2,316	5.23%	▼12.20
Turnout		44,264	73.67%	▲11.10
Registered electors		61,387		▲11.52
INC hold		Swing		

=== Assembly Election 1968 ===
1968 Haryana Legislative Assembly election: Sirsa
Party	Candidate	Votes	%	±%
INC	Prem Sukh Dass	17,856	53.17%	▲15.73
Independent	Sushil Chander	12,001	35.74%	
SSP	Dhanpat Rai	1,456	4.34%	▼2.58
ABJS	Ranbir Singh	1,240	3.69%	▼47.56
Independent	Prem Chander	603	1.80%	
Independent	Began	425	1.27%	
Margin of victory		5,855	17.44%	▲3.63
Turnout		33,581	62.49%	▼6.23
Registered electors		55,044		▲0.87
INC gain from ABJS		Swing	▲1.92	

=== Assembly Election 1967 ===
1967 Haryana Legislative Assembly election: Sirsa
Party	Candidate	Votes	%	±%
ABJS	L. Dass	18,805	51.25%	
INC	S. Ram	13,738	37.44%	
SSP	S. Lal	2,539	6.92%	
Independent	M. Partap	1,612	4.39%	
Margin of victory		5,067	13.81%	
Turnout		36,694	69.78%	
Registered electors		54,570		
ABJS win (new seat)				

== See also ==
- List of constituencies of the Haryana Legislative Assembly
- Sirsa district
