= Taruana =

- Village
- Location within Haryana Location within India
- Coordinates: 29.824859°N 75.011387°E
- Established: Around 1400

Population (2011)
  - Total: 2,573
- Time zone: UTC+05:30 (IST)
- Sex Ratio: 933
- Child Sex Ratio (0-6 yrs): 830
- Official language: Hindi
- Current Sarpanch: Kamaljeet Kaur Sidhu w/o Jaspal Singh Sidhu
- Nearest City: Kalanwali
- District: Sirsa

Taruana is a village near Kalanwali in Sirsa district, Haryana, India.

== History ==
There is no documented history on Taruana, but according to oral history, it was founded by Sardar Taru Singh Sidhu, who named it Taruana.

== Transport facility ==
=== Bus facility ===
As the village is on MDR 101A road (Kalanwali to Rori), transport, including by bus, is easily accessible. Kalanwali is just 3 km (1.9 mi) away from Taruana and from Kalanwali Bus Stand one can easily get busses for long routes. On the other hand, Sirsa (District HQ) is also just 30 km (19 mi) away. By bus it takes only one hour to reach Sirsa.

=== Train facility ===
Since no train track crosses the village, there is no train station within the village, but from Kalanwali, there is easy access to trains.

== Education ==
The village has good educational facilities. For primary education, there are two schools: one for girls and other for boys. For higher education, the village has a government high school that provides education up to secondary level.

Schooling had previously gone up to eighth class, but was extended up to tenth blass in 2003. The 2003–2004 batch was the first ninth-class batch in the school.

Higher education has always been a problem for not only Taruana, but also all the villages in this area, for girls since 2019. An all-girls' college is being founded in Taruana. After 12th class, students have to travel long distances for their education. Boys manage but it becomes very difficult for girls to travel 50 km daily, making it hard for them to pursue higher education in the area.

== Religion ==
Most of the natives of this village are Sikhs, although there are also few Brahmans. A Gurudwara Sahib is located at the north end of the village. People go to Gurudwara Sahib every morning to be a part of the morning Ardas. Apart from Gurudwara Sahib, there is a Dera of Baba Sarabh Dyal Ji. Baba Sarabh Dyal Ji was a famous saint.

== Jatt Sikh Gotras ==
The village primarily has three gotras i.e. Sidhu, Dhaliwal and Mann. 80 percent of Jats are Sidhus, while the rest are Dhaliwals and Manns. There are two to three houses of Bhullar gotra also.

== Medical facility ==
Taruana does not have any dispensaries or hospitals.

== Post office ==
Taruana has a post office, which was established in 1993. Since then, it has served the villagers under the control of BPM Gurmail Singh Sidhu.

Apart from basic mail services, the post office also provides other services like bill payment, saving accounts, and fixed deposits.
