= Ratia Assembly constituency =

Legislative Assembly constituency in Haryana State, India

Coordinates: 29.68°N 75.58°E

Ratia
- Constituency No. 41 for the Haryana Legislative Assembly

Constituency details
- Country: India
- Region: North India
- State: Haryana
- District: Fatehabad
- Lok Sabha constituency: Sirsa
- Total electors: 2,27,040
- Reservation: SC

Member of Legislative Assembly
- 15th Haryana Legislative Assembly
- Incumbent Jarnail Singh
- Party: Indian National Congress
- Elected year: 2024

Ratia is one of the 90 Legislative Assembly constituencies of Haryana state in India.

It is part of Fatehabad district and is reserved for candidates belonging to the Scheduled Castes. Jarnail Singh is the incumbent MLA.

== Members of the Legislative Assembly ==
Year	Member	Party
1977	Peer Chand	Janata Party
1982	Neki Ram	Indian National Congress
1987	Atma Singh	Lokdal
1991	Peer Chand	Haryana Vikas Party
1996	Ramswaroop Ram	Haryana Vikas Party
2000	Jarnail Singh	Indian National Lok Dal
2005	Gian Chand	Indian National Lok Dal
2009	Gian Chand	Indian National Lok Dal
2011^	Jarnail Singh	Indian National Congress
2014	Ravinder Baliala	Indian National Lok Dal
2019	Lakshman Napa	Bharatiya Janata Party
2024	Jarnail Singh	Indian National Congress

== Election results ==
=== Assembly Election 2024 ===
2024 Haryana Legislative Assembly election: Ratia
Party	Candidate	Votes	%	±%
INC	Jarnail Singh	86,426	52.54%	▲18.34
BJP	Sunita Duggal	64,984	39.50%	▲4.54
INLD	Ramsarup Rama	5,769	3.51%	New
AAP	Mukhtyar Singh Bazigar	3,280	1.99%	New
JJP	Ramesh	1,000	0.61%	▼18.35
NOTA	None of the Above	1,050	0.64%	▼0.05
Margin of victory		21,442	13.03%	▲12.26
Turnout		1,64,504	72.31%	▼1.14
Registered electors		2,27,040		▲5.92
INC gain from BJP		Swing	▲17.57	

=== Assembly Election 2019 ===
2019 Haryana Legislative Assembly election: Ratia
Party	Candidate	Votes	%	±%
BJP	Lakshman Napa	55,160	34.97%	▲2.83
INC	Jarnail Singh	53,944	34.20%	▲10.83
JJP	Manju Bala	29,909	18.96%	New
SAD	Kulvinder Singh	9,965	6.32%	New
Independent	Surender Kumar	1,301	0.82%	New
BSP	Balwan Singh	1,244	0.79%	▲0.12
NOTA	Nota	1,086	0.69%	▲0.14
Margin of victory		1,216	0.77%	▲0.48
Turnout		1,57,748	73.45%	▼6.94
Registered electors		2,14,770		▲9.98
BJP gain from INLD		Swing	▲2.54	

=== Assembly Election 2014 ===
2014 Haryana Legislative Assembly election: Ratia
Party	Candidate	Votes	%	±%
INLD	Prof. Ravinder Baliala	50,905	32.43%	▼7.28
BJP	Sunita Duggal	50,452	32.14%	▲25.11
INC	Jarnail Singh	36,681	23.37%	▼13.66
HJC(BL)	Ram Saroop Rama	6,430	4.10%	▼2.52
HLP	Angrej Singh	5,259	3.35%	New
CPI(M)	Dalbir Singh	1,849	1.18%	▼0.54
BSP	Mange Ram Dahiya	1,047	0.67%	▼2.55
NOTA	None of the Above	854	0.54%	New
Margin of victory		453	0.29%	▼2.39
Turnout		1,56,987	80.39%	▲2.38
Registered electors		1,95,275		▲20.77
INLD hold		Swing	▼7.28	

=== Assembly Election 2009 ===
2009 Haryana Legislative Assembly election: Ratia
Party	Candidate	Votes	%	±%
INLD	Gian Chand	50,095	39.71%	▲1.87
INC	Jarnail Singh S/O Hakam Singh	46,713	37.03%	▲9.57
BJP	Mahavir Parshad	8,865	7.03%	▼6.13
HJC(BL)	Mangat Ram	8,341	6.61%	New
BSP	Amarjeet Kaur	4,053	3.21%	▲2.05
CPI(M)	Bira Ram	2,173	1.72%	New
Independent	Gurdeep Singh	2,044	1.62%	New
Independent	Surender Kumar	1,310	1.04%	New
Independent	Manjeet	892	0.71%	New
Independent	Jaginder Singh	728	0.58%	New
Margin of victory		3,382	2.68%	▼7.70
Turnout		1,26,149	78.02%	▲1.92
Registered electors		1,61,695		▲27.14
INLD hold		Swing	▲1.87	

=== Assembly Election 2005 ===
2005 Haryana Legislative Assembly election: Ratia
Party	Candidate	Votes	%	±%
INLD	Gian Chand	36,623	37.84%	▼9.25
INC	Gurdeep Singh	26,572	27.46%	▲20.32
Independent	Mangat Ram	18,934	19.56%	New
BJP	Ladu Ram	12,736	13.16%	New
BSP	Rajender Kumar	1,121	1.16%	New
Independent	Nirmal Singh	783	0.81%	New
Margin of victory		10,051	10.39%	▼16.79
Turnout		96,781	76.10%	▲6.14
Registered electors		1,27,181		▲9.61
INLD hold		Swing	▼9.25	

=== Assembly Election 2000 ===
2000 Haryana Legislative Assembly election: Ratia
Party	Candidate	Votes	%	±%
INLD	Jarnail Singh S/O Hakam Singh	38,224	47.09%	New
Independent	Mahabir Parshad	16,169	19.92%	New
Independent	Atma Singh Gill	13,729	16.91%	New
INC	Jagdish Mistri	5,794	7.14%	▼6.85
Independent	Ram Sarup Rama	4,267	5.26%	New
Independent	Sudesh Kumar Papla	1,041	1.28%	New
CPI	Piyara Singh	609	0.75%	▼0.65
Margin of victory		22,055	27.17%	▲13.85
Turnout		81,168	70.77%	▼2.54
Registered electors		1,16,027		▲4.55
INLD gain from HVP		Swing	▲12.23	

=== Assembly Election 1996 ===
1996 Haryana Legislative Assembly election: Ratia
Party	Candidate	Votes	%	±%
HVP	Ram Saroop Rama	28,044	34.86%	▲14.09
SAP	Atma Singh	17,327	21.54%	New
Independent	Mahabir Prashad	12,138	15.09%	New
INC	Gian Chand	11,255	13.99%	▲0.44
Independent	Baldev Singh S/O Kartar Singh	3,227	4.01%	New
Independent	Nikra Singh	1,342	1.67%	New
Independent	Gurbax Singh	1,125	1.40%	New
CPI	Ajmer Singh	1,123	1.40%	New
Independent	Bheera Singh	687	0.85%	New
Independent	Ram Lal	626	0.78%	New
Independent	Daya Singh	471	0.59%	New
Margin of victory		10,717	13.32%	▲11.34
Turnout		80,453	76.27%	▲10.06
Registered electors		1,10,973		▲8.57
HVP hold		Swing	▲14.09	

=== Assembly Election 1991 ===
1991 Haryana Legislative Assembly election: Ratia
Party	Candidate	Votes	%	±%
HVP	Pir Chand	13,255	20.77%	New
BJP	Ram Sarup S/O Sadhu	11,988	18.78%	New
JP	Atma Singh	11,502	18.02%	New
INC	Chabil Das	8,646	13.55%	▼20.12
Independent	Gyan Chand	4,028	6.31%	New
Independent	Piyara Singh	3,775	5.92%	New
Independent	Karnail Singh	3,670	5.75%	New
CPI(M)	Ajmer Singh	2,607	4.08%	New
BSP	Ramesh Kumar	2,142	3.36%	New
Independent	Baldev Singh	429	0.67%	New
Independent	Ganda Singh	366	0.57%	New
Margin of victory		1,267	1.99%	▼25.94
Turnout		63,819	65.81%	▼10.81
Registered electors		1,02,209		▲14.60
HVP gain from LKD		Swing	▼40.82	

=== Assembly Election 1987 ===
1987 Haryana Legislative Assembly election: Ratia
Party	Candidate	Votes	%	±%
LKD	Atama Singh	40,242	61.59%	▲24.47
INC	Pir Chand	21,995	33.67%	▼3.89
Independent	Ram Sarup	976	1.49%	New
Independent	Bahal Singh	854	1.31%	New
Independent	Raj Kumar	455	0.70%	New
Independent	Piru Ram	389	0.60%	New
Independent	Ganda Singh	267	0.41%	New
Margin of victory		18,247	27.93%	▲27.50
Turnout		65,334	74.73%	▲10.86
Registered electors		89,189		▲20.50
LKD gain from INC		Swing	▲24.04	

=== Assembly Election 1982 ===
1982 Haryana Legislative Assembly election: Ratia
Party	Candidate	Votes	%	±%
INC	Neki Ram	17,342	37.55%	▲9.66
LKD	Atma Singh	17,144	37.12%	New
JP	Ram Sarup S/O Sadhu	8,163	17.68%	▼19.12
Independent	Hansa Ram	840	1.82%	New
Independent	Ram Chander Dahiya	660	1.43%	New
Independent	Surja Ram	529	1.15%	New
Independent	Balbir Singh	380	0.82%	New
Independent	Lal Chand	294	0.64%	New
Margin of victory		198	0.43%	▼8.47
Turnout		46,182	63.80%	▲8.33
Registered electors		74,015		▲20.72
INC gain from JP		Swing	▲0.75	

=== Assembly Election 1977 ===
1977 Haryana Legislative Assembly election: Ratia
Party	Candidate	Votes	%	±%
JP	Pir Chand	12,197	36.80%	New
INC	Sheopal	9,246	27.89%	New
Independent	Jeeta Ram	5,874	17.72%	New
Independent	Hakim Singh	2,303	6.95%	New
Independent	Atma Singh	1,268	3.83%	New
CPI	Ajmer Singh	623	1.88%	New
Independent	Balu Ram	526	1.59%	New
Independent	Ram Chander Dahiya	513	1.55%	New
Independent	Surja Ram	401	1.21%	New
Margin of victory		2,951	8.90%	
Turnout		33,146	54.92%	
Registered electors		61,309		
JP win (new seat)				

== See also ==
- List of constituencies of the Haryana Legislative Assembly
- Fatehabad district
