= Fatehabad, Haryana Assembly constituency =

Legislative Assembly constituency in Haryana State, India

Coordinates: 29.51°N 75.45°E

Fatehabad
- Constituency No. 40 for the Haryana Legislative Assembly

Constituency details
- Country: India
- Region: North India
- State: Haryana
- District: Fatehabad
- Lok Sabha constituency: Sirsa
- Total electors: 2,58,415
- Reservation: None

Member of Legislative Assembly
- 15th Haryana Legislative Assembly
- Incumbent Balwan Singh Daulatpuria
- Party: Indian National Congress
- Elected year: 2024

Fatehabad is one of the 90 Legislative Assembly constituencies of Haryana state in India. Balwan Singh Daulatpuria is the incumbent MLA from the constituency.

The constituency is part of Fatehabad district.

== Members of the Legislative Assembly ==
Year	Member	Party
1967	Gobind Rai	Indian National Congress
1968	Pokhar Ram	Indian National Congress
1972	Pokhar Ram	Indian National Congress
1977	Harphool Singh	Janata Party
1982	Gobind Rai	Indian National Congress
1987	Balbir Singh Choudhary	Bharatiya Janata Party
1991	Lila Krishan	Indian National Congress
1996	Harminder Singh	Haryana Vikas Party
2000	Lila Krishan	Indian National Lok Dal
2005	Dura Ram Bishnoi	Indian National Congress
2009	Prahlad Singh Gillan Khera	Independent
2014	Balwan Singh Daulatpuria	Indian National Lok Dal
2019	Dura Ram Bishnoi	Bharatiya Janata Party
2024	Balwan Singh Daulatpuria	Indian National Congress

== Election results ==
=== Assembly Election 2024 ===
2024 Haryana Legislative Assembly election: Fatehabad
Party	Candidate	Votes	%	±%
INC	Balwan Singh Daulatpuria	86,172	44.13%	▲32.79
BJP	Dura Ram	83,920	42.98%	▲1.00
INLD	Sunaina Chautala	9,681	4.96%	▲3.81
Independent	Rajender Choudhary Urf Kaka	5,816	2.98%	New
JJP	Subhash Chander Gorchhia	3,249	1.66%	▼38.52
AAP	Kamal Bisla	2,803	1.44%	▲0.08
NOTA	None of the Above	718	0.37%	New
Margin of victory		2,252	1.15%	▼0.64
Turnout		1,95,276	75.40%	▼1.36
Registered electors		2,58,415		▲7.85
INC gain from BJP		Swing	▲2.15	

=== Assembly Election 2019 ===
2019 Haryana Legislative Assembly election: Fatehabad
Party	Candidate	Votes	%	±%
BJP	Dura Ram	77,369	41.97%	▲27.23
JJP	Dr. Virender Siwach	74,069	40.18%	
INC	Prahlad Singh Gillan Khera	20,898	11.34%	▼2.37
BSP	Zile Singh Verma	3,137	1.70%	▲1.16
AAP	Laxay Garg	2,493	1.35%	
INLD	Suman Lata	2,111	1.15%	▼31.54
Margin of victory		3,300	1.79%	▼0.10
Turnout		1,84,327	76.76%	▼7.19
Registered electors		2,40,130		▲8.86
BJP gain from INLD		Swing	▲9.28	

=== Assembly Election 2014 ===
2014 Haryana Legislative Assembly election: Fatehabad
Party	Candidate	Votes	%	±%
INLD	Balwan Singh Daulatpuria	60,539	32.69%	▲7.32
HJC(BL)	Dura Ram	57,034	30.80%	▲25.8
BJP	Swatantar Bala Chaudhary	27,305	14.74%	▲13.77
INC	Prahlad Singh Gillan Khera	25,387	13.71%	▼17.27
HLP	Deepak Bhirdana	3,801	2.05%	
Republican Backward Congress	Bhim Singh	1,367	0.74%	
Independent	Darbara Singh	1,351	0.73%	
Independent	Angad Dhingsara	1,298	0.70%	
CPI(M)	Mohan Lal Narang	1,199	0.65%	▼0.57
BSP	Dr. Sushil Indora	996	0.54%	
Margin of victory		3,505	1.89%	▼0.00
Turnout		1,85,190	83.95%	▲3.01
Registered electors		2,20,594		▲20.66
INLD gain from Independent		Swing	▼0.18	

=== Assembly Election 2009 ===
2009 Haryana Legislative Assembly election: Fatehabad
Party	Candidate	Votes	%	±%
Independent	Prahlad Singh Gillan Khera	48,637	32.87%	
INC	Dura Ram	45,835	30.97%	▼17.97
INLD	Swatantar Bala Chaudhary	37,536	25.37%	▼15.05
HJC(BL)	Ran Singh Beniwal	7,396	5.00%	
CPI(M)	Comred Ram Sarup	1,798	1.22%	▼3.42
BJP	Bhisham Pitamah	1,438	0.97%	▼1.55
Independent	Satbir Singh	1,233	0.83%	
Independent	Maharana Partap	948	0.64%	
Smast Bhartiya Party	Narender Kumar Urf Billu	853	0.58%	
Margin of victory		2,802	1.89%	▼6.63
Turnout		1,47,977	80.94%	▲1.62
Registered electors		1,82,826		▲16.33
Independent gain from INC		Swing	▼16.07	

=== Assembly Election 2005 ===
2005 Haryana Legislative Assembly election: Fatehabad
Party	Candidate	Votes	%	±%
INC	Dura Ram	61,011	48.94%	▲22.73
INLD	Swatantar Bala Chaudhary	50,386	40.42%	▼9.56
CPI(M)	Comrade Krishan Swarup	5,772	4.63%	▼9.08
BJP	Durgesh Arora	3,147	2.52%	
BSP	Gurmeet Singh	1,157	0.93%	▼0.42
Independent	Vishnu Dutt	941	0.75%	
BRP	Saudagar Singh	846	0.68%	
Margin of victory		10,625	8.52%	▼15.25
Turnout		1,24,663	79.32%	▲15.09
Registered electors		1,57,160		▲14.38
INC gain from INLD		Swing	▼1.04	

=== Assembly Election 2000 ===
2000 Haryana Legislative Assembly election: Fatehabad
Party	Candidate	Votes	%	±%
INLD	Lila Krishan	44,112	49.98%	
INC	Jai Narain	23,133	26.21%	▲6.88
CPI(M)	Comrade Krishan Sawrup	12,099	13.71%	▲6.82
Independent	Prem Chand S/O Kiran Chand	2,666	3.02%	
HVP	Dayawanti Verma	1,568	1.78%	▼36.93
Independent	Ram Gopal	1,418	1.61%	
BSP	Prem Chand S/O Sh. Sadhu Ram	1,192	1.35%	▲0.52
Independent	Murari Lal	784	0.89%	
Independent	Bhagwan Dass	469	0.53%	
Margin of victory		20,979	23.77%	▲4.39
Turnout		88,255	64.23%	▼6.09
Registered electors		1,37,405		▲3.32
INLD gain from HVP		Swing	▲11.27	

=== Assembly Election 1996 ===
1996 Haryana Legislative Assembly election: Fatehabad
Party	Candidate	Votes	%	±%
HVP	Harminder Singh	36,199	38.71%	
INC	Lila Krishan	18,078	19.33%	▼12.95
SAP	Sharad Kumar	15,572	16.65%	
Independent	Ram Raj	8,766	9.37%	
CPI(M)	Prithvi Singh Gorkhpuria	6,442	6.89%	▼18.64
Independent	Mahender Singh	1,454	1.55%	
Independent	Mukhthar Singh Sadar	1,103	1.18%	
Independent	Raj Kumar S/O Nikka Ram	878	0.94%	
BSP	Harbans Kaur	774	0.83%	▼4.23
Independent	Puran Chand	711	0.76%	
Margin of victory		18,121	19.38%	▲12.62
Turnout		93,517	73.94%	▲5.36
Registered electors		1,32,988		▲12.08
HVP gain from INC		Swing	▲6.43	

=== Assembly Election 1991 ===
1991 Haryana Legislative Assembly election: Fatehabad
Party	Candidate	Votes	%	±%
INC	Lila Krishan	24,883	32.28%	▲19.26
CPI(M)	Prithvi Singh Gorkhpuria	19,675	25.53%	▲5.52
JP	Ram Raj Mehta	13,614	17.66%	
Independent	Ranjeet Singh	5,108	6.63%	
BJP	Atem Parkash	4,744	6.15%	▼52.36
BSP	Mukhthar Singh Sadar	3,897	5.06%	
Independent	Joginder Singh	1,289	1.67%	
Independent	Sham Lal Rathi	612	0.79%	
Independent	Mohinder Kumar S/O Amrit Datta	477	0.62%	
Margin of victory		5,208	6.76%	▼31.76
Turnout		77,080	67.45%	▼4.62
Registered electors		1,18,655		▲11.12
INC gain from BJP		Swing	▼26.24	

=== Assembly Election 1987 ===
1987 Haryana Legislative Assembly election: Fatehabad
Party	Candidate	Votes	%	±%
BJP	Balbir Singh Choudhary	43,479	58.52%	
CPI(M)	Prithvi Singh Gorkhpuria	14,864	20.01%	
INC	Lila Krishan Chaudhary	9,679	13.03%	▼35.34
Independent	Mukhthar Singh Sadar	2,495	3.36%	
Independent	Kaka Ram	1,169	1.57%	
Independent	Amar Singh	744	1.00%	
Independent	Madan Lal	478	0.64%	
Independent	Pratap Singh	386	0.52%	
Margin of victory		28,615	38.51%	▲23.55
Turnout		74,301	70.81%	▲0.17
Registered electors		1,06,780		▲23.12
BJP gain from INC		Swing	▲10.15	

=== Assembly Election 1982 ===
1982 Haryana Legislative Assembly election: Fatehabad
Party	Candidate	Votes	%	±%
INC	Gobind Rai	29,118	48.37%	
LKD	Harminder Singh	20,112	33.41%	
Independent	Harphool Singh	5,990	9.95%	
Independent	Mani Ram Chhapola	1,417	2.35%	
Independent	Tek Chand	891	1.48%	
Independent	Narotam Kumar	543	0.90%	
Independent	Manrup	504	0.84%	
Independent	Ram Richpal	350	0.58%	
Independent	Hans Raj	337	0.56%	
Independent	Ram Singh	324	0.54%	
Margin of victory		9,006	14.96%	▲14.68
Turnout		60,200	70.89%	▲1.33
Registered electors		86,731		▲21.77
INC gain from JP		Swing	▲19.78	

=== Assembly Election 1977 ===
1977 Haryana Legislative Assembly election: Fatehabad
Party	Candidate	Votes	%	±%
JP	Harphool Singh	13,863	28.59%	
Independent	Lila Krishan	13,726	28.31%	
Independent	Harminder Singh	10,737	22.14%	
Independent	Prithvi Singh Gorkhpuria	4,723	9.74%	
VHP	Pratap Singh	3,221	6.64%	
Independent	Tek Chand	1,416	2.92%	
Independent	Udmi Ram	439	0.91%	
Independent	Manrup	308	0.64%	
Margin of victory		137	0.28%	▼13.38
Turnout		48,493	68.96%	▼6.56
Registered electors		71,228		▼3.93
JP gain from INC		Swing	▼27.29	

=== Assembly Election 1972 ===
1972 Haryana Legislative Assembly election: Fatehabad
Party	Candidate	Votes	%	±%
INC	Pokhar Ram	30,925	55.88%	▼1.34
Independent	Gobind Rai	23,366	42.22%	
Independent	Rattan Singh	1,049	1.90%	
Margin of victory		7,559	13.66%	▼0.79
Turnout		55,340	76.76%	▲11.16
Registered electors		74,145		▲12.08
INC hold		Swing		

=== Assembly Election 1968 ===
1968 Haryana Legislative Assembly election: Fatehabad
Party	Candidate	Votes	%	±%
INC	Pokhar Ram	24,029	57.22%	▼4.5
Independent	Lila Krishan	17,963	42.78%	New
Margin of victory		6,066	14.45%	▼21.16
Turnout		41,992	65.52%	▼2.37
Registered electors		66,156		▲17.77
INC hold		Swing		

=== Assembly Election 1967 ===
1967 Haryana Legislative Assembly election: Fatehabad
Party	Candidate	Votes	%	±%
INC	Gobind Rai	22,830	61.73%	New
Independent	M. Ram	9,660	26.12%	New
Independent	B. Singh	8,422	22.77%	New
ABJS	K. Ram	1,253	3.39%	New
CPI	N. Dass	1,069	2.89%	New
RPI	Manohar	362	0.98%	New
Margin of victory		13,170	35.61%	
Turnout		36,985	70.08%	
Registered electors		56,174		
INC win (new seat)				

== See also ==
- List of constituencies of the Haryana Legislative Assembly
- Fatehabad district
