= Balwan =

Balwan is a given name. Notable people with the name include:

- Balwan Singh (born 1973), Indian Army officer
- Balwan Singh Daulatpuria (fl. 2014), Indian politician
- Balwan Poonia (fl. 2018), Indian politician

== See also ==
- Balwaan
