= Lakshman Napa =

Indian politician

Member of the Haryana Legislative Assembly
- In office 2019–2024
- Preceded by: Ravinder Baliala
- Succeeded by: Jarnail Singh
- Constituency: Ratia

Personal details
- Party: Bharatiya Janata Party
- Other political affiliations: Indian National Congress (2024–2026)

Lakshman Napa is an Indian politician from Haryana. He was elected to the Haryana Legislative Assembly from Ratia in the 2019 Haryana Legislative Assembly election as a member of the Bharatiya Janata Party (BJP).

In 2024, Napa left the BJP after being denied a ticket for the Haryana Legislative Assembly election and joined the Indian National Congress. In May 2026, he rejoined the BJP at a public event in Uklana, Haryana, in the presence of state BJP president Mohan Lal Badoli and other party leaders.
