= Dalbir Singh (Haryana politician) =

Indian politician and cabinet minister

Chaudhary Dalbir Singh
- चौधरी दलबीर सिंह

Member of Parliament, Lok Sabha
- In office 1980–1988
- Preceded by: Chand Ram
- Succeeded by: Het Ram
- In office 1967–1977
- Preceded by: Daljit Singh
- Succeeded by: Chand Ram
- Constituency: Sirsa

Member of the Punjab Legislative Assembly
- In office 1952–1962
- Constituency: Tohana

President, Haryana Pradesh Congress Committee
- In office 3 November 1979 – 10 June 1980
- Preceded by: Sultan Singh
- Succeeded by: Sardar Harpal Singh

Personal details
- Born: 5 March 1926 Parbhuwala, Punjab, British India
- Died: 30 October 1987 (aged 61) New Delhi, India
- Party: INC
- Spouse: Kalawati Bhankhor
- Children: 2, including Selja Kumari
- As of 22 June, 2016

Chaudhary Dalbir Singh (1926–1987) was an India politician and cabinet minister. He was a former member of parliament from Sirsa constituency. He was an Indian National Congress politician.

== Early life ==
Chaudhary Dalbir Singh was born in a Chamar family to Kani Ram and Kalawati at Prabhuwala, Punjab, British India. His family was influenced by the Arya Samaj movement.

He attended D.A.V College, Lahore after a suggestion by Ram Singh, his brother-in-law who was posted there as a Panchayat Officer. He later befriended Chaudhary Chand Ram but was forced to move due to the Partition of India. Singh completed his graduation from Govt. College, Rohtak. He was then offered a job as a block development officer but declined.

His daughter, Kumari Selja, is a prominent Dalit leader from INC. She is a former M.P from Ambala and Sirsa, as well as the Union Minister and Joint-Secretary of AIMC.

== Politics ==
- He was a member of the 4th, 5th and 7th Lok Sabha of India from Sirsa.
- He also got elected from Tohana Constituency in 1952 elections but his election was set aside on the pretext of being under age. In the 1957 Punjab general election he was elected from Hansi constituency.
- He was Deputy Minister for Irrigation (1957–1962), Deputy Union Minister for Petroleum & Chemicals (1971–1973), Heavy Industries (1973–1974), Works & Housing (1974–1975) and Shipping and Transport (1975–1977). He was also Minister of state for Petroleum, Chemicals & Fertilizers (1980–1982) and Energy – Petroleum (1982–1983) and Dept. of Coal (1983–1984).
- He was president of Haryana Pradesh Congress Committee and General Secretary of AICC.

== See also ==
- Chamar
