= MDLR Airlines =

Indian airline

Coordinates: 28°27′30.8″N 77°2′3.9″E

IATA	ICAO	Call sign
9H	MDL	MDLR
- Founded: 2007; 19 years ago
- Commenced operations: 14 March 2007; 19 years ago
- Ceased operations: 5 November 2009; 16 years ago
- Hubs: Delhi
- Secondary hubs: Ranchi
- Frequent-flyer program: MDLR One
- Fleet size: 3
- Destinations: 6
- Parent company: MDLR GROUP
- Headquarters: Gurgaon, Haryana, India
- Key people: Gopal Goyal (Chairman)
- Website: www.mdlrairlines.in (defunct)

MDLR Airlines was an airline based in Gurgaon, Haryana, India. It operated scheduled domestic services. It suspended its operations from 5 November 2009.

== History ==
The airline started operations on 14 March 2007, was wholly owned by Murli Dhar Lakh Ram (MDLR) Group, and had around 250 employees by September 2008. The group originated in Sirsa, Haryana in northern India. It was started by Gopal Kanda, a local politician. The airline was started in the middle of a major growth period for Indian aviation but was launched just as oil prices were climbing. It tried the full-service model promising its passengers 'pure vegetarian food', but missed lease payments to BAe for their Avro RJ70 aircraft.

== Destinations ==
MDLR Airlines operated scheduled services to the following domestic destinations (as of April 2009):

=== India ===
Country (state)	City	Airport	Notes	Ref.
India (Bihar)	Gaya	Gaya Airport	Terminated	
India (Chandigarh)	Chandigarh	Chandigarh Airport		
India (National Capital Region)	Delhi	Indira Gandhi International Airport	Hub	
India (Goa)	Goa	Goa International Airport		
India (Jharkhand)	Jamshedpur	Sonari Airport		
India (Jharkhand)	Ranchi	Birsa Munda Airport	Secondary hub	
India (West Bengal)	Kolkata	Netaji Subhas Chandra Bose International Airport		

== Fleet ==
The MDLR Airlines fleet included the following aircraft (at September 2008):

MDLR Airlines fleet
Aircraft	Total	Passengers			Notes
Aircraft	Total	C	Y	Total	Notes
Avro RJ-70	3	6	64	70	VT-MDL, VT-MDM, VT-MDN

== See also ==
- List of airlines of India
