= Makhan Lal Singla =

Indian politician (born 1949)

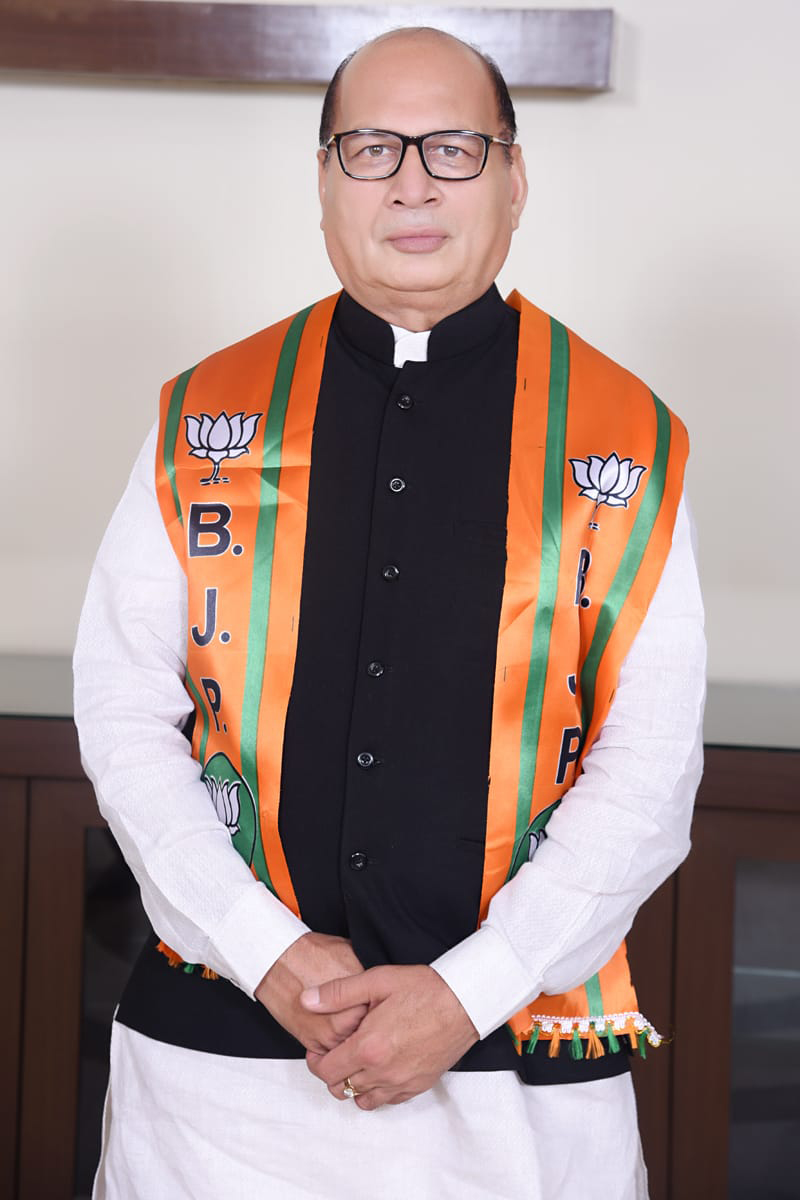

Member of the Haryana Legislative Assembly for Sirsa
- In office 10 October 2015 – 6 August 2019
- Preceded by: Gopal Goyal Kanda
- Succeeded by: Gopal Goyal Kanda

Personal details
- Born: 12 January 1949 (age 77)
- Citizenship: India
- Party: BJP (since 2019)
- Other political affiliations: Indian National Lok Dal
- Spouse: Geeta Devi
- Children: 4
- Parent(s): Vilayati Ram, Shanti Devi

Makhan Lal Singla is a former member of the Haryana Legislative Assembly representing Sirsa constituency. At present, he is associated with BJP.
