= Parbhuwala =

- Village
- Location in Haryana, India Parbhuwala (India)
- Coordinates: 29.4876554°N 75.9042233°E
- Country: India
- State: Haryana
- District: Hisar

Government
  - Body: Panchyat
  - Sarpanch: Sh.Anil Singh
  - MLA: Anup Dhanak
  - Member of Parliament: Jai Parkash (JP)

Languages
  - Official: Hindi, Haryanvi
- Time zone: UTC+5:30 (IST)
- PIN: 125113
- Telephone code: +911693 23xxxx
- ISO 3166 code: IN-HR
- Vehicle registration: HR 80, HR 20, HR 39
- Nearest city: Uklanamandi, Barwala, Hisar, Narwana, Bhuna, Tohana
- Lok Sabha constituency: Hisar
- Vidhan Sabha constituency: Uklana
- Avg. summer temperature: 32.5 °C (90.5 °F)
- Avg. winter temperature: 17.6 °C (63.7 °F)
- Website: haryana.gov.in

Parbhuwala is a large village in Hisar district, Haryana, India. This village has a total of 1,246 families residing. Parbhuwala has a population of 6,386 as per government records.

== Administration ==
Prabhuwala village is administrated by Sarpanch through its Gram Panchayat, who is elected representative of village as per constitution of India and Panchyati Raj Act.

Particulars	Total	Male	Female
Total No. of Houses	1246		
Population	6386	3366	3020

== Notable persons ==
- Relu Ram Punia, former MLA Barwala
- Chaudhary Dalbir Singh, former Member of Parliament
- Kumari Selja, former Cabinet Minister
