= Devender Singh Babli =

Indian politician

Haryana Legislative Assembly
- In office 24 October 2019 – 8 October 2024
- Preceded by: Subhash Barala
- Succeeded by: Paramvir Singh
- Constituency: Tohana

Personal details
- Party: Bharatiya Janata Party Jananayak Janata Party

Devender Singh Babli is an Indian politician belonging to Bharatiya Janata Party. He was chosen as a Cabinet Minister in the Haryana Government on 28 December 2021. He was elected as a member of the Haryana Legislative Assembly from Tohana on 24 October 2019.

Devender Singh Babli secured 1,00,621 votes and defeated Bharatiya Janata Party candidate and state party chief Subhash Barala by 52,302 votes. The winning margin was the second highest scored by any candidate in the state.

On 28 December 2021, Devender Singh Babli was sworn in as a Cabinet Minister in Haryana.

As a Cabinet Minister, Babli held two portfolios. He had been given the charge of Development and Panchayats department, which was earlier held by Deputy CM Dushyant Chautala and he also heads the Archaeology and Museums department.
