= Atma Singh Gill =

Indian politician (1938–2017)

Member of Parliament, Lok Sabha
- In office 2004–2009
- Preceded by: Sushil Kumar Indora
- Succeeded by: Ashok Tanwar
- Constituency: Sirsa

Personal details
- Born: 12 October 1938 Mintgaumri, Punjab, British India
- Died: 6 November 2017 (aged 79)
- Party: Indian National Congress
- Spouse: Sarjeet Kaur
- Children: 4 sons and 4 daughters
- As of 16 September, 2006

Atma Singh Gill (12 October 1938 – 6 November 2017) was an Indian politician from Haryana. He was member of the 14th Lok Sabha of India from Sirsa constituency of Haryana and was a member of the Indian National Congress.

His son in law Mr. Maghar Singh Bhullar is a former Zila Parishad member from the INLD living in Vill Nezadela Sirsa. Gill died on 6 November 2017, at the age of 79.
