= Gopal Goyal Kanda =

Indian politician

Gopal Kumar Goyal

MLA, Haryana Legislative Assembly
- In office 24 October 2019 – 8 October 2024
- Preceded by: Makhan Lal Singla
- Succeeded by: Gokul Setia
- Constituency: Sirsa
- In office 2009–2014
- Preceded by: Lachhman Dass Arora
- Succeeded by: Makhan Lal Singla
- Constituency: Sirsa

Personal details
- Born: 29 December 1965 (age 60) Sirsa, Punjab (now Haryana), India
- Party: Haryana Lokhit Party
- Spouse: Saraswati Devi
- Children: 1 son and 2 daughters
- Profession: Politician and businessman
- Committees: Committee on Agriculture (Member)
- Portfolio: Former Minister of State for Urban Local Bodies and Home (attached with CM), Former Minister of State for Industries & Commerce (attached with PWM)

Gopal Kumar Goyal (born 29 December 1965), commonly known as Gopal Goyal Kanda, is a businessman and former member of the Haryana Legislative Assembly in India.

Kanda is elected to the legislative assembly of the state of Haryana in 2009 as an Independent representative for the Sirsa constituency. He served for some time as a minister in the Government of Haryana before resigning his post in the wake of legal charges being filed against him. He subsequently founded the Haryana Lokhit Party and stood unsuccessfully as a candidate in the state assembly elections of 2014. In 2019, he again stood as a candidate for elections. He was successful in his attempt and became the MLA for Sirsa. He stood unsuccessfully as a candidate in the state assembly elections of 2024.

== Background ==
Gopal Goyal Kanda was born on 29 December 1965 in Sirsa, Haryana, India, where his father, Murli Dhar Kanda, was a lawyer. His ancestors were market traders and his surname, 'Kanda', refers to the iron weights used by such people. He lived with his family in a two-room apartment above their shop. They had connections with an influential local politician, Om Prakash Chautala, and access to Tara Baba (died 2002), a reclusive local spiritual guru whom Kanda has subsequently done much to promote and venerate.

A school drop-out, according to The Times of India Kanda has been "Electrician, shoe shop owner, real estate broker, industrialist, car dealer, Tara Baba devotee, airline owner and politician". Kanda's early attempts at business in Sirsa – a music shop and various ventures involving shoes – were unsuccessful. In 1997, he moved to Gurgaon to enter the real estate business and was able to exploit legal reforms to become a successful broker and, eventually, developer. According to Yuva Portal by 2005, he also had interests in designer clothing production and was an exporter, as well as owning a hotel in Gurgaon, a casino in Goa and various car dealerships. He launched MDLR Airlines around 2006–2007, but it suspended operations in 2009, after accumulating losses and suffering a 2008 tax raid in which numerous employees were convicted.

Kanda is married to Saraswati Devi and has a son and two daughters. He uses the surname "Kanda" for political and religious purposes, while for business purposes and on official papers his name is Gopal Kumar Goyal.

== Politics ==
Kanda returned to Sirsa in 2006 with an eye to entering politics. He leveraged the local status of the Chautala family and of Tara Baba, in memory of whom he built a large temple complex. It was during the period after Chautala became Chief Minister in 1999 that Kanda's business career had taken off but Chautala's Indian National Lok Dal (INLD) party lost the 2005 general elections in Haryana.

The relationship with the Chautala family soured when they refused to select Kanda as an INLD candidate in the 2009 state assembly elections, believing that he was incapable of winning. Although he was also friendly with significant members of the Indian National Congress (INC), that party, too, refused him a candidacy. Exploiting his religious affiliations with Tara Baba, he contested instead as an independent and defeated the INLD candidate, Padam Jain, by a margin of 6521 votes. He supported the INC, led by Bhupinder Singh Hooda, in the formation of a government. The INC had 40 legislators and needed at least another six to form the government, so Kanda acted as kingmaker and rallied a group of independents in support of Hooda. He was rewarded with a cabinet post and made Minister of State for Home in Haryana. He had at that time ten criminal cases pending against him.

When not bound by the Election Commission of India's Model Code of Conduct, which restricts certain activities during election periods, Kanda regularly provided his constituents with free medicines and access to medical services, along with food, water and school books. Supporters claim that Tara Baba declared him to be his spiritual heir.

== Resignation as minister ==
Kanda was arrested in 2012 and resigned from office in the home ministry in the Government of Haryana. On 5 August 2012, Geetika Sharma, a former air hostess with the MDLR airline had committed suicide. She left two suicide notes. accusing Kanda and an aide of harassment. She also alleged that Kanda was "having an illicit relationship with another woman, Ankita, with whom he has a child". Allegations have been made that before her suicide Kanda sent a letter to Emirates saying that she had been a poor employee and had defaulted on a loan, and her family said that he had sent her threatening e-mails using several identities. Kanda denied the allegations and stated that he had encouraged Sharma by sponsoring her on an MBA course. He also said "She was also made the chairman of the trust which managed an international school at Sirsa."

Delhi Police took him in custody, with charges including abetting the suicide, criminal conspiracy and criminal intimidation, and sending false electronic messages. Haryana chief minister, Bhupinder Singh Hooda, said that his former minister not helping the police in the suicide probe was "unfair".

On 15 February 2013, Geetika's mother, Anuradha Sharma also committed suicide. She chose the same method as her daughter and left a suicide note at the same place as her.

On 4 March 2014, Kanda was granted bail after a charge of sexual exploitation was dropped by the Delhi High Court. Both the police and Geetika Sharma's brother objected to the grant of bail, alleging that medical records had been forged, the freedom would enable witness interference, and that it could prejudice a future trial. Kanda then sought judicial intervention to prevent media from reporting the case. On 25 July 2023, Kanda along with the co-accused Aruna Chadha were acquitted by the Court.

== Return to politics ==
As leader of the Haryana Lokhit Party, which he had formed in May 2014, Kanda contested the 2014 elections in Haryana. He lost to Makhan Lal Singla of the INLD, despite his opponents acknowledging beforehand that his local popularity negated any potential ill effects from the Sharma case.

In October 2016, with the Sharma case still unresolved, Kanda and his brother, Govind, were charged in relation to an investigation into alleged illegal property development in Sirsa. Police had been looking into the matter since 2009. Kanda has had other brushes with the law, including a case from 2000 involving cheque bouncing that was still unresolved in 2014, and a 2007 incident when he was discovered in the company of members of the criminal underworld.

In the 2019 Haryana Legislative Assembly election, Kanda again contested from Sirsa and won, defeating Independent candidate Gokul Setia by a margin of 603 votes.

Later in 2019, he was in the news after photographs of him with Sunita Duggal, the Member of Parliament from Sirsa, and several Independent MLAs surfaced in the media, suggesting his willingness to extend support to the Bharatiya Janata Party (BJP) government in Haryana. The BJP, however, publicly denied seeking or accepting his support.

In the 2024 Indian general election, Gokul Setia, contesting as a Congress candidate, defeated Kanda in the Sirsa constituency by a margin of over 7,000 votes.

== See also ==
- Politics of India
- Suicide in India
