= Ravinder Baliala =

Indian politician

Ravinder Baliala is an Indian politician from the Bharatiya Janata Party. From 2014 to 2019, he was member of the Haryana Legislative Assembly from the Indian National Lok Dal representing Ratia (Vidhan Sabha constituency) of Fatehabad district, Haryana.
