= Shishpal Singh =

Indian politician (born 1979)

Shishpal Singh (born 1979) is an Indian politician from Haryana. He is an MLA from Kalanwali Assembly constituency which is reserved for Scheduled Castes in Sirsa district. He won the 2019 Haryana Legislative Assembly election and 2024 Haryana Legislative Assembly election representing the Indian National Congress.

== Early life and education ==
Shishpal is from Kalanwali, Sirsa district, Haryana. He is the son of Om Prakash. He completed M.A. at Kurukshetra University, Kurukshetra.

== Career ==
Shishpal won from Kalanwali Assembly constituency representing the Indian National Congress in the 2019 Haryana Legislative Assembly election. He polled 53,059 votes and defeated his nearest rival, Rajinder Singh Desujodha of the Shiromani Akali Dal, by a margin of 19,243 votes.
