= Subhash Barala =

Indian politician

Member of Parliament, Rajya Sabha
- Incumbent
- Assumed office 3 April 2024
- Preceded by: D. P. Vats
- Constituency: Haryana

President of Bharatiya Janata Party, Haryana
- In office 2014–2020
- Preceded by: Ram Bilas Sharma
- Succeeded by: O. P. Dhankar

Member of the Haryana Legislative Assembly
- In office 2014–2019
- Preceded by: Paramvir Singh
- Succeeded by: Devender Singh Babli
- Constituency: Tohana

Personal details
- Born: 5 December 1967 (age 58) Dangra, Haryana, India
- Party: Bharatiya Janata Party (BJP)
- Spouse: Mrs. Darshna
- Parent: Chaudhary Ram Nath (father)
- Education: HMS Polytechnic, Bangalore
- Occupation: Politician
- Profession: Civil engineer, agriculturist
- Religion: Hindu

Subhash Barala (born 5 December 1967) is the leader of Bharatiya Janata Party and a Member of the Rajya Sabha, the upper house of the Indian Parliament from Haryana. He is the former president of state unit of the party from (2014–2020) and former member of Haryana Legislative Assembly from Tohana in Fatehabad district.

He lost the Tohana Assembly seat to Jananayak Janata Party candidate, Devender Singh Babli in the Haryana Legislative Assembly 2019 Elections. Devender Singh Babli defeated Subhash Barala by a margin of 52,302 votes which was the second worst defeat faced by any candidate in the state.

== Personal life ==
Barala was born in Dangra village in Tohana tehsil. He completed a diploma in Civil Engineering from HMS Polytechnic in Bengaluru.

== Electoral performance ==
2019 Haryana Legislative Assembly election : Tohana
| Party | Candidate | Votes | % | ±% |
|---|---|---|---|---|
| JJP | Devender Singh Babli | 100,752 | 56.72% | |
| BJP | Subhash Barala | 48,450 | 27.28% | ▼1.29 |
| INC | Paramvir Singh | 16,717 | 9.41% | ▼9.71 |
| BSP | Baljit Bouddh | 2,593 | 1.46% | ▲0.62 |
| AAP | Ajay Kumar | 1,852 | 1.04% | |
| CPI(M) | Comrade Jagtar Singh | 1,334 | 0.75% | |
| INLD | Rajpal Saini | 1,213 | 0.68% | ▼23.89 |
| LSP | Bhim Singh | 1,087 | 0.61% | |
| Margin of victory | | 52,302 | 29.45% | ▲25.46 |
| Turnout | | 1,77,622 | 80.55% | ▼4.67 |
| Registered electors | | 2,20,517 | | ▲8.53 |
| JJP gain from BJP | | Swing | ▲28.16 | |

2014 Haryana Legislative Assembly election: Tohana
| Party | Candidate | Votes | % | ±% |
|---|---|---|---|---|
| BJP | Subhash Barala | 49,462 | 28.57% | ▲20.14 |
| INLD | Nishan Singh | 42,556 | 24.58% | ▼6.62 |
| Independent | Devender Singh Babli | 38,282 | 22.11% | |
| INC | Paramvir Singh | 33,111 | 19.12% | ▼14.87 |
| Independent | Sunita | 1,506 | 0.87% | |
| BSP | Dharamender Gothwal | 1,454 | 0.84% | ▼7.19 |
| HJC(BL) | Ramesh Dulat | 1,008 | 0.58% | ▼3.43 |
| CPI | Chand Singh | 869 | 0.50% | ▼0.5 |
| Margin of victory | | 6,906 | 3.99% | ▲1.19 |
| Turnout | | 1,73,155 | 85.22% | ▲3.28 |
| Registered electors | | 2,03,188 | | ▲21.06 |
| BJP gain from INC | | Swing | ▼5.43 | |

2009 Haryana Legislative Assembly election: Tohana
| Party | Candidate | Votes | % | ±% |
|---|---|---|---|---|
| INC | Paramvir Singh | 46,752 | 33.99% | ▼11.43 |
| INLD | Nishan Singh | 42,900 | 31.19% | ▲2.22 |
| Independent | Roshan Lal | 14,816 | 10.77% | |
| BJP | Subhash Barala | 11,587 | 8.42% | ▼8.53 |
| BSP | Sanjay Sharma | 11,038 | 8.03% | ▲5.11 |
| HJC(BL) | Dheera Ram | 5,521 | 4.01% | |
| CPI | Sampuran Singh | 1,374 | 1.00% | |
| Smast Bhartiya Party | Bajrang | 1,280 | 0.93% | |
| Independent | Subhash Chand | 881 | 0.64% | |
| Independent | Sita Ram | 777 | 0.56% | |
| Margin of victory | | 3,852 | 2.80% | ▼13.65 |
| Turnout | | 1,37,535 | 81.94% | ▲3.51 |
| Registered electors | | 1,67,845 | | ▲15.33 |
| INC hold | | Swing | ▼11.43 | |
