= Gokul Setia =

Indian politician

Member of Haryana Legislative Assembly
- Incumbent
- Assumed office 2024
- Preceded by: Gopal Kanda
- Constituency: Sirsa

Personal details
- Party: Indian National Congress

Gokul Setia is an Indian politician from Haryana. He is currently serving as member of the Haryana Legislative Assembly from 2024, representing Sirsa as an Indian National Congress member. Gokul Setia is the grandson of Laxman Das Arora, a five-time MLA from Sirsa. He is a graduate and professionally involved in business and agriculture.

== Political career ==
Setia first contested the Sirsa Assembly seat in 2019 as an independent candidate but narrowly lost to Gopal Kanda of the Haryana Lokhit Party by 602 votes. In the 2024 Haryana Legislative Assembly elections, he joined the Indian National Congress and won the seat, defeating Kanda by a margin of 7,234 votes, securing a total of 79,020 votes.

== Controversies ==
During his 2024 campaign, photographs surfaced showing Setia with gangster Goldy Brar. Setia stated that the images were from his college days and denied any current association with Brar.
