= Dura Ram =

Indian politician

Dura Ram is an Indian politician from Haryana. He is a nephew of Bhajan Lal and first cousin of Kuldeep Bishnoi and Chander Mohan. He was elected to the Haryana Legislative Assembly from Fatehabad Haryana Assembly Constituency the 2005 Haryana Legislative Assembly Election and 2019 Haryana Legislative Assembly election as a member of the Indian National Congress and Bharatiya Janata Party respectively.

== Career graph ==
- 2005 – MLA Fatehabad
- 2019 – MLA Fatehabad

== See also ==
- Political families of Haryana
- Politics of Haryana
