= Charanjeet Singh Rori =

Indian politician

Member of Parliament, Lok Sabha
- In office 23 May 2014 – 23 May 2019
- Preceded by: Ashok Tanwar
- Succeeded by: Sunita Duggal
- Constituency: Sirsa

Personal details
- Born: 15 September 1969 (age 56) Rori, Sirsa district, Haryana
- Party: Indian National Congress
- Other political affiliations: Indian National Lok Dal
- Occupation: Agriculturist
- As of 15 December, 2016 Source: [Member Profile archived]

Charanjeet Singh Rori was Member of Parliament from the Sirsa Constituency during the 16th Lok Sabha. He was defeated by Sunita Duggal (Member of parliament from 17th Lok Sabha) in 2019, Lok Sabha elections with a margin of 626,258 votes. He defeated sitting MP Dr Ashok Tanwar by 115, 736 votes in 2014 Lok Sabha elections. He is member of the I.N.L.D.(Indian National Lok Dal) Party. He is a prominent leader of Shirmoni Akali Dal. In the 2014 Lok Sabha Elections, Sardar Parkash Singh Badal and Sukhbir Singh Badal campaigned for him. He joined Indian National Congress.

Party political offices
Preceded by	Leader of the Indian National Lok Dal Party in the 16th Lok Sabha; 2014–present	Incumbent
