= Selja Kumari =

Indian politician (born 1962)

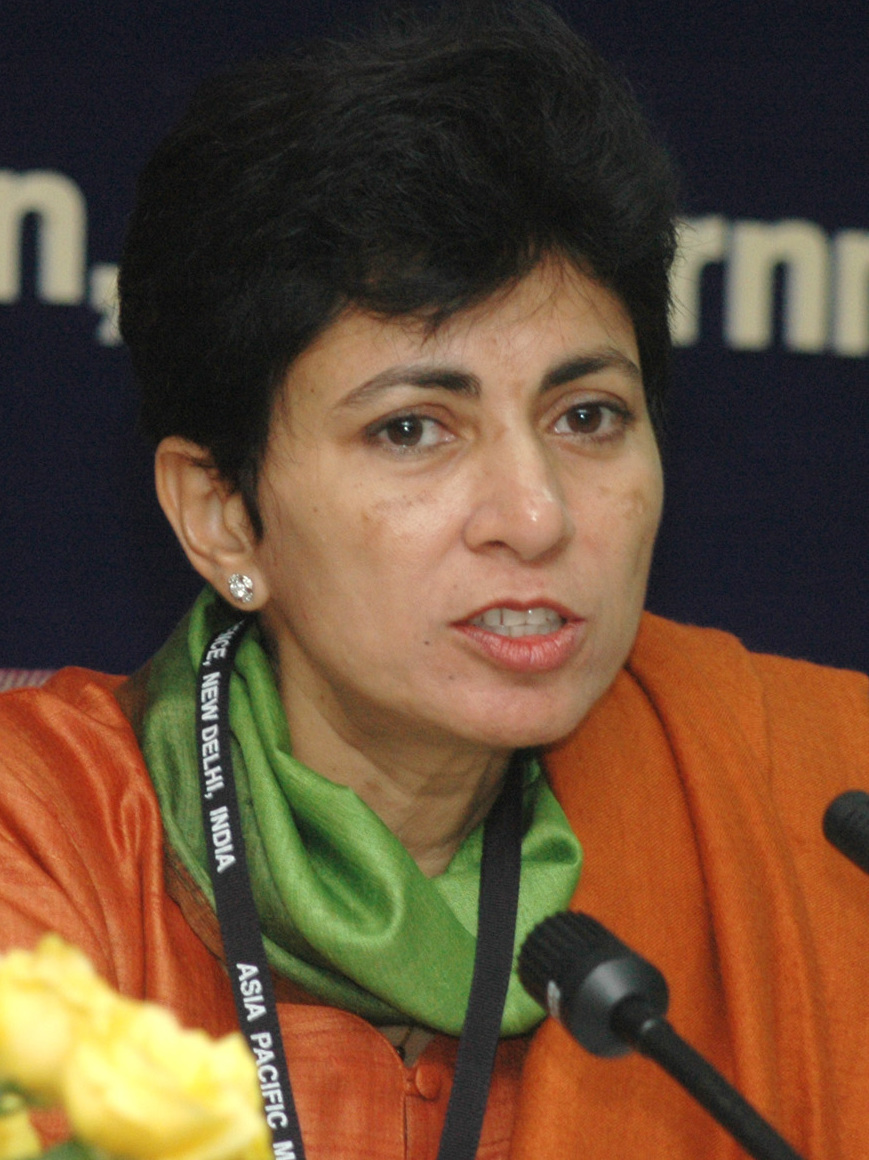
- Selja Kumari in 2024

General Secretary of the AICC Incharge of Uttarakhand Pradesh Congress Committee
- Incumbent
- Assumed office 24 December 2023
- Preceded by: Devender Yadav

Member of Parliament, Lok Sabha
- Incumbent
- Assumed office 4 June 2024
- Preceded by: Sunita Duggal
- Constituency: Sirsa, Haryana
- In office 15 May 2004 – 18 May 2014
- Preceded by: Rattan Lal Kataria
- Succeeded by: Rattan Lal Kataria
- Constituency: Ambala, Haryana
- In office 20 June 1991 – 4 December 1997
- Preceded by: Het Ram
- Succeeded by: Sushil Kumar Indora
- Constituency: Sirsa, Haryana

Member of Panel of Chairpersons (Lok Sabha)
- Incumbent
- Assumed office 1 July 2024 Serving with Sandhya Ray, Dilip Saikia, Jagdambika Pal, Krishna Prasad Tenneti, Kakoli Ghosh Dastidar, A. Raja, P. C. Mohan, Awadhesh Prasad, N. K. Premachandran
- Appointed by: Om Birla

Union Minister of Social Justice and Empowerment
- In office 28 October 2012 – 28 January 2014
- Prime Minister: Manmohan Singh
- Preceded by: Mukul Wasnik
- Succeeded by: Mallikarjun Kharge

Union Minister of Tourism
- In office 28 May 2009 – 19 January 2011
- Prime Minister: Manmohan Singh
- Preceded by: Ambika Soni
- Succeeded by: Subodh Kant Sahay

Union Minister of Housing and Urban Poverty Alleviation
- In office 1 June 2006 – 28 October 2012
- Prime Minister: Manmohan Singh
- Preceded by: Sukhdev Singh Dhindsa
- Succeeded by: Ajay Maken

Union Minister of Urban Employment and Poverty Alleviation
- In office 23 May 2004 – 1 June 2006
- Prime Minister: Manmohan Singh

Union Minister of State for Department of Education and Culture in Ministry of Human Resource Development
- In office 15 September 1995 – 16 May 1996
- Prime Minister: P. V. Narasimha Rao
- Preceded by: Basavarajeshwari
- Succeeded by: Kanti Singh

Union Deputy Minister for Department of Education & Culture in Ministry of Human Resource Development
- In office July 1992 – September 1995
- Prime Minister: P. V. Narasimha Rao

Member of Parliament, Rajya Sabha
- In office 10 April 2014 – 2 April 2020
- Preceded by: Ram Prakash
- Succeeded by: Deepender Singh Hooda
- Constituency: Haryana

President of Haryana Pradesh Congress Committee
- In office 4 September 2019 – 27 April 2022
- Preceded by: Ashok Tanwar
- Succeeded by: Udai Bhan

Personal details
- Born: 24 September 1962 (age 63) Parbhuwala, Punjab, India (present-day Haryana)
- Party: Indian National Congress
- Education: M.A., M.Phil.
- Profession: Agriculturist & Social Worker

Selja Kumari (born 24 September 1962) is an Indian politician and a member of the Lok Sabha, the lower house of Indian parliament. She is a member of the Indian National Congress and has served as the union minister of state (independent charge) for social justice and empowerment and tourism during Manmohan Singh's premiership.

Selja was first elected to the Lok Sabha in 1991 from Sirsa, a constituency that she retained in the 1996 elections. Following her election in 2009 to the Lok Sabha from Ambala, she was appointed the minister of social justice and empowerment. Selja unsuccessfully contested the general elections in 2019 from Ambala, and following that made a return to state politics, being elected the president of the Haryana unit of the Congress party later that year.

She was a member of the Rajya Sabha from 2014 to 2020. In the 2024 Indian general election, she was elected to the Lok Sabha again from the Sirsa constituency.

== Early life and education ==
Selja Kumari was born in a chamar/ravidassia family on 24 September 1962 in Parbhuwala Hisar to Dalbir Singh, who was a politician from the Indian National Congress. She studied at the Convent of Jesus and Mary, New Delhi and later attended the Panjab University, where she completed her master's which is a postgraduate degree.

== Political career ==
=== Early career and electoral debut (1990–2003) ===
Selja began her political career in the Mahila Congress becoming its president in 1990. She was elected to the 10th Lok Sabha in 1991 from Sirsa in Haryana. She was Union Minister of State for Education and Culture in the Narasimha Rao-led Congress government. Despite the Congress debacle in Haryana in 1996, she was re-elected to the 11th Lok Sabha.

Selja began actively participating in international conferences and summits following her election to the 14th Lok Sabha in 2004. She was elected as a member of the governing board of Commonwealth Local Government Forum in 2005. She continued to engage with other such organisations as the Commonwealth Parliamentary Association and also headed the Commonwealth Consultative Group on Human Settlements.

=== Role under UPA governments (2004–2013) ===
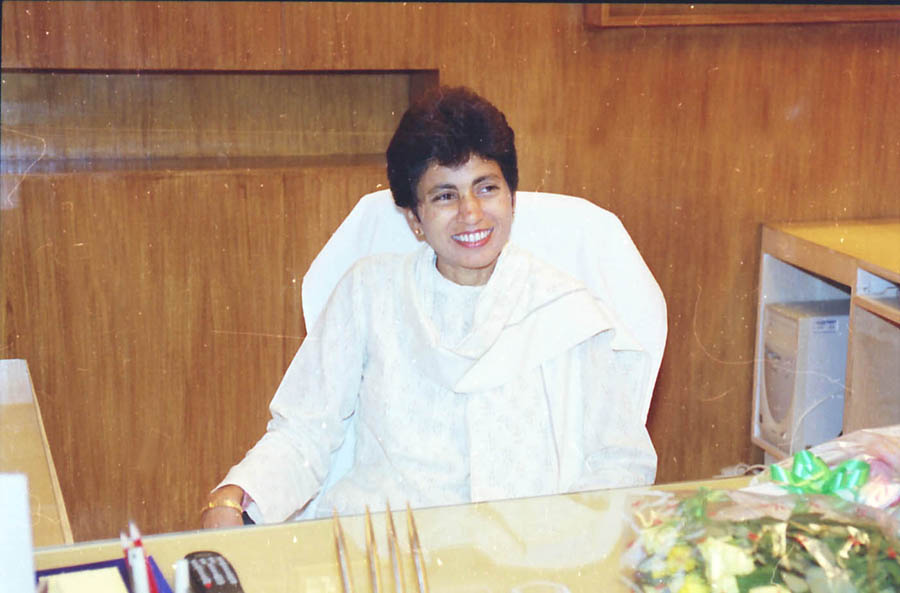
Selja in her office after taking over the charge as the Union Minister of Urban Employment & Poverty Alleviation in May 2004.

Selja also took the oath as the Union Minister of State (Independent Charge) for Housing and Urban Poverty Alleviation in the Manmohan Singh-led government that following the 2004 electoral victory.

Following her election to the 15th Lok Sabha from Ambala, Selja was appointed the Minister of Tourism in Manmohan Singh's second cabinet. She visited such countries as Italy and Cyprus aimed at improving international relations during her time in office.

In March 2011, Selja was issued notices by the Punjab and Haryana High Court over a petition that has accused her of "forgery, criminal intimidation, fabrication and hatching a criminal conspiracy". The petitioner, advocate B S Chahar, has alleged that Selja, who was "instrumental in instigating leaders and members of the Balmiki community against Jat leaders in Mirchpur case", tried to save herself from a litigation by pressurising the undertrials and forcing them to sign "blank and non judicial papers".

Selja later took oath as Minister of Social Justice and Empowerment in 2012. She remained in office for five years until the completion of her term in May 2014, a period during which she worked on issues relating to empowerment of women and rights of marginalised communities.

=== Move to Rajya Sabha and beyond (2014–present) ===
Selja was elected to the Rajya Sabha, the upper house of the Parliament of India, from her home state of Haryana in 2014. She unsuccessfully contested the 2019 Indian general elections from Ambala, losing out to Bhartiya Janata Party's Rattan Lal Kataria. Following that, she expressed a renewed interest in the politics of the state and was appointed the president of the Haryana Pradesh Congress Committee in September 2019, just ahead of the assembly elections scheduled for October.

In the 2024 General Elections, Kumari Selja has been nominated by Indian National Congress to contest Lok Sabha election from Sirsa - SC parliamentary constituency.

== Positions held ==
Positions Held
Period	Position
14 Aug. 2024 onwards	Member of the Committee on Estimates
June 2024	Elected to 18th Lok Sabha
01-Dec-2022 - 2023	General Secretary, AICC. Incharge
06-Oct-2022 onwards	Member, Congress Steering Committee
01-Jun-2022 onwards	Member, Congress Working Committee
12-Sep-2019 - 2022	President, Haryana Pradesh Congress Committee
10-Sep-2014 - 2020	Standing Committee on Transport, Tourism and Culture
10-Apr-2014 - 2020	Elected Member
31 Jan. 2014	Ceased to be a member of the Lok Sabha upon election as Member of Rajya Sabha
28-Oct-2012 - 28-Jan-2014	Union Cabinet Minister, Social Justice and Empowerment
31-May-2009 - 18-Jan-2011	Ministry of Housing and Urban Poverty Alleviation and Ministry of Tourism
2009	Re-elected to 15th Lok Sabha (4th term)
2007-2009	Elected President of 21st Governing Council of UN Habitat for a two year term
2005	Elected Member of the Governing Board of Commonwealth Local Government Forum
June 2006	Union Minister of State (Independent Charge), Ministry of Housing and Urban Poverty Alleviation
2004	Re-elected to 14th Lok Sabha (3rd term)
1996-2004	Secretary and spokesperson, All India Congress Committee
1996	Re-elected to 11th Lok Sabha (2nd term)
Sept. 1995-May 1996	Union Minister of State, Department of Education and Culture, Ministry of Human Resource Development
July 1992-Sept. 1995	Union Deputy Minister, Dept. of Education & Culture, Ministry of Human Resource Development
1991	Elected to 10th Lok Sabha
1990	Joint Secretary, All India Mahila Congress

== See also ==
- Chamar
- Jatav

Lok Sabha
Preceded by Het Ram	Member of Parliament for Sirsa; 1991 – 1998	Succeeded by Sushil Kumar Indora
Preceded by Rattan Lal Kataria	Member of Parliament for Ambala; 2004 – 2014	Succeeded by Rattan Lal Kataria
Rajya Sabha
Preceded by Ram Prakash	Member of Parliament for Rajya Sabha Haryana; 2014 - present	Incumbent
Political offices
Preceded by Meira Kumar	Union Minister of Housing and Urban Poverty Alleviation; 22 May 2009 – 26 May 2014	Succeeded by Thawar Chand Gehlot
Preceded by Ambika Soni	Union Minister of Tourism; 28 May 2009 – 19 January 2011	Succeeded by Subodh Kant Sahay
