= Tohana Assembly constituency =

Legislative Assembly constituency in Haryana State, India

Coordinates: 29.72°N 75.9°E

Tohana
- Constituency No. 39 for the Haryana Legislative Assembly

Constituency details
- Country: India
- Region: North India
- State: Haryana
- District: Fatehabad
- Lok Sabha constituency: Sirsa
- Established: 1999
- Total electors: 2,31,156
- Reservation: None

Member of Legislative Assembly
- 15th Haryana Legislative Assembly
- Incumbent Paramvir Singh
- Party: Indian National Congress
- Elected year: 2024

Tohana Assembly constituency is one of the 90 Legislative Assembly constituencies of Haryana state in India.

It is part of Fatehabad district.

== Members of the Legislative Assembly ==
Year	Member	Party
1967	Harpal Singh	Indian National Congress
1968	Harpal Singh	Vishal Haryana Party
1972	Harpal Singh	Indian National Congress
1977	Karam Singh Mehria	Janata Party
1982	Harpal Singh	Indian National Congress
1987	Harpal Singh	Communist Party of India (Marxist)
1991	Harpal Singh	Indian National Congress
1996	Vinod Kumar Marya	Samata Party
2000	Nishan Singh	Indian National Lok Dal
2005	Paramvir Singh	Indian National Congress
2009	Paramvir Singh	Indian National Congress
2014	Subhash Barala	Bharatiya Janata Party
2019	Devender Singh Babli	Jannayak Janta Party
2024	Paramvir Singh	Indian National Congress

== Election results ==
=== Assembly Election 2024 ===
2024 Haryana Legislative Assembly election: Tohana
Party	Candidate	Votes	%	±%
INC	Paramvir Singh	88,522	49.05%	▲39.64
BJP	Devender Singh Babli	77,686	43.05%	▲15.77
INLD	Kunal Karan Singh	9,773	5.42%	▲4.73
AAP	Sukhvinder Singh S/O Avtar Singh	1,616	0.90%	▼0.15
NOTA	None of the Above	698	0.39%	New
Margin of victory		10,836	6.00%	▼23.44
Turnout		1,80,467	77.83%	▼2.72
Registered electors		2,31,156		▲5.15
INC gain from JJP		Swing	▼7.67	

=== Assembly Election 2019 ===
2019 Haryana Legislative Assembly election : Tohana
Party	Candidate	Votes	%	±%
JJP	Devender Singh Babli	100,752	56.72%	
BJP	Subhash Barala	48,450	27.28%	▼1.29
INC	Paramvir Singh	16,717	9.41%	▼9.71
BSP	Baljit Bouddh	2,593	1.46%	▲0.62
AAP	Ajay Kumar	1,852	1.04%	
CPI(M)	Comrade Jagtar Singh	1,334	0.75%	
INLD	Rajpal Saini	1,213	0.68%	▼23.89
LSP	Bhim Singh	1,087	0.61%	
Margin of victory		52,302	29.45%	▲25.46
Turnout		1,77,622	80.55%	▼4.67
Registered electors		2,20,517		▲8.53
JJP gain from BJP		Swing	▲28.16	

=== Assembly Election 2014 ===
2014 Haryana Legislative Assembly election: Tohana
Party	Candidate	Votes	%	±%
BJP	Subhash Barala	49,462	28.57%	▲20.14
INLD	Nishan Singh	42,556	24.58%	▼6.62
Independent	Devender Singh Babli	38,282	22.11%	
INC	Paramvir Singh	33,111	19.12%	▼14.87
Independent	Sunita	1,506	0.87%	
BSP	Dharamender Gothwal	1,454	0.84%	▼7.19
HJC(BL)	Ramesh Dulat	1,008	0.58%	▼3.43
CPI	Chand Singh	869	0.50%	▼0.5
Margin of victory		6,906	3.99%	▲1.19
Turnout		1,73,155	85.22%	▲3.28
Registered electors		2,03,188		▲21.06
BJP gain from INC		Swing	▼5.43	

=== Assembly Election 2009 ===
2009 Haryana Legislative Assembly election: Tohana
Party	Candidate	Votes	%	±%
INC	Paramvir Singh	46,752	33.99%	▼11.43
INLD	Nishan Singh	42,900	31.19%	▲2.22
Independent	Roshan Lal	14,816	10.77%	
BJP	Subhash Barala	11,587	8.42%	▼8.53
BSP	Sanjay Sharma	11,038	8.03%	▲5.11
HJC(BL)	Dheera Ram	5,521	4.01%	
CPI	Sampuran Singh	1,374	1.00%	
Smast Bhartiya Party	Bajrang	1,280	0.93%	
Independent	Subhash Chand	881	0.64%	
Independent	Sita Ram	777	0.56%	
Margin of victory		3,852	2.80%	▼13.65
Turnout		1,37,535	81.94%	▲3.51
Registered electors		1,67,845		▲15.33
INC hold		Swing	▼11.43	

=== Assembly Election 2005 ===
2005 Haryana Legislative Assembly election: Tohana
Party	Candidate	Votes	%	±%
INC	Paramvir Singh	51,851	45.43%	▲6.37
INLD	Nishan Singh	33,068	28.97%	▼16.26
BJP	Subhash Chand	19,353	16.95%	
BSP	Singha Ram	3,331	2.92%	▼3.82
CPI(M)	Comrade Harpal Singh	3,120	2.73%	
NCP	Ram Bhagat	1,162	1.02%	
Independent	Subhash	1,107	0.97%	
Independent	Baljit Singh	641	0.56%	
Margin of victory		18,783	16.46%	▲10.28
Turnout		1,14,145	78.43%	▲3.47
Registered electors		1,45,532		▲14.56
INC gain from INLD		Swing	▲0.19	

=== Assembly Election 2000 ===
2000 Haryana Legislative Assembly election: Tohana
Party	Candidate	Votes	%	±%
INLD	Nishan Singh	43,076	45.23%	
INC	Harpal Singh S/O Nand Lal	37,196	39.06%	▲8.18
Independent	Gian Chand S/O Ludind Chand	7,439	7.81%	
BSP	Mangat Rai	6,413	6.73%	
Margin of victory		5,880	6.17%	▼4.66
Turnout		95,235	75.80%	▼2.95
Registered electors		1,27,040		▲3.33
INLD gain from SAP		Swing	▲3.52	

=== Assembly Election 1996 ===
1996 Haryana Legislative Assembly election: Tohana
Party	Candidate	Votes	%	±%
SAP	Vinod Kumar	39,957	41.71%	
INC	S. Harpal Singh	29,575	30.88%	▲0.65
HVP	S. Raghvir Singh	16,392	17.11%	
CPI(M)	Com. Harpal Singh	2,339	2.44%	▼13.78
Independent	Jaswant Ram	1,587	1.66%	
Independent	Ved Parkash	1,444	1.51%	
Independent	Radha Krishan	1,397	1.46%	
Independent	Bachna Ram	612	0.64%	
Independent	Dalip Singh	553	0.58%	
Margin of victory		10,382	10.84%	▲7.05
Turnout		95,788	80.58%	▲10.33
Registered electors		1,22,945		▲12.72
SAP gain from INC		Swing	▲11.49	

=== Assembly Election 1991 ===
1991 Haryana Legislative Assembly election: Tohana
Party	Candidate	Votes	%	±%
INC	Harpal Singh	22,279	30.23%	▲3.67
Independent	Vinod Kumar	19,488	26.44%	
CPI(M)	Harpal Singh	11,960	16.23%	▼26.57
JP	Sadhuram	8,480	11.51%	
Independent	Balam Singh	3,719	5.05%	
BJP	Krishan Lal	2,134	2.90%	
BSP	Banwari Ram	1,427	1.94%	
Independent	Ramesh Kumar	1,100	1.49%	
Independent	Balbir Singh	537	0.73%	
Independent	Inder Kumar	476	0.65%	
Independent	Jagjiwan Ram	428	0.58%	
Margin of victory		2,791	3.79%	▼12.46
Turnout		73,707	70.64%	▼4.65
Registered electors		1,09,070		▲11.42
INC gain from CPI(M)		Swing	▼12.57	

=== Assembly Election 1987 ===
1987 Haryana Legislative Assembly election: Tohana
Party	Candidate	Votes	%	±%
CPI(M)	Harpal Singh	30,261	42.80%	
INC	Paramvir Singh	18,774	26.55%	
Independent	Bhim Singh	16,438	23.25%	
Independent	Arjun Dev	1,893	2.68%	
Independent	Ranjha Ram	1,271	1.80%	
Independent	Jyoti Ram	431	0.61%	
Independent	Banarsi Dass	374	0.53%	
Independent	Manga Ram	323	0.46%	
Margin of victory		11,487	16.25%	
Turnout		70,705	73.41%	
Registered electors		97,891		
CPI(M) gain from INC		Swing		

=== Assembly By-election 1985 ===
1985 Haryana Legislative Assembly by-election: Tohana
Party	Candidate	Votes	%	±%
	Ch Hanuman Bishnoi	41,120		
LKD	S. L. Sardana	15,671		
CPI(M)	Harpal Singh	7,549		
CPI	D.Raj	1,757		
Independent	Wakil	871		
Independent	N. D. D. Adampuria	215		
Independent	K. Lal	112		
Margin of victory		25,449		
INC hold		Swing		

=== Assembly Election 1982 ===
1982 Haryana Legislative Assembly election: Tohana
Party	Candidate	Votes	%	±%
INC	Harpal Singh	31,184	52.93%	▲19.35
Independent	Bakshi Ram	23,792	40.38%	
CPI	Sampuran Singh	1,466	2.49%	▼2.63
Independent	Fateh Singh	1,014	1.72%	
Independent	Ram Singh	501	0.85%	
Margin of victory		7,392	12.55%	▼13.33
Turnout		58,918	75.76%	▲14.68
Registered electors		79,451		▲18.50
INC gain from JP		Swing	▼6.53	

=== Assembly Election 1977 ===
1977 Haryana Legislative Assembly election: Tohana
Party	Candidate	Votes	%	±%
JP	Karam Singh	23,709	59.46%	
INC	Bhim Singh	13,390	33.58%	▼29.89
CPI	Ishar Singh	2,040	5.12%	▼17.07
Independent	Fateh Singh	737	1.85%	
Margin of victory		10,319	25.88%	▼15.41
Turnout		39,876	60.20%	▼8.09
Registered electors		67,048		▲3.03
JP gain from INC		Swing	▼4.02	

=== Assembly Election 1972 ===
1972 Haryana Legislative Assembly election: Tohana
Party	Candidate	Votes	%	±%
INC	Harpal Singh	27,907	63.47%	▲37.44
CPI	Sampuran Singh	9,756	22.19%	
Independent	Manphul Singh	5,302	12.06%	
Independent	Jagat Ram	1,002	2.28%	
Margin of victory		18,151	41.28%	▲20.65
Turnout		43,967	69.65%	▲13.76
Registered electors		65,074		▲11.75
INC gain from VHP		Swing	▲16.81	

=== Assembly Election 1968 ===
1968 Haryana Legislative Assembly election: Tohana
Party	Candidate	Votes	%	±%
VHP	Harpal Singh	14,621	46.66%	
INC	Mehar Chand	8,156	26.03%	▼35.7
Independent	Madan Lal	7,656	24.43%	
RPI	Ram Kumar	439	1.40%	▲0.42
Independent	Fateh Singh	250	0.80%	
Independent	Jagat Ram	211	0.67%	
Margin of victory		6,465	20.63%	▲10.81
Turnout		31,333	55.37%	▼12.03
Registered electors		58,232		▲3.66
VHP gain from INC		Swing	▼15.06	

=== Assembly Election 1967 ===
1967 Haryana Legislative Assembly election: Tohana
Party	Candidate	Votes	%	±%
INC	G. Rai	22,830	61.73%	
INC	Harpal Singh	19,196	51.90%	
SSP	S. Singh	13,534	36.59%	
Independent	M. Ram	9,660	26.12%	
Independent	B. Singh	8,422	22.77%	
Independent	M. Singh	2,602	7.04%	
Independent	Jagat Ram	1,653	4.47%	
ABJS	K. Ram	1,253	3.39%	
CPI	N. Dass	1,069	2.89%	
RPI	Manohar	362	0.98%	
Independent	K. Ram	234	0.63%	
Margin of victory		3,634	9.83%	
Turnout		36,985	70.08%	
Registered electors		56,174		
INC win (new seat)				

== See also ==
- List of constituencies of the Haryana Legislative Assembly
