= Balwan Singh Daulatpuria =

Indian politician

Balwan Singh Doulatpuria

Member of the Haryana Legislative Assembly
- Incumbent
- Assumed office 2024
- Preceded by: Dura Ram
- Constituency: Fatehabad
- In office 2014–2019
- Preceded by: Prahlad Singh Gillan Khera
- Succeeded by: Dura Ram
- Constituency: Fatehabad

Personal details
- Born: 3 March 1968 (age 58) Fatehabad, Haryana
- Party: Indian National Congress
- Other political affiliations: Bharatiya Janata Party; Indian National Lok Dal
- Spouse: Parmeshwary Devi
- Children: 3

Balwan Singh Daulatpuria is an Indian politician from Haryana. He is a member of the Haryana Legislative Assembly from the Indian National Congress, representing the Fatehabad Vidhan sabha constituency in Haryana.
