= Sunita Duggal =

Indian politician

Member of Parliament, Lok Sabha
- In office 23 May 2019 – 4 June 2024
- Preceded by: Charanjeet Singh Rori
- Succeeded by: Selja Kumari
- Constituency: Sirsa

Personal details
- Born: 29 April 1968 (age 57) Rohtak, Haryana, India
- Party: Bharatiya Janata Party
- Spouse(s): Rajesh Duggal, IPS
- Children: Navsheen and Neeva Duggal
- Occupation: Politician

Sunita Duggal (born 29 April 1968) is an Indian politician and a former Member of Parliament (Lok Sabha) from Sirsa parliamentary constituency in Haryana.

She served in the Income Tax Department for 22 years at various posts.

She took VRS from Indian Revenue Service as Assistant Commissioner of Income Tax in 2014, her husband is an Indian Police Service (IPS) officer of Haryana cadre. She contested Haryana Vidhan Sabha Elections 2014 from Ratia but lost them by just 453 votes, because of her good educational background as well as bureaucratic experience she was appointed as Chairperson of Haryana Scheduled Castes Finance and Development Corporation in the Government of Haryana.
