= Jarnail Singh (Haryana politician) =

Indian politician

Member of Haryana Legislative Assembly
- Incumbent
- Assumed office 8 October 2024
- Preceded by: Lakshman Napa
- Constituency: Ratia

Personal details
- Party: Indian National Congress
- Profession: Politician

Jarnail Singh is an Indian politician from Haryana. He is a Member of the Haryana Legislative Assembly since the 2024 election, representing Ratia Assembly constituency as a Member of the Indian National Congress.

== See also ==
- 2024 Haryana Legislative Assembly election
- Haryana Legislative Assembly
