= Ashok Tanwar =

Indian politician

Member of Parliament, Lok Sabha
- In office 2009–2014
- Preceded by: Atma Singh Gill
- Succeeded by: Charanjeet Singh Rori
- Constituency: Sirsa

President of Haryana Pradesh Congress Committee
- In office 14 February 2014 – 4 September 2019
- Preceded by: Phool Chand Mullana
- Succeeded by: Selja Kumari

President of the Indian Youth Congress
- In office February 2005 – February 2010
- Preceded by: Randeep Surjewala
- Succeeded by: Rajeev Satav

President of the National Students Union of India
- In office 2003–2005
- Preceded by: Meenakshi Natarajan
- Succeeded by: Nadeem Javed

Personal details
- Born: 12 February 1976 (age 50) Haryana, India
- Party: Indian National Congress (till 2019, 2024–present)
- Other political affiliations: Bharatiya Janata Party (2024); Aam Aadmi Party (2022–2024); Trinamool Congress (2021–2022)
- Spouse: Avantika Maken (m. 2005)
- Children: 2
- Parent: Dilbag Singh
- Education: M.A.(History), M.Phil (History), Ph.D.
- Alma mater: Jawahar Lal Nehru University

Ashok Tanwar (born 12 February 1976) is an Indian politician who has served as the President of the Haryana Pradesh Congress Committee, Member of Parliament from Sirsa and Secretary, All India Congress Committee. He is a former President of Indian Youth Congress and NSUI. He was the youngest person to become the president of Indian Youth Congress. On 3 October 2024, he rejoined Indian National Congress in the presence of Leader of Opposition, Rahul Gandhi.

== Early life ==
He was born in a Chamar family in Chimni, Jhajjar district, Haryana to Dilbag Singh and Krishna Rathi. He did his BA from the Kakatiya University, Warangal. He went to Jawaharlal Nehru University's centre for Historical Studies and completed his M.A., M.Phil. and Ph.D. (Medieval Indian History).

== Political career ==
Tanwar started his career as an activist of the NSUI at JNU.

=== Youth politics ===
Tanwar rose to prominence when he contested the election for the president of student union of JNU. He became NSUI's secretary in 1999 and its president in 2003. Under his leadership, the NSUI won two elections in the Delhi University Students' Union (DUSU) since he took over in 2003 and improved its performance in the Left-dominated JNU.

During Ashok Tanwar's term as president, the Indian Youth Congress tried to strengthen its network at block, district and state level through workshops, seminars, street plays and social work related to the public issues.

=== Lok Sabha elections ===
In 2009 he won the Lok Sabha elections from Sirsa in Haryana as a Congress party's candidate with a margin of 354999 votes. However he lost the 2014 Lok Sabha elections as Congress Party's candidate to Charanjeet Singh Rori of Indian National Lok Dal.

=== President of Haryana Pradesh Congress Committee ===
He became the president of the Haryana Pradesh Congress Committee on 14 February 2014. He was succeeded by Selja Kumari as party president on 4 September 2019. He quit the Indian National Congress on 5 October 2019.

=== Bharatiya Janata Party ===
On 20 January 2024, Tanwar joined the Bharatiya Janata Party in the presence of former CM of Haryana Manohar Lal Khattar at the BJP headquarters in New Delhi. He unsuccessfully contested the 2024 Indian General Election from the Sirsa losing to Kumari Selja of Indian National Congress by a margin of more than 2.50 lakh votes.

=== Return to Congress ===
On 3 October 2024, on the last day of campaigning ahead of the Haryana Assembly election, Ashok Tanwar rejoined Congress

== Personal life ==
In June 2005, Ashok Tanwar married Avantika Maken, daughter of Lalit Maken and maternal granddaughter of former Indian President, Dr. Shankar Dayal Sharma. They have two children, one son and one daughter, Adikarta and Abhistada.

== Positions held ==
Positions Held
Period	Position
Jan 2005 - Feb 2010	President, Indian Youth Congress
2009 -2014	Elected to 15th Lok Sabha
23 Sep 2009	Member, Library Committee
2009	Member, Consultative Committee, Ministry of Environment and Forest
2009	Member, Joint Parliamentary Committee on office of Profit
25 Jan 2010	Convenor, Parliamentary Forum on Youth
18 May 2012	Member, Public Accounts Committee
29 Jun 2012	Member, PAC Sub-Committee - II (Railways)

== See also ==
- Ravidassia
- Chamar
