= Kalanwali =

- Town
- Location in Haryana, India Kalanwali (India)
- Coordinates: 29°51′N 74°57′E
- Country: India
- State: Haryana
- District: Sirsa

Population (2011)
  - Total: 22,095

Languages
  - Official: Hindi
  - Additional official: English and Punjabi
- Time zone: UTC+5:30 (IST)
- PIN: 125201
- Telephone code: +911696
- Vehicle registration: HR-94
- Website: sirsa.gov.in

Kalanwali is a town with a municipal committee in Sirsa district in the Indian state of Haryana. Being very near the Punjab border, most of the people in this area have Haryanvi, Hindi and Punjabi as their mother tongue.

== Demographics ==
As of 2001 India census, Kalanwali had a population of 25,155. Males constitute 53% of the population and females 47%. Kalanwali has an average literacy rate of 64% higher than the national average of 59.5%: male literacy is 70%, and female literacy is 58%. In Kalanwali, 13% of the population is under 6 years of age.
