= Haryana Lokhit Party =

- Abbreviation: HLP
- Leader: Gopal Kanda
- Chairperson: Gopal Kanda
- Spokesperson: Gopal Kanda
- Founded: 2 May 2014 (12 years ago)
- Headquarters: Tara Baba Kutiya (Tarkeshwar Dham) Sirsa district, Haryana
- Colours: Green
- ECI status: State party
- Alliance: NDA (2019 – 2024) INLD+ (2024)
- Seats in Haryana Legislative Assembly: 0 / 90

Haryana Lokhit Party (abbreviated as HLP) is an Indian political party in the state of Haryana. The party was founded by leader Gopal Kanda on 2 May 2014.
