= 1972 Haryana Legislative Assembly election =

Legislative assembly election in Haryana, India

- 11 March 1972

All 81 seats in the Haryana Legislative Assembly 42 seats needed for a majority
- Turnout: 70.46% (▲13.2%)
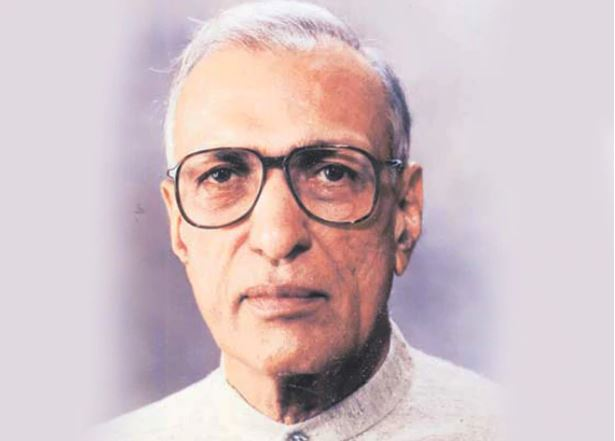
	Majority party	Minority party
		INC (O)
Leader	Bansi Lal
Party	INC(R)	INC(O)
Last election	48 seats	New Party
Seats won	52	12
Seat change	▲4	New Party
Popular vote	1639405	377427
Percentage	46.91%	10.80%
Swing	▲3.08%	New Party
Chief Minister before election
Bansi Lal
INC
Elected Chief Minister
Bansi Lal
INC

Legislative Assembly elections were held in the Indian state of Haryana on 11 March 1972 to elect all 81 members of the Haryana Legislative Assembly.

== Results ==
Party	Votes	%	Seats
Indian National Congress	1,639,405	46.91	52
Indian National Congress (Organization)	377,427	10.80	12
Vishal Haryana Party	242,444	6.94	3
Bharatiya Jana Sangh	228,761	6.55	2
Akhil Bhartiya Arya Sabha	77,234	2.21	1
Communist Party of India	69,335	1.98	0
Communist Party of India (Marxist)	12,617	0.36	0
Socialist Party	8,333	0.24	0
Republican Party of India	7,467	0.21	0
Republican Party of India (Khobragade)	3,636	0.10	0
Socialist Unity Center of India	2,640	0.08	0
Bharatiya Kranti Dal	1,486	0.04	0
Akhil Bharat Hindu Mahasabha	400	0.01	0
Independents	823,611	23.57	11
Total	3,494,796	100.00	81
Valid votes	3,494,796	79.12	
Invalid/blank votes	922,520	20.88	
Total votes	4,417,316	100.00	
Registered voters/turnout	5,091,082	86.77	
Source: ECI

== Elected members ==
Winner, runner-up, voter turnout, and victory margin in every constituency
Assembly Constituency		Turnout	Winner				Runner Up				Margin
#k	Names	%	Candidate	Party	Votes	%	Candidate	Party	Votes	%	Margin
1	Kalka	73.12%	Kishori Lal	INC	22,173	49.95%	Lachhman Singh	Independent	20,565	46.33%	1,608
2	Naraingarh	68.72%	Jagjit Singh	INC	21,818	51.23%	Sadhu Ram	Independent	14,556	34.18%	7,262
3	Chhachhrauli	61.11%	Parbhu Ram	INC	19,793	50.45%	Des Raj	CPI	16,313	41.58%	3,480
4	Jagadhri	75.52%	Om Prakash Sharma	Independent	16,618	40.75%	Sadhu Ram	INC	12,439	30.50%	4,179
5	Yamunanagar	70.47%	Garish Chander	INC	18,565	39.68%	Malik Chand	ABJS	16,147	34.51%	2,418
6	Mulana	63.18%	Phool Chand	INC	24,140	64.93%	Suraj Bhan	ABJS	13,041	35.07%	11,099
7	Naggal	72.11%	Harmohinder Singh Chatha	INC	23,125	59.95%	Mohinder Singh	Independent	13,015	33.74%	10,110
8	Ambala Cantt.	71.00%	Hans Raj Suri	INC	15,687	56.57%	Bhagwan Dass	ABJS	11,175	40.30%	4,512
9	Ambala City	69.39%	Lekh Wati Jain	INC	16,932	50.67%	Laxmi Narain	ABJS	16,170	48.39%	762
10	Shahbad	76.48%	Amir Chand	INC	14,735	38.42%	Harnam Singh	CPI	14,224	37.09%	511
11	Thanesar	75.91%	Om Parkash	INC	20,657	47.96%	Ram Saran Das	ABJS	18,454	42.85%	2,203
12	Babain	66.42%	Chand Ram	Independent	15,728	42.55%	Ulsi Ram	INC	15,584	42.16%	144
13	Nilokheri	77.09%	Shib Ram	ABJS	10,764	27.97%	Chanda Singh	INC	10,428	27.09%	336
14	Indri	77.63%	Parsani Devi	INC	22,174	47.37%	Des Raj	INC(O)	20,982	44.82%	1,192
15	Karnal	70.36%	Ram Lal	ABJS	17,719	44.34%	Shanti Devi	INC	16,857	42.18%	862
16	Jundla	61.08%	Ram Kishan	INC	14,665	43.37%	Banwari Ram	Independent	13,927	41.18%	738
17	Gharaunda	69.56%	Rulya Ram	INC(O)	16,746	36.87%	Zila Singh	INC	13,537	29.80%	3,209
18	Samalkha	68.67%	Hari Singh	INC	20,346	46.80%	Jai Singh	INC(O)	14,151	32.55%	6,195
19	Panipat	76.72%	Hakumat Rai	INC	27,513	58.38%	Fateh Chand	ABJS	17,523	37.18%	9,990
20	Naultha	73.73%	Mansa Ram	INC	20,760	52.21%	Amar Singh	Independent	17,042	42.86%	3,718
21	Rajound	65.22%	Jogi Ram	INC(O)	23,185	53.28%	Ran Singh	INC	12,080	27.76%	11,105
22	Pundri	74.83%	Ishwar Singh	INC	24,074	54.54%	Marcharan Singh	INC(O)	16,158	36.61%	7,916
23	Serhada	77.98%	Surjit Singh	INC	18,169	39.67%	Jagjit Singh Pohlu	Independent	16,293	35.57%	1,876
24	Kaithal	80.25%	Charan Dass	Independent	26,095	48.87%	Om Parbha	INC	22,673	42.46%	3,422
25	Pehowa	76.18%	Piara Singh	INC	21,224	43.38%	Khushvant Singh	Independent	15,391	31.45%	5,833
26	Kalayat	66.57%	Bhagat Ram S/O Hansa	INC(O)	17,032	44.22%	Bhagat Ram S/O Jamni	INC	15,812	41.06%	1,220
27	Narwana	79.92%	Gauri Shankar	INC(O)	17,482	36.16%	Tek Chand	Akhil Bhartiya Arya Sabha	15,733	32.54%	1,749
28	Jind	72.82%	Dal Singh	INC(O)	28,281	54.29%	Daya Krishan	INC	21,999	42.23%	6,282
29	Julana	76.76%	Fateh Singh	INC	30,033	65.54%	Ram Singh	INC(O)	15,788	34.46%	14,245
30	Safidon	75.03%	Dhajja Ram	INC	19,570	45.86%	Sat Narain	VHP	19,462	45.60%	108
31	Meham	72.07%	Umed	Independent	19,654	44.94%	Raj Singh	INC	19,042	43.54%	612
32	Baroda	68.78%	Shyam Chand	INC	24,081	57.65%	Ram Dhari	INC(O)	15,123	36.20%	8,958
33	Gohana	76.27%	Ram Dhari Gaur	INC	18,206	41.01%	Har Kishan	Independent	13,505	30.42%	4,701
34	Kailana	76.15%	Partap Singh Tyagi	Independent	22,353	49.99%	Rajinder Singh	INC	21,283	47.60%	1,070
35	Sonipat	69.86%	Chiaranji Lal	INC	25,183	56.74%	Vas Dev	ABJS	17,063	38.44%	8,120
36	Rai	74.99%	Rizaq Ram	INC(O)	19,631	47.30%	Jaswant Singh	INC	18,702	45.06%	929
37	Rohat	65.81%	Phool Chand	INC(O)	12,249	35.07%	Kanwar Singh	Independent	11,726	33.58%	523
38	Hassangarh	66.55%	Maru Singh	INC	12,185	33.09%	Raghbir Singh	Independent	10,069	27.34%	2,116
39	Kiloi	76.93%	Shreyo Nath	INC(O)	23,474	54.37%	Partap Singh	INC	19,704	45.63%	3,770
40	Rohtak	73.60%	Kishan Das	INC	24,879	52.86%	Mangal Sein	ABJS	21,057	44.74%	3,822
41	Kalanaur	68.41%	Satram Dass	INC	16,546	45.95%	Nasib Singh	ABJS	15,531	43.14%	1,015
42	Beri	61.32%	Partap Singh Doulta	Independent	20,782	50.36%	Nawa Singh	INC	17,112	41.46%	3,670
43	Salhawas	63.86%	Phul Singh	INC	22,455	50.03%	Shakuntla Devi	VHP	16,889	37.63%	5,566
44	Jhajjar	67.70%	Manphul Singh	INC(O)	24,060	50.28%	Sure Der Singh	INC	23,795	49.72%	265
45	Bahadurgarh	67.42%	Hardwari Lal	INC(O)	23,495	47.72%	Mehar Singh	INC	23,100	46.92%	395
46	Faridabad	59.94%	Kanwal Nath Gulati	Independent	26,498	46.09%	Kamadev Kapil	INC	19,895	34.60%	6,603
47	Ballabgarh	72.47%	Sharua Rani	INC	25,391	48.14%	Raji Der Singh	Independent	24,208	45.90%	1,183
48	Palwal	71.11%	Sham Lal	Akhil Bhartiya Arya Sabha	24,253	49.79%	Kalyan Singh	INC	19,919	40.89%	4,334
49	Hassanpur	56.69%	Bihari Lal	INC	16,716	46.56%	Gaya Lal	Akhil Bhartiya Arya Sabha	14,039	39.11%	2,677
50	Ferozepur Jhirka	68.91%	Abdul Razak	Independent	14,489	35.48%	Din Mohhamad	INC	10,631	26.03%	3,858
51	Nuh	75.67%	Chaudhary Rahim Khan	Independent	23,536	50.13%	Chaudhary Khurshid Ahmed	INC	21,697	46.21%	1,839
52	Hathin	69.18%	Ramji Lal	Independent	17,173	39.58%	Hem Raj	INC	12,697	29.26%	4,476
53	Sohna	70.43%	Kanhaya Lal	INC	27,162	55.79%	Pratap Singh Thakran	VHP	19,386	39.82%	7,776
54	Gurgaon	65.23%	Mahabir Singh	INC	23,507	52.98%	Ram Chander Gulati	ABJS	17,873	40.28%	5,634
55	Pataudi	77.74%	Sisram	INC	29,273	55.91%	Ramjiwan Singh	VHP	20,313	38.79%	8,960
56	Rewari	70.73%	Abhai Singh	INC	17,389	45.79%	Shoe Raj Singh	VHP	16,696	43.97%	693
57	Bawal	66.72%	Ram Prashan	INC	23,259	59.66%	Kanhia Lal	VHP	15,727	40.34%	7,532
58	Jatusana	67.76%	Maha Singh	INC	25,028	54.97%	Sumitra Devi	VHP	19,847	43.59%	5,181
59	Ateli	63.06%	Banshi Singh	VHP	17,214	42.64%	Nari Der Singh	INC	12,578	31.16%	4,636
60	Narnaul	67.74%	Ram Saran Chand Mittal	INC	21,455	55.61%	Manoher Lal	VHP	17,126	44.39%	4,329
61	Mahendragarh	71.18%	Nehal Singh	INC	27,622	64.51%	Hari Singh	VHP	14,440	33.72%	13,182
62	Kanina	63.40%	Dalip Singh	VHP	20,261	54.18%	Onkar Singh	INC	17,134	45.82%	3,127
63	Badhra	66.00%	Lajja Rani	INC	21,591	47.48%	Attar Singh	INC(O)	15,313	33.68%	6,278
64	Dadri	58.50%	Ganpat Rai	INC(O)	17,922	48.10%	Harnam Singh	INC	15,303	41.07%	2,619
65	Loharu	68.01%	Chandrawati	INC	20,565	50.13%	Hira Nand	Independent	13,213	32.21%	7,352
66	Tosham	75.09%	Bansi Lal	INC	30,934	71.17%	Devi Lal	Independent	10,440	24.02%	20,494
67	Bhiwani	73.29%	Banarsi Das Gupta	INC	16,144	36.93%	Sagar Ram Gupta	Independent	13,650	31.22%	2,494
68	Mundhal Khurd	77.45%	Swaroop Singh	INC	14,610	35.14%	Jaswant Singh	VHP	12,172	29.28%	2,438
69	Narnaund	74.04%	Joginder Singh	INC	20,484	47.89%	Virender Singh	Akhil Bhartiya Arya Sabha	17,543	41.01%	2,941
70	Hansi	71.96%	Ishar Singh	Independent	14,896	36.90%	Hari Singh	INC	11,143	27.61%	3,753
71	Bawani Khera	70.75%	Amar Singh	VHP	23,180	60.22%	Parbhu Singh	INC	15,314	39.78%	7,866
72	Adampur	79.18%	Bhajan Lal	INC	28,928	60.54%	Devi Lal	Independent	17,967	37.60%	10,961
73	Hisar	69.62%	Gulab Singh Dhiman	INC	22,533	48.40%	Balwant Rai Tayal	INC(O)	20,869	44.83%	1,664
74	Barwala	70.74%	Pir Chand	INC(O)	20,659	46.72%	Neki Ram	INC	19,219	43.47%	1,440
75	Tohana	69.65%	Harpal Singh	INC	27,907	63.47%	Sampuran Singh	CPI	9,756	22.19%	18,151
76	Fatehabad	76.76%	Pokhar Ram	INC	30,925	55.88%	Gobind Rai	Independent	23,366	42.22%	7,559
77	Badopal	70.96%	Mehar Chand	INC	23,490	55.56%	Pirthi	Independent	12,245	28.96%	11,245
78	Sirsa	73.67%	Premsukh Dass	INC	22,205	50.16%	Lachhman Dass Arora	Independent	19,889	44.93%	2,316
79	Rori	73.49%	Harkishan Lal	INC	26,581	51.82%	Sahib Singh	Independent	11,774	22.95%	14,807
80	Dabwali	55.17%	Govardhan Dass Chauhan	INC	27,086	79.58%	Gurdial Singh	Independent	3,209	9.43%	23,877
81	Ellenabad	74.89%	Brij Lal	INC	27,266	55.76%	Birbal	Independent	15,160	31.01%	12,106

== See also ==
- 1972 elections in India
- Elections in Haryana
