= 1968 Haryana Legislative Assembly election =

1968 assembly elections in Haryana

- 12 May 1968

All 81 seats in the Haryana Legislative Assembly 41 seats needed for a majority
- Registered: 4,552,539
- Turnout: 57.26%
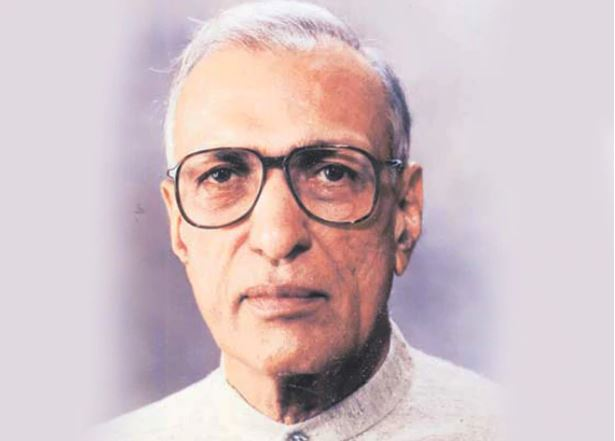

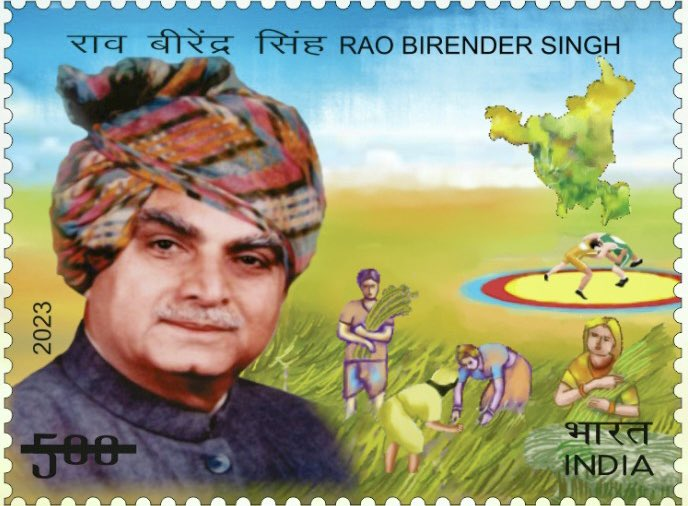

	Majority party	Minority party	Third party
Leader	Bansi Lal
Party	INC	VHP	ABJS
Seats before	48	New	12
Seats won	48	16	7
Popular vote	43.83%	14.86%	10.45%
	Fourth party	Fifth party	Sixth party
	SWA	BKD	RPI
Party	SWA	BKD	RPI
Seats before	3	New	2
Seats won	2	1	1
Popular vote	8.18%	1.90%	1.60%
Chief Minister before election
Rao Birender Singh
INC
Elected Chief Minister
Bansi Lal
INC

Elections to the Haryana Legislative Assembly were held on 12 May 1968 to elect members of all 81 Vadha Sabha constituencies in Haryana, India. The Indian National Congress won a majority of seats and Bansi Lal was appointed as the Chief Minister of Haryana.

== Results ==
Party	Votes	%	Seats
Indian National Congress	1,114,176	43.83	48
Vishal Haryana Party	377,744	14.86	16
Bharatiya Jana Sangh	265,739	10.45	7
Swatantra Party	207,843	8.18	2
Bharatiya Kranti Dal	48,298	1.90	1
Republican Party of India	40,597	1.60	1
Sanyukta Socialist Party	23,936	0.94	0
Akali Dal - Sant Fateh Singh	15,055	0.59	0
Communist Party of India	8,210	0.32	0
Communist Party of India (Marxist)	3,632	0.14	0
Praja Socialist Party	1,801	0.07	0
Independents	434,907	17.11	6
Total	2,541,938	100.00	81
Valid votes	2,541,938	97.52	
Invalid/blank votes	64,729	2.48	
Total votes	2,606,667	100.00	
Registered voters/turnout	4,552,539	57.26	
Source: ECI

== Elected members ==
Winner, runner-up, voter turnout, and victory margin in every constituency
Assembly Constituency		Turnout	Winner				Runner Up				Margin
#k	Names	%	Candidate	Party	Votes	%	Candidate	Party	Votes	%	Margin
1	Kalka	68.53%	Kishori Lal	INC	22,880	58.34%	Lachhman Singh	Independent	13,552	34.55%	9,328
2	Naraingarh	40.86%	Lal Singh	INC	14,745	65.46%	Jagat Narain	BKD	3,585	15.92%	11,160
3	Chhachhrauli	41.63%	Parbhu Ram	INC	13,696	59.45%	Phool Chand	VHP	9,340	40.55%	4,356
4	Jagadhri	58.38%	Rameshwar Dass	INC	13,534	46.23%	Brij Mohan	ABJS	9,432	32.22%	4,102
5	Yamunanagar	52.51%	Malik Chand	ABJS	10,243	29.28%	Bhupinder Singh	Independent	7,765	22.20%	2,478
6	Mulana	52.51%	Ram Parkash	INC	16,830	60.98%	Ram Parshad	RPI	10,179	36.88%	6,651
7	Naggal	54.42%	Abdul Gaffar Khan	INC	8,654	37.83%	Mohinder Singh	Independent	6,283	27.46%	2,371
8	Ambala Cantt.	62.07%	Bhagwan Dass	ABJS	13,009	51.62%	Dev Raj Anand	INC	11,606	46.05%	1,403
9	Ambala City	55.00%	Lekh Wati Jain	INC	14,552	55.58%	Faqir Chand Aggarwal	ABJS	9,482	36.22%	5,070
10	Shahbad	58.88%	Jagdish Chander	INC	10,215	38.50%	Jagjit Singh	VHP	8,583	32.35%	1,632
11	Thanesar	60.42%	Om Parkash	INC	14,473	48.05%	Ram Saran Das	ABJS	14,089	46.78%	384
12	Babain	51.53%	Chand Ram	Independent	13,535	51.09%	Teka	INC	9,242	34.89%	4,293
13	Nilokheri	67.37%	Chanda Singh	Independent	15,155	49.94%	Ram Sarup Giri	INC	8,617	28.40%	6,538
14	Indri	59.32%	Parsani Devi	INC	10,846	35.16%	Des Raj	Independent	8,060	26.13%	2,786
15	Karnal	63.01%	Shanti Prasad	Independent	10,648	33.05%	Ram Lal	ABJS	8,285	25.71%	2,363
16	Jundla	51.94%	Banwari Ram	RPI	14,253	54.74%	Ram Kishan	INC	10,642	40.87%	3,611
17	Gharaunda	58.31%	Randhir Singh	ABJS	7,766	23.80%	Rulya Ram	SWA	7,754	23.76%	12
18	Samalkha	52.18%	Kartar Singh	INC	17,486	58.75%	Dhram Vir	ABJS	9,046	30.39%	8,440
19	Panipat	64.39%	Fateh Chand	ABJS	16,957	45.97%	Chaman Lal	INC	13,386	36.29%	3,571
20	Naultha	60.96%	Jai Singh	INC	16,130	53.97%	Inder Singh	VHP	13,264	44.38%	2,866
21	Rajound	36.82%	Ran Singh	INC	11,588	52.06%	Jogi Ram	VHP	6,534	29.35%	5,054
22	Pundri	58.84%	Ishwar Singh	Independent	14,211	45.43%	Tara Singh	INC	13,773	44.03%	438
23	Serhada	67.70%	Surjit Singh	INC	21,074	57.15%	Jagjit Singh Pohlu	SWA	11,929	32.35%	9,145
24	Kaithal	72.38%	Om Prabha	INC	21,273	50.41%	Gian Chand	ABJS	18,950	44.90%	2,323
25	Pehowa	52.39%	Piara Singh	INC	11,798	38.68%	Ram Dia	ABJS	7,627	25.01%	4,171
26	Kalayat	28.45%	Bhagtu	INC	9,117	61.27%	Anant Ram	SWA	4,998	33.59%	4,119
27	Narwana	64.31%	Neki Ram	INC	17,833	50.92%	Shamsher Singh	SWA	11,685	33.36%	6,148
28	Jind	55.71%	Daya Krishan	INC	17,733	51.77%	Shanker Dass	Independent	16,136	47.11%	1,597
29	Julana	65.95%	Narain Singh	SWA	17,052	49.90%	Dal Singh	INC	16,008	46.85%	1,044
30	Safidon	59.69%	Satya Narain	VHP	14,895	49.63%	Ram Kishan	INC	12,655	42.17%	2,240
31	Meham	65.38%	Raj Singh	INC	16,479	48.95%	Maha Singh	Independent	16,253	48.28%	226
32	Baroda	50.28%	Shyam Chand	VHP	9,934	35.83%	Ram Dhari	INC	8,092	29.19%	1,842
33	Gohana	68.23%	Ram Dhari	INC	15,970	43.56%	Har Kishan	Independent	15,202	41.47%	768
34	Kailana	62.69%	Rajinder Singh	VHP	17,026	49.88%	Partap Singh Tyagi	INC	15,078	44.17%	1,948
35	Sonipat	58.45%	Mukhtiar Singh	ABJS	18,480	56.15%	Dewan Dwarka Khosla	INC	13,174	40.03%	5,306
36	Rai	50.81%	Jaswant Singh	INC	16,306	60.59%	Dalpat Singh	Independent	6,262	23.27%	10,044
37	Rohat	42.59%	Kanwar Singh	INC	11,268	53.88%	Phool Chand	Independent	9,646	46.12%	1,622
38	Hassangarh	52.67%	Maru Singh	INC	14,372	52.66%	Raghbir Singh	Independent	5,244	19.22%	9,128
39	Kiloi	70.60%	Ranbir Singh Hooda	INC	18,751	51.93%	Shreyo Nath	Independent	17,025	47.15%	1,726
40	Rohtak	60.29%	Mangal Sein	ABJS	17,534	48.15%	Dev Raj	INC	17,468	47.97%	66
41	Kalanaur	60.98%	Satram Dass	ABJS	12,446	42.26%	Badlu Ram	INC	9,487	32.22%	2,959
42	Beri	61.62%	Ran Singh	INC	24,801	67.57%	Partap Singh Doulta	Independent	7,060	19.23%	17,741
43	Salhawas	44.88%	Shakuntla	VHP	13,455	47.16%	Phul Singh	INC	11,885	41.65%	1,570
44	Jhajjar	57.11%	Ganga Sagar	INC	13,253	35.46%	Manphul Singh	SWA	11,414	30.54%	1,839
45	Bahadurgarh	68.50%	Partap Singh	INC	23,714	53.82%	Hardwari Lal	SWA	19,279	43.76%	4,435
46	Faridabad	52.87%	Kamal Dev	INC	9,982	27.56%	Kanwal Nath Gulati	Independent	8,365	23.10%	1,617
47	Ballabgarh	54.18%	Sharda Rani	INC	14,989	44.10%	Nathu Singh	VHP	7,572	22.28%	7,417
48	Palwal	58.49%	Roop Lal Mehta	INC	19,231	53.87%	Dhan Singh	SWA	12,102	33.90%	7,129
49	Hassanpur	45.76%	Manohar Singh	INC	15,583	60.17%	Shyah Sunder	SWA	6,828	26.37%	8,755
50	Ferozepur Jhirka	47.25%	Abdul Razak	VHP	12,503	50.72%	Imam Khan	INC	12,148	49.28%	355
51	Nuh	50.72%	Chaudhary Khurshid Ahmed	INC	14,675	53.46%	Chaudhary Rahim Khan	VHP	8,738	31.83%	5,937
52	Hathin	46.13%	Hem Raj	Independent	7,381	28.99%	Debi Singh Tewatia	INC	7,311	28.72%	70
53	Sohna	69.50%	Kanhaya Lal	INC	21,733	52.54%	Tayyab Hussain	VHP	17,283	41.78%	4,450
54	Gurgaon	56.24%	Mahabir Singh	INC	19,114	58.12%	Partap Singh Thakran	ABJS	12,396	37.69%	6,718
55	Pataudi	69.53%	Ramjiwan Singh	VHP	20,306	47.23%	Sees Ram	SWA	14,678	34.14%	5,628
56	Rewari	63.05%	Sumitra Devi	VHP	15,010	49.19%	Babu Dayal	INC	11,727	38.43%	3,283
57	Bawal	53.28%	Jee Sukh	VHP	14,141	51.21%	Hira Lal	INC	9,295	33.66%	4,846
58	Jatusana	67.33%	Birender Singh	VHP	23,890	59.31%	Nihal Singh	INC	16,144	40.08%	7,746
59	Ateli	69.90%	Birender Singh	VHP	23,673	59.09%	Nihal Singh	INC	15,937	39.78%	7,736
60	Narnaul	52.42%	Ram Saran Chand Mittal	INC	12,661	48.71%	Dharam Paul	Independent	11,361	43.71%	1,300
61	Mahendragarh	53.19%	Hari Singh	VHP	11,246	40.26%	Narinder Singh	INC	6,623	23.71%	4,623
62	Kanina	58.28%	Dalip Singh	VHP	18,413	63.74%	Lal Singh	INC	9,700	33.58%	8,713
63	Badhra	57.23%	Amir Singh	VHP	11,460	33.90%	Attar Singh	Independent	8,748	25.88%	2,712
64	Dadri	40.23%	Ganpat Rai	INC	11,864	53.41%	Harnam Singh	SSP	6,908	31.10%	4,956
65	Loharu	54.34%	Chandrawati	INC	14,480	49.11%	Tulsi Ram	Independent	12,982	44.03%	1,498
66	Tosham	58.01%	Bansi Lal	INC	9,109	29.94%	Jangbir Singh	SSP	7,860	25.84%	1,249
67	Bhiwani	55.61%	Banarsi Das Gupta	INC	13,572	46.53%	Bhagwan Dev	ABJS	12,384	42.46%	1,188
68	Mundhal Khurd	60.92%	Swaroop Singh	INC	11,878	38.42%	Jaswant Singh	SWA	10,456	33.82%	1,422
69	Narnaund	51.93%	Joginder Singh	SWA	14,973	53.19%	Rameshwar Dutt	INC	8,235	29.26%	6,738
70	Hansi	56.14%	Hari Singh	INC	13,608	46.28%	Ajit Singh	VHP	9,363	31.84%	4,245
71	Bawani Khera	41.98%	Parbhu Singh	INC	9,611	44.16%	Amar Singh	SWA	7,397	33.99%	2,214
72	Adampur	71.63%	Bhajan Lal	INC	23,723	59.26%	Balraj Singh	Independent	13,679	34.17%	10,044
73	Hisar	60.13%	Balwant Rai Tayal	BKD	17,654	47.03%	Gulab Singh Dhiman	INC	16,495	43.94%	1,159
74	Barwala	39.99%	Gordhan Dass	INC	9,919	45.89%	Pir Chand	BKD	9,548	44.18%	371
75	Tohana	55.37%	Harpal Singh	VHP	14,621	46.66%	Mehar Chand	INC	8,156	26.03%	6,465
76	Fatehabad	65.52%	Pokhar Ram	INC	24,029	57.22%	Lila Krishan	Independent	17,963	42.78%	6,066
77	Badopal	62.28%	Partap Singh	VHP	18,791	52.72%	Raja Ram	INC	16,191	45.42%	2,600
78	Sirsa	62.49%	Premsukh Dass	INC	17,856	53.17%	Sushil Chander	Independent	12,001	35.74%	5,855
79	Rori	63.30%	Harkishan Lal	INC	15,662	38.76%	Dara Singh	Akali Dal (SFS)	15,055	37.26%	607
80	Dabwali	57.88%	Teja Singh	Independent	11,925	37.74%	Kesra Ram	INC	10,477	33.16%	1,448
81	Ellenabad	71.40%	Lal Chand	VHP	20,816	49.53%	Om Prakash	INC	15,485	36.85%	5,331

== See also ==
- List of constituencies of the Haryana Legislative Assembly
- 1968 elections in India
