= 1987 Haryana Legislative Assembly election =

Legislative assembly election in Haryana, India

- 17 June 1987

All 90 seats of the Haryana Legislative Assembly 46 seats needed for a majority
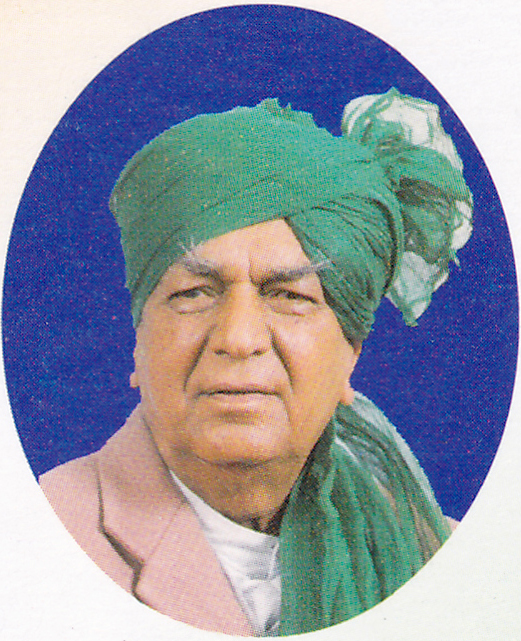

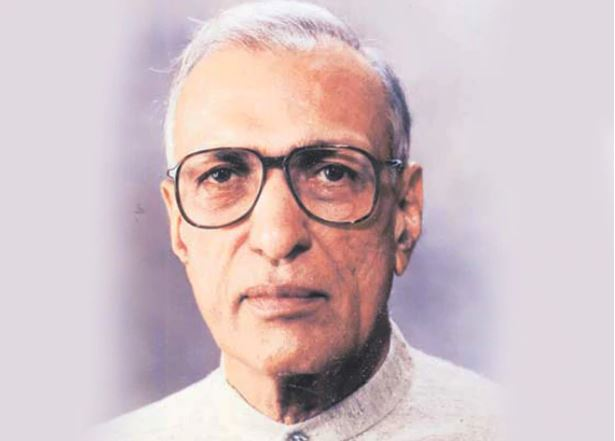
	First party	Second party	Third party
		BJP
Leader	Devi Lal	--	Bansi Lal
Party	LKD	BJP	INC
Last election	31	5	36
Seats won	60	16	5
Seat change	▲29	▲11	▼31
Percentage	38.58%	10.08%	29.18%
Chief Minister before election
Bansi Lal
INC
Elected Chief Minister
Devi Lal
LKD

The 1987 Haryana Legislative Assembly election was held in the Indian state of Haryana on the 17 June 1987 to elect all 90 members of the state's legislative assembly. Lokdal won 60 seat and its leader Devi Lal was sworn in as chief minister of Haryana on 20 June 1987.

== Results ==
Summary of results of the Haryana Legislative Assembly election, 1987
Party	Contested	Won	Votes	%
Lok Dal	69	60	2,349,397	38.58%
Bharatiya Janata Party	20	16	613,819	10.08%
Indian National Congress	90	5	1,776,820	29.18%
Communist Party of India (Marxist)	4	1	47,434	0.78%
Communist Party of India	5	1	32,738	0.54%
Independents	1045	7	1,128,803	18.54%
Total	1322	90	6,089,130	

=== Results by constituency ===
Winner, runner-up, voter turnout, and victory margin in every constituency
Assembly Constituency		Turnout	Winner				Runner Up				Margin
#k	Names	%	Candidate	Party	Votes	%	Candidate	Party	Votes	%	Margin
1	Kalka	68.53%	Kanti Parkash Bhalla	LKD	38,473	50.33%	Brij Bhushan	INC	31,001	40.55%	7,472
2	Naraingarh	77.63%	Jagpal Singh	IND	24,456	38.04%	Sadhu Ram	LKD	12,363	19.23%	12,093
3	Sadhaura	76.01%	Bhag Mal	IND	37,246	53.22%	Sher Singh	INC	21,238	30.35%	16,008
4	Chhachhrauli	80.02%	Mohhamad Aslm Khan	INC	22,732	34.46%	Ram Rattan Singh	IND	15,809	23.97%	6,923
5	Yamunanagar	68.04%	Kamla Verma	BJP	31,336	44.37%	Rajesh Kumar	INC	20,024	28.35%	11,312
6	Jagadhri	76.29%	Brij Mohan	BJP	31,236	46.94%	Om Parkash Sharma	INC	18,787	28.23%	12,449
7	Mulana	74.11%	Suraj Bhan	BJP	31,644	48.29%	Phul Chand	INC	25,202	38.46%	6,442
8	Ambala Cantt.	71.18%	Sushma Swaraj	BJP	22,473	48.59%	Ram Dass Dhamija	INC	14,501	31.35%	7,972
9	Ambala City	69.70%	Shiv Prasad	BJP	25,073	45.67%	Ram Yash	INC	19,632	35.76%	5,441
10	Naggal	80.79%	Harmindra Singh	IND	35,406	53.11%	Nirmal Singh	INC	24,171	36.26%	11,235
11	Indri	75.06%	Lachhman	LKD	38,114	55.23%	Des Raj	INC	18,771	27.20%	19,343
12	Nilokheri	75.19%	Jai Singh	IND	17,757	26.51%	Devi Singh	LKD	14,071	21.01%	3,686
13	Karnal	62.44%	Lachhman Dass	BJP	32,156	52.54%	Jai Prakash	INC	26,955	44.04%	5,201
14	Jundla	64.68%	Risal Singh	LKD	45,096	78.07%	Puran Singh	INC	9,942	17.21%	35,154
15	Gharaunda	70.54%	Piru Ram	LKD	23,424	36.38%	Ved Pal	INC	19,338	30.03%	4,086
16	Assandh	66.88%	Manphool Singh	LKD	39,730	66.45%	Sarwan Kumar	INC	15,934	26.65%	23,796
17	Panipat	72.12%	Balbir Paul	INC	32,476	42.00%	Kasturi Lal	IND	21,502	27.81%	10,974
18	Samalkha	75.23%	Sachdev	LKD	28,378	39.85%	Hari Singh	INC	23,633	33.19%	4,745
19	Naultha	74.53%	Satbir S/O Gaje Singh	LKD	41,808	62.75%	Parsani Devi	INC	12,528	18.80%	29,280
20	Shahbad	74.51%	Harnam Singh	CPI	23,831	36.66%	Khariti Lal	IND	12,130	18.66%	11,701
21	Radaur	73.88%	Rattan Lal Kataria	BJP	32,215	52.82%	Lehri Singh	IND	11,586	19.00%	20,629
22	Thanesar	69.30%	Gurdial Singh	LKD	35,585	55.16%	Sahab Singh	INC	12,961	20.09%	22,624
23	Pehowa	74.72%	Balbir Singh	LKD	43,756	61.41%	Tara Singh	INC	20,162	28.30%	23,594
24	Guhla	73.66%	Buta Singh	LKD	40,772	57.74%	Dilu Ram	INC	14,145	20.03%	26,627
25	Kaithal	75.71%	Surinder Kumar	LKD	26,326	42.27%	Charan Dass	IND	19,637	31.53%	6,689
26	Pundri	74.59%	Makhan Singh	LKD	33,647	52.59%	Ishwar Singh S/O Singhram	INC	21,250	33.21%	12,397
27	Pai	75.60%	Nar Singh	LKD	44,151	68.93%	Harphul Singh	INC	14,668	22.90%	29,483
28	Hassangarh	66.97%	Om Parkahs Bhardwaj	LKD	36,041	64.92%	Jai Kiran	INC	12,716	22.91%	23,325
29	Kiloi	68.02%	Krishan Hooda	LKD	33,650	60.20%	Bhupinder Singh Hooda	INC	18,627	33.32%	15,023
30	Rohtak	66.84%	Mangal Sein	BJP	35,672	48.58%	Kishan Das	INC	34,204	46.58%	1,468
31	Meham	71.83%	Devi Lal	LKD	45,576	67.18%	Sarup Singh	INC	19,595	28.89%	25,981
32	Kalanaur	65.86%	Jai Narian	BJP	30,996	60.06%	Kartar Devi	INC	17,211	33.35%	13,785
33	Beri	64.27%	Raghubir Singh	LKD	24,860	45.67%	Om Parkash	VHP	14,034	25.78%	10,826
34	Salhawas	64.06%	Ram Narain	LKD	33,920	58.98%	Raj Singh	INC	11,823	20.56%	22,097
35	Jhajjar	58.67%	Medhavi	IND	26,518	48.53%	Mage Ram	INC	13,150	24.07%	13,368
36	Badli, Haryana	67.47%	Dheer Pal Singh	LKD	35,451	62.08%	Man Phul Singh	INC	19,085	33.42%	16,366
37	Bahadurgarh	67.28%	Mange Ram	LKD	40,113	56.25%	Meher Singh	INC	14,793	20.74%	25,320
38	Baroda	76.16%	Kirpa Ram Punia	LKD	50,882	74.20%	Shyam Chand	INC	13,857	20.21%	37,025
39	Gohana	71.70%	Kishan Singh	LKD	32,894	45.07%	Rati Ram	INC	13,772	18.87%	19,122
40	Kailana	73.65%	Ved Singh	LKD	31,113	45.14%	Rajinder Singh	IND	13,499	19.59%	17,614
41	Sonipat	65.35%	Devi Dass	BJP	34,962	53.23%	Sham Dass	INC	19,217	29.26%	15,745
42	Rai	72.07%	Maha Singh	LKD	44,264	64.83%	Jaswant Singh	INC	18,305	26.81%	25,959
43	Rohat	66.88%	Mahendra	LKD	36,882	62.37%	Rizaq Ram	INC	16,570	28.02%	20,312
44	Kalayat	73.43%	Banarasi	LKD	41,872	68.92%	Baldev Singh	INC	16,582	27.29%	25,290
45	Narwana	78.74%	Tek Chand	LKD	48,741	68.35%	Shamsher Singh	INC	20,902	29.31%	27,839
46	Uchana Kalan	76.15%	Desh Raj	LKD	55,361	77.54%	Sube Singh	INC	10,113	14.16%	45,248
47	Rajound	76.06%	Durga Dutt	LKD	38,384	64.81%	Surat Singh	IND	10,183	17.19%	28,201
48	Jind	76.28%	Parma Nand	LKD	39,323	53.11%	Mange Ram Gupta	INC	31,221	42.17%	8,102
49	Julana	75.01%	Kulbir Singh	LKD	40,965	65.66%	Fateh Singh	INC	19,518	31.28%	21,447
50	Safidon	69.34%	Sardul Singh	IND	41,441	63.05%	Kundan Lal	INC	14,709	22.38%	26,732
51	Faridabad	62.95%	Kundan Lal Bhatia	BJP	43,475	44.20%	Akagar Chand Chaudhry	INC	40,838	41.51%	2,637
52	Mewla–Maharajpur	60.16%	Ch. Mahinder Pratap Singh	INC	37,448	42.72%	Gajraj Bhadur Nagar	IND	17,692	20.18%	19,756
53	Ballabgarh	60.10%	Yogesh Chand Sharma	LKD	37,832	50.22%	Sharda Rani	INC	21,756	28.88%	16,076
54	Palwal	70.90%	Subhash Chand	LKD	30,602	43.91%	Kishan Chand	INC	16,139	23.16%	14,463
55	Hassanpur	65.55%	Udaibhan	LKD	28,371	45.60%	Chhote Lal	INC	23,899	38.41%	4,472
56	Hathin	69.89%	Bhagwan Shai	LKD	17,260	27.51%	Ramji Lal	INC	9,984	15.91%	7,276
57	Ferozepur Jhirka	73.04%	Ajmat Khan	LKD	23,289	32.86%	Shakrulla Khan	INC	14,596	20.59%	8,693
58	Nuh	69.96%	Chaudhary Khurshid Ahmed	LKD	43,743	69.10%	Chaudhary Mohammad Ilyas	INC	15,773	24.92%	27,970
59	Taoru	79.76%	Tayab Hussain	INC	41,873	53.11%	Ravinder Kumar	IND	30,839	39.11%	11,034
60	Sohna	73.84%	Dharam Pal	IND	31,703	43.44%	Kanhaya Lal	INC	22,675	31.07%	9,028
61	Gurgaon	72.71%	Sita Ram Singla	BJP	48,596	59.83%	Dharam Vir Gawa	INC	24,545	30.22%	24,051
62	Pataudi	65.78%	Shiv Lal	LKD	38,400	59.73%	Narayan Singh	INC	21,421	33.32%	16,979
63	Badhra	67.69%	Ran Singh S/O Sheokaran	LKD	31,279	49.71%	Attar Singh Mandiwala	INC	26,423	41.99%	4,856
64	Dadri	66.37%	Hukam Singh	LKD	25,677	42.76%	Rishal Singh	INC	16,245	27.05%	9,432
65	Mundhal Khurd	68.00%	Vasudev	LKD	23,342	39.57%	Chhatar Singh	INC	15,216	25.80%	8,126
66	Bhiwani	74.37%	Banarsi Das Gupta	LKD	51,137	73.97%	Shiv Kumar	INC	15,946	23.07%	35,191
67	Tosham	69.71%	Dharambir	LKD	32,547	49.51%	Bansi Lal	INC	30,361	46.18%	2,186
68	Loharu	67.54%	Hira Nand	LKD	38,104	56.66%	Tusli Ram	INC	25,491	37.90%	12,613
69	Bawani Khera	67.47%	Jagan Nath	LKD	42,820	66.50%	Amar Singh	INC	19,481	30.25%	23,339
70	Barwala	73.27%	Surender	LKD	44,823	62.28%	Inder Singh Nain	INC	15,986	22.21%	28,837
71	Narnaund	76.77%	Virender Singh	LKD	45,476	68.95%	Sarup Singh	INC	18,978	28.78%	26,498
72	Hansi	74.49%	Pardeep Kumar Chaudhary	BJP	47,867	69.08%	Amir Chand	INC	18,436	26.61%	29,431
73	Bhattu Kalan	79.44%	Sampat Singh	LKD	42,251	60.57%	Mani Ram Godare	INC	24,534	35.17%	17,717
74	Hisar	69.41%	Hari Singh Saini	LKD	25,703	34.11%	Om Parkash Mahajan	INC	24,335	32.29%	1,368
75	Ghirai	73.95%	Atma Ram	LKD	36,157	51.79%	Suraesh Kumar	IND	14,907	21.35%	21,250
76	Tohana	73.41%	Harpal Singh	CPI(M)	30,261	42.80%	Paramvir Singh	INC	18,774	26.55%	11,487
77	Ratia	74.73%	Atama Singh	LKD	40,242	61.59%	Pir Chand	INC	21,995	33.67%	18,247
78	Fatehabad	70.81%	Balbir Singh Choudhary	BJP	43,479	58.52%	Prithvi Singh Gorkhpuria	CPI(M)	14,864	20.01%	28,615
79	Adampur	77.17%	Jasma Devi	INC	41,152	55.08%	Dharam Pal Singh	LKD	31,880	42.67%	9,272
80	Darba Kalan	79.73%	Vidya Beniwal	LKD	52,394	67.69%	Bahadar Singh	INC	23,263	30.06%	29,131
81	Ellenabad	78.36%	Bhagi Ram	LKD	43,912	58.74%	Mani Ram	INC	28,789	38.51%	15,123
82	Sirsa	75.24%	Hazar Chand	LKD	30,335	38.00%	Lachhman Dass Arora	INC	24,637	30.86%	5,698
83	Rori	81.25%	Ranjit Singh S\O Devi Lal	LKD	43,588	57.67%	Jagdish Nehra	INC	25,444	33.66%	18,144
84	Dabwali	73.89%	Mani Ram	LKD	47,652	64.72%	Govardhan Dass Chauhan	INC	18,930	25.71%	28,722
85	Bawal	64.48%	Muni Lal	LKD	25,717	38.33%	Shakuntla Bhagwaria	IND	21,117	31.47%	4,600
86	Rewari	70.93%	Raghu Yadav	LKD	38,694	55.38%	Hukam Chand	INC	16,368	23.42%	22,326
87	Jatusana	69.49%	Narbir Singh	LKD	40,592	53.73%	Inderjeet Singh	INC	31,367	41.52%	9,225
88	Mahendragarh	72.37%	Ram Bilas Sharma	BJP	44,481	57.87%	Hari Singh	INC	17,049	22.18%	27,432
89	Ateli	67.48%	Laxminarain	LKD	35,417	49.26%	Kheta Nath	INC	32,842	45.68%	2,575
90	Narnaul	70.04%	Kailash Chand Sharma	BJP	42,629	59.58%	Phusa Ram	INC	21,386	29.89%	21,243
