= 1982 Haryana Legislative Assembly election =

Election in India

- 19 May 1982

All 90 seats to the Haryana Legislative Assembly 45 seats needed for a majority
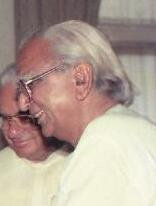

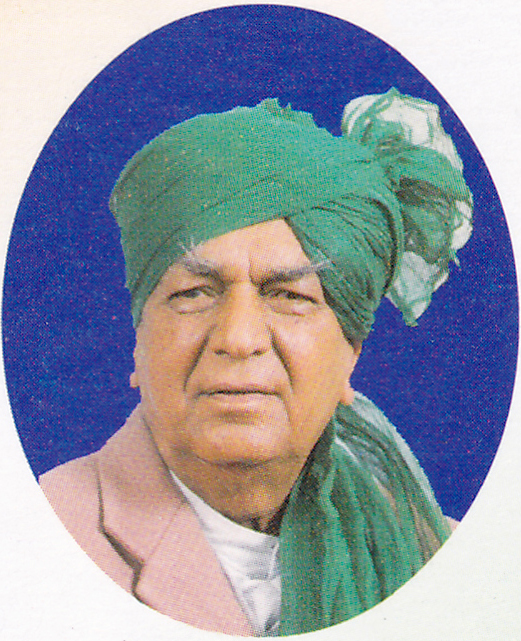
	First party	Second party
Leader	Bhajan Lal	Devi Lal
Party	INC(I)	LKD
Last election	3 seats	New Party
Seats won	36	31
Seat change	▲33	New Party
Popular vote	1,845,297	1,172,149
Percentage	37.58%	23.87%
Swing	▲20.43%	New Party
Chief Minister before election
Bhajan Lal
INC
Elected Chief Minister
Bhajan Lal
INC

Elections to the Haryana Legislative Assembly were held in the Indian state of Haryana in May 1982. No party gained a majority of seats. Incumbent Chief Minister Bhajan Lal of Congress staked claim to form government, was sworn in, and later proved his majority in the assembly. He remained the Chief Minister for the first 4 years of this assembly's term. For the last year, June 1986 to June 1987, he was replaced by Bansi Lal.

== Results ==
Party	Votes	%	Seats
Indian National Congress	1,845,297	37.58	36
Indian National Lok Dal	1,172,149	23.87	31
Bharatiya Janata Party	376,604	7.67	6
Janata Party	157,224	3.20	1
Communist Party of India	36,642	0.75	–
Communist Party of India (Marxist)	18,616	0.38	–
Indian National Congress (Socialist)	398	0.01	–
Independents	1,303,414	26.54	16
Total	4,910,344	100.00	90
Valid votes	4,910,344	98.26	
Invalid/blank votes	87,091	1.74	
Total votes	4,997,435	–	
Registered voters/turnout	715,228	698.72	
Source: ECIElectoral Commission of India

== Elected members ==
Winner, runner-up, voter turnout, and victory margin in every constituency
Assembly Constituency		Turnout	Winner				Runner Up				Margin
#k	Names	%	Candidate	Party	Votes	%	Candidate	Party	Votes	%	Margin
1	Kalka	71.64%	Lachhman Singh	Independent	22,544	39.68%	Sukhdev Singh	INC	15,006	26.41%	7,538
2	Naraingarh	74.80%	Lal Singh	Independent	18,091	34.63%	Jagjit Singh	INC	13,842	26.50%	4,249
3	Sadhaura	66.93%	Bhag Mal	BJP	20,981	40.08%	Parbhu Ram	INC	20,971	40.06%	10
4	Chhachhrauli	75.97%	Roshan Lal	LKD	17,493	33.07%	Abdul Rashid	INC	16,676	31.53%	817
5	Yamunanagar	70.20%	Rajesh Kumar	INC	16,289	29.24%	Kamla Verma	BJP	16,226	29.13%	63
6	Jagadhri	70.66%	Om Prakash Sharma	INC	20,639	41.28%	Brij Mohan	BJP	16,656	33.31%	3,983
7	Mulana	75.21%	Phool Chand	Independent	32,727	58.50%	Sher Singh	INC	18,394	32.88%	14,333
8	Ambala Cantt.	73.81%	Ram Dass Dhamija	INC	14,382	35.92%	Swami Agnivaish	JP	8,171	20.41%	6,211
9	Ambala City	69.50%	Shiv Prasad	BJP	21,847	47.38%	Sumer Chand	INC	18,646	40.43%	3,201
10	Naggal	77.48%	Nirmal Singh	INC	28,106	53.20%	Gurpal Singh	LKD	14,103	26.70%	14,003
11	Indri	70.20%	Lachhman	LKD	25,345	48.40%	Des Raj	INC	20,359	38.88%	4,986
12	Nilokheri	71.56%	Chanda Singh	Independent	18,874	37.11%	Shiv Ram	INC	15,141	29.77%	3,733
13	Karnal	69.70%	Shanti Devi	INC	30,267	56.62%	Ram Lal	BJP	17,618	32.96%	12,649
14	Jundla	57.05%	Sujan Singh	LKD	14,627	34.08%	Sagar Chand	INC	12,427	28.95%	2,200
15	Gharaunda	68.72%	Ved Pal	INC	12,646	23.89%	Om Prakash	Independent	11,898	22.48%	748
16	Assandh	57.17%	Manphool Singh	LKD	24,880	57.64%	Jogi Ram	INC	11,304	26.19%	13,576
17	Panipat	70.79%	Fateh Chand	BJP	26,467	47.46%	Kasturi Lal	INC	25,555	45.82%	912
18	Samalkha	70.64%	Katar Singh	INC	17,507	32.14%	Mool Chand	LKD	13,380	24.56%	4,127
19	Naultha	71.83%	Parsanni Devi	INC	17,152	32.49%	Satbir S/O Gaje Singh	LKD	16,713	31.66%	439
20	Shahbad	76.88%	Tara Singh	INC	19,507	36.09%	Raghubir Chand	BJP	19,276	35.66%	231
21	Radaur	72.43%	Ram Singh	Independent	21,759	43.78%	Lahri Singh	INC	15,265	30.72%	6,494
22	Thanesar	72.06%	Sahab Singh	LKD	22,893	43.23%	Om Parkash	INC	20,698	39.09%	2,195
23	Pehowa	73.81%	Piara Singh	INC	20,877	36.85%	Balbir Singh	Independent	18,928	33.41%	1,949
24	Guhla	70.12%	Dilu Ram	LKD	23,788	43.81%	Ran Singh	INC	19,884	36.62%	3,904
25	Kaithal	77.31%	Roshan Lal	Independent	20,996	40.39%	Davinder Shrma	INC	17,067	32.83%	3,929
26	Pundri	72.59%	Ishwar Singh	INC	22,392	42.26%	Bhag Singh	JP	21,837	41.21%	555
27	Pai	74.64%	Nar Singh Dhanda	LKD	24,816	45.61%	Tejender Pal Singh	INC	20,188	37.10%	4,628
28	Hassangarh	68.57%	Bananti Devi	LKD	30,344	60.78%	Anand	INC	16,683	33.41%	13,661
29	Kiloi	68.54%	Hari Chand	LKD	19,793	41.76%	Bhupinder Singh Hooda	INC	15,240	32.16%	4,553
30	Rohtak	72.07%	Mangal Sein	BJP	19,749	31.52%	Sat Ram Dass	INC	19,369	30.91%	380
31	Meham	69.81%	Devi Lal	LKD	36,324	62.87%	Har Sarup	INC	19,649	34.01%	16,675
32	Kalanaur	61.85%	Kartar Devi	INC	25,060	58.73%	Jai Narain	BJP	15,531	36.40%	9,529
33	Beri	64.50%	Om Parkash	LKD	27,536	57.74%	Dalip Singh	INC	15,347	32.18%	12,189
34	Salhawas	64.31%	Hukam Singh	Independent	15,746	31.92%	Ram Narain	Independent	14,551	29.50%	1,195
35	Jhajjar	55.85%	Banarasi Dass	LKD	24,163	53.61%	Mange Ram	INC	15,622	34.66%	8,541
36	Badli, Haryana	66.06%	Dheer Pal Singh	LKD	30,193	63.17%	Manphool Singh	INC	15,370	32.15%	14,823
37	Bahadurgarh	66.24%	Mange Ram S/O Daryao Singh	LKD	29,668	50.65%	Priya Vart	INC	19,477	33.25%	10,191
38	Baroda	71.77%	Bhalle Ram	LKD	36,159	64.94%	Sardara	INC	17,612	31.63%	18,547
39	Gohana	74.40%	Kitab Singh Malik	LKD	32,372	51.30%	Ramdhari Gaur	INC	24,940	39.52%	7,432
40	Kailana	72.23%	Rajinder Singh	Independent	19,395	34.19%	Chander Singh	LKD	16,577	29.22%	2,818
41	Sonipat	67.24%	Devi Dass	BJP	24,890	45.84%	Mohan Lal	INC	16,813	30.97%	8,077
42	Rai	68.03%	Jaswant Singh	INC	27,542	50.36%	Maha Singh	Independent	24,515	44.83%	3,027
43	Rohat	67.62%	Bhim Singh	LKD	28,952	56.17%	Shanti Devi	INC	17,971	34.86%	10,981
44	Kalayat	68.57%	Jogi Ram	LKD	27,228	56.94%	Baldev	INC	16,760	35.05%	10,468
45	Narwana	81.58%	Shamsher Singh	INC	25,672	41.55%	Tek Chand	LKD	19,848	32.13%	5,824
46	Uchana Kalan	75.34%	Birender Singh	INC	30,031	50.26%	Desh Raj	Independent	20,225	33.85%	9,806
47	Rajound	75.55%	Daya Nand	INC	21,229	42.01%	Dharam Bir	LKD	17,035	33.71%	4,194
48	Jind	76.20%	Brij Mohan	LKD	27,045	46.75%	Mange Ram Gupta	INC	26,899	46.50%	146
49	Julana	72.47%	Kulbir Singh	LKD	17,880	34.59%	Shamsher Singh	INC	12,723	24.62%	5,157
50	Safidon	73.08%	Kundan Lal	INC	17,303	31.28%	Satvir Singh	LKD	10,335	18.68%	6,968
51	Faridabad	62.59%	Akagar Chand Chaudhry	INC	34,983	49.46%	Kundan Lal	BJP	23,039	32.57%	11,944
52	Mewla–Maharajpur	62.71%	Mahendra Pratap Singh	LKD	39,008	62.39%	Gajraj Bahadur	INC	16,217	25.94%	22,791
53	Ballabgarh	69.86%	Sharda Rani	Independent	22,176	34.61%	Rajinder Singh S/O Gajraj Singh	INC	18,165	28.35%	4,011
54	Palwal	70.64%	Kalyan Singh	INC	23,463	41.98%	Subhash Chand	Independent	15,232	27.25%	8,231
55	Hassanpur	67.02%	Gir Raj Kishore	LKD	21,259	39.88%	Gaya Lal	Independent	14,755	27.68%	6,504
56	Hathin	67.43%	Azmat Khan	JP	12,828	24.81%	Khillan Singh	LKD	12,655	24.47%	173
57	Ferozepur Jhirka	71.21%	Shakrulla Khan	INC	12,552	21.93%	Banwari Lal	Independent	10,450	18.26%	2,102
58	Nuh	65.38%	Chaudhary Rahim Khan	Independent	15,554	32.61%	Chaudhary Sardar Khan	INC	14,416	30.23%	1,138
59	Taoru	70.83%	Kabir Ahmad	INC	17,531	30.50%	Ravinder Kumar	Independent	13,687	23.81%	3,844
60	Sohna	67.97%	Vijay Vir Singh	Independent	18,432	33.11%	Gyasi Ram	INC	13,904	24.97%	4,528
61	Gurgaon	67.34%	Dharambir	INC	24,809	42.78%	Sita Ram Singla	BJP	16,610	28.64%	8,199
62	Pataudi	64.83%	Mohan Lal	INC	22,739	42.70%	Narayan Singh	Independent	21,942	41.21%	797
63	Badhra	66.25%	Chandrawati	LKD	21,905	40.71%	Attar Singh	INC	20,808	38.67%	1,097
64	Dadri	68.32%	Hukam Singh	LKD	20,943	39.61%	Jagjit Singh	INC	16,439	31.09%	4,504
65	Mundhal Khurd	74.19%	Balbir Singh	LKD	25,019	44.50%	Bir Singh	INC	23,261	41.37%	1,758
66	Bhiwani	65.77%	Sagar Ram Gupta	INC	24,697	48.26%	Ramesh Chander	BJP	18,789	36.71%	5,908
67	Tosham	66.63%	Surender Singh	INC	33,283	60.83%	Om Parkash	LKD	7,655	13.99%	25,628
68	Loharu	63.21%	Hira Nand	LKD	25,108	46.42%	Ram Narain Singh	INC	16,124	29.81%	8,984
69	Bawani Khera	67.87%	Amar Singh	LKD	24,298	44.68%	Jagan Nath	INC	22,963	42.22%	1,335
70	Barwala	73.11%	Inder Singh Nain	INC	19,766	34.46%	Joginder Singh	Independent	14,141	24.65%	5,625
71	Narnaund	74.72%	Virender Singh	LKD	24,564	44.39%	Sarup Singh	INC	16,552	29.91%	8,012
72	Hansi	69.24%	Amir Chand	LKD	20,934	38.11%	Hari Singh	INC	17,141	31.21%	3,793
73	Bhattu Kalan	72.17%	Sampat Singh	Independent	28,780	53.85%	Ran Singh	INC	21,717	40.63%	7,063
74	Hisar	69.62%	Om Parkash Mahajan	Independent	17,890	33.13%	Baldev Tayal	JP	14,320	26.52%	3,570
75	Ghirai	68.52%	Kanwal Singh	LKD	17,975	33.63%	Suresh Kumar Mittal	Independent	15,814	29.58%	2,161
76	Tohana	75.76%	Harpal Singh	INC	31,184	52.93%	Bakshi Ram	Independent	23,792	40.38%	7,392
77	Ratia	63.80%	Neki Ram	INC	17,342	37.55%	Atma Singh	LKD	17,144	37.12%	198
78	Fatehabad	70.89%	Gobind Rai	INC	29,118	48.37%	Harminder Singh	LKD	20,112	33.41%	9,006
79	Adampur	77.89%	Bhajan Lal	INC	42,227	68.06%	Nar Singh Bishnoi	LKD	17,515	28.23%	24,712
80	Darba Kalan	78.70%	Bahadur Singh	INC	30,572	49.21%	Jagdish	LKD	27,983	45.05%	2,589
81	Ellenabad	79.32%	Bhagi Ram	LKD	32,341	52.27%	Mani Ram	INC	26,523	42.87%	5,818
82	Sirsa	73.68%	Lachhman Dass Arora	Independent	18,458	30.61%	Mahavir Prasad Ratusaria	BJP	16,678	27.66%	1,780
83	Rori	74.93%	Jagdish Mehra	INC	32,921	56.83%	Partap Singh	LKD	21,101	36.42%	11,820
84	Dabwali	71.30%	Govardhan Dass Chauhan	INC	27,234	47.69%	Mani Ram	LKD	26,694	46.74%	540
85	Bawal	63.89%	Shakuntla Bhagwaria	INC	33,534	59.21%	Murari Lal	LKD	15,022	26.52%	18,512
86	Rewari	73.07%	Ram Singh	Independent	32,378	53.22%	Sumitra Devi	INC	23,662	38.90%	8,716
87	Jatusana	64.05%	Inderjeet Singh	INC	28,994	47.81%	Maha Singh	LKD	17,912	29.54%	11,082
88	Mahendragarh	74.01%	Ram Bilas Sharma	BJP	34,096	50.46%	Dalip Singh	INC	25,735	38.08%	8,361
89	Ateli	63.48%	Nihal Singh	Independent	27,298	47.16%	Bansi Singh	INC	27,105	46.83%	193
90	Narnaul	65.13%	Phusa Ram	INC	25,671	45.53%	Kailash Chand Sharma	BJP	18,298	32.45%	7,373

== Controversy ==
In the 1982 election, the INC emerged as a single largest party with 36 seats but INLD and BJP has pre poll alliance and got 37 seats in total. As no party has clear cut majority, it resulted in a hung assembly and was left to governor's discretion to whom to call upon to form government.

G.D. Tapase (Governor of Haryana) first called on Devi Lal on 22 May 1982 (leader of INLD or LKD + BJP alliance) to prove his majority by morning of 24 May. But in mean time, Bhajan Lal fresh from his re-election as leader of the INC+Individuals(36+16=52) met the governor and was sworn in as Chief Minister.

But in election of 1987, haryana people gave a clear cut majority to LKD or INLD and BJP alliance with overwhelming majority of 76(60+16) out of 90 assembly seats whereas INC suffers a humiliating defeat and won just 5 out of 90 seats as compared 36 seats in last assemble election.

== See also ==
- Girraj Kishore Mahaur
