= 1967 Haryana Legislative Assembly election =

1967 assembly elections in Haryana

- 21 February 1967

All 81 seats in the Haryana Legislative Assembly 41 seats needed for a majority
- Registered: 4,387,980
- Turnout: 72.65%
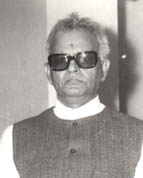

| | Majority party | Minority party |
|---|---|---|
| Leader | B. D. Sharma |
| Party | INC | ABJS |
| Seats won | 48 | 12 |
| Popular vote | 1,252,290 | 436,145 |
| Percentage | 41.33% | 14.39% |
CM before election
B. D. Sharma
INC
Elected CM
B. D. Sharma
INC

The first elections to the Haryana Legislative Assembly were held in February 1967 to elect members from all 81 constituencies in Haryana, India. The Indian National Congress won the popular vote and a majority of seats and Birender Singh was appointed as the Chief Minister of Haryana.

== Results ==
| Party | Votes | % | Seats |
|---|---|---|---|
| Indian National Congress | 1,252,290 | 41.33 | 48 |
| Bharatiya Jana Sangh | 436,145 | 14.39 | 12 |
| Sanghata Socialist Party | 108,172 | 3.57 | 0 |
| Swatantra Party | 96,410 | 3.18 | 3 |
| Republican Party of India | 87,861 | 2.90 | 2 |
| Communist Party of India | 27,238 | 0.90 | 0 |
| Communist Party of India (Marxist) | 16,379 | 0.54 | 0 |
| Praja Socialist Party | 6,477 | 0.21 | 0 |
| Independents | 998,969 | 32.97 | 16 |
| Total | 3,029,941 | 100.00 | 81 |
| Valid votes | 3,029,941 | 76.48 | |
| Invalid/blank votes | 931,825 | 23.52 | |
| Total votes | 3,187,946 | – | |
| Registered voters/turnout | 4,387,980 | 72.65 | |
Source: ECI

== Elected members ==
Winner, runner-up, voter turnout, and victory margin in every constituency
| Assembly Constituency | | Turnout | Winner | | | | Runner Up | | | | Margin |
| #k | Names | % | Candidate | Party | Votes | % | Candidate | Party | Votes | % | Margin |
|---|---|---|---|---|---|---|---|---|---|---|---|
| 1 | Kalka | 75.32 | Lachhman Singh | Independent | 12,787 | 32.39 | K. Lal | INC | 12,086 | 30.62 | 701 |
| 2 | Naraingarh | 70.03 | L. Singh | INC | 16,691 | 45.35 | R. N. Sarup | ABJS | 8,528 | 23.17 | 8,163 |
| 3 | Chhachhrauli | 68.98 | R. Parkash | INC | 15,525 | 42.48 | P. Chand | Independent | 14,605 | 39.97 | 920 |
| 4 | Jagadhri | 78.52 | D. Prakash | ABJS | 14,665 | 41.12 | G. Singh | INC | 12,856 | 36.05 | 1,809 |
| 5 | Yamunanagar | 75.87 | B. Dayal | INC | 22,043 | 52.43 | R. Lal | ABJS | 15,419 | 36.68 | 6,624 |
| 6 | Mulana | 64.84 | R. Prasad | RPI | 16,694 | 52.53 | S. Ram | INC | 12,321 | 38.77 | 4,373 |
| 7 | Naggal | 69.31 | Lakhwati | INC | 17,494 | 54.32 | M. Singh | Independent | 12,430 | 38.60 | 5,064 |
| 8 | Ambala Cantt. | 72.00 | Dev Raj Anand | INC | 11,343 | 41.65 | P. Nath | ABJS | 10,845 | 39.82 | 498 |
| 9 | Ambala City | 71.74 | Faqir Chand Aggarwal | ABJS | 15,887 | 50.50 | A. G. Khan | INC | 8,973 | 28.52 | 6,914 |
| 10 | Shahbad | 76.21 | Jagdish Chander | INC | 11,074 | 34.75 | K. Chand | ABJS | 10,778 | 33.83 | 296 |
| 11 | Thanesar | 77.57 | D. Prakash | INC | 18,659 | 52.49 | B. Singh | ABJS | 14,822 | 41.69 | 3,837 |
| 12 | Babain | 76.31 | Chand Ram | INC | 21,884 | 60.76 | R. Dia | ABJS | 11,724 | 32.55 | 10,160 |
| 13 | Nilokheri | 75.58 | S. Ram | ABJS | 10,605 | 33.81 | C. Singh | Independent | 9,294 | 29.63 | 1,311 |
| 14 | Indri | 75.39 | Parsani Devi | INC | 17,056 | 46.92 | T. Ram | ABJS | 5,885 | 16.19 | 11,171 |
| 15 | Karnal | 76.29 | Ram Lal | ABJS | 11,702 | 31.38 | L. Ram | INC | 9,215 | 24.71 | 2,487 |
| 16 | Jundla | 66.56 | Ram Kishan | INC | 10,843 | 34.69 | B. Ram | RPI | 10,696 | 34.22 | 147 |
| 17 | Gharaunda | 77.35 | M. Chand | INC | 13,906 | 34.27 | R. Singh | ABJS | 12,736 | 31.39 | 1,170 |
| 18 | Samalkha | 75.64 | Randhir | ABJS | 12,215 | 30.73 | K. Singh | INC | 12,101 | 30.45 | 114 |
| 19 | Panipat | 78.35 | Fateh Chand | ABJS | 20,459 | 49.71 | H. Rai | INC | 18,134 | 44.06 | 2,325 |
| 20 | Naultha | 77.66 | M. Singh | INC | 12,943 | 36.34 | D. Singh | Independent | 9,504 | 26.68 | 3,439 |
| 21 | Rajound | 72.67 | Ran Singh | INC | 16,992 | 41.81 | B. Singh | SWA | 10,932 | 26.90 | 6,060 |
| 22 | Pundri | 81.73 | R. P. Singh | INC | 20,143 | 49.04 | I. Singh | Independent | 13,670 | 33.28 | 6,473 |
| 23 | Serhada | 79.54 | P. A. J. Singh | Independent | 12,080 | 29.86 | S. Singh | INC | 11,641 | 28.78 | 439 |
| 24 | Kaithal | 78.02 | Om Parbha | INC | 21,933 | 51.56 | A. Chand | SWA | 20,015 | 47.05 | 1,918 |
| 25 | Pehowa | 70.96 | Chiman Lal | SWA | 13,010 | 34.47 | M. Singh | INC | 11,117 | 29.45 | 1,893 |
| 26 | Kalayat | 76.03 | Maru | SWA | 15,910 | 42.13 | B. Ram | INC | 15,552 | 41.18 | 358 |
| 27 | Narwana | 80.95 | S. Singh | RPI | 21,130 | 49.67 | K. Ram | INC | 19,611 | 46.10 | 1,519 |
| 28 | Jind | 74.65 | Daya Krishan | INC | 26,089 | 59.26 | I. Singh | Independent | 15,548 | 35.32 | 10,541 |
| 29 | Julana | 77.47 | Dal Singh | INC | 21,534 | 56.24 | G. Ram | ABJS | 12,211 | 31.89 | 9,323 |
| 30 | Safidon | 75.65 | S. Krishan | INC | 17,692 | 48.67 | S. Narain | Independent | 11,721 | 32.24 | 5,971 |
| 31 | Meham | 77.77 | M. Singh | Independent | 18,875 | 48.92 | B. Prasad | INC | 13,361 | 34.63 | 5,514 |
| 32 | Baroda | 68.51 | R. Dhari | INC | 13,164 | 36.24 | Darya Singh | ABJS | 11,637 | 32.04 | 1,527 |
| 33 | Gohana | 76.89 | Ram Dhari | INC | 19,898 | 51.30 | H. Kishan | Independent | 11,901 | 30.68 | 7,997 |
| 34 | Kailana | 78.43 | Rajinder Singh | INC | 18,847 | 48.58 | C. Lal | Independent | 17,436 | 44.94 | 1,411 |
| 35 | Sonipat | 75.96 | M. Lal | INC | 17,930 | 45.72 | M. Singh | ABJS | 17,035 | 43.44 | 895 |
| 36 | Rai | 67.04 | Rizaq Ram | INC | 20,115 | 53.54 | Banwari | Independent | 16,206 | 43.14 | 3,909 |
| 37 | Rohat | 67.04 | B. Singh | Independent | 13,001 | 41.85 | S. Ram | INC | 11,220 | 36.11 | 1,781 |
| 38 | Hassangarh | 72.84 | S. Chand | INC | 11,167 | 31.40 | H. Singh | Independent | 9,058 | 25.47 | 2,109 |
| 39 | Kiloi | 81.07 | Shreyo Nath | Independent | 21,079 | 53.78 | R. Singh | INC | 12,406 | 31.65 | 8,673 |
| 40 | Rohtak | 76.79 | Mangal Sein | ABJS | 23,672 | 55.39 | T. Chand | INC | 18,558 | 43.43 | 5,114 |
| 41 | Kalanaur | 76.12 | Nasib Singh | ABJS | 18,103 | 51.20 | S. Singh | INC | 9,972 | 28.20 | 8,131 |
| 42 | Beri | 76.62 | Partap Singh Doulta | INC | 22,577 | 52.50 | N. Kumar | Independent | 8,624 | 20.05 | 13,953 |
| 43 | Salhawas | 62.59 | P. Chand | INC | 14,219 | 37.60 | Amar Singh | Independent | 13,278 | 35.11 | 941 |
| 44 | Jhajjar | 78.74 | M. Singh | Independent | 15,024 | 31.66 | Chandan Singh | Independent | 11,279 | 23.77 | 3,745 |
| 45 | Bahadurgarh | 73.10 | Hardwari Lal | INC | 24,737 | 56.88 | Hari Singh | Independent | 11,726 | 26.96 | 13,011 |
| 46 | Faridabad | 64.98 | K. D. Kapil | INC | 13,037 | 31.93 | K. Kumar | Independent | 7,206 | 17.65 | 5,831 |
| 47 | Ballabgarh | 71.05 | T. Ram | INC | 15,308 | 36.95 | S. Singh | Independent | 12,906 | 31.15 | 2,402 |
| 48 | Palwal | 74.01 | Dhan Singh | Independent | 11,374 | 26.78 | M. Chand | ABJS | 11,012 | 25.93 | 362 |
| 49 | Hassanpur | 68.77 | Gaya Lal | Independent | 10,458 | 28.31 | M. Singh | INC | 10,098 | 27.34 | 360 |
| 50 | Ferozepur Jhirka | 70.20 | D. Mohammad | SWA | 19,040 | 52.60 | T. Huisain | INC | 17,160 | 47.40 | 1,880 |
| 51 | Nuh | 70.71 | Chaudhary Rahim Khan | Independent | 15,212 | 41.50 | K. Ahmed | INC | 14,171 | 38.66 | 1,041 |
| 52 | Hathin | 67.57 | D. Singh | INC | 17,921 | 50.18 | Rajinder Singh | Independent | 9,190 | 25.73 | 8,731 |
| 53 | Sohna | 73.20 | M. Singh | Independent | 15,733 | 40.28 | B. Dayal | INC | 13,051 | 33.42 | 2,682 |
| 54 | Gurgaon | 73.20 | Pratap Singh Thakran | ABJS | 20,792 | 52.82 | Kanhaya Lal | INC | 16,567 | 42.09 | 4,225 |
| 55 | Pataudi | 79.53 | B. Singh | INC | 22,517 | 50.25 | S. Ram | Independent | 21,531 | 48.05 | 986 |
| 56 | Rewari | 70.46 | Sumitra Devi | INC | 18,474 | 56.00 | Abhai Singh | ABJS | 13,108 | 39.73 | 5,366 |
| 57 | Bawal | 58.12 | Kanhia Lal | Independent | 8,227 | 29.08 | R. Parshad | Independent | 7,739 | 27.35 | 488 |
| 58 | Jatusana | 66.89 | J. Singh | Independent | 18,443 | 48.48 | N. Singh | INC | 16,742 | 44.01 | 1,701 |
| 59 | Ateli | 67.03 | N. Singh | INC | 17,607 | 48.78 | R. Jiwan | Independent | 16,640 | 46.10 | 967 |
| 60 | Narnaul | 65.76 | B. Lal | ABJS | 10,330 | 32.43 | Ram Saran Chand Mittal | INC | 9,776 | 30.69 | 554 |
| 61 | Mahendragarh | 65.38 | Hari Singh | Independent | 9,558 | 29.05 | R. Singh | Independent | 8,636 | 26.24 | 922 |
| 62 | Kanina | 64.79 | Dalip Singh | Independent | 17,381 | 56.13 | B. Dhar | INC | 12,236 | 39.51 | 5,145 |
| 63 | Badhra | 69.94 | Attar Singh | Independent | 15,003 | 37.13 | Chandrawati | INC | 9,635 | 23.84 | 5,368 |
| 64 | Dadri | 68.59 | Ganpat Rai | INC | 13,782 | 38.70 | Harnam Singh | SSP | 12,400 | 34.82 | 1,382 |
| 65 | Loharu | 69.15 | Hira Nand | INC | 16,240 | 45.79 | T. Ram | SSP | 13,111 | 36.97 | 3,129 |
| 66 | Tosham | 68.72 | Bansi Lal | INC | 11,511 | 33.98 | M. R. D. Ram | SSP | 6,142 | 18.13 | 5,369 |
| 67 | Bhiwani | 72.60 | Bhagwan Dev | ABJS | 17,591 | 49.74 | Sagar Ram Gupta | INC | 13,423 | 37.96 | 4,168 |
| 68 | Mundhal Khurd | 74.95 | J. Singh | Independent | 11,163 | 32.00 | S. Singh | INC | 9,985 | 28.62 | 1,178 |
| 69 | Narnaund | 74.96 | R. Datt | INC | 13,417 | 35.03 | J. Singh | Independent | 10,391 | 27.13 | 3,026 |
| 70 | Hansi | 75.73 | Hari Singh | INC | 16,435 | 43.23 | K. Singh | Independent | 6,771 | 17.81 | 9,664 |
| 71 | Bawani Khera | 65.92 | Jagan Nath | INC | 17,179 | 53.72 | F. Singh | Independent | 6,866 | 21.47 | 10,313 |
| 72 | Adampur | 74.34 | H. Singh | INC | 16,955 | 43.41 | R. Singh | Independent | 16,704 | 42.77 | 251 |
| 73 | Hisar | 69.75 | S. Lata | INC | 11,285 | 31.55 | B. Rai | Independent | 11,061 | 30.93 | 224 |
| 74 | Barwala | 71.43 | P. Singh | INC | 19,936 | 53.75 | A. Singh | SSP | 13,423 | 36.19 | 6,513 |
| 75 | Tohana | 70.08 | Harpal Singh | INC | 19,196 | 51.90 | S. Singh | SSP | 13,534 | 36.59 | 5,662 |
| 76 | Fatehabad | 70.08 | Gobind Rai | INC | 22,830 | 52.09 | M. Ram | Independent | 9,660 | 22.04 | 13,170 |
| 77 | Badopal | 78.11 | M. Ram | INC | 27,034 | 65.96 | C. Lal | Independent | 9,289 | 22.66 | 17,745 |
| 78 | Sirsa | 69.78 | L. Dass | ABJS | 18,805 | 51.25 | S. Ram | INC | 13,738 | 37.44 | 5,067 |
| 79 | Rori | 70.17 | P. S. Dass | INC | 18,432 | 43.51 | D. Singh | Independent | 15,260 | 36.02 | 3,172 |
| 80 | Dabwali | 64.80 | Kesra Ram | INC | 15,221 | 46.41 | P. Chander | Independent | 14,351 | 43.75 | 870 |
| 81 | Ellenabad | 72.58 | P. Singh | INC | 20,208 | 51.18 | Lal Chand | Independent | 17,561 | 44.47 | 2,647 |

== See also ==
- List of constituencies of the Haryana Legislative Assembly
- 1967 elections in India
