= Naultha Assembly constituency =

Constituency of the Haryana legislative assembly in India

Coordinates: 29.31°N 76.90°E

- Former constituency for the Haryana Legislative Assembly

Constituency details
- Country: India
- Region: North India
- State: Haryana
- Established: 1967
- Abolished: 2005
- Total electors: 1,27,220

Naultha Assembly constituency was an assembly constituency in the India state of Haryana.

== Members of the Legislative Assembly ==
Election	Member	Party
1967	M. Singh	Indian National Congress
1968	Jai Singh	Indian National Congress
1972	Mansa Ram	Indian National Congress
1977	Satbir S/O Arjan	Janata Party
1982	Parsanni Devi	Indian National Congress
1987	Satbir S/O Gaje Singh	Lokdal
1991	Satbir Singh Kadiyan	Janata Party
1996	Bijender	Haryana Vikas Party
2000	Satbir Singh Kadiyan	Indian National Lok Dal
2005	Parsanni Devi	Indian National Congress

== Election results ==
=== Assembly Election 2005 ===
2005 Haryana Legislative Assembly election: Naultha
Party	Candidate	Votes	%	±%
INC	Parsanni Devi	37,396	39.55%	▲25.55
INLD	Ramrati Jaglan	34,906	36.92%	▼17.54
BRP	Satbir Singh Malik	9,195	9.72%	New
BSP	Jagvir Arya	7,318	7.74%	▼15.80
BJP	Balwan Singh	5,050	5.34%	New
LJP	Rajkumar	677	0.72%	New
Margin of victory		2,490	2.63%	▼28.28
Turnout		94,553	74.32%	▲1.39
Registered electors		1,27,220		▲12.58
INC gain from INLD		Swing	▼14.91	

=== Assembly Election 2000 ===
2000 Haryana Legislative Assembly election: Naultha
Party	Candidate	Votes	%	±%
INLD	Satbir Singh Kadiyan	44,882	54.46%	New
BSP	Ranjeet	19,401	23.54%	▲11.02
INC	Parsanni Devi	11,539	14.00%	▼1.26
Independent	Jagvir Arya	3,154	3.83%	New
CPI	Daya Ram	1,017	1.23%	New
HVP	Ram Kishan	995	1.21%	▼30.03
Independent	Sarup Singh	722	0.88%	New
Independent	Jai Bhagwan	704	0.85%	New
Margin of victory		25,481	30.92%	▲29.50
Turnout		82,414	72.93%	▲1.92
Registered electors		1,13,005		▲1.12
INLD gain from HVP		Swing	▲23.22	

=== Assembly Election 1996 ===
1996 Haryana Legislative Assembly election: Naultha
Party	Candidate	Votes	%	±%
HVP	Bijender	24,790	31.24%	New
SAP	Satbir Singh Kadiyan	23,667	29.82%	New
INC	Satbir	12,113	15.26%	▼20.91
BSP	Raj Bala	9,938	12.52%	New
Independent	Balwan Singh	3,420	4.31%	New
JD	Kehar Singh	1,214	1.53%	▼17.49
AIIC(T)	Nafe Singh	1,212	1.53%	New
Independent	Maman Chand Bijlan	834	1.05%	New
Independent	Randhir Singh	634	0.80%	New
AIFB	Sita Ram	456	0.57%	New
Margin of victory		1,123	1.42%	▼0.04
Turnout		79,357	74.13%	▲3.44
Registered electors		1,11,756		▲15.57
HVP gain from JP		Swing	▼6.38	

=== Assembly Election 1991 ===
1991 Haryana Legislative Assembly election: Naultha
Party	Candidate	Votes	%	±%
JP	Satbir Singh Kadiyan	24,582	37.62%	▲33.79
INC	Satbir Singh Malik	23,634	36.17%	▲17.37
JD	Satbir Singh Kundu	12,427	19.02%	New
BJP	Dharampal Singh	1,816	2.78%	New
Independent	Sher Singh Chasgar	513	0.79%	New
Independent	Jeet Ram Lohar	478	0.73%	New
Independent	Balbir Singh	346	0.53%	New
Margin of victory		948	1.45%	▼42.49
Turnout		65,341	70.21%	▼6.11
Registered electors		96,704		▲6.93
JP gain from LKD		Swing	▼25.13	

=== Assembly Election 1987 ===
1987 Haryana Legislative Assembly election: Naultha
Party	Candidate	Votes	%	±%
LKD	Satbir S/O Gaje Singh	41,808	62.75%	▲31.09
INC	Parsanni Devi	12,528	18.80%	▼13.68
Independent	Girdhari Lal	4,454	6.68%	New
JP	Satbir S/O Arjan	2,555	3.83%	New
Independent	Om Parkash	2,468	3.70%	New
Independent	Chand Ram	672	1.01%	New
Independent	Jeet Ram Lohar	518	0.78%	New
Independent	Ram Phal	516	0.77%	New
Independent	Kishni Devi	450	0.68%	New
Margin of victory		29,280	43.94%	▲43.11
Turnout		66,630	74.53%	▲3.08
Registered electors		90,434		▲20.92
LKD gain from INC		Swing	▲30.26	

=== Assembly Election 1982 ===
1982 Haryana Legislative Assembly election: Naultha
Party	Candidate	Votes	%	±%
INC	Parsanni Devi	17,152	32.49%	▲10.88
LKD	Satbir S/O Gaje Singh	16,713	31.66%	New
Independent	Randhir Singh	5,887	11.15%	New
Independent	Om Parkash	5,298	10.03%	New
Independent	Sajjan Singh	4,041	7.65%	New
CPI	Surat Singh	2,366	4.48%	New
Independent	Zile Singh	444	0.84%	New
Independent	Partap Singh	428	0.81%	New
Margin of victory		439	0.83%	▼32.50
Turnout		52,796	71.83%	▲4.93
Registered electors		74,787		▲22.51
INC gain from JP		Swing	▼22.45	

=== Assembly Election 1977 ===
1977 Haryana Legislative Assembly election: Naultha
Party	Candidate	Votes	%	±%
JP	Satbir S/O Arjan	22,023	54.94%	New
INC	Mansa Ram	8,662	21.61%	▼30.60
Independent	Dharampal Singh	6,531	16.29%	New
Independent	Manphool Singh Alias Manphoola	1,046	2.61%	New
Independent	Abha	708	1.77%	New
RPI	Prabha Ram	693	1.73%	New
Independent	Phool Wati	353	0.88%	New
Margin of victory		13,361	33.33%	▲23.98
Turnout		40,087	66.57%	▼6.03
Registered electors		61,047		▲10.08
JP gain from INC		Swing	▲2.73	

=== Assembly Election 1972 ===
1972 Haryana Legislative Assembly election: Naultha
Party	Candidate	Votes	%	±%
INC	Mansa Ram	20,760	52.21%	▼1.76
Independent	Amar Singh	17,042	42.86%	New
RPI(K)	Partap Singh	1,961	4.93%	New
Margin of victory		3,718	9.35%	▼0.24
Turnout		39,763	73.73%	▲12.07
Registered electors		55,457		▲10.64
INC hold		Swing		

=== Assembly Election 1968 ===
1968 Haryana Legislative Assembly election: Naultha
Party	Candidate	Votes	%	±%
INC	Jai Singh	16,130	53.97%	▲17.63
VHP	Inder Singh	13,264	44.38%	New
Independent	Amar Singh	275	0.92%	New
Independent	Bhagwan Dass	220	0.74%	New
Margin of victory		2,866	9.59%	▼0.07
Turnout		29,889	60.96%	▼13.47
Registered electors		50,124		▲2.88
INC hold		Swing	▲17.63	

=== Assembly Election 1967 ===
1967 Haryana Legislative Assembly election: Naultha
Party	Candidate	Votes	%	±%
INC	M. Singh	12,943	36.34%	New
Independent	D. Singh	9,504	26.68%	New
Independent	S. Singh	3,461	9.72%	New
Independent	M. Singh	2,915	8.18%	New
Independent	Bhagwan Dass	2,272	6.38%	New
Independent	N. Singh	1,932	5.42%	New
RPI	B. Ram	1,391	3.91%	New
Independent	D. Chand	898	2.52%	New
Independent	R. Sharma	303	0.85%	New
Margin of victory		3,439	9.65%	
Turnout		35,619	77.66%	
Registered electors		48,723		
INC win (new seat)				
