= Kailana Assembly constituency =

Constituency of the Haryana legislative assembly in India

Coordinates: 29.11°N 76.91°E

- Former constituency for the Haryana Legislative Assembly

Constituency details
- Country: India
- Region: North India
- State: Haryana
- Established: 1967
- Abolished: 2005
- Total electors: 1,28,649

Kailana Assembly constituency was an assembly constituency in the India state of Haryana.

== Members of the Legislative Assembly ==
Election	Member	Party
1967	Rajinder Singh	Indian National Congress
1968	Rajinder Singh	Vishal Haryana Party
1972	Partap Singh Tyagi	Independent politician
1977	Shanti Devi	Janata Party
1982	Rajinder Singh	Independent politician
1987	Ved Singh	Lokdal
1991	Shanti Devi	Indian National Congress
1996	Ramesh Chander	Haryana Vikas Party
2000	Jitender Singh	Indian National Congress
2005	Jitender Singh	Indian National Congress

== Election results ==
=== Assembly Election 2005 ===
2005 Haryana Legislative Assembly election: Kailana
Party	Candidate	Votes	%	±%
INC	Jitender Singh	33,787	35.57%	▼7.22
Independent	Nirmal Rani	28,596	30.10%	New
INLD	Subhash	15,573	16.39%	▼25.51
BSP	Telu Ram	8,517	8.97%	▲7.82
BJP	Seth Pal	4,109	4.33%	New
BRP	Om Prakash	1,104	1.16%	New
Independent	Surat Singh	997	1.05%	New
CPI	Daryav Singh	827	0.87%	New
Independent	Surender Kumar	474	0.50%	New
Independent	Devender	447	0.47%	New
Margin of victory		5,191	5.46%	▲4.58
Turnout		94,990	73.84%	▲2.10
Registered electors		1,28,649		▲10.77
INC hold		Swing	▼7.22	

=== Assembly Election 2000 ===
2000 Haryana Legislative Assembly election: Kailana
Party	Candidate	Votes	%	±%
INC	Jitender Singh	35,653	42.79%	▲39.36
INLD	Ved Singh	34,913	41.90%	New
Independent	Nirmal Rani	10,145	12.18%	New
Independent	Mahabir Singh Sharma	1,030	1.24%	New
BSP	Daya Nand	953	1.14%	▼2.79
HVP	Nirpal	621	0.75%	▼29.72
Margin of victory		740	0.89%	▼1.19
Turnout		83,315	72.02%	▲2.43
Registered electors		1,16,137		▲0.55
INC gain from HVP		Swing	▲12.33	

=== Assembly Election 1996 ===
1996 Haryana Legislative Assembly election: Kailana
Party	Candidate	Votes	%	±%
HVP	Ramesh Chander	24,390	30.47%	▲14.10
SAP	Ved Singh	22,724	28.38%	New
Independent	Jitender Singh	18,446	23.04%	New
BSP	Vinod	3,147	3.93%	New
Independent	Jai Bhagwan	2,913	3.64%	New
INC	Shanti Devi	2,751	3.44%	▼41.69
JD	Amarnath	991	1.24%	New
Janhit Morcha	Nanhi	734	0.92%	New
Independent	Ranbir S/O Ram Sarup	714	0.89%	New
Margin of victory		1,666	2.08%	▼9.90
Turnout		80,059	71.73%	▲4.97
Registered electors		1,15,505		▲8.93
HVP gain from INC		Swing	▼14.66	

=== Assembly Election 1991 ===
1991 Haryana Legislative Assembly election: Kailana
Party	Candidate	Votes	%	±%
INC	Shanti Devi	30,782	45.12%	▲26.82
JP	Bed Singh Malik	22,609	33.14%	New
HVP	Ramesh Chander	11,163	16.36%	New
BJP	Kishan Dayal	1,914	2.81%	New
Independent	Bal Kishan	463	0.68%	New
Margin of victory		8,173	11.98%	▼13.58
Turnout		68,219	66.76%	▼8.29
Registered electors		1,06,033		▲11.74
INC gain from LKD		Swing	▼0.02	

=== Assembly Election 1987 ===
1987 Haryana Legislative Assembly election: Kailana
Party	Candidate	Votes	%	±%
LKD	Ved Singh	31,113	45.14%	▲15.92
Independent	Rajinder Singh	13,499	19.59%	New
INC	Ashok Kumar	12,611	18.30%	▼9.36
Independent	Shanti Devi	9,735	14.12%	New
Independent	Prithi Singh S/O Jage Ram	904	1.31%	New
Margin of victory		17,614	25.56%	▲20.59
Turnout		68,921	73.65%	▲2.09
Registered electors		94,896		▲18.01
LKD gain from Independent		Swing	▲10.95	

=== Assembly Election 1982 ===
1982 Haryana Legislative Assembly election: Kailana
Party	Candidate	Votes	%	±%
Independent	Rajinder Singh	19,395	34.19%	New
LKD	Chander Singh	16,577	29.22%	New
INC	Jagdeep Singh	15,686	27.65%	▲23.14
CPI	Nanak Gir	1,954	3.44%	▲0.27
Independent	Moji Ram	1,431	2.52%	New
Independent	Ram Kanwar	530	0.93%	New
Independent	Subhash	429	0.76%	New
Margin of victory		2,818	4.97%	▼6.06
Turnout		56,724	72.23%	▲4.70
Registered electors		80,416		▲20.36
Independent gain from JP		Swing	▼9.68	

=== Assembly Election 1977 ===
1977 Haryana Legislative Assembly election: Kailana
Party	Candidate	Votes	%	±%
JP	Shanti Devi	19,299	43.87%	New
VHP	Rajinder Singh	14,449	32.85%	New
Independent	Partap Singh Tyagi	5,636	12.81%	New
INC	Fateh Singh	1,985	4.51%	▼43.08
CPI	Nanak Gir	1,396	3.17%	New
Independent	Balbir Singh Gulia	541	1.23%	New
Independent	Prem Singh	387	0.88%	New
Independent	Ramdiya	297	0.68%	New
Margin of victory		4,850	11.03%	▲8.63
Turnout		43,990	66.65%	▼8.75
Registered electors		66,815		▲11.44
JP gain from Independent		Swing	▼6.12	

=== Assembly Election 1972 ===
1972 Haryana Legislative Assembly election: Kailana
Party	Candidate	Votes	%	±%
Independent	Partap Singh Tyagi	22,353	49.99%	New
INC	Rajinder Singh	21,283	47.60%	▲3.43
Independent	Balbir Singh Gulia	1,080	2.42%	New
Margin of victory		1,070	2.39%	▼3.31
Turnout		44,716	76.15%	▲13.27
Registered electors		59,954		▲7.70
Independent gain from VHP		Swing		

=== Assembly Election 1968 ===
1968 Haryana Legislative Assembly election: Kailana
Party	Candidate	Votes	%	±%
VHP	Rajinder Singh	17,026	49.88%	New
INC	Partap Singh Tyagi	15,078	44.17%	▼4.41
Independent	Prem Singh	1,430	4.19%	New
Independent	Tara Chand	602	1.76%	New
Margin of victory		1,948	5.71%	▲2.07
Turnout		34,136	62.69%	▼14.17
Registered electors		55,670		▲8.32
VHP gain from INC		Swing	▲1.30	

=== Assembly Election 1967 ===
1967 Haryana Legislative Assembly election: Kailana
Party	Candidate	Votes	%	±%
INC	Rajinder Singh	18,847	48.58%	New
Independent	C. Lal	17,436	44.94%	New
Independent	D. Singh	1,126	2.90%	New
CPI	C. Singh	807	2.08%	New
Independent	S. Chand	463	1.19%	New
Margin of victory		1,411	3.64%	
Turnout		38,798	78.43%	
Registered electors		51,395		
INC win (new seat)				
