= Rajound Assembly constituency =

Constituency of the Haryana legislative assembly in India

Coordinates: 29°34′35″N 76°28′56″E

- Former constituency for the Haryana Legislative Assembly

Constituency details
- Country: India
- Region: North India
- State: Haryana
- Established: 1967
- Abolished: 2005
- Total electors: 1,05,665

Rajound Assembly constituency was an assembly constituency in the India state of Haryana.

== Members of the Legislative Assembly ==
Election	Member	Party
1967	Ran Singh	Indian National Congress
1968	Ran Singh	Indian National Congress
1972	Jogi Ram	Indian National Congress
1977	Guljar Singh	Janata Party
1982	Daya Nand	Indian National Congress
1987	Durga Dutt	Lokdal
1991	Ram Kumar	Janata Party
1996	Satvinder Singh	All India Indira Congress
2000	Ram Kumar	Indian National Lok Dal
2005	Balraj	Indian National Lok Dal

== Election results ==
=== Assembly Election 2005 ===
2005 Haryana Legislative Assembly election: Rajound
Party	Candidate	Votes	%	±%
INLD	Balraj	32,579	42.50%	▲17.09
INC	Satvinder singh	28357	38.08%	▲0.90
BJP	Pooja Sharma	8,295	10.42%	New
BSP	Nand Kishore	5,657	7.11%	▲1.72
BRP	Dinesh	3,806	4.78%	New
LJP	Aman Kumar	892	1.12%	New
Margin of victory		2,797	3.51%	▼9.16
Turnout		79,594	75.33%	▲5.25
Registered electors		1,05,665		▲7.99
INLD gain from INC		Swing	▲4.42	

=== Assembly Election 2000 ===
2000 Haryana Legislative Assembly election: Rajound
Party	Candidate	Votes	%	±%
INLD	Ram Kumar	24,415	35.61%	New
INC	Satvinder Singh	15,726	22.94%	▲12.45
Independent	Nand Kishore	11,926	17.39%	New
Independent	Daya Nand	5,016	7.32%	New
Independent	Rajpal	4,011	5.85%	New
BSP	Virender	3,697	5.39%	▼2.61
Independent	Chander Bhan	1,809	2.64%	New
Independent	Mahender	999	1.46%	New
HVP	Nirmal	616	0.90%	New
Margin of victory		8,689	12.67%	▲8.24
Turnout		68,566	70.68%	▲2.31
Registered electors		97,850		▲0.52
INLD gain from AIIC(T)		Swing	▲8.05	

=== Assembly Election 1996 ===
1996 Haryana Legislative Assembly election: Rajound
Party	Candidate	Votes	%	±%
AIIC(T)	Satvinder Singh	18,179	27.56%	New
SAP	Ram Kumar	15,255	23.13%	New
BJP	Om Parkash	13,168	19.96%	▲16.84
INC	Ram Pal	6,913	10.48%	▼21.91
BSP	Jagdish	5,280	8.00%	New
Independent	Satish	1,495	2.27%	New
CPI(M)	Ram Chander	938	1.42%	New
Independent	Chander Bhan	832	1.26%	New
Independent	Satbir	577	0.87%	New
Janhit Morcha	Suresh Kumar	527	0.80%	New
JD	Guljar Singh	393	0.60%	▼17.15
Margin of victory		2,924	4.43%	▼0.22
Turnout		65,959	70.87%	▲2.13
Registered electors		97,341		▲13.41
AIIC(T) gain from JP		Swing	▼9.48	

=== Assembly Election 1991 ===
1991 Haryana Legislative Assembly election: Rajound
Party	Candidate	Votes	%	±%
JP	Ram Kumar	20,864	37.04%	▲36.18
INC	Satvinder Singh	18,245	32.39%	▲20.28
JD	Dharam Bir	9,999	17.75%	New
Independent	Bharat Singh	3,525	6.26%	New
BJP	Som Dutt	1,762	3.13%	New
Independent	Balwan	903	1.60%	New
Margin of victory		2,619	4.65%	▼42.97
Turnout		56,330	68.44%	▼9.46
Registered electors		85,829		▲8.82
JP gain from LKD		Swing	▼27.77	

=== Assembly Election 1987 ===
1987 Haryana Legislative Assembly election: Rajound
Party	Candidate	Votes	%	±%
LKD	Durga Dutt	38,384	64.81%	▲31.10
Independent	Surat Singh	10,183	17.19%	New
INC	Daya Nand	7,173	12.11%	▼29.90
Independent	Chander Bhan	1,047	1.77%	New
Independent	Som Dutt	601	1.01%	New
JP	Ram Dhari	508	0.86%	New
Independent	Jog Dhian	380	0.64%	New
Independent	Lakhmi Chand	376	0.63%	New
Margin of victory		28,201	47.62%	▲39.32
Turnout		59,224	76.06%	▲0.70
Registered electors		78,870		▲16.09
LKD gain from INC		Swing	▲22.80	

=== Assembly Election 1982 ===
1982 Haryana Legislative Assembly election: Rajound
Party	Candidate	Votes	%	±%
INC	Daya Nand	21,229	42.01%	▲26.46
LKD	Dharam Bir	17,035	33.71%	New
Independent	Ram Pal	10,753	21.28%	New
Independent	Jagjit Singh Pohloo	459	0.91%	New
Independent	Ram Kishan	415	0.82%	New
Margin of victory		4,194	8.30%	▼16.16
Turnout		50,537	75.55%	▲8.66
Registered electors		67,936		▲16.36
INC gain from JP		Swing	▲2.00	

=== Assembly Election 1977 ===
1977 Haryana Legislative Assembly election: Rajound
Party	Candidate	Votes	%	±%
JP	Guljar Singh	15,353	40.01%	New
INC	Parsanni Devi	5,968	15.55%	▼12.21
Independent	Shishupal Singh	5,559	14.49%	New
Independent	Harbalas	4,675	12.18%	New
Independent	Surat Singh	3,924	10.23%	New
Independent	Daljit Singh	1,323	3.45%	New
Independent	Ram Kishan	1,123	2.93%	New
Independent	Balwan	451	1.18%	New
Margin of victory		9,385	24.46%	▼1.06
Turnout		38,376	66.51%	▲2.57
Registered electors		58,383		▼15.26
JP gain from INC(O)		Swing	▼13.27	

=== Assembly Election 1972 ===
1972 Haryana Legislative Assembly election: Rajound
Party	Candidate	Votes	%	±%
INC(O)	Jogi Ram	23,185	53.28%	New
INC	Ran Singh	12,080	27.76%	▼24.30
Independent	Kapoor Chand	5,302	12.18%	New
Independent	Bhim Singh	2,952	6.78%	New
Margin of victory		11,105	25.52%	▲2.81
Turnout		43,519	65.22%	▲27.26
Registered electors		68,899		▲11.13
INC(O) gain from INC		Swing	▲1.22	

=== Assembly Election 1968 ===
1968 Haryana Legislative Assembly election: Rajound
Party	Candidate	Votes	%	±%
INC	Ran Singh	11,588	52.06%	▲10.25
VHP	Jogi Ram	6,534	29.35%	New
SWA	Khazan Singh	2,461	11.06%	▼15.84
RPI	Phool Chand	1,677	7.53%	New
Margin of victory		5,054	22.70%	▲7.79
Turnout		22,260	36.82%	▼30.78
Registered electors		61,998		▲1.72
INC hold		Swing	▲10.25	

=== Assembly Election 1967 ===
1967 Haryana Legislative Assembly election: Rajound
Party	Candidate	Votes	%	±%
INC	Ran Singh	16,992	41.81%	New
SWA	B. Singh	10,932	26.90%	New
Independent	B. Lal	7,832	19.27%	New
CPI	M. Singh	2,338	5.75%	New
Independent	M. Lal	1,444	3.55%	New
Independent	Surta	793	1.95%	New
Independent	Sadhu	312	0.77%	New
Margin of victory		6,060	14.91%	
Turnout		40,643	72.67%	
Registered electors		60,950		
INC win (new seat)				
