= Kanina Assembly constituency =

Constituency of the Haryana legislative assembly in India

Coordinates: 28.29°N 76.20°E

- Former constituency for the Haryana Legislative Assembly

Constituency details
- Country: India
- Region: North India
- State: Haryana
- Established: 1967
- Abolished: 1972
- Total electors: 60,804

Kanina Assembly constituency was an assembly constituency in the India state of Haryana.

== Members of the Legislative Assembly ==
Election	Member	Party
1967	Dalip Singh	Independent politician
1968	Dalip Singh	Vishal Haryana Party
1972	Dalip Singh	Vishal Haryana Party

== Election results ==
=== Assembly Election 1972 ===
1972 Haryana Legislative Assembly election: Kanina
Party	Candidate	Votes	%	±%
VHP	Dalip Singh	20,261	54.18%	▼9.56
INC	Onkar Singh	17,134	45.82%	▲12.24
Margin of victory		3,127	8.36%	▼21.80
Turnout		37,395	63.40%	▲5.65
Registered electors		60,804		▲17.55
VHP hold		Swing		

=== Assembly Election 1968 ===
1968 Haryana Legislative Assembly election: Kanina
Party	Candidate	Votes	%	±%
VHP	Dalip Singh	18,413	63.74%	New
INC	Lal Singh	9,700	33.58%	▼5.94
Independent	Hari Singh	390	1.35%	New
Independent	Chiranji	385	1.33%	New
Margin of victory		8,713	30.16%	▲13.55
Turnout		28,888	58.28%	▼5.92
Registered electors		51,727		▲3.18
VHP gain from Independent		Swing	▲7.61	

=== Assembly Election 1967 ===
1967 Haryana Legislative Assembly election: Kanina
Party	Candidate	Votes	%	±%
Independent	Dalip Singh	17,381	56.13%	New
INC	B. Dhar	12,236	39.51%	New
SSP	Hari Singh	1,014	3.27%	New
Independent	Onkar Singh	335	1.08%	New
Margin of victory		5,145	16.61%	
Turnout		30,966	64.79%	
Registered electors		50,134		
Independent win (new seat)				
