= Serhada Assembly constituency =

Constituency of the Haryana legislative assembly in India

Coordinates: 29.63°N 76.50°E

- Former constituency for the Haryana Legislative Assembly

Constituency details
- Country: India
- Region: North India
- State: Haryana
- Established: 1967
- Abolished: 1972
- Total electors: 60,232

Serhada Assembly constituency was an assembly constituency in the India state of Haryana.

== Members of the Legislative Assembly ==
Election	Member	Party
1967	P. A. J. Singh	Independent politician
1968	Surjit Singh	Indian National Congress
1972	Surjit Singh	Indian National Congress

== Election results ==
=== Assembly Election 1972 ===
1972 Haryana Legislative Assembly election: Serhada
Party	Candidate	Votes	%	±%
INC	Surjit Singh	18,169	39.67%	▼17.48
Independent	Jagjit Singh Pohlu	16,293	35.57%	New
Independent	Bachna	5,204	11.36%	New
INC(O)	Rattan Singh	2,230	4.87%	New
Independent	Gopi Chand	2,018	4.41%	New
Independent	Gaje Singh	572	1.25%	New
Independent	Sheo Chand Rai	402	0.88%	New
Independent	Mange Ram	306	0.67%	New
Independent	Assa Nand	246	0.54%	New
Margin of victory		1,876	4.10%	▼20.70
Turnout		45,805	77.98%	▲9.99
Registered electors		60,232		▲7.89
INC hold		Swing	▼17.48	

=== Assembly Election 1968 ===
1968 Haryana Legislative Assembly election: Serhada
Party	Candidate	Votes	%	±%
INC	Surjit Singh	21,074	57.15%	▲28.37
SWA	Jagjit Singh Pohlu	11,929	32.35%	▲17.45
VHP	Malkhan Singh	1,576	4.27%	New
Independent	Thandia	1,172	3.18%	New
Independent	Mihan Singh	413	1.12%	New
Independent	Bhalli Ram	339	0.92%	New
Independent	Ajmer Singh	225	0.61%	New
Margin of victory		9,145	24.80%	▲23.71
Turnout		36,878	67.70%	▼7.79
Registered electors		55,827		▲1.93
INC gain from Independent		Swing	▲27.28	

=== Assembly Election 1967 ===
1967 Haryana Legislative Assembly election: Serhada
Party	Candidate	Votes	%	±%
Independent	P. A. J. Singh	12,080	29.86%	New
INC	S. Singh	11,641	28.78%	New
Independent	Rangi	6,264	15.49%	New
SWA	D. Singh	6,026	14.90%	New
Independent	M. Singh	3,452	8.53%	New
Independent	I. Chander	986	2.44%	New
Margin of victory		439	1.09%	
Turnout		40,449	79.54%	
Registered electors		54,771		
Independent win (new seat)				
