= Badopal Assembly constituency =

Constituency of the Haryana legislative assembly in India

Coordinates: 29.36°N 74.08°E

- Former constituency for the Haryana Legislative Assembly

Constituency details
- Country: India
- Region: North India
- State: Haryana
- Established: 1967
- Abolished: 1972
- Total electors: 61,296

Badopal Assembly constituency was an assembly constituency in the India state of Haryana.

== Members of the Legislative Assembly ==
Election	Member	Party
1967	M. Ram	Indian National Congress
1968	Partap Singh	Vishal Haryana Party
1972	Mehar Chand	Indian National Congress

== Election results ==
=== Assembly Election 1972 ===
1972 Haryana Legislative Assembly election: Badopal
Party	Candidate	Votes	%	±%
INC	Mehar Chand	23,490	55.56%	▲10.14
Independent	Pirthi	12,245	28.96%	New
RPI	Sheo Baksh	2,983	7.06%	New
SSP	Harphil Singh	2,075	4.91%	New
Independent	Tek Chand	1,486	3.51%	New
Margin of victory		11,245	26.60%	▲19.30
Turnout		42,279	70.96%	▲8.38
Registered electors		61,296		▲4.21
INC gain from VHP		Swing	▲2.84	

=== Assembly Election 1968 ===
1968 Haryana Legislative Assembly election: Badopal
Party	Candidate	Votes	%	±%
VHP	Partap Singh	18,791	52.72%	New
INC	Raja Ram	16,191	45.42%	▼20.54
Independent	Dalip Singh	439	1.23%	New
Independent	Kalu Ram	223	0.63%	New
Margin of victory		2,600	7.29%	▼36.00
Turnout		35,644	62.28%	▼15.24
Registered electors		58,819		▲8.84
VHP gain from INC		Swing	▼13.24	

=== Assembly Election 1967 ===
1967 Haryana Legislative Assembly election: Badopal
Party	Candidate	Votes	%	±%
INC	M. Ram	27,034	65.96%	New
Independent	C. Lal	9,289	22.66%	New
RPI	S. Bakhsh	3,346	8.16%	New
PSP	R. Swarup	854	2.08%	New
Independent	S. Karan	461	1.12%	New
Margin of victory		17,745	43.30%	
Turnout		40,984	78.11%	
Registered electors		54,040		
INC win (new seat)				
