= Darba Kalan Assembly constituency =

Constituency of the Haryana legislative assembly in India

Coordinates: 29.41°N 75.12°E

- Former constituency for the Haryana Legislative Assembly

Constituency details
- Country: India
- Region: North India
- State: Haryana
- Established: 1977
- Abolished: 2005
- Total electors: 1,39,156

Darba Kalan was an assembly constituency in the Indian state of Haryana.

== Members of the Legislative Assembly ==
Election	Member	Party
1977	Jagdish Kumar	Independent politician
1982	Bahadur Singh	Indian National Congress
1987	Vidya Beniwal	Lokdal
1991	Mani Ram	Janata Party
1996	Vidya Devi	Samata Party
2000	Vidya Devi	Indian National Lok Dal
2005	Bharat Singh	Indian National Congress

== Election results ==
=== Assembly Election 2005 ===
2005 Haryana Legislative Assembly election: Darba Kalan
Party	Candidate	Votes	%	±%
INC	Bharat Singh	61,002	51.47%	▲24.99
INLD	Vidya Beniwal	49,558	41.81%	▼6.82
BJP	Rajvir	3,890	3.28%	New
Independent	Suman	1,513	1.28%	New
BSP	Ram Lal	1,336	1.13%	New
Independent	Akash	637	0.54%	New
Margin of victory		11,444	9.66%	▼12.50
Turnout		1,18,524	85.17%	▲3.69
Registered electors		1,39,156		▲13.86
INC gain from INLD		Swing	▲2.83	

=== Assembly Election 2000 ===
2000 Haryana Legislative Assembly election: Darba Kalan
Party	Candidate	Votes	%	±%
INLD	Vidya Devi	48,438	48.63%	New
INC	Dr. K.V.Singh	26,371	26.48%	▲6.05
HVP	Parhalad Singh	16,697	16.76%	▼21.54
Independent	Pala Singh	7,176	7.21%	New
Margin of victory		22,067	22.16%	▲21.95
Turnout		99,596	81.99%	▼0.08
Registered electors		1,22,221		▲3.92
INLD gain from SAP		Swing	▲10.13	

=== Assembly Election 1996 ===
1996 Haryana Legislative Assembly election: Darba Kalan
Party	Candidate	Votes	%	±%
SAP	Vidya Devi	36,944	38.51%	New
HVP	Prahlad Singh	36,750	38.31%	▲28.06
INC	K.V. Singh	19,602	20.43%	▼18.58
Margin of victory		194	0.20%	▼7.67
Turnout		95,937	84.49%	▲10.16
Registered electors		1,17,609		▲9.44
SAP gain from JP		Swing		

=== Assembly Election 1991 ===
1991 Haryana Legislative Assembly election: Darba Kalan
Party	Candidate	Votes	%	±%
JP	Mani Ram	35,981	46.88%	New
INC	Bharat Singh	29,938	39.01%	▲8.95
HVP	Bhadar Singh	7,864	10.25%	New
BJP	Krishan Lal	1,590	2.07%	New
Independent	Ham Raj	633	0.82%	New
Margin of victory		6,043	7.87%	▼29.76
Turnout		76,746	73.07%	▼7.37
Registered electors		1,07,468		▲9.39
JP gain from LKD		Swing	▼20.81	

=== Assembly Election 1987 ===
1987 Haryana Legislative Assembly election: Darba Kalan
Party	Candidate	Votes	%	±%
LKD	Vidya Beniwal	52,394	67.69%	▲22.65
INC	Bahadar Singh	23,263	30.06%	▼19.16
Independent	Puran Ram	606	0.78%	New
Independent	Bhagat Singh	401	0.52%	New
Margin of victory		29,131	37.64%	▲33.47
Turnout		77,398	79.73%	▲1.38
Registered electors		98,239		▲22.41
LKD gain from INC		Swing	▲18.48	

=== Assembly Election 1982 ===
1982 Haryana Legislative Assembly election: Darba Kalan
Party	Candidate	Votes	%	±%
INC	Bahadur Singh	30,572	49.21%	▲21.75
LKD	Jagdish	27,983	45.05%	New
Independent	Khayali Ram	1,120	1.80%	New
Independent	Krishan	927	1.49%	New
Independent	Indraj	461	0.74%	New
JP	Dhanpat Ram	363	0.58%	▼26.16
Margin of victory		2,589	4.17%	▼5.47
Turnout		62,122	78.70%	▲8.51
Registered electors		80,257		▲14.84
INC gain from Independent		Swing	▲12.12	

=== Assembly Election 1977 ===
1977 Haryana Legislative Assembly election: Darba Kalan
Party	Candidate	Votes	%	±%
Independent	Jagdish Kumar	17,860	37.09%	New
INC	Bahadar Singh	13,221	27.46%	New
JP	Nihal Singh	12,876	26.74%	New
Independent	Satman Chand	3,418	7.10%	New
SUCI(C)	Ajit Singh	772	1.60%	New
Margin of victory		4,639	9.64%	
Turnout		48,147	69.60%	
Registered electors		69,888		
Independent win (new seat)				
