= Babain Assembly constituency =

Constituency of the Haryana legislative assembly in India

Coordinates: 30.07°N 76.98°E

- Former constituency for the Haryana Legislative Assembly

Constituency details
- Country: India
- Region: North India
- State: Haryana
- Established: 1967
- Abolished: 1972
- Total electors: 58,029

Babain Assembly constituency was an assembly constituency in the India state of Haryana.

== Members of the Legislative Assembly ==
Election	Member	Party
1967	Chand Ram	Indian National Congress
1968	Chand Ram	Independent politician
1972	Chand Ram	Independent politician

== Election results ==
=== Assembly Election 1972 ===
1972 Haryana Legislative Assembly election: Babain
Party	Candidate	Votes	%	±%
Independent	Chand Ram	15,728	42.55%	New
INC	Ulsi Ram	15,584	42.16%	▲7.27
Independent	Manga	3,594	9.72%	New
Independent	Nasib Singh	2,060	5.57%	New
Margin of victory		144	0.39%	▼15.82
Turnout		36,966	66.42%	▲13.36
Registered electors		58,029		▲10.29
Independent hold		Swing	▼8.55	

=== Assembly Election 1968 ===
1968 Haryana Legislative Assembly election: Babain
Party	Candidate	Votes	%	±%
Independent	Chand Ram	13,535	51.09%	New
INC	Teka	9,242	34.89%	▼25.88
Independent	Ratia Ram	1,511	5.70%	New
VHP	Rikha Ram	1,067	4.03%	New
Independent	Verindra Kumar	464	1.75%	New
Independent	Bisakhi Ram	411	1.55%	New
Independent	Puran	261	0.99%	New
Margin of victory		4,293	16.21%	▼12.00
Turnout		26,491	51.53%	▼21.88
Registered electors		52,617		▲5.53
Independent gain from INC		Swing	▼9.67	

=== Assembly Election 1967 ===
1967 Haryana Legislative Assembly election: Babain
Party	Candidate	Votes	%	±%
INC	Chand Ram	21,884	60.76%	New
ABJS	R. Dia	11,724	32.55%	New
Independent	J. R. Sarup	2,407	6.68%	New
Margin of victory		10,160	28.21%	
Turnout		36,015	76.31%	
Registered electors		49,862		
INC win (new seat)				
