= Panipat Assembly constituency =

Constituency of the Haryana legislative assembly in India

Coordinates: 29.40°N 76.97°E

- Former constituency for the Haryana Legislative Assembly

Constituency details
- Country: India
- Region: North India
- State: Haryana
- Established: 1967
- Abolished: 2005
- Total electors: 2,00,927

Panipat Assembly constituency was an assembly constituency in the Indian state of Haryana. After delimitation, the Panipat Assembly constituency was split into Panipat Rural (KC Panipat of Panipat Tehsil) and Panipat City (Panipat Municipal Council + OG of Panipat Tehsil)

== Members of the Legislative Assembly ==
Election	Member	Party
1967	Fateh Chand	Bharatiya Jana Sangh
1968	Fateh Chand	Bharatiya Jana Sangh
1972	Hakumat Rai	Indian National Congress
1977	Fateh Chand	Janata Party
1982	Fateh Chand	Bharatiya Janata Party
1987	Balbir Paul	Indian National Congress
1991	Balbir Paul	Indian National Congress
1996	Om Parkash	Independent politician
2000	Balbir Paul	Indian National Congress
2005	Balbir Paul	Indian National Congress

== Election results ==
=== Assembly Election 2005 ===
2005 Haryana Legislative Assembly election: Panipat
Party	Candidate	Votes	%	±%
INC	Balbir Paul	55,828	42.98%	▲1.82
Independent	Om Parkash Jain	42,181	32.47%	New
BJP	Sanjay Bhatia	17,488	13.46%	▼14.25
INLD	Kasturi Lal	7,974	6.14%	New
BSP	Subhash Chand Kabir Panthi	3,051	2.35%	▲1.49
Independent	Balbir	989	0.76%	New
Independent	Parmod	795	0.61%	New
Independent	Om Parkash	558	0.43%	New
Margin of victory		13,647	10.51%	▼2.93
Turnout		1,29,907	64.65%	▲4.26
Registered electors		2,00,927		▲14.77
INC hold		Swing	▲1.82	

=== Assembly Election 2000 ===
2000 Haryana Legislative Assembly election: Panipat
Party	Candidate	Votes	%	±%
INC	Balbir Paul	43,514	41.16%	▲13.97
BJP	Manohar Lal	29,305	27.72%	▲2.42
Independent	Om Prakash Jain	21,393	20.23%	New
Rashtriya Sawarn Dal	Jitender	2,926	2.77%	New
Independent	Darshan Singh	2,038	1.93%	New
Independent	Dharam Pal	1,950	1.84%	New
BSP	Narender	908	0.86%	▼0.61
Independent	Satpal	823	0.78%	New
Independent	Sanjeev	644	0.61%	New
Margin of victory		14,209	13.44%	▼1.76
Turnout		1,05,730	60.41%	▼6.86
Registered electors		1,75,071		▲1.57
INC gain from Independent		Swing	▼1.23	

=== Assembly Election 1996 ===
1996 Haryana Legislative Assembly election: Panipat
Party	Candidate	Votes	%	±%
Independent	Om Parkash	49,123	42.38%	New
INC	Balbir Paul	31,508	27.18%	▼13.07
BJP	Neti Sain	29,321	25.30%	▲4.53
BSP	Partap Singh	1,701	1.47%	New
Independent	Yasim Ali	1,024	0.88%	New
Margin of victory		17,615	15.20%	▲5.07
Turnout		1,15,908	70.02%	▲3.58
Registered electors		1,72,359		▲34.90
Independent gain from INC		Swing	▲2.12	

=== Assembly Election 1991 ===
1991 Haryana Legislative Assembly election: Panipat
Party	Candidate	Votes	%	±%
INC	Balbir Paul	32,745	40.26%	▼1.74
Independent	Om Parkash	24,504	30.13%	New
BJP	Niti Sain	16,894	20.77%	▼3.49
JP	Kasturi Lal	4,672	5.74%	New
HVP	Prem Kumar	714	0.88%	New
Independent	Rattan Lal	435	0.53%	New
Margin of victory		8,241	10.13%	▼4.06
Turnout		81,340	65.37%	▼7.58
Registered electors		1,27,766		▲17.71
INC hold		Swing	▼1.74	

=== Assembly Election 1987 ===
1987 Haryana Legislative Assembly election: Panipat
Party	Candidate	Votes	%	±%
INC	Balbir Paul	32,476	42.00%	▼3.82
Independent	Kasturi Lal	21,502	27.81%	New
BJP	Mohinder Kumar	18,757	24.26%	▼23.20
CPI	Mam Chand	2,500	3.23%	New
Independent	Babu Khan	602	0.78%	New
Margin of victory		10,974	14.19%	▲12.56
Turnout		77,330	72.12%	▲1.24
Registered electors		1,08,543		▲36.23
INC gain from BJP		Swing	▼5.46	

=== Assembly Election 1982 ===
1982 Haryana Legislative Assembly election: Panipat
Party	Candidate	Votes	%	±%
BJP	Fateh Chand	26,467	47.46%	New
INC	Kasturi Lal	25,555	45.82%	▲22.48
Independent	Harish Kumar	1,529	2.74%	New
Independent	Ang Singh Alias Atar Singh	695	1.25%	New
JP	Juginder Pal	686	1.23%	▼68.38
Independent	K. D. Sharma	442	0.79%	New
Margin of victory		912	1.64%	▼44.63
Turnout		55,771	70.79%	▲6.56
Registered electors		79,674		▲21.38
BJP gain from JP		Swing	▼22.16	

=== Assembly Election 1977 ===
1977 Haryana Legislative Assembly election: Panipat
Party	Candidate	Votes	%	±%
JP	Fateh Chand	28,988	69.61%	New
INC	Kasturi Lal	9,721	23.34%	▼35.04
CPI	Ramditta Mal	1,922	4.62%	New
Independent	Bashir Ahmed	804	1.93%	New
Margin of victory		19,267	46.27%	▲25.07
Turnout		41,642	63.93%	▼11.76
Registered electors		65,640		▲4.74
JP gain from INC		Swing	▲11.23	

=== Assembly Election 1972 ===
1972 Haryana Legislative Assembly election: Panipat
Party	Candidate	Votes	%	±%
INC	Hakumat Rai	27,513	58.38%	▲22.09
ABJS	Fateh Chand	17,523	37.18%	▼8.79
CPI(M)	Ram Singh	1,142	2.42%	New
Independent	Gajjan Singh	946	2.01%	New
Margin of victory		9,990	21.20%	▲11.52
Turnout		47,124	76.72%	▲11.97
Registered electors		62,669		▲7.41
INC gain from ABJS		Swing	▲12.41	

=== Assembly Election 1968 ===
1968 Haryana Legislative Assembly election: Panipat
Party	Candidate	Votes	%	±%
ABJS	Fateh Chand	16,957	45.97%	▼3.74
INC	Chaman Lal	13,386	36.29%	▼7.77
BKD	Balbir Singh	5,729	15.53%	New
Independent	Tek Chand	567	1.54%	New
Independent	Kapur Chand	247	0.67%	New
Margin of victory		3,571	9.68%	▲4.03
Turnout		36,886	64.39%	▼11.72
Registered electors		58,343		▲6.23
ABJS hold		Swing	▼3.74	

=== Assembly Election 1967 ===
1967 Haryana Legislative Assembly election: Panipat
Party	Candidate	Votes	%	±%
ABJS	Fateh Chand	20,459	49.71%	New
INC	H. Rai	18,134	44.06%	New
CPI	R. Singh	1,864	4.53%	New
Independent	P. Lal	702	1.71%	New
Margin of victory		2,325	5.65%	
Turnout		41,159	78.35%	
Registered electors		54,919		
ABJS win (new seat)				
