= Jundla Assembly constituency =

Constituency of the Haryana legislative assembly in India

Coordinates: 29.650°N 76.870°E

- Former constituency for the Haryana Legislative Assembly

Constituency details
- Country: India
- Region: North India
- State: Haryana
- Established: 1967
- Abolished: 2005
- Total electors: 1,24,362

Jundla Assembly constituency was an assembly constituency in the India state of Haryana.

== Members of the Legislative Assembly ==
Election	Member	Party
1967	Ram Kishan	Indian National Congress
1968	Banwari Ram	Republican Party of India
1972	Ram Kishan	Indian National Congress
1977	Prem Singh	Janata Party
1982	Sujan Singh	Lokdal
1987	Rishal Singh	Lokdal
1991	Raj Kumar	Indian National Congress
1996	Nafe Singh	Samata Party
2000	Naphe Singh	Indian National Lok Dal
2005	Meena Rani	Indian National Congress

== Election results ==
=== Assembly Election 2005 ===
2005 Haryana Legislative Assembly election: Jundla
Party	Candidate	Votes	%	±%
INC	Meena Rani	31,844	35.97%	▲5.38
INLD	Naphe Singh	29,703	33.55%	▼23.23
BRP	Rishal Singh	15,272	17.25%	New
BJP	Shamsher Singh	6,897	7.79%	New
BSP	Babu Ram	2,463	2.78%	▼1.16
LJP	Anoop Singh	1,809	2.04%	New
NCP	Gian Chand	517	0.58%	New
Margin of victory		2,141	2.42%	▼23.78
Turnout		88,534	71.19%	▲9.27
Registered electors		1,24,362		▲6.99
INC gain from INLD		Swing	▼20.81	

=== Assembly Election 2000 ===
2000 Haryana Legislative Assembly election: Jundla
Party	Candidate	Votes	%	±%
INLD	Naphe Singh	40,868	56.78%	New
INC	Raj Kumar	22,013	30.58%	▲10.59
HVP	Ram Swarup	3,044	4.23%	▼10.96
BSP	Ishwar Kaur	2,839	3.94%	▼4.55
CPI(M)	Surta Ram	1,176	1.63%	New
Independent	Ram Kuwar	906	1.26%	New
Independent	Soran	598	0.83%	New
Margin of victory		18,855	26.20%	▲11.65
Turnout		71,975	61.94%	▼4.36
Registered electors		1,16,236		▼0.43
INLD gain from SAP		Swing	▲22.24	

=== Assembly Election 1996 ===
1996 Haryana Legislative Assembly election: Jundla
Party	Candidate	Votes	%	±%
SAP	Nafe Singh	26,722	34.54%	New
INC	Raj Kumar	15,470	19.99%	▼7.43
HVP	Manphool Singh	11,750	15.19%	New
BSP	Ishwar Kaur	6,575	8.50%	New
Independent	Ram Sharan	6,536	8.45%	New
JD	Jai Parkash	2,871	3.71%	▼11.45
Independent	Gian Chand	1,790	2.31%	New
AIIC(T)	Dhan Singh	1,610	2.08%	New
Independent	Janak Singh	1,194	1.54%	New
Independent	Dropti	883	1.14%	New
Margin of victory		11,252	14.54%	▲10.29
Turnout		77,370	69.37%	▲5.34
Registered electors		1,16,733		▲18.13
SAP gain from INC		Swing	▲7.12	

=== Assembly Election 1991 ===
1991 Haryana Legislative Assembly election: Jundla
Party	Candidate	Votes	%	±%
INC	Raj Kumar	16,511	27.42%	▲10.21
JP	Nafe Singh	13,947	23.16%	New
JD	Jai Parkash	9,129	15.16%	New
Independent	Rosal Singh	5,669	9.41%	New
Independent	Tara Singh	3,503	5.82%	New
Independent	Mamu Ram	3,227	5.36%	New
BJP	Ram Nath	3,202	5.32%	New
Independent	Soran	1,518	2.52%	New
Independent	Balak Ram S/O Matu Ram	1,039	1.73%	New
LKD	Shamsher Singh	785	1.30%	▼76.77
Independent	Harpal	488	0.81%	New
Margin of victory		2,564	4.26%	▼56.60
Turnout		60,215	64.21%	▼3.08
Registered electors		98,814		▲9.51
INC gain from LKD		Swing	▼50.65	

=== Assembly Election 1987 ===
1987 Haryana Legislative Assembly election: Jundla
Party	Candidate	Votes	%	±%
LKD	Rishal Singh	45,096	78.07%	▲43.99
INC	Puran Singh	9,942	17.21%	▼11.74
Independent	Kesho Ram	974	1.69%	New
Independent	Tara Singh	344	0.60%	New
Margin of victory		35,154	60.86%	▲55.73
Turnout		57,763	64.68%	▲7.82
Registered electors		90,233		▲18.15
LKD hold		Swing	▲43.99	

=== Assembly Election 1982 ===
1982 Haryana Legislative Assembly election: Jundla
Party	Candidate	Votes	%	±%
LKD	Sujan Singh	14,627	34.08%	New
INC	Sagar Chand	12,427	28.95%	▲8.88
Independent	Banwari Ram	6,340	14.77%	New
JP	Jogi Ram	3,235	7.54%	▼38.04
Independent	Rattan Singh	2,155	5.02%	New
Independent	Jhalu	1,235	2.88%	New
Independent	Ajit Singh	1,228	2.86%	New
Independent	Surta	603	1.40%	New
Independent	Sardha Ram	533	1.24%	New
Independent	Sardha Ram	301	0.70%	New
Margin of victory		2,200	5.13%	▼6.56
Turnout		42,919	57.05%	▲5.42
Registered electors		76,372		▲18.48
LKD gain from JP		Swing	▼11.50	

=== Assembly Election 1977 ===
1977 Haryana Legislative Assembly election: Jundla
Party	Candidate	Votes	%	±%
JP	Prem Singh	14,919	45.58%	New
Independent	Banwari Ram	11,093	33.89%	New
INC	Sheela Devi	6,569	20.07%	▼23.30
Margin of victory		3,826	11.69%	▲9.51
Turnout		32,730	51.44%	▼8.04
Registered electors		64,460		▲12.11
JP gain from INC		Swing		

=== Assembly Election 1972 ===
1972 Haryana Legislative Assembly election: Jundla
Party	Candidate	Votes	%	±%
INC	Ram Kishan	14,665	43.37%	▲2.50
Independent	Banwari Ram	13,927	41.18%	New
INC(O)	Jogi Ram	2,931	8.67%	New
Independent	Chattar Singh	1,011	2.99%	New
Independent	Satnam Singh	888	2.63%	New
ABJS	Om Prakash	394	1.17%	New
Margin of victory		738	2.18%	▼11.69
Turnout		33,816	61.08%	▲8.19
Registered electors		57,498		▲11.77
INC gain from RPI		Swing	▼11.37	

=== Assembly Election 1968 ===
1968 Haryana Legislative Assembly election: Jundla
Party	Candidate	Votes	%	±%
RPI	Banwari Ram	14,253	54.74%	▲20.52
INC	Ram Kishan	10,642	40.87%	▲6.18
Independent	Faqir Chand	661	2.54%	New
Independent	Raja Ram	483	1.85%	New
Margin of victory		3,611	13.87%	▲13.40
Turnout		26,039	51.94%	▼11.71
Registered electors		51,441		▲2.58
RPI gain from INC		Swing	▲20.05	

=== Assembly Election 1967 ===
1967 Haryana Legislative Assembly election: Jundla
Party	Candidate	Votes	%	±%
INC	Ram Kishan	10,843	34.69%	New
RPI	B. Ram	10,696	34.22%	New
Independent	P. Singh	4,510	14.43%	New
Independent	J. Ram	2,844	9.10%	New
Independent	Munshi	1,151	3.68%	New
Independent	P. Ram	955	3.06%	New
Independent	S. Ram	256	0.82%	New
Margin of victory		147	0.47%	
Turnout		31,255	66.56%	
Registered electors		50,145		
INC win (new seat)				
