= 1977 Haryana Legislative Assembly election =

Legislative Assembly election in Haryana, India

- 6 October 1977

All 90 seats in the Haryana Legislative Assembly 46 seats needed for a majority
- Turnout: 64.46% (▼6%)
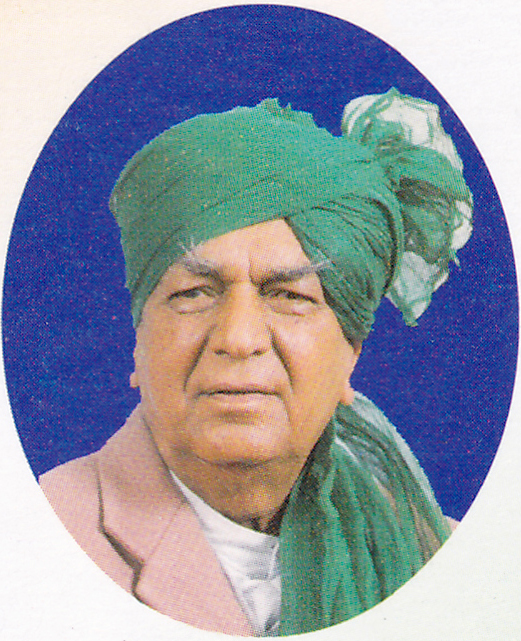

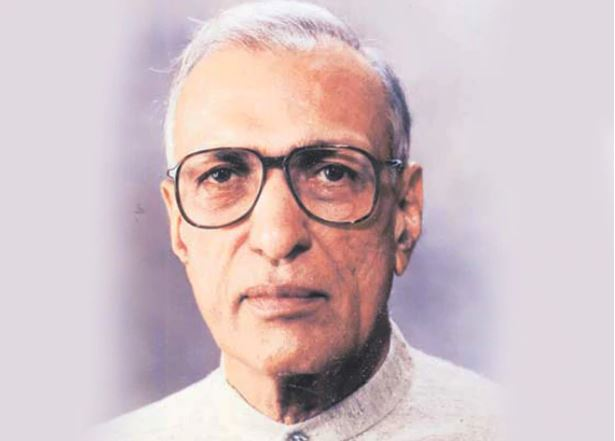
	Majority party	Minority party
Leader	Devi Lal	Bansi Lal
Party	JP	INC(R)
Last election	New	52
Seats won	75	3
Seat change	New	▼49
Popular vote	1,765,566	648,422
Percentage	46.70%	17.15%
Swing	New	▼29.76%
Chief Minister before election
Devi Lal
JP
Elected Chief Minister
Devi Lal
JP

Elections to the Haryana Legislative Assembly were held in 1977 to elect members of the 90 constituencies in Haryana, India. The Janata Party won the popular vote and 75 of the 90 seats and Devi Lal was appointed as the Chief Minister of Haryana. The number of constituencies was set as 90, on the recommendation of the Delimitation Commission of India.

== Results ==
Party	Votes	%	Seats
Janata Party	1,765,566	46.70	75
Indian National Congress	648,422	17.15	3
Vishal Haryana Party	225,478	5.96	5
Communist Party of India	29,196	0.77	0
Communist Party of India (Marxist)	23,191	0.61	0
Socialist Unity Center of India	2,916	0.08	0
Republican Party of India	2,058	0.05	0
Republican Party of India (Khobragade)	1,150	0.03	0
Independents	1,082,982	28.64	7
Total	3,780,959	100.00	90
Valid votes	3,780,959	98.77	
Invalid/blank votes	47,101	1.23	
Total votes	3,828,060	100.00	
Registered voters/turnout	5,938,821	64.46	
Source: ECI:

== Elected members ==
Constituency			Winner				Runner Up				Margin	%
#	Name	Poll %	Candidate	Party	Votes	%	Candidate	Party	Votes	%	Margin	%
1	Kalka	69.19%	Lachhman Singh	JP	31,915	70.28	Kishori Lal	IND	12,338	27.17	19,577	43.11
2	Naraingarh	68.70%	Lal Singh	JP	20,909	50.28	Jagjit Singh	INC	12,482	30.02	8,427	20.26
3	Sadhaura (SC)	69.25%	Bhag Mal	JP	23,989	52.34	Prabhu Ram	INC	16,352	35.68	7,637	16.66
4	Chhachhrauli	75.70%	Kanhaiyalal	INC	16,603	37.63	Ram Jatan	IND	12,371	28.04	4,232	9.59
5	Yamunanagar	65.46%	Kamla Devi	JP	28,596	64.15	Girish Chandra	INC	9,953	22.33	18,643	41.82
6	Jagadhri	71.71%	Brij Mohan	JP	24,091	55.66	Om Prakash	INC	17,902	41.36	6,189	14.30
7	Mullana (SC)	67.65%	Sher Singh	JP	22,351	53.36	Phool Chand	INC	16,472	39.33	5,879	14.03
8	Ambala Cant.	67.82%	Shushma Swaraj	JP	19,639	63.45	Dev. Raj Anand	INC	9,815	31.71	9,824	31.74
9	Ambala City	63.53%	Shiv Prashad	JP	28,237	75.99	Lekh Wati Jain	INC	8,279	22.28	19,958	53.71
10	Naggal	72.78%	Sumer Chand	JP	22,522	52.39	Har Mohinder Singh	INC	19,253	44.79	3,269	7.60
11	Indri	71.59%	Des Raj	JP	30,386	67.52	Surjit Singh	INC	13,493	29.98	16,893	37.54
12	Nilokheri	70.58%	Shiv Ram	JP	16,953	40.82	Daljit Singh	IND	7,757	18.68	9,196	22.14
13	Karnal	62.20%	Ram Lal	JP	25,236	65.55	Ram Sarup	INC	7,303	18.97	17,933	46.58
14	Jundla (SC)	51.44%	Prem Singh	JP	14,919	45.58	Banwari Ram	IND	11,093	33.89	3,826	11.69
15	Gharaunda	64.82%	Ram Pal Singh	JP	17,949	43.50	Om Parkash	IND	6,997	16.96	10,952	26.54
16	Assandh (SC)	49.53%	Jogi Ram	JP	22,537	72.65	Karam Chand	INC	3,953	12.74	18,584	59.91
17	Panipat	63.93%	Fateh Chand	JP	28,988	69.61	Kasturi Lal	INC	9,721	23.34	19,267	46.27
18	Samalkha	66.63%	Mool Chand	JP	16,273	37.70	Hari Singh	INC	8,027	18.59	8,246	19.11
19	Naultha	66.57%	Satbir	JP	22,023	54.94	Mansa Ram	INC	8,662	21.61	13,361	33.33
20	Shahabad	67.07%	Surinder Singh	JP	20,327	51.12	Amir Chand	INC	7,182	18.06	13,145	33.06
21	Radaur (SC)	68.30%	Lehri Singh	JP	19,868	52.07	Ram Singh	IND	8,728	22.88	11,140	29.19
22	Thanesar	70.52%	Devinder Sharma	JP	28,044	69.19	Om Prakash	INC	12,126	29.92	15,918	39.27
23	Pehowa	67.80%	Tara Singh	JP	16,992	39.40	Piara Singh	INC	7,904	18.33	9,088	21.07
24	Guhla (SC)	57.38%	Ishwar	JP	20,824	57.94	Sant Ram	IND	5,057	14.07	15,767	43.87
25	Kaithal	71.01%	Raghunath	JP	20,846	52.46	Om Prabha Jain	IND	16,901	42.53	3,945	9.93
26	Pundri	67.11%	Agnivesh	JP	24,256	58.85	Antram	INC	7,546	18.31	16,710	40.54
27	Pai	64.50%	Jagjit Singh Pohlu	VHP	17,997	45.86	Kushal Pal Singh	JP	13,827	35.24	4,170	10.62
28	Hassangarh	60.26%	Sant Kumar	JP	19,191	50.69	Sheonath	VHP	11,429	30.19	7,762	20.50
29	Kiloi	61.33%	Hari Chand	JP	19,357	54.72	Ranbir Singh	INC	10,530	29.77	8,827	24.95
30	Rohtak	65.96%	Mangal Sein	JP	33,650	67.20	Sri Kishan Das	INC	16,109	32.17	17,541	35.03
31	Meham	64.50%	Har Sarup	JP	21,509	49.20	Wazir Singh	IND	7,524	17.21	13,985	31.99
32	Kalanaur (SC)	57.20%	Jai Narain	JP	23,213	69.80	Kartar Devi	INC	7,079	21.29	16,134	48.51
33	Beri	66.12%	Ran Singh	JP	22,228	53.30	Dalip Singh	IND	18,244	43.75	3,984	9.55
34	Salhawas	56.95%	Ram Narain	JP	20,982	57.74	Raj Singh	IND	6,145	16.91	14,837	40.83
35	Jhajjar (SC)	53.36%	Mange Ram	JP	18,001	49.05	Banarsi Das	VHP	8,057	21.95	9,944	27.10
36	Badli	59.43%	Hardwari Lal	IND	12,715	34.88	Ude Singh	JP	12,328	33.82	387	1.06
37	Bahadurgarh	60.52%	Mehar Singh	JP	21,732	48.59	Mange Ram	IND	11,878	26.56	9,854	22.03
38	Baroda (SC)	60.41%	Bhalle Ram	JP	14,705	36.22	Darya Singh	IND	10,672	26.29	4,033	9.93
39	Gohana	65.66%	Ganga Ram	IND	18,649	38.47	Ram Dhari	JP	17,337	35.76	1,312	2.71
40	Kailana	66.65%	Shanti Devi	JP	19,299	43.87	Rajinder Singh	VHP	14,449	32.85	4,850	11.02
41	Sonepat	63.71%	Devi Dass	JP	26,456	60.44	Chiranji Lal	INC	12,722	29.06	13,734	31.38
42	Rai	64.40%	Rizaqram	JP	21,186	49.89	Jaswant Singh	INC	16,258	38.28	4,928	11.61
43	Rohat	61.92%	Om Prakash	JP	23,396	57.66	Nawal Singh	INC	6,897	17.00	16,499	40.66
44	Kalayat (SC)	52.54%	Prit Singh	JP	12,953	42.68	Maru	IND	5,494	18.10	7,459	24.58
45	Narwana	71.46%	Shamsher Singh	INC	9,078	22.05	Tek Chand	IND	8,242	20.02	836	2.03
46	Uchana Kalan	71.55%	Birender Singh	INC	12,120	26.31	Ranbir Singh	JP	10,488	22.77	1,632	3.54
47	Rajond	66.51%	Gulzar Singh	JP	15,353	40.01	Parsanni Devi	INC	5,968	15.55	9,385	24.46
48	Jind	70.31%	Mange Ram	IND	15,751	36.95	Pratap Singh	JP	9,646	22.63	6,105	14.32
49	Julana	70.92%	Zile Singh	JP	16,407	39.09	Ghasi Ram	IND	9,414	22.43	6,993	16.66
50	Safidon	67.52%	Ram Krishan	JP	18,930	43.34	Pratap Singh	INC	7,192	16.47	11,738	26.87
51	Faridabad	56.03%	Deep Chand Bhatia	JP	18,671	42.77	Aikagar Chand Ch.	INC	12,680	29.05	5,991	13.72
52	Mewla Maharajpur	59.67%	Gajraj Nagar	JP	13,846	34.86	Mohinder Pratap	IND	13,074	32.92	772	1.94
53	Ballabgarh	69.02%	Rajinder Singh	IND	22,597	46.26	Sharda Rani	INC	16,209	33.18	6,388	13.08
54	Palwal	69.03%	Mool Chand	JP	24,127	50.74	Kalyan Singh	INC	14,112	29.68	10,015	21.06
55	Hassanpur (SC)	58.00%	Gaya Lal	JP	25,163	63.66	Chhotey Lal	IND	7,785	19.70	17,378	43.96
56	Hathin	65.85%	Aditya Vesh	JP	15,182	35.28	Chhutmal	IND	5,665	13.16	9,517	22.12
57	Ferozepur Jhirka	62.57%	Shakrulla	IND	9,682	22.54	Yakub Khan	IND	7,236	16.85	2,446	5.69
58	Nuh	56.86%	Sardar Khan	JP	15,457	44.07	Din Mohd.	IND	13,699	39.06	1,758	5.01
59	Taoru	69.28%	Khurshed Ahmed	JP	27,167	57.25	Tayyub Hussain	INC	10,913	23.00	16,254	34.25
60	Sohna	64.37%	Vijay Pal Singh	JP	17,516	38.63	Mahabir Singh	IND	13,033	28.75	4,483	9.88
61	Gurgaon	61.29%	Pratap Singh Thakran	JP	15,543	38.90	Ram Chander	IND	11,327	28.35	4,216	10.55
62	Pataudi (SC)	56.40%	Narain Singh	VHP	17,232	44.21	Ram Singh	JP	16,528	42.41	704	1.80
63	Badhra	64.25%	Ran Singh	JP	17,423	40.11	Attar Singh	IND	15,621	35.97	1,802	4.14
64	Dadri	61.87%	Hukam Singh	JP	14,449	35.13	Ganpat Rai	IND	9,349	22.73	5,100	12.40
65	Mundhal Khurd	67.07%	Tek Ram	JP	20,302	48.90	Devi Parsan	INC	7,703	18.55	12,599	30.35
66	Bhiwani	64.69%	Bir Singh	JP	17,923	38.80	Sagar Ram	IND	15,092	32.68	2,831	6.12
67	Tosham	70.61%	Sunder Singh	IND	23,814	49.02	Jangbir Singh	IND	21,640	44.55	2,174	4.47
68	Loharu	57.92%	Hira Nand	JP	29,659	73.30	Shri Ram	INC	6,076	15.02	23,583	58.28
69	Bawani Khera (SC)	52.68%	Jagan Nath	JP	26,925	76.25	Amar Singh	INC	6,919	19.59	20,006	56.66
70	Barwala	68.77%	Jai Narain	JP	16,857	36.71	Thandi Ram	IND	9,158	19.94	7,699	16.77
71	Narnaund	68.57%	Virender Singh	JP	25,481	58.54	Saroop Singh	INC	9,763	22.43	15,718	36.11
72	Hansi	70.25%	Baldev Tayal	JP	22,732	48.82	Amir Chand	IND	13,539	29.08	9,193	19.74
73	Bhattu Kalan	68.90%	Devi Lal	JP	27,491	65.52	Prithvi Singh	CPM	13,731	32.72	13,760	32.80
74	Hissar	62.34%	Balwant Rai Tayal	JP	22,397	57.93	Om Parkash	IND	15,065	38.97	7,332	18.96
75	Ghirai	64.99%	Kanwal Singh	JP	18,991	43.21	Suresh Chander	IND	9,571	21.78	9,420	21.43
76	Tohana	60.20%	Karam Singh	JP	23,709	59.46	Bhim Singh	INC	13,390	33.58	10,319	25.88
77	Ratia (SC)	54.92%	Peer Chand	JP	12,197	36.80	Sheopal	INC	9,246	27.89	2,951	8.91
78	Fatehabad	68.96%	Harphul Singh	JP	13,863	28.59	Lila Krishan	IND	13,726	28.31	137	0.28
79	Adampur	72.21%	Bhajan Lal	JP	33,193	67.89	Mohar Singh	IND	12,390	25.34	20,803	42.55
80	Darba Kalan	69.60%	Jagdish Kumar	IND	17,860	37.09	Bahadar Singh	INC	13,221	27.46	4,639	9.63
81	Ellenabad (SC)	62.35%	Bhagi Ram	JP	21,769	51.38	Mani Ram	IND	14,365	33.91	7,404	17.47
82	Sirsa	66.56%	Shankar Lal	JP	14,276	31.31	Lachhman Das	IND	9,870	21.65	4,406	9.66
83	Rori	66.91%	Sukhdev Singh	JP	13,368	30.07	Jagdish Nehra	INC	10,962	24.66	2,406	5.41
84	Dabwali (SC)	59.05%	Mani Ram	JP	21,017	51.17	Govardhan Chauhan	INC	13,032	31.73	7,985	19.44
85	Bawal (SC)	57.99%	Shakuntala	JP	20,637	46.46	Mohan Lal	VHP	17,128	38.56	3,509	7.90
86	Rewari	63.69%	Ram Singh	JP	19,563	44.41	Shiv Rattan Singh	VHP	19,477	44.22	86	0.19
87	Jatusana	62.34%	Inderjeet Singh	VHP	19,799	39.53	Raj Singh	JP	14,500	28.95	5,299	10.58
88	Mahendragarh	68.90%	Dali Singh	VHP	25,091	48.17	Ram Bilas	JP	22,933	44.02	2,158	4.15
89	Ateli	68.22%	Birender Singh	VHP	29,552	56.83	Laxman Singh	JP	17,053	32.79	12,499	24.04
90	Narnaul	63.27%	Ayodhya Prashad	JP	20,784	44.97	Attar Singh	VHP	9,375	20.29	11,409	24.68

== See also ==
- List of constituencies of the Haryana Legislative Assembly
- 1977 elections in India
