= Lachhman Singh =

Indian politician (1922–2006)

Member of Parliament, Rajya Sabha
- In office 1996–2002
- Constituency: Haryana

Personal details
- Born: 10 January 1922 Karanpur village, Panchkula district, Punjab, British India (now Haryana, India)
- Died: 21 February 2006 (aged 84)
- Party: Indian National Congress

Lachhman Singh (10 January 1922 – 21 February 2006) was an Indian politician who was a Member of Parliament, representing Haryana in the Rajya Sabha the upper house of India's Parliament. He was a member of the Indian National Congress.

Singh died on 21 February 2006, at the age of 84.
