= Mangal Sein =

Indian politician

Mangal Sein (1927–1990) was a leader of Bharatiya Janata Party from Haryana and the deputy chief minister of Haryana from 1977 to 1979. He was elected to Haryana Legislative Assembly from Rohtak seven times. He served as President of state unit of BJP a later configuration of Jan Sangh.
