= Vishal Haryana Party =

Political party in Haryana, India

The Vishal Haryana Party (translation: Greater Haryana Party) was a political party in the Indian state of Haryana, led by Rao Birender Singh.

The party was formed in an effort to bring culturally similar groups in the region together, but recognized a need to gain financial stability in order to maintain the Haryana state. It was first regional party of Haryana and successfully made its own Chief minister only after six months of formation of Haryana state in 1967. Initially, the party included only twenty-nine members, formed from non-Jan Sanghis present in the legislature at the time.

In the 1971 elections, the party released a manifesto that castigated the Congress Party for its 'semi-authoritarian' governance of the region, as well as promoting their own support for farmers. The success of the party in the 1971 elections was attributed to Singh's personality; however, those same results appeared to show that their emphasis on local political issues detracted from further success.

It merged with Congress (I) on 23 September 1978. It officially lost its status as a registered political party as of 23 July 1981.

== Electoral performance ==
=== General election results ===
| Year | Legislature | Seats won | Change in seats | Overall votes | Percentage of votes |
|---|---|---|---|---|---|
| 1971 | 5th Lok Sabha | 1 / 518 | New | 352,514 | 0.24% |
| 1977 | 6th Lok Sabha | 0 / 544 | ▼1 | 192,867 | 0.10% |

=== Vidhan Sabha results ===
| Year | Legislature | Seats won | Change in seats | Overall votes | Percentage of votes |
|---|---|---|---|---|---|
| 1968 mid-terms | 4th Vidhan Sabha | 69 / 70 | New | 106,373 | 46.10% |
| 1972 general | 5th Vidhan Sabha | 2 / 7 | ▼4 | 121,311 | 43.67% |
| 1977 general | 6th Vidhan Sabha | 3 / 6 | ▲1 | 120,422 | 41.69% |

=== Haryana Legislative assembly elections ===
| Year | Seats won | Change in seats | Overall votes | Percentage of votes | Ref. |
|---|---|---|---|---|---|
| 1968 | 16 / 81 | New | 377,744 | 14.86% | |
| 1972 | 3 / 81 | ▼13 | 242,444 | 6.94% | |
| 1977 | 5 / 90 | ▲2 | 225,478 | 5.96% | |
