= 2024 Haryana Legislative Assembly election =

Assembly elections in Haryana

- 5 October 2024

All 90 seats in the Haryana Legislative Assembly 46 seats needed for a majority
- Opinion polls
- Turnout: 67.99% (▼0.21 pp)
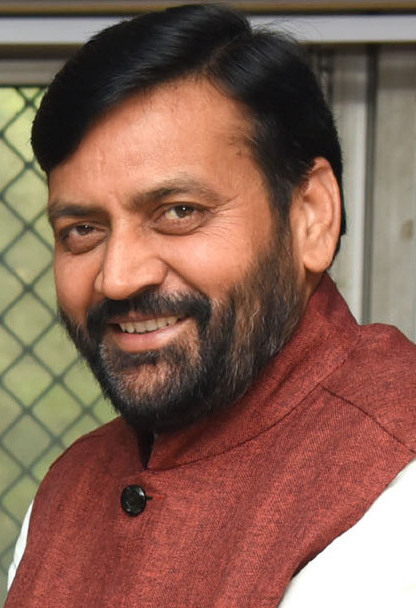

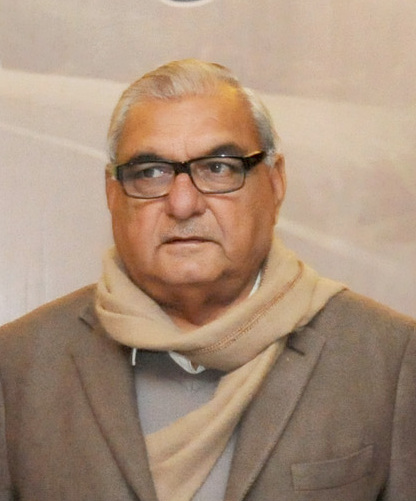

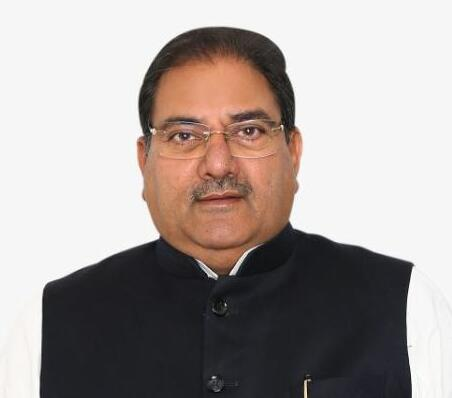

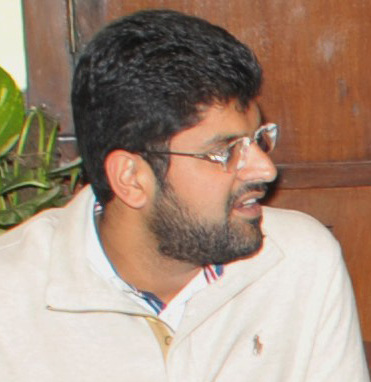
	Majority party	Minority party
Leader	Nayab Singh Saini	Bhupinder Singh Hooda
Party	BJP	INC
Alliance	NDA	INDIA
Leader since	2024	2000
Leader's seat	Ladwa	Garhi Sampla-Kiloi
Last election	36.49%, 40 seats	28.08%, 31 seats
Seats won	48	37
Seat change	▲8	▲6
Popular vote	55,48,800	54,30,602
Percentage	39.94%	39.09%
Swing	▲3.45 pp	▲11.01 pp
	Third party	Fourth party
Leader	Abhay Singh Chautala	Dushyant Chautala
Party	INLD	JJP
Alliance	INLD+	JJP+
Leader since	2014	2018
Leader's seat	Ellenabad (lost)	Uchana Kalan (lost)
Last election	2.44%, 1 seats	14.8%, 10 seats
Seats won	2	0
Seat change	▲1	▼10
Popular vote	5,75,192	1,25,022
Percentage	4.14%	0.90%
Swing	▲1.70 pp	▼13.90 pp
- Seatwise Result Map of the election

- Structure of the Haryana Legislative Assembly after the election
Chief Minister before election
Nayab Singh Saini
BJP
Chief Minister after election
Nayab Singh Saini
BJP

2024 Haryana Legislative Assembly election was held on 5 October 2024 to elect all 90 members of the Haryana Legislative Assembly.

The schedule of the election was announced by the Election Commission of India on 16 August 2024. The ballots were counted and the results were declared on 8 October 2024. The Bharatiya Janata Party won a majority with 48 seats and secured victory for the third consecutive time, becoming the first party in the state's history to achieve this feat. The BJP outperformed expectations and defied almost every pollster, which had predicted a sweeping win for the opposition Congress. Although the popular vote total differed by less than one percentage point, the Congress managed to win only 37 seats.

A post poll survey conducted by CDS- Lokniti revealed that BJP won a majority of the Other Backward Caste (OBC) votes along with the votes of Upper Caste and Non- Jatav Scheduled Caste. The Congress due to its emphasis on Jat voters, won a massive amount of Jat vote, which constitues 25% of the population, though it was significantly lower than pollster predicted, as well as that of religious minorities, but trailed in other sections of the society. The Congress also narrowly led the BJP in younger voters while the BJP

In terms of education, Congress had the strongest support of non- literate voters where it led the BJP, though its vote share plummeted with increase in educational qualification. Meanwhile, the BJP performed best in those being graduates or above. BJP won massively over urban voters, beating Congress by 16 points. However, it won led narrowly in semi-urban voters and trailed the Congress by 4 points in rural voters. The relatively high urban turnout compared to the general election, held 4 months back enabled the BJP to win more seats than expected and win the election.

== Background ==
The tenure of the 14th Haryana Assembly was slated to end on 3 November 2024. The previous Assembly elections were held in October 2019, in which the Bharatiya Janata Party emerged as the single largest party. After the election, the BJP formed a coalition government with the Jannayak Janta Party (JJP) with Manohar Lal Khattar becoming the Chief Minister and Dushyant Chautala as his deputy.

On 12 March 2024, Khattar resigned as the Chief Minister after the coalition between the BJP and JJP came to an end. Nayab Singh Saini of the BJP was sworn in as the new Chief Minister on the same day with the support of independents. After three independents withdrew their support to the BJP government in May 2024, Saini led a minority government.

In the 2024 Lok Sabha elections held earlier in the year, the BJP which had held all the seats following the 2019, retained five seats while the Indian National Congress won the remaining five seats.

== Schedule ==
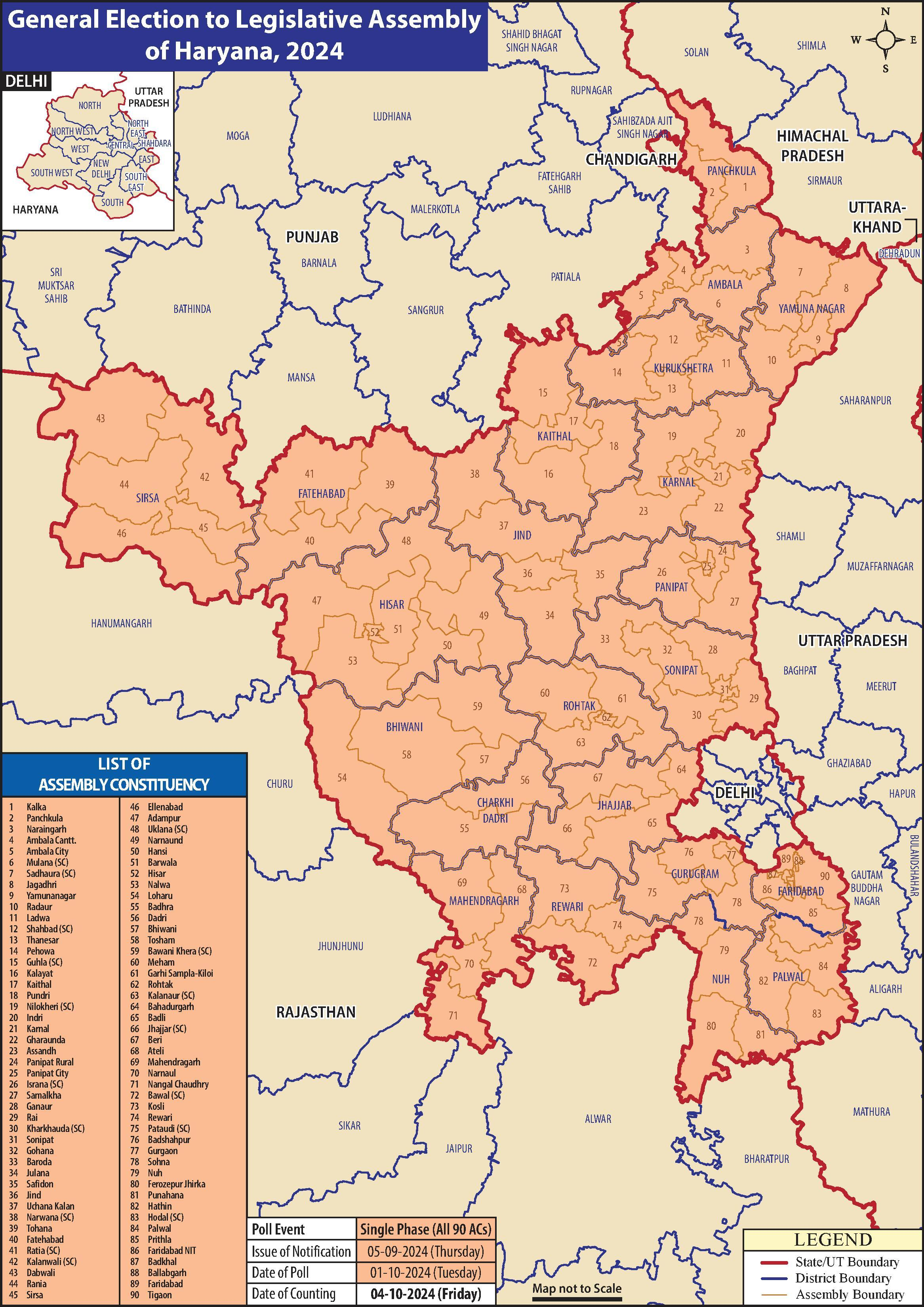
Single phase schedule of 2024 Haryana Legislative Assembly election

The schedule of the election was announced by the Election Commission of India on 16 August 2024. The election was scheduled to be held in a single phase on 1 October. On 31 August, the Election Commission announced that the elections would be held on 5 October and that the votes would be counted on 8 October.

Poll event	Schedule
Notification	5 September 2024
Last day for filing nominations	12 September 2024
Scrutiny of nominations	13 September 2024
Last day for withdrawal of nominations	16 September 2024
Polling	5 October 2024
Counting of votes	8 October 2024

== Parties and alliances ==
The BJP contested in 89 seats. On 12 September, the Congress announced an alliance with the Communist Party of India (Marxist). In July 2024, the Indian National Lok Dal (INLD) and Bahujan Samaj Party (BSP) announced an alliance for the assembly elections, with Abhay Singh Chautala as the chief ministerial face. In August 2024, the JJP announced an alliance with the Azad Samaj Party (Kanshi Ram) (ASP) for the elections.

Alliances
Alliance	Party	Symbol	Leader	Seats contested	
NDA	Bharatiya Janata Party		Nayab Singh Saini	89	
INC+CPIM Alliance	Indian National Congress		Bhupinder Singh Hooda	89	90
INC+CPIM Alliance	Communist Party of India (Marxist)		Surendra Singh Malik	1	90
INLD-BSP Alliance	Indian National Lok Dal		Abhay Singh Chautala	51	86
INLD-BSP Alliance	Bahujan Samaj Party		Rajbir Sorkhi	35	86
JJP-ASP Alliance	Jannayak Janata Party		Dushyant Chautala	66	78
JJP-ASP Alliance	Azad Samaj Party		Chandrashekhar Azad	12	78
Others	Aam Aadmi Party		Sushil Gupta	88	
Others	Haryana Lokhit Party		Gopal Kanda	4	
Others	Communist Party of India		Dariyav Singh Kashyap	2	
Others	Nationalist Congress Party (Sharadchandra Pawar)		Virender Verma	1	
Others	Nationalist Congress Party		Ranbir	1	

== Candidates ==
- The BJP released its first list of 67 candidates on 4 September followed by the second list of 21 candidates on 10 September and the third list of 3 candidates on 11 September.
- The Congress released its first list of 32 candidates on 6 September and the second list of nine candidates on 8 September. The party released its third list of 40 candidates on 11 September and the candidates for eight seats on 12 September.
- The BSP released its first list of four candidates on 27 August. The INLD released its first list of seven candidates on 1 September.
- The JJP-ASP alliance released its first list of 19 candidates on 4 September followed by a second list of 12 candidates on 9 September. The alliance announced candidates for 34 more seats on 11 September. The final lists of candidates contesting in 21 seats were released in three phases on 12 September.

Candidates of major alliances
District	Constituency		NDA		INDIA		INLD+		JJP+	
Panchkula	1	Kalka	BJP	Shakti Rani Sharma	INC	Pardeep Chaudhary	BSP	Charan Singh		
Panchkula	2	Panchkula	BJP	Gian Chand Gupta	INC	Chander Mohan	INLD	Kshitij Chaudhary	JJP	Sushil Garg
Ambala	3	Naraingarh	BJP	Pawan Saini	INC	Shalley Chaudhary	BSP	Harbilas Singh		
Ambala	4	Ambala Cant.	BJP	Anil Vij	INC	Parimal Pari	INLD	Onkar Singh	JJP	Avtar Kardhan
Ambala	5	Ambala City	BJP	Aseem Goel	INC	Nirmal Singh	BSP	Malkit Singh	ASP(KR)	Parul Nagpal
Ambala	6	Mulana (SC)	BJP	Santosh Sarwan	INC	Pooja Chaudhary	INLD	Parkash Bharti	JJP	Ravindra Dheen
Yamunanagar	7	Sadhaura (SC)	BJP	Balwant Singh	INC	Renu Bala	BSP	Brij Pal	ASP(KR)	Sohail
Yamunanagar	8	Jagadhri	BJP	Kanwar Pal Gujjar	INC	Akram Khan	BSP	Darshan Lal Kheda	ASP(KR)	Ashok Kashyap
Yamunanagar	9	Yamunanagar	BJP	Ghanshyam Dass	INC	Raman Tyagi	INLD	Dilbag Singh	JJP	Intezaar Ali Gurjar
Yamunanagar	10	Radaur	BJP	Shyam Singh Rana	INC	Bishan Lal Saini	BSP	Dharampal Tigga	ASP(KR)	Mandeep Topra
Kurukshetra	11	Ladwa	BJP	Nayab Singh Saini	INC	Mewa Singh	INLD	Sapna Barshami	JJP	Vinod Sharma
Kurukshetra	12	Shahbad (SC)	BJP	Subhash Kalsana	INC	Ram Karan	BSP	Chander Bhan	JJP	Rajita Singh
Kurukshetra	13	Thanesar	BJP	Subhash Sudha	INC	Ashok Kumar Arora	BSP	Tanuja	JJP	Surya Pratap Singh Rathod
Kurukshetra	14	Pehowa	BJP	Jai Bhagwan Sharma	INC	Mandeep Singh Chatha	INLD	Baldev Singh Warraich	JJP	Dr Sukhvinder Kaur
Kaithal	15	Guhla (SC)	BJP	Kulwant Ram Bazigar	INC	Devinder Hans	INLD	Poonam Sultaniya	JJP	Krishna Bazigar
Kaithal	16	Kalayat	BJP	Kamlesh Dhanda	INC	Vikas Saharan	INLD	Rampal Majra	JJP	Pritam Mehra Kolekhan
Kaithal	17	Kaithal	BJP	Leela Ram	INC	Aditya Surjewala	BSP	Anil Kumar	JJP	Sandeep Garhi
Kaithal	18	Pundri	BJP	Satpal Jamba	INC	Sultan Singh Jadola	BSP	Hisam Singh	(Note: JJP-ASP alliance extended support to independent candidate Sajjan Dhul in Pundri.)	
Karnal	19	Nilokheri (SC)	BJP	Bhagwan Das	INC	Dharam Pal Gonder	INLD	Balwan Balmiki	ASP(KR)	Karn Singh Bhukkal
Karnal	20	Indri	BJP	Ram Kumar Kashyap	INC	Rakesh Kumar Kamboj	BSP	Surender Kumar	JJP	Kuldeep Mandhan
Karnal	21	Karnal	BJP	Jagmohan Anand	INC	Sumita Virk	INLD	Surjeet Singh Pehalwan	JJP	Jitendra Rayal
Karnal	22	Gharaunda	BJP	Harvinder Kalyan	INC	Virender Singh Rathore	INLD	Mannu Kashyap	JJP	Rajpal
Karnal	23	Assandh	BJP	Yogender Singh Rana	INC	Shamsher Singh Gogi	BSP	Gopal Singh Rana		
Panipat	24	Panipat Rural	BJP	Mahipal Dhanda	INC	Sachin Kundu	BSP	Ranbir Singh	JJP	Raghunath Kashyap
Panipat	25	Panipat City	BJP	Parmod Kumar Vij	INC	Varinder Kumar Shah	BSP	Saroj Bala		
Panipat	26	Israna (SC)	BJP	Krishan Lal Panwar	INC	Balbir Singh	INLD	Suraj Bhan Nara	JJP	Sunil Saudapur
Panipat	27	Samalkha	BJP	Manmohan Bhadana	INC	Dharam Singh Chhoker	INLD	Rajesh Jhattipur	JJP	Gangaram Swami
Sonipat	28	Ganaur	BJP	Devender Kaushik	INC	Kuldeep Sharma	BSP	Nar Singh	JJP	Anil Tyagi
Sonipat	29	Rai	BJP	Krishna Gahlawat	INC	Jai Bhagwan Antil	INLD	Pramod Dahiya	JJP	Bijender Antil Murthal
Sonipat	30	Kharkhauda (SC)	BJP	Pawan Kharkhauda	INC	Jaiveer Singh	INLD	Pritam Khokhar	JJP	Ramesh Khatak
Sonipat	31	Sonipat	BJP	Nikhil Madan	INC	Surender Panwar	INLD	Shradha Ram	ASP(KR)	Rajesh
Sonipat	32	Gohana	BJP	Arvind Sharma	INC	Jagbir Singh Malik	BSP	Dinesh Kumar	JJP	Kuldeep Malik
Sonipat	33	Baroda	BJP	Pradeep Sangwan	INC	Indu Raj Narwal	BSP	Dharambir Singh	JJP	Deepak Malik
Jind	34	Julana	BJP	Captain Yogesh Bairagi	INC	Vinesh Phogat	INLD	Surender Lathar	JJP	Amarjeet Dhanda
Jind	35	Safidon	BJP	Ram Kumar Gautam	INC	Subhash Gangoli	BSP	Pinki	JJP	Sushil Bairagi
Jind	36	Jind	BJP	Krishan Lal Middha	INC	Mahabir Gupta	INLD	Narendra Nath Sharma	JJP	Dharampal Prajapat
Jind	37	Uchana Kalan	BJP	Devender Attri	INC	Brijendra Singh	INLD	Vinod Pal	JJP	Dushyant Chautala
Jind	38	Narwana (SC)	BJP	Krishan Kumar Bedi	INC	Satbir Dublain	INLD	Bidya Rani	JJP	Santosh Danoda
Fatehabad	39	Tohana	BJP	Devender Singh Babli	INC	Paramvir Singh	INLD	Kunal Karan Singh	JJP	Hawa Singh Khobra
Fatehabad	40	Fatehabad	BJP	Dura Ram	INC	Balwan Singh Daulatpuria	INLD	Sunaina Chautala	JJP	Subhash Gorchhiya
Fatehabad	41	Ratia (SC)	BJP	Sunita Duggal	INC	Jarnail Singh	BSP	Chhindwara Pal	JJP	Ramesh Kumar Od
Sirsa	42	Kalanwali (SC)	BJP	Rajinder Singh Desujodha	INC	Shishpal Singh	INLD	Gurtej Singh Sukhchain	JJP	Gurjant Tigri
Sirsa	43	Dabwali	BJP	Baldev Singh Mangiana	INC	Amit Sihag	INLD	Aditya Sihag Chautala	JJP	Digvijay Chautala
Sirsa	44	Rania	BJP	Shishpal Kamboj	INC	Sarva Mitra Kamboj	INLD	Arjun Singh Chautala	(Note: JJP-ASP alliance extended support to independent candidate Ranjit Singh Chautala in Rania.)	
Sirsa	45	Sirsa	(Note: BJP extended support to HLP candidate Gopal Goyal Kanda in Sirsa.)		INC	Gokul Setia	(Note: INLD-BSP extended support to HLP candidate Gopal Goyal Kanda in Sirsa.)		JJP	Pawan Sherpura
Sirsa	46	Ellenabad	BJP	Amir Chand Mehta	INC	Bharat Singh Beniwal	INLD	Abhay Singh Chautala	JJP	Anjani Ladha
Hisar	47	Adampur	BJP	Bhavya Bishnoi	INC	Chander Parkash	INLD	Randeep	JJP	Krishna Gangwa
Hisar	48	Uklana (SC)	BJP	Anoop Dhanak	INC	Naresh Selwal	INLD	Balraj Sabhwal	JJP	Rohtash Kandul
Hisar	49	Narnaund	BJP	Captain Abhimanyu	INC	Jassi Petwar	INLD	Umed Lohan	JJP	Yogesh Gautam
Hisar	50	Hansi	BJP	Vinod Bhayana	INC	Rahul Makkar	BSP	Ravindra Kumar	JJP	Shamsher Dhul
Hisar	51	Barwala	BJP	Ranbir Singh Gangwa	INC	Ram Niwas Ghorela	INLD	Sanjana Gahlot	JJP	Anantram
Hisar	52	Hisar	BJP	Kamal Gupta	INC	Ram Niwas Rara	INLD	Shyam Lal	JJP	Ravi Ahuja
Hisar	53	Nalwa	BJP	Randhir Parihar	INC	Anil Mann	BSP	Sarwan Verma	JJP	Virendra Chaudhary
Bhiwani	54	Loharu	BJP	Jai Parkash Dalal	INC	Rajbir Singh Fartiya	INLD	Bhoop Singh	JJP	Alka Arya
Charkhi Dadri	55	Badhra	BJP	Umed Patuwas	INC	Somveer Sangwan	INLD	Vijay Kumar	JJP	Yashveer Singh Sheoran
Charkhi Dadri	56	Dadri	BJP	Sunil Sangwan	INC	Manisha Sangwan	BSP	Anand Singh	JJP	Rajdeep Phogat
Bhiwani	57	Bhiwani	BJP	Ghanshyam Saraf	CPI(M)	Om Prakash	INLD	Karambir Yadav		
Bhiwani	58	Tosham	BJP	Shruti Choudhry	INC	Anirudh Chaudhry	BSP	Om Singh	JJP	Rajesh Bhardwaj
Bhiwani	59	Bawani Khera (SC)	BJP	Kapur Valmiki	INC	Pradeep Narwal	BSP	Sandeep Singh	JJP	Guddi Langyan
Rohtak	60	Meham	BJP	Deepak Niwas Hooda	INC	Balram Dangi	BSP	Hawa Singh		
Rohtak	61	Garhi Sampla-Kiloi	BJP	Manju Hooda	INC	Bhupinder Singh Hooda	INLD	Krishan	JJP	Sushila Deshwal
Rohtak	62	Rohtak	BJP	Manish Grover	INC	Bharat Bhushan Batra	INLD	Dillour	JJP	Jitendra Balhara
Rohtak	63	Kalanaur (SC)	BJP	Renu Dabla	INC	Shakuntla Khatak	BSP	Poonam	JJP	Mahendra Sudana
Jhajjar	64	Bahadurgarh	BJP	Dinesh Kaushik	INC	Rajinder Singh Joon	INLD	Sheela Rathi		
Jhajjar	65	Badli	BJP	Om Prakash Dhankhar	INC	Kuldeep Vats			JJP	Krishna Silana
Jhajjar	66	Jhajjar (SC)	BJP	Kaptan Birdhana	INC	Geeta Bhukkal	BSP	Dharambir Singh	JJP	Naseeb Valmiki
Jhajjar	67	Beri	BJP	Sanjay Kablana	INC	Raghuvir Singh Kadian	INLD	Permod	JJP	Sunil Dujana
Mahendragarh	68	Ateli	BJP	Arti Singh Rao	INC	Anita Yadav	BSP	Thakur Attar Lal	JJP	Ayushi Abhimanyu Rao
Mahendragarh	69	Mahendragarh	BJP	Kanwar Singh Yadav	INC	Rao Dan Singh	INLD	Surender Kaushik	ASP(KR)	Shashi Kumar
Mahendragarh	70	Narnaul	BJP	Om Parkash Yadav	INC	Rao Narinder Singh	INLD	Nar Singh	JJP	Suresh Saini
Mahendragarh	71	Nangal Chaudhry	BJP	Abhe Singh Yadav	INC	Manju Choudhary			JJP	Om Prakash
Rewari	72	Bawal (SC)	BJP	Krishna Kumar	INC	M L Ranga	INLD	Sampat Ram		
Rewari	73	Kosli	BJP	Anil Dahina	INC	Jagdish Yadav	BSP	Raj Kumar	JJP	Lavinder Singh Yadav
Rewari	74	Rewari	BJP	Laxman Singh Yadav	INC	Chiranjeev Rao	BSP	Somany Vijay	ASP(KR)	Moki Yadav
Gurgaon	75	Pataudi (SC)	BJP	Bimla Chaudhary	INC	Pearl Chaudhary	INLD	Pawan Kumar	JJP	Amar Nath
Gurgaon	76	Badshahpur	BJP	Rao Narbir Singh	INC	Vardhan Yadav	BSP	Joginder Singh	JJP	Surendra Kumar
Gurgaon	77	Gurgaon	BJP	Mukesh Sharma	INC	Mohit Grover	INLD	Gaurav Bhatia	JJP	Ashok Jangra
Gurgaon	78	Sohna	BJP	Tejpal Tanwar	INC	Rohtash Khatana	BSP	Surender Bhadana	ASP(KR)	Vinesh Gurjar
Nuh	79	Nuh	BJP	Sanjay Singh	INC	Aftab Ahmed	INLD	Tahir Hussain	JJP	Birender Singh Gangoli
Nuh	80	Ferozepur Jhirka	BJP	Naseem Ahmed	INC	Mamman Khan	INLD	Mohd Habir	JJP	Jan Mohammad
Nuh	81	Punahana	BJP	Aizaz Khan	INC	Mohammad Ilyas	INLD	Dayawati	ASP(KR)	Ataullah
Palwal	82	Hathin	BJP	Manoj Rawat	INC	Mohd Israil	INLD	Taiyab Hussain Bhimsika	JJP	Ravindra Sehrawat
Palwal	83	Hodal (SC)	BJP	Harinder Singh	INC	Udai Bhan	INLD	Sunil Kumar	JJP	Satveer Tanwar
Palwal	84	Palwal	BJP	Gaurav Gautam	INC	Karan Dalal	BSP	Abhisek Deshwal	ASP(KR)	Harit Bainsla
Faridabad	85	Prithla	BJP	Tek Chand Sharma	INC	Raghubir Tewatia	BSP	Surender Basistha	ASP(KR)	Giriraj Panghal
Faridabad	86	Faridabad NIT	BJP	Satish Fagna	INC	Neeraj Sharma	INLD	Nagender Bhadana	JJP	Haji Kamarat Ali
Faridabad	87	Badkhal	BJP	Dhanesh Adlakha	INC	Vijay Pratap	BSP	Manoj	JJP	Parvinder Singh
Faridabad	88	Ballabgarh	BJP	Mool Chand Sharma	INC	Parag Sharma				
Faridabad	89	Faridabad	BJP	Vipul Goel	INC	Lakhan Kumar Singla	INLD	NP Singh Baghel		
Faridabad	90	Tigaon	BJP	Rajesh Nagar	INC	Rohit Nagar	BSP	Lal Chand Sharma	JJP	Teeka Ram Bhardwaj

== Major issues ==
=== Farmer Protest and demands ===
The three farm laws by the BJP-led central government in 2020 have been a major point of contention with the farmers across various states. The farmers in Haryana also participated in the protests with the demand for the repeal of these laws, claiming that they adversely affect their crop sales and income was a prominent issue of that time. Another significant issue prior to the elections was the demand for a Minimum Support Price (MSP) for farmers. Farmer unions advocated the government to ensure that MSPs are legally mandated, arguing that it will provide a safety net for their produce and ensure fair prices. The demand arose from concerns that the farmers might face financial instability due to fluctuating market prices without such guarantees. The issue was part of broader discontent with the existent agricultural policies and became a key topic in the electoral debates.

=== Agnipath scheme ===
The Agnipath Scheme was a tour of duty style scheme introduced by the central government in June 2022, which proposed a four-year term recruitment into the Indian Army, after which 25% of them would continue their service in the army and rest would be dismissed. The scheme was seen as a move away from permanent recruitment and became a contentious issue in Haryana with concerns that it may lead to instability in employment for the soldiers. The state government introduced a quota for such relieved soldiers in certain state government jobs.

=== Unemployment ===
Unemployment was raised as a significant issue in the state as indicated by a survey by India Today. Opposition parties questioned the effectiveness of government policies in creating job opportunities for the youth, which made it a central debating topic in the elections.

=== Inflation ===
Rising prices of essential goods and services was also raised as a major election issue by the opposition parties. They claimed that the inflation has significantly impacted the cost of living in Haryana and questioned the government's ability to manage inflation and provide relief to affected citizens.

=== Wrestler protests ===
Haryana has a longstanding tradition in wrestling and sends the highest number of wrestlers who represent India at major international events. A group of wrestlers have been protesting against the earlier chief of Wrestling Federation of India BJP's Brij Bhushan Sharan Singh, who had sexual abuse charges filed against him. The wrestlers accused Singh of failing to provide them with safety and demanded justice against the same. For the Khelo India, which aims to promote sports at the grassroots level, the state was allocated only 3% of the total budget, leading to dissatisfaction and criticism from the sports community due to a perceived imbalance in the distribution of resources and support for athletes in the state.

== Campaigns ==
=== Bharatiya Janata Party ===
The BJP focused its campaign on highlighting its record of merit-based job creation and infrastructure development, and allegations of corruption during the previous Congress rule. Narendra Modi addressed four rallies and called the Congress the most "dishonest and deceitful" party. The BJP had earlier reshuffled its leadership and limited the campaigning of former chief minister Khattar, who had faced opposition for his views. Saini, who was not part of the earlier government, became the chief minister few months before the election. He had implemented several populist measures including merit-based recruitment for new government jobs, distribution plots to families below the poverty line, free bus travel to the poor, and regularisation of unauthorized colonies. The party emphasised the schemes and also frequently highlighted his background as an OBC leader. Additionally, the BJP dropped a third of its sitting legislators to counter the anti-incumbency sentiment and fielded more than 20 new candidates.

=== Indian National Congress ===
In July, the Congress released a charge sheet criticising the BJP government on issues like unemployment, unfilled government positions, increased crime, and alleged mistreatment of farmers. On 15 July, it launched the Haryana Maange Hisab Abhiyan campaign, which was aimed at visiting all 90 Assembly constituencies, exposing the government failures and gathering suggestions from the public for its election manifesto. Former chief minister Bhupinder Singh Hooda and state Congress chief Udai Bhan announced a 'Rath Yatra' after 20 August as a part of the campaign.

== Manifestos ==
=== Bharatiya Janata Party ===
The BJP's manifesto was titled Non-Stop Haryana ka Sankalp Patra, which outlined 20 key promises to address various issues across the state. The party promised to provide ₹2,100 (US$22) monthly assistance to women under the "Lakshmi Yojana" scheme and health insurance coverage of up to ₹1 million (US$11,000) per family under the "Nirogi-Ayushman Yojana". The party also promised a minimum support price for 24 crops. It further pledged to create job opportunities for local youth in ten industrial cities, including a special provision for 50,000 new jobs and guaranteed government jobs for 2 lakh youths without an exam. The manifesto also included guarantees of affordable housing for 5 lakh individuals in urban and rural areas, availability of gas cylinders for ₹500 (US$5.30) under the "Pradhan Mantri Ujjwala Yojana", free tablets for students under the "Awasiya Balika Yojana", and the construction of five Olympic class stadiums. Additionally, the party promised new airports, high-speed rail corridors between major cities and industrial expressways. It also aimed to raise social pensions based on scientific formulas and provide loans up to ₹2.5 million (US$27,000) for the other backward classes (OBC) for starting new business. Other promises include increased medical and engineering opportunities for OBC students, interest-free loans for agricultural education, and the creation of a sports university and cultural center in the state.

=== Indian National Congress ===
The Congress's manifesto focused on women empowerment, support for the elderly and disabled, job security for the youth, and improvement of the lives of families, farmers, and OBCs. It promised ₹2,000 (US$21) per month assistance for women and gas cylinders for ₹500 (US$5.30). It also guaranteed pensions of ₹6,000 (US$64) to the elderly, disabled, and widows, and that the restoration of the old pension scheme for the government employees. For the youth, the party promised 2 lakh government jobs and eradication of drugs from the state. It also promised 300 units of free electricity, medical coverage up to ₹2.5 million (US$27,000), a 100-yard plot and a two-room house costing ₹0.35 million (US$3,700) for the poor. The farmers were promised a legal guarantee of MSP and quick compensation for crop losses. The OBCs were promised a caste based survey and an increase in the creamy layer limit to ₹1 million (US$11,000).

== Surveys and polls ==
The exit polls were released on 5 October 2024 after the polling ended. Most of the exit polls predicted a victory for the Congress. However, in actual result the BJP formed the government.

Polling agency				Majority
Polling agency	BJP	INDIA	Others	Majority
Dainik Bhaskar	19-29	44-54	1-6	INDIA
People's Insight	53	31	6	BJP
DHRUV	27	57	6	INDIA
Matrize	18-24	55-62	5-14	INDIA
India Today - CVoter	20-28	50-58	10-16	INDIA
Politique Marquer	31	56	3	INDIA
South First - People's Pulse	26±6	55±6	5-9	INDIA
Actual Result	48	37	5	BJP

Polling agency				Lead
Polling agency	BJP	INDIA	Others	Lead
India Today - CVoter	37.2%	43.8%	19.0%	6.6%
South First - People's Pulse	38.0%	45.0%	17.0%	7.0%
Actual Result	39.94%	39.34%	20.72%	0.6%

== Results ==
The BJP achieved its third consecutive victory in Haryana following the vote count for the October 5, 2024, assembly election, held on Tuesday. The party overcame 10 years of anti-incumbency and defied exit polls that had forecasted a decisive win for the opposition Congress. The BJP secured 48 seats in the 90-member assembly, while Indian National Congress, won 37 seats. Three independents and two candidates from the INLD also emerged victorious.

=== By alliance/party ===
Vote Share by alliance
1. NDA (39.9%)
2. INDIA (39.3%)
3. INLD+ (5.96%)
4. JJP+ (1.00%)
5. NOTA (0.38%)
6. Other (13.4%)
Seat Share
1. NDA (53.3%)
2. INDIA (41.1%)
3. INLD+ (2.22%)
4. 0.00%
5. Other (3.32%)

Party	BJP	INC	INLD	IND
Seats	48	37	2	3

Result by alliance/party
Alliance/ Party		Popular vote			Seats		
Alliance/ Party		Votes	%	±pp	Contested	Won	+/−
Bharatiya Janata Party		5,548,800	39.94	▲3.45	89	48	▲8
INDIA	Indian National Congress	5,430,602	39.09	▲11.01	89	37	▲6
INDIA	Communist Party of India (Marxist)	34,373	0.25	▲0.18	1	0	Steady
INDIA	Total	5,464,975	39.34	▲11.19	90	37	▲6
INLD+	Indian National Lok Dal	575,192	4.14	▲1.70	51	2	▲1
INLD+	Bahujan Samaj Party	252,671	1.82	▼2.39	35	0	Steady
INLD+	Total	827,863	5.96	▼0.69	86	2	▲1
JJP+	Jannayak Janta Party	125,022	0.90	▼13.90	66	0	▼10
JJP+	Azad Samaj Party (Kanshi Ram)	19,534	0.10	New	12	0	Steady
JJP+	Total	144,556	1.00	▼13.80	78	0	▼10
Other parties			2.91	▼1.37	—N/a	0	▼1
Independents		1,448,835	10.47	▲1.30	—N/a	3	▼4
NOTA		53,300	0.38	▼0.15	—N/a		
Total			100%	—N/a	90	90	—N/a

=== By district ===
Result by district
District	Seats				
District	Seats	BJP	INC	INLD	OTH
Panchkula	2	1	1	—N/a	—N/a
Ambala	4	1	3	—N/a	—N/a
Yamunanagar	4	2	2	—N/a	—N/a
Kurukshetra	4	1	3	—N/a	—N/a
Kaithal	4	1	3	—N/a	—N/a
Karnal	5	5	—N/a	—N/a	—N/a
Panipat	4	4	—N/a	—N/a	—N/a
Sonipat	6	4	1	—N/a	1
Jind	5	4	1	—N/a	—N/a
Fatehabad	3	—N/a	3	—N/a	—N/a
Sirsa	5	—N/a	3	2	—N/a
Hisar	7	3	3	—N/a	1
Bhiwani	4	3	1	—N/a	—N/a
Charkhi Dadri	2	2	—N/a	—N/a	—N/a
Rohtak	4	—N/a	4	—N/a	—N/a
Jhajjar	4	—N/a	3	—N/a	1
Mahendragarh	4	3	1	—N/a	—N/a
Rewari	3	3	—N/a	—N/a	—N/a
Gurgaon	4	4	—N/a	—N/a	—N/a
Nuh	3	—N/a	3	—N/a	—N/a
Palwal	3	2	1	—N/a	—N/a
Faridabad	6	5	1	—N/a	—N/a
Total	90	48	37	2	3

=== Region-wise result ===
The election saw a distinct geographical divide, with the ruling BJP maintaining its dominance in urban areas, while the Congress and other independent/regional candidates put up a highly competitive performance in rural and semi-rural constituencies. Out of the 90 assembly seats, 25 were classified as urban and 65 as rural.

Results by Urban and Rural Seats
Region Type	Total Seats	Seats Won			
Region Type	Total Seats	BJP	INC	INLD	IND
Urban	25	17	6	0	2
Rural/ Semi-urban	65	31	31	2	1
Total	90	48	37	2	3

=== By constituency ===
District	Constituency & Turnout			Winner				Runner-up				Margin
District	#	Name	%	Candidate	Party	Votes	%	Candidate	Party	Votes	%	Margin
Panchkula	1	Kalka	72.12	Shakti Rani Sharma	BJP	60,612	41.53	Pardeep Chaudhary	INC	49,729	34.07	10,883
Panchkula	2	Panchkula	59.37	Chander Mohan	INC	67,397	47.97	Gian Chand Gupta	BJP	65,400	46.55	1,997
Ambala	3	Naraingarh	73.14	Shalley Chaudhary	INC	62,180	44.01	Pawan Saini	BJP	47,086	33.33	15,094
Ambala	4	Ambala Cantonment	64.36	Anil Vij	BJP	59,858	44.90	Chitra Sarwara	Ind	52,581	39.44	7,277
Ambala	5	Ambala City	63.04	Nirmal Singh	INC	84,475	50.98	Aseem Goel	BJP	73,344	44.26	11,131
Ambala	6	Mulana (SC)	70.93	Pooja Chaudhary	INC	79,089	49.48	Santosh Chauhan Sarwan	BJP	66,224	41.43	12,865
Yamunanagar	7	Sadhaura (SC)	78.51	Renu Bala	INC	57,534	33.04	Balwant Singh	BJP	55,835	32.06	1,699
Yamunanagar	8	Jagadhri	78.14	Akram Khan	INC	67,403	36.83	Kanwar Pal Gujjar	BJP	60,535	33.07	6,868
Yamunanagar	9	Yamunanagar	67.42	Ghanshyam Dass	BJP	73,185	44.62	Raman Tyagi	INC	50,748	30.94	22,437
Yamunanagar	10	Radaur	73.09	Shyam Singh Rana	BJP	73,348	47.93	Bishan Lal Saini	INC	60,216	39.35	13,132
Kurukshetra	11	Ladwa	75.07	Nayab Singh Saini	BJP	70,177	47.40	Mewa Singh	INC	54,123	36.55	16,054
Kurukshetra	12	Shahbad (SC)	70.43	Ram Karan	INC	61,050	50.37	Subhash Kalsana	BJP	54,609	45.05	6,441
Kurukshetra	13	Thanesar	65.44	Ashok Kumar Arora	INC	70,076	48.93	Subhash Sudha	BJP	66,833	46.67	3,243
Kurukshetra	14	Pehowa	68.60	Mandeep Chatha	INC	64,548	50.19	Jai Bhagwan Sharma	BJP	57,995	45.10	6,553
Kaithal	15	Guhla (SC)	69.47	Devender Hans	INC	64,611	48.26	Kulwant Ram Bazigar	BJP	41,731	31.17	22,880
Kaithal	16	Kalayat	74.57	Vikas Saharan	INC	48,142	30.01	Kamlesh Dhanda	BJP	34,723	21.65	13,419
Kaithal	17	Kaithal	75.50	Aditya Surjewala	INC	83,744	49.64	Leela Ram	BJP	75,620	44.82	8,124
Kaithal	18	Pundri	70.41	Satpal Jamba	BJP	42,805	31.48	Satbir Bhana	IND	40,608	29.86	2,197
Karnal	19	Nilokheri (SC)	63.57	Bhagwan Das	BJP	77,902	52.34	Dharam Pal Gonder	INC	59,057	39.68	18,845
Karnal	20	Indri	71.42	Ram Kumar Kashyap	BJP	80,465	51.39	Rakesh Kamboj	INC	65,316	41.71	15,149
Karnal	21	Karnal	56.52	Jagmohan Anand	BJP	90,006	59.66	Sumita Virk	INC	56,354	37.35	33,652
Karnal	22	Gharaunda	71.93	Harvinder Kalyan	BJP	87,236	49.92	Virender Singh Rathore	INC	82,705	47.33	4,531
Karnal	23	Assandh	66.67	Yogender Singh Rana	BJP	54,761	33.74	Shamsher Singh Gogi	INC	52,455	32.32	2,306
Panipat	24	Panipat Rural	69.40	Mahipal Dhanda	BJP	1,01,079	50.25	Sachin Kundu	INC	50,867	25.29	50,212
Panipat	25	Panipat City	62.72	Parmod Kumar Vij	BJP	81,750	55.66	Varinder Kumar Shah	INC	46,078	31.37	35,672
Panipat	26	Israna (SC)	70.29	Krishan Lal Panwar	BJP	67,538	52.09	Balbir Singh	INC	53,643	41.37	13,895
Panipat	27	Samalkha	73.06	Manmohan Bhadana	BJP	81,293	48.35	Dharam Singh Chhoker	INC	61,978	36.87	19,315
Sonipat	28	Ganaur	72.20	Devender Kadyan	Ind	77,248	54.77	Kuldeep Sharma	INC	42,039	29.81	35,209
Sonipat	29	Rai	69.97	Krishna Gahlawat	BJP	64,614	46.08	Jai Bhagwan Antil	INC	59,941	42.75	4,673
Sonipat	30	Kharkhauda (SC)	63.77	Pawan Kharkhauda	BJP	58,084	51.08	Jaiveer Singh	INC	52,449	46.12	5,635
Sonipat	31	Sonipat	57.52	Nikhil Madan	BJP	84,827	58.59	Surender Panwar	INC	55,200	38.13	29,627
Sonipat	32	Gohana	66.54	Arvind Sharma	BJP	57,055	43.62	Jagbir Singh Malik	INC	46,626	35.65	10,429
Sonipat	33	Baroda	68.12	Indu Raj Narwal	INC	54,462	41.90	Kapoor Singh Narwal	Ind	48,820	37.56	5,642
Jind	34	Julana	74.49	Vinesh Phogat	INC	65,080	46.86	Yogesh Bairagi	BJP	59,065	42.53	6,015
Jind	35	Safidon	74.64	Ram Kumar Gautam	BJP	58,983	40.22	Subhash Gangoli	INC	54,946	37.47	4,037
Jind	36	Jind	66.10	Krishan Lal Middha	BJP	68,920	50.96	Mahabir Gupta	INC	53,060	39.24	15,860
Jind	37	Uchana Kalan	75.59	Devender Attri	BJP	48,968	29.50	Brijendra Singh	INC	48,936	29.48	32
Jind	38	Narwana (SC)	70.99	Krishan Kumar Bedi	BJP	59,474	37.22	Satbir Dablain	INC	47,975	30.02	11,499
Fatehabad	39	Tohana	77.68	Paramvir Singh	INC	88,522	49.05	Devender Singh Babli	BJP	77,686	43.05	10,836
Fatehabad	40	Fatehabad	75.21	Balwan Singh Daulatpuria	INC	86,172	44.13	Dura Ram	BJP	83,920	42.98	2,252
Fatehabad	41	Ratia (SC)	72.18	Jarnail Singh	INC	86,426	52.54	Sunita Duggal	BJP	64,984	39.50	21,442
Sirsa	42	Kalanwali (SC)	76.13	Shishpal Singh	INC	66,728	47.47	Rajinder Singh Desujodha	BJP	43,769	31.13	22,959
Sirsa	43	Dabwali	78.34	Aditya Devilal	INLD	56,074	34.42	Amit Sihag	INC	55,464	34.04	610
Sirsa	44	Rania	76.17	Arjun Chautala	INLD	43,914	30.41	Sarva Mitra Kamboj	INC	39,723	27.51	4,191
Sirsa	45	Sirsa	68.05	Gokul Setia	INC	79,020	50.00	Gopal Goyal Kanda	HLP	71,786	45.43	7,234
Sirsa	46	Ellenabad	80.90	Bharat Singh Beniwal	INC	77,865	49.14	Abhay Chautala	INLD	62,865	39.67	15,000
Hisar	47	Adampur	75.80	Chander Prakash Jangra	INC	65,371	48.17	Bhavya Bishnoi	BJP	64,103	47.24	1,268
Hisar	48	Uklana (SC)	66.79	Naresh Selwal	INC	78,448	54.21	Anoop Dhanak	BJP	50,356	34.80	28,092
Hisar	49	Narnaund	76.34	Jassi Petwar	INC	84,801	51.37	Captain Abhimanyu	BJP	72,223	43.75	12,578
Hisar	50	Hansi	69.60	Vinod Bhayana	BJP	78,686	55.30	Rahul Makkar	INC	57,226	40.22	21,460
Hisar	51	Barwala	73.84	Ranbir Singh Gangwa	BJP	66,843	47.72	Ram Niwas Ghorela	INC	39,901	28.48	26,942
Hisar	52	Hisar	61.71	Savitri Jindal	Ind	49,231	43.76	Ram Niwas Rara	INC	30,290	26.93	18,941
Hisar	53	Nalwa	71.61	Randhir Parihar	BJP	66,330	51.20	Anil Mann	INC	54,186	41.83	12,144
Bhiwani	54	Loharu	79.73	Rajbir Singh Fartiya	INC	81,336	48.96	Jai Parkash Dalal	BJP	80,544	48.49	792
Charkhi Dadri	55	Badhra	71.36	Umed Singh	BJP	59,315	41.17	Somveer Sangwan	INC	51,730	35.90	7,585
Charkhi Dadri	56	Dadri	67.04	Sunil Satpal Sangwan	BJP	65,568	46.08	Manisha Sangwan	INC	63,611	44.70	1,957
Bhiwani	57	Bhiwani	60.90	Ghanshyam Saraf	BJP	67,087	46.19	Om Prakash	CPI(M)	34,373	23.66	32,714
Bhiwani	58	Tosham	71.86	Shruti Choudhry	BJP	76,414	47.55	Anirudh Chaudhry	INC	62,157	38.68	14,257
Bhiwani	59	Bawani Khera (SC)	70.33	Kapoor Valmiki	BJP	80,077	52.21	Pradeep Narwal	INC	58,298	38.01	21,779
Rohtak	60	Meham	73.92	Balram Dangi	INC	56,865	38.04	Balraj Kundu	Ind	38,805	25.96	18,060
Rohtak	61	Garhi Sampla-Kiloi	66.58	Bhupinder Singh Hooda	INC	1,08,539	72.72	Manju Hooda	BJP	37,074	24.84	71,465
Rohtak	62	Rohtak	60.17	Bharat Bhushan Batra	INC	59,419	49.25	Manish Grover	BJP	58,078	48.14	1,341
Rohtak	63	Kalanaur (SC)	65.71	Shakuntla Khatak	INC	69,348	48.41	Renu Dabla	BJP	57,116	39.87	12,232
Jhajjar	64	Bahadurgarh	64.38	Rajesh Joon	Ind	73,191	46.00	Dinesh Kaushik	BJP	31,192	19.61	41,999
Jhajjar	65	Badli	69.55	Kuldeep Vats	INC	68,160	51.52	Om Prakash Dhankhar	BJP	51,340	38.81	16,820
Jhajjar	66	Jhajjar (SC)	63.84	Geeta Bhukkal	INC	66,345	53.66	Kaptan Birdhana	BJP	52,790	42.70	13,555
Jhajjar	67	Beri	63.88	Raghuvir Singh Kadian	INC	60,630	50.96	Sanjay Kablana	BJP	25,160	21.15	35,470
Mahendragarh	68	Ateli	70.06	Aarti Singh Rao	BJP	57,737	39.75	Attar Lal	BSP	54,652	37.63	3,085
Mahendragarh	69	Mahendragarh	72.40	Kanwar Singh Yadav	BJP	63,036	40.56	Rao Dan Singh	INC	60,388	38.86	2,648
Mahendragarh	70	Narnaul	67.17	Om Parkash Yadav	BJP	57,635	54.08	Rao Narinder Singh	INC	40,464	37.97	17,171
Mahendragarh	71	Nangal Chaudhry	70.05	Manju Chaudhary	INC	61,989	52.32	Abhe Singh Yadav	BJP	55,059	46.47	6,930
Rewari	72	Bawal (SC)	67.55	Krishan Kumar	BJP	86,858	55.28	M. L. Ranga	INC	66,847	42.54	20,011
Rewari	73	Kosli	69.74	Anil Yadav	BJP	92,185	51.76	Jagdish Yadav	INC	74,976	42.10	17,209
Rewari	74	Rewari	65.62	Laxman Singh Yadav	BJP	83,747	49.95	Chiranjeev Rao	INC	54,978	32.79	28,769
Gurgaon	75	Pataudi (SC)	61.22	Bimla Chaudhary	BJP	98,519	62.40	Pearl Chaudhary	INC	51,989	32.93	46,530
Gurgaon	76	Badshahpur	54.08	Rao Narbir Singh	BJP	1,45,503	51.54	Vardhan Yadav	INC	84,798	30.04	60,705
Gurgaon	77	Gurgaon	51.87	Mukesh Sharma	BJP	1,22,615	53.29	Naveen Goyal	Ind	54,570	23.72	68,045
Gurgaon	78	Sohna	70.81	Tejpal Tanwar	BJP	61,243	30.09	Rohtash Khatana	INC	49,366	24.25	11,877
Nuh	79	Nuh	74.41	Aftab Ahmed	INC	91,833	59.26	Tahir Hussain	INLD	44,870	28.96	46,963
Nuh	80	Ferozepur Jhirka	73.21	Mamman Khan	INC	1,30,497	72.03	Naseem Ahmed	BJP	32,056	17.69	98,441
Nuh	81	Punahana	70.86	Mohammad Ilyas	INC	85,300	58.31	Rahish Khan	Ind	53,384	36.49	31,916
Palwal	82	Hathin	77.76	Mohd Israil	INC	79,907	42.45	Manoj Rawat	BJP	47,511	25.24	32,396
Palwal	83	Hodal (SC)	71.20	Harinder Singh	BJP	68,865	48.79	Udai Bhan	INC	66,270	46.95	2,595
Palwal	84	Palwal	71.59	Gaurav Gautam	BJP	1,09,118	56.57	Karan Singh Dalal	INC	75,513	39.15	33,605
Faridabad	85	Prithla	73.65	Raghubir Tewatia	INC	70,262	42.02	Tek Chand Sharma	BJP	49,721	29.74	20,541
Faridabad	86	Faridabad NIT	60.19	Satish Kumar Phagna	BJP	91,992	47.54	Neeraj Sharma	INC	58,775	30.38	33,217
Faridabad	87	Badkhal	48.15	Dhanesh Adlakha	BJP	79,476	49.68	Vijay Pratap Singh	INC	73,295	45.81	6,181
Faridabad	88	Ballabgarh	53.31	Mool Chand Sharma	BJP	61,806	42.16	Sharda Rathore	Ind	44,076	30.06	17,730
Faridabad	89	Faridabad	53.79	Vipul Goel	BJP	93,651	65.45	Lakhan Kumar Singla	INC	45,263	31.63	48,388
Faridabad	90	Tigaon	54.36	Rajesh Nagar	BJP	94,229	46.26	Lalit Nagar	Ind	56,828	27.90	37,401

== Allegations and controversy ==
On 5 November, 2025 Congress leader and Lok Sabha Leader of Opposition Rahul Gandhi alleged vote fraud in the 2024 Haryana legislative assembly elections. He claimed theft of over 25 lakh votes in Haryana. He presented evidence including repeated use of the same photographic images in voter rolls and cited the case of a Brazilian mode's image, which appeared on multiple voter IDs across Haryana.

Rahul Gandhi mentioned a specific example of a BJP sarpanch from Uttar Pradesh in his allegations regarding fake voters in Haryana during the 2024 Assembly elections. He claimed that thousands of voters were registered both in Haryana and Uttar Pradesh, violating electoral laws. Among these, he cited a BJP sarpanch named Dalchand, whose name and his son's name appeared on the voter lists in both UP and Haryana. Rahul pointed out that most of these dual-registered voters were BJP supporters or local leaders.

At the press conference, Rahul Gandhi showed the prior statement of Haryana Chief Minister Nayab Singh Saini confidently stated that he had the "system" (vayvastha (in hindi)) in place to ensure the BJP’s victory. He claimed that all arrangements were made properly for the BJP to win the election.

He also pointed to BJP leaders voting in multiple locations, addresses listed as "House no. Zero" being used fraudulently, and irregularities with postal ballots never seen before in Haryana. He stated that the Congress party physically verified some of these "House No. 0" addresses and found actual houses there, showing that the explanation by Chief Election Commissioner Gyanesh Kumar was false and misleading. He also dismissed Ganesh Kumar's claim that "House No. 0" voters were poor or homeless, saying this was a method to hide fraudulent voters. He presented examples such as a two-storey house registered as "House No. 0" and cases where multiple voters were registered at one address that physically could not exist. Gandhi accused the Election Commission of India (ECI) of colluding with the BJP in this "systematic theft of democracy," presenting what he called "100% proof" to back his claims.

Although none of these allegations have been justified by a court or any news outlet.

== Reactions ==
While the BJP celebrated their victory and hailed the elections as historic, the Congress rejected the Haryana election results, citing irregularities in certain districts and raising concerns about the functioning of EVMs. During a press conference, Congress spokesperson Pawan Khera declared that the party would not fully accept the outcome, though senior state leaders have conceded. Congress leader Jairam Ramesh suggested that in constituencies where more EVMs which were found to have high battery levels (99%) during the counting process, the BJP had won while in those with lower levels, the Congress won; EVM batteries last the full election cycle.

The Election Commission of India (ECI) has denied that it had received complaints about EVM batteries from candidates or polling agents during the process. The ECI also dismissed earlier complaints from the Congress about a slowdown in result updates as ill-founded.

Several leaders and political parties have raised concerns about EVM manipulation over the preceding years, while the ECI has consistently maintained that EVMs cannot be manipulated. In April 2024, the Supreme Court had rejected a plea which sought either a return to paper ballots or 100% VVPAT slip counting. The BJP alleges that the opposition makes these accusations when they face defeat.

== See also ==
- Politics of Haryana
- 2025 Haryana local elections
- 2025 Indian electoral controversy
