= Kulwant =

Kulwant is a given name. Notable people with the name include:

- Kulwant Ram Bazigar, Indian politician, member of the Haryana Legislative Assembly
- Kulwant Singh Bazigar, Indian politician
- Kulwant Singh Gill, Air Officer Commanding-in-Chief of Central Air Command of Indian Air Force
- Kulwant Khejroliya (born 1992), Indian cricketer
- Sukhvinderjeet Singh Kulwant (born 1960), Malaysian field hockey player
- Kulwant Singh Pandori (born 1973), Indian politician and a member of Aam Aadmi Party
- Kulwant Singh Pannu Indian Lieutenant Colonel
- Kulwant Rana, Indian politician
- Kulwant Roy (1914–1984), Indian photographer
- Kulwant Singh Sidhu, Indian politician
- Kulwant Singh (field hockey) (born 1948), Indian field hockey player
- Kulwant Singh (general), UYSM (born 1939), Indian military officer
- Kulwant Singh (politician), businessman and politician
- Kulwant Singh Virk (1921–1987), Indian-born author
