= Anil Yadav =

Indian politician

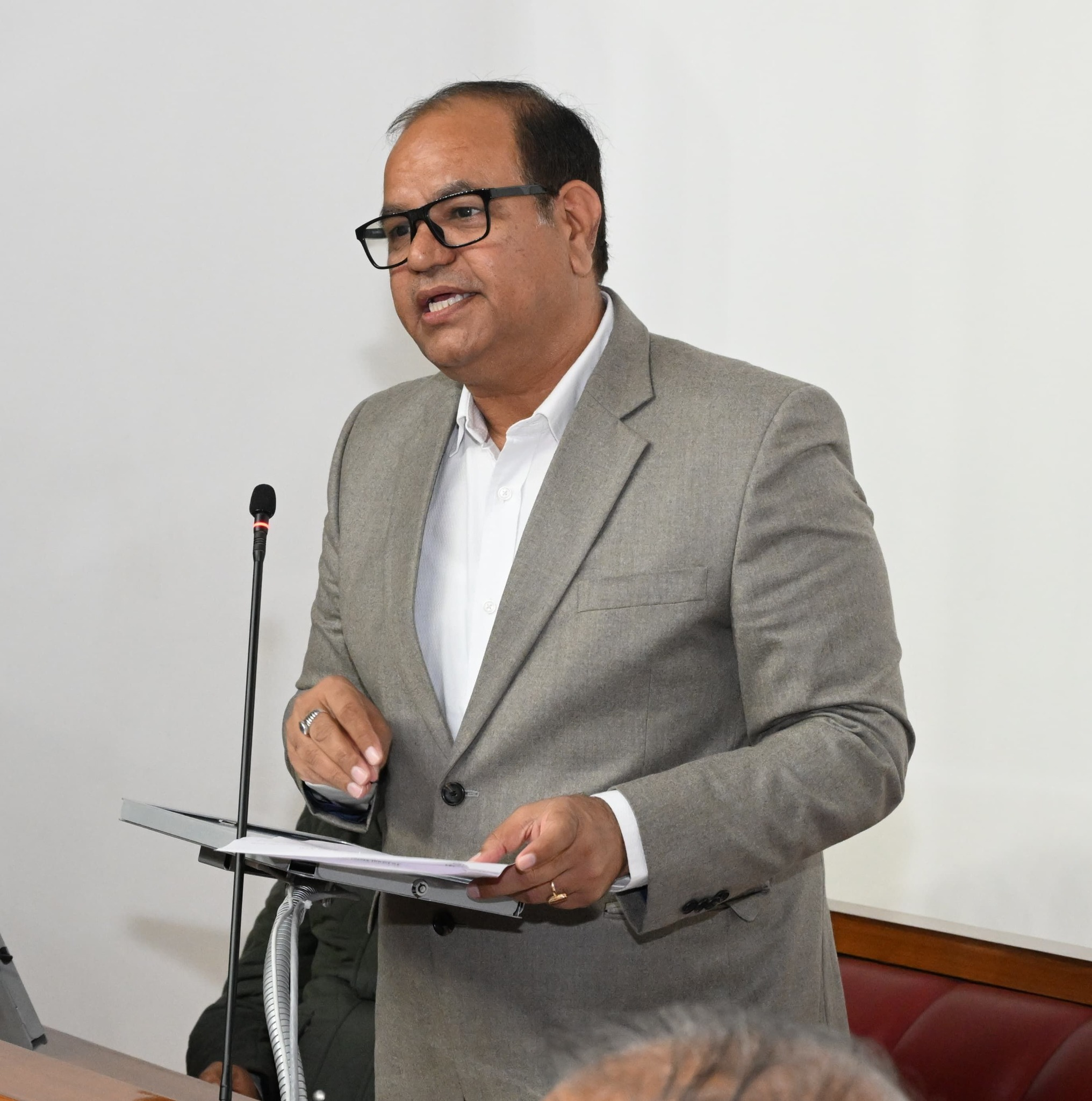
- Anil Yadav, MLA Kosli
- Incumbent
- Assumed office October 2024
- Preceded by: Laxman Singh Yadav
- Constituency: Kosli

Personal details
- Party: Bharatiya Janata Party

Anil Yadav (born 24 December 1976) is an Indian politician who is serving as Member of Legislative Assembly from Kosli Assembly constituency since 2024 as a member of the Bharatiya Janata Party.

== Early life and education ==
Yadav was born in Dahina village of Rewari District, Haryana and son of Shalu Singh Yadav.

== Political career ==
Yadav started his political career as Member of Zila Parishad of Rewari.

== Assembly Election 2024 ==
2024 Haryana Legislative Assembly election: Kosli
| Party | Candidate | Votes | % | ±% |
|---|---|---|---|---|
| BJP | Anil Yadav | 92185 | 51.76 | |
| INC | Jagdish Yadav | 74976 | 42.1 | |
| NOTA | None of the Above | 715 | 0.4 | |
| Majority | | 17209 | | |
| Turnout | | 178111 | | |
| Registered electors | | 2,54,470 | | |
| BJP hold | | Swing | | |
