= Pehowa Assembly constituency =

Legislative Assembly constituency in Haryana State, India

Coordinates: 29.98°N 76.58°E

Pehowa
- Constituency No. 14 for the Haryana Legislative Assembly

Constituency details
- Country: India
- Region: North India
- State: Haryana
- District: Kurukshetra
- Lok Sabha constituency: Kurukshetra
- Total electors: 1,86,967
- Reservation: None

Member of Legislative Assembly
- 15th Haryana Legislative Assembly
- Incumbent Mandeep Chatha
- Party: Indian National Congress
- Elected year: 2024

Pehowa Assembly constituency is one of the 90 Legislative Assembly constituencies of Haryana state in India.

It is part of Kurukshetra district.

== Members of the Legislative Assembly ==
Year	Member	Party
1967	Chiman Lal	Swatantra Party
1968	Piara Singh	Indian National Congress
1972	Piara Singh	Indian National Congress
1977	Tara Singh	Janata Party
1982	Piara Singh	Indian National Congress
1987	Balbir Singh Saini	Lokdal
1991	Jaswinder Singh Sandhu	Janata Party
1996	Jaswinder Singh Sandhu	Samata Party
2000	Jaswinder Singh Sandhu	Indian National Lok Dal
2005	Harmohinder Singh Chatha	Indian National Congress
2009	Harmohinder Singh Chatha	Indian National Congress
2014	Jaswinder Singh Sandhu	Indian National Lok Dal
2019	Sandeep Singh	Bharatiya Janata Party
2024	Mandeep Chatha	Indian National Congress

== Election results ==
=== Assembly Election 2024 ===
2024 Haryana Legislative Assembly election: Pehowa
Party	Candidate	Votes	%	±%
INC	Mandeep Chatha	64,548	50.19%	▲19.83
BJP	Jai Bhagwan Sharma (Dd)	57,995	45.10%	▲10.41
INLD	Baldev Singh Waraich	1,772	1.38%	New
JJP	Dr. Sukhwinder Kaur	1,253	0.97%	▼11.11
SSP	Gurnam Singh Charuni	1,170	0.91%	New
AAP	Gehal Singh Sandhu	890	0.69%	New
NOTA	None of the Above	306	0.24%	▼0.27
Margin of victory		6,553	5.10%	▲0.77
Turnout		1,28,602	68.79%	▼1.39
Registered electors		1,86,967		▲6.81
INC gain from BJP		Swing	▲15.50	

=== Assembly Election 2019 ===
2019 Haryana Legislative Assembly election: Pehowa
Party	Candidate	Votes	%	±%
BJP	Sandeep Singh	42,613	34.69%	4.18%
INC	Mandeep Singh Chatha	37,299	30.36%	3.65%
Independent	Swami Sandeep Onkar	21,775	17.73%	
JJP	Randhir Singh	14,846	12.09%	
Independent	Pardeep Kumar	1,785	1.45%	
BSP	Onkar Singh	1,741	1.42%	
LSP	Nasib Singh	765	0.62%	
NOTA	Nota	622	0.51%	−0.08%
Margin of victory		5,314	4.33%	−2.85%
Turnout		1,22,842	70.18%	−10.72%
Registered electors		1,75,028		8.66%
BJP gain from INLD		Swing	-2.99%	

=== Assembly Election 2014 ===
2014 Haryana Legislative Assembly election: Pehowa
Party	Candidate	Votes	%	±%
INLD	Jaswinder Singh	49,110	37.68%	8.28%
BJP	Jai Bhagwan Sharma ( D.D.)	39,763	30.51%	12.45%
INC	Mandeep Singh Chatha	34,810	26.71%	−6.52%
HJC(BL)	Baba Baldev Singh	3,158	2.42%	−3.23%
NOTA	None of the Above	769	0.59%	
Independent	Suresh Kumar	716	0.55%	
Margin of victory		9,347	7.17%	3.35%
Turnout		1,30,322	80.90%	1.79%
Registered electors		1,61,081		19.51%
INLD gain from INC		Swing	4.46%	

=== Assembly Election 2009 ===
2009 Haryana Legislative Assembly election: Pehowa
Party	Candidate	Votes	%	±%
INC	Harmohinder Singh	35,429	33.23%	−0.42%
INLD	Jaswinder Singh	31,349	29.40%	−0.06%
BJP	Balbir Singh Saini	19,260	18.06%	−11.97%
Independent	Rajinder Kumar	6,611	6.20%	
HJC(BL)	Baldev Singh	6,024	5.65%	
BSP	Ravinder Singh	2,974	2.79%	−0.93%
Independent	Shamsher Singh	2,252	2.11%	
Independent	Balwinder Singh	1,499	1.41%	
LJP	Raghbir Chand	656	0.62%	0.07%
Independent	Rajesh Puri	536	0.50%	
Margin of victory		4,080	3.83%	0.21%
Turnout		1,06,631	79.11%	3.43%
Registered electors		1,34,786		0.91%
INC hold		Swing	-0.42%	

=== Assembly Election 2005 ===
2005 Haryana Legislative Assembly election: Pehowa
Party	Candidate	Votes	%	±%
INC	Harmohinder Singh	34,008	33.64%	10.15%
BJP	Balbir Singh Saini	30,355	30.03%	
INLD	Jaswinder Singh	29,773	29.45%	−11.66%
BSP	Kalwant Singh	3,758	3.72%	2.60%
Independent	Harnam Singh	1,671	1.65%	
BRP	Jagroop Singh	585	0.58%	
LJP	Raghbir Chand	555	0.55%	
Margin of victory		3,653	3.61%	−12.47%
Turnout		1,01,081	75.68%	2.10%
Registered electors		1,33,569		12.13%
INC gain from INLD		Swing	-7.47%	

=== Assembly Election 2000 ===
2000 Haryana Legislative Assembly election: Pehowa
Party	Candidate	Votes	%	±%
INLD	Jaswinder Singh	36,031	41.12%	
Independent	Balbir Singh Saini	21,940	25.04%	
INC	Baldev Singh	20,584	23.49%	−0.63%
Independent	Sadhu Ram Saini	5,041	5.75%	
Independent	Subash Chander	989	1.13%	
BSP	Bhupinder Singh	983	1.12%	−1.33%
Independent	Sukhvir Singh	977	1.11%	
Margin of victory		14,091	16.08%	1.10%
Turnout		87,629	73.58%	−3.64%
Registered electors		1,19,119		−3.25%
INLD gain from SAP		Swing	10.49%	

=== Assembly Election 1996 ===
1996 Haryana Legislative Assembly election: Pehowa
Party	Candidate	Votes	%	±%
SAP	Jaswinder Singh	35,482	39.10%	
INC	Balbir Singh Saini	21,887	24.12%	6.52%
Independent	Gurinderjeet Singh Nat	12,550	13.83%	
HVP	Jasmer Singh Sheokand	11,657	12.85%	
BSP	Satpal Kashyap	2,226	2.45%	−1.47%
Independent	Suresh	1,439	1.59%	
AIIC(T)	Gian Singh S/O Joginder Singh	998	1.10%	
Independent	Balbir Singh	764	0.84%	
Margin of victory		13,595	14.98%	7.22%
Turnout		90,739	77.22%	2.57%
Registered electors		1,23,119		16.37%
SAP gain from JP		Swing	8.47%	

=== Assembly Election 1991 ===
1991 Haryana Legislative Assembly election: Pehowa
Party	Candidate	Votes	%	±%
JP	Jaswinder Singh	23,236	30.63%	28.11%
Independent	Balbir Singh	17,344	22.86%	
INC	Harmohinder Singh	13,350	17.60%	−10.70%
CPI(M)	Gurmukh Singh	11,066	14.59%	
BJP	Ishwar Dayal	5,194	6.85%	
BSP	Giasuram	2,973	3.92%	
Independent	Harnam Singh	1,729	2.28%	
Margin of victory		5,892	7.77%	−25.34%
Turnout		75,861	74.65%	−0.08%
Registered electors		1,05,803		9.50%
JP gain from LKD		Swing	-30.78%	

=== Assembly Election 1987 ===
1987 Haryana Legislative Assembly election: Pehowa
Party	Candidate	Votes	%	±%
LKD	Balbir Singh	43,756	61.41%	52.09%
INC	Tara Singh	20,162	28.30%	−8.55%
Independent	Giasu Ram	3,208	4.50%	
JP	Sham Singh	1,797	2.52%	−8.92%
Independent	Bhagwan Singh	454	0.64%	
Independent	Prithi Singh	339	0.48%	
Independent	Parkash Kaur	301	0.42%	
Margin of victory		23,594	33.11%	29.67%
Turnout		71,256	74.72%	0.92%
Registered electors		96,628		23.85%
LKD gain from INC		Swing	24.56%	

=== Assembly Election 1982 ===
1982 Haryana Legislative Assembly election: Pehowa
Party	Candidate	Votes	%	±%
INC	Piara Singh	20,877	36.85%	18.52%
Independent	Balbir Singh	18,928	33.41%	
JP	Sham Singh	6,484	11.44%	−27.96%
LKD	Priti Pal Singh Alias Chuhar Singh	5,277	9.31%	
Independent	Surjit Singh	4,225	7.46%	
Independent	Faqira Ram	760	1.34%	
Margin of victory		1,949	3.44%	−17.63%
Turnout		56,656	73.81%	6.01%
Registered electors		78,019		21.13%
INC gain from JP		Swing	-2.55%	

=== Assembly Election 1977 ===
1977 Haryana Legislative Assembly election: Pehowa
Party	Candidate	Votes	%	±%
JP	Tara Singh	16,992	39.40%	
INC	Piara Singh	7,904	18.33%	−25.05%
Independent	Gurmukh Singh	6,434	14.92%	
Independent	Mohinder Singh	3,636	8.43%	
Independent	Tara Chand	3,122	7.24%	
Independent	Param Jit	2,510	5.82%	
CPI	Manjit Singh	2,145	4.97%	
Independent	Sukhwant Singh	279	0.65%	
Margin of victory		9,088	21.07%	9.15%
Turnout		43,123	67.80%	−8.38%
Registered electors		64,410		−2.53%
JP gain from INC		Swing	-3.97%	

=== Assembly Election 1972 ===
1972 Haryana Legislative Assembly election: Pehowa
Party	Candidate	Votes	%	±%
INC	Piara Singh	21,224	43.38%	4.69%
Independent	Khushvant Singh	15,391	31.45%	
ABJS	Chiman Lal	6,375	13.03%	−11.98%
Independent	Kulwant Rai	4,015	8.21%	
Independent	Tahal Chand	1,641	3.35%	
Independent	Daliy Singh	285	0.58%	
Margin of victory		5,833	11.92%	−1.76%
Turnout		48,931	76.18%	23.79%
Registered electors		66,082		10.57%
INC hold		Swing	4.69%	

=== Assembly Election 1968 ===
1968 Haryana Legislative Assembly election: Pehowa
Party	Candidate	Votes	%	±%
INC	Piara Singh	11,798	38.68%	9.23%
ABJS	Ram Dia	7,627	25.01%	
SWA	Amar Nath	7,181	23.55%	−10.92%
CPI	Raghbir Singh	3,406	11.17%	−2.50%
Independent	Yash Paul	486	1.59%	
Margin of victory		4,171	13.68%	8.66%
Turnout		30,498	52.39%	−18.57%
Registered electors		59,767		4.30%
INC gain from SWA		Swing	4.22%	

=== Assembly Election 1967 ===
1967 Haryana Legislative Assembly election: Pehowa
Party	Candidate	Votes	%	±%
SWA	Chiman Lal	13,010	34.47%	
INC	M. Singh	11,117	29.45%	
Independent	A. Nath	7,391	19.58%	
CPI	T. Singh	5,160	13.67%	
Independent	A. Singh	637	1.69%	
Independent	T. Dass	429	1.14%	
Margin of victory		1,893	5.02%	
Turnout		37,744	70.96%	
Registered electors		57,305		
SWA win (new seat)				

== See also ==
- List of constituencies of the Haryana Legislative Assembly
- Kurukshetra district
