= Vikas Saharan =

Indian politician

Member of the Haryana Legislative Assembly
- Incumbent
- Assumed office 8 October 2024
- Preceded by: Kamlesh Dhanda
- Constituency: Kalayat

Personal details
- Party: Indian National Congress
- Profession: Politician

Vikas Saharan is an Indian politician from Haryana. He is a Member of the Haryana Legislative Assembly from 2024, representing Kalayat Assembly constituency as a Member of the Indian National Congress party. His father is Sh. Jai Prakash (JP) is currently Member of Parliament from Hisar. He also served as Deputy Minister in Ministry of Petroleum and Chemicals in Chandra Shekhar ministry. He was member of the 9th, 11th, and 14th Lok Sabha. Sh. VIKAS SAHARAN is a youth Icon of Indian national congress and represents KALAYAT constituency.

== See also ==
- 2024 Haryana Legislative Assembly election
- Haryana Legislative Assembly
