= Ashok Kumar Arora =

Indian politician

Member of the Haryana Legislative Assembly
- Incumbent
- Assumed office 8 October 2024
- Preceded by: Subhash Sudha
- Constituency: Thanesar

Personal details
- Party: Indian National Congress
- Profession: Politician

Ashok Kumar Arora is an Indian politician from Haryana. He is a Member of the Haryana Legislative Assembly from 2024, representing Thanesar Assembly constituency as a Member of the Indian National Congress party.

== See also ==
- 2024 Haryana Legislative Assembly election
- Haryana Legislative Assembly
