= Bhagwan Das KabirPanthi =

Indian politician

Member of the Haryana Legislative Assembly
- Incumbent
- Assumed office 8 October 2024
- Preceded by: Dharam Pal Gonder
- Constituency: Nilokheri

Member of the Haryana Legislative Assembly
- In office 2014–2019
- Preceded by: Mamu Ram
- Succeeded by: Dharam Pal Gonder
- Constituency: Nilokheri

Personal details
- Party: Bharatiya Janata Party

Bhagwan Das KabirPanthi is an Indian politician from Haryana. In the 2024 Haryana Legislative Assembly election, he was elected MLA from Nilokheri, on a Bharatiya Janta Party ticket.
