= Kalayat Assembly constituency =

Legislative Assembly constituency in Haryana State, India

Coordinates: 29.68°N 76.25°E

Kalayat
- Constituency No. 16 for the Haryana Legislative Assembly

Constituency details
- Country: India
- Region: North India
- State: Haryana
- District: Kaithal
- Lok Sabha constituency: Kurukshetra
- Total electors: 2,14,407
- Reservation: None

Member of Legislative Assembly
- 15th Haryana Legislative Assembly
- Incumbent Vikas Saharan
- Party: Indian National Congress
- Elected year: 2024

Kalayat is one of the 90 Legislative Assembly constituencies of Haryana, India.

It is part of Kaithal district. Vikas Saharan is the incumbent MLA.

== Members of the Legislative Assembly ==
Year	Member	Party
1967	Maru Singh Malik	Swatantra Party
1968	Bhagtu Ram Malik	Indian National Congress
1972	Bhagat Ram	Indian National Congress (O)
1977	Prit Singh	Janata Party
1982	Jogi Ram	Lokdal
1987	Banarasi	Lokdal
1991	Bharath Singh	Janata Party
1996	Ram Bhaj	Haryana Vikas Party
2000	Deena Ram	Indian National Lok Dal
2005	Geeta Bhukkal	Indian National Congress
2009	Rampal Majra	Indian National Lok Dal
2014	Jai Parkash	Independent
2019	Kamlesh Dhanda	Bharatiya Janata Party
2024	Vikas Saharan	Indian National Congress

== Election results ==
=== Assembly Election 2024 ===
2024 Haryana Legislative Assembly election: Kalayat
Party	Candidate	Votes	%	±%
INC	Vikas Saharan	48,142	30.01%	▲0.69
BJP	Kamlesh Dhanda	34,723	21.65%	▼13.54
Independent	Anita Dhull Badsikri	25,302	15.77%	New
INLD	Rampal Majra	18,850	11.75%	▲11.00
Independent	Vinod Nirmal	14,508	9.04%	New
Independent	Satvinder Singh Rana	5,859	3.65%	New
AAP	Anurag Dhanda	5,482	3.42%	▲2.47
NOTA	None of the Above	393	0.24%	New
Margin of victory		13,419	8.37%	▲2.50
Turnout		1,60,413	74.92%	▼0.74
Registered electors		2,14,407		▲5.95
INC gain from BJP		Swing	▼5.18	

=== Assembly Election 2019 ===
2019 Haryana Legislative Assembly election: Kalayat
Party	Candidate	Votes	%	±%
BJP	Kamlesh Dhanda	53,805	35.19	18.16
INC	Jai Parkash	44,833	29.32	14.29
JJP	Satvinder Singh	37,425	24.48	
BSP	Jogi Ram	7,113	4.65	1.88
LSP	Rakesh Singh	2,448	1.60	
AAP	Seema	1,453	0.95	
INLD	Om Parkash	1,149	0.75	−27.20
CPI(M)	Satywan	855	0.56	
Sarva Hit Party	Bhumi Dev	807	0.53	
Margin of victory		8,974	5.87	0.38
Turnout		1,52,896	75.66	−6.85
Registered electors		2,02,080		9.11
BJP gain from Independent		Swing	1.75	

=== Assembly Election 2014 ===
2014 Haryana Legislative Assembly election: Kalayat
Party	Candidate	Votes	%	±%
Independent	Bhai Jai Parkash (J.P.)	51,106	33.44	
INLD	Ram Pal Majra	42,716	27.95	−15.22
BJP	Dharam Pal	26,028	17.03	15.50
INC	Ranvir Singh Mann	22,971	15.03	−20.85
BSP	Jogi Ram	4,232	2.77	−6.53
Independent	Balvir	998	0.65	
Margin of victory		8,390	5.49	−1.81
Turnout		1,52,827	82.51	3.48
Registered electors		1,85,214		13.64
Independent gain from INLD		Swing	-9.73	

=== Assembly Election 2009 ===
2009 Haryana Legislative Assembly election: Kalayat
Party	Candidate	Votes	%	±%
INLD	Rampal Majra	55,614	43.17	2.29
INC	Tejender Pal Singh	46,214	35.88	−6.69
BSP	Ramesh	11,974	9.30	7.57
HJC(BL)	Vinod	9,021	7.00	
BJP	Nar Singh Dhanda	1,966	1.53	−1.31
Independent	Sube Singh	1,377	1.07	
Independent	Tarsem	959	0.74	
Margin of victory		9,400	7.30	5.62
Turnout		1,28,814	79.04	1.30
Registered electors		1,62,982		50.92
INLD gain from INC		Swing	0.61	

=== Assembly Election 2005 ===
2005 Haryana Legislative Assembly election: Kalayat
Party	Candidate	Votes	%	±%
INC	Geeta Bhukkal	35,730	42.56	17.10
INLD	Pritam	34,318	40.88	0.34
Independent	Baldev	7,795	9.29	
BJP	Jaswant Kumar	2,381	2.84	
Independent	Ramesh Kumar	1,579	1.88	
BSP	Balwan	1,450	1.73	−2.82
Independent	Om Parkash	488	0.58	
Margin of victory		1,412	1.68	−13.39
Turnout		83,945	77.73	8.89
Registered electors		1,07,989		5.17
INC gain from INLD		Swing	2.03	

=== Assembly Election 2000 ===
2000 Haryana Legislative Assembly election: Kalayat
Party	Candidate	Votes	%	±%
INLD	Deena Ram	28,370	40.54	
INC	Baldev Singh	17,823	25.47	12.09
Independent	Ram Sarup	17,777	25.40	
BSP	Nathu Ram	3,184	4.55	−2.81
HVP	Hawa Singh	2,337	3.34	−33.07
Independent	Balbir	405	0.58	
Margin of victory		10,547	15.07	7.09
Turnout		69,986	68.84	3.83
Registered electors		1,02,681		−0.25
INLD gain from HVP		Swing	4.32	

=== Assembly Election 1996 ===
1996 Haryana Legislative Assembly election: Kalayat
Party	Candidate	Votes	%	±%
HVP	Ram Bhaj	23,351	36.41	27.83
SAP	Dina Ram	18,233	28.43	
INC	Jogi Ram	8,581	13.38	−17.54
AIIC(T)	Bal Dev	7,383	11.51	
BSP	Kamla	4,718	7.36	
Independent	Mahabir	640	1.00	
Margin of victory		5,118	7.98	2.68
Turnout		64,132	65.01	0.98
Registered electors		1,02,939		13.20
HVP gain from JP		Swing	0.20	

=== Assembly Election 1991 ===
1991 Haryana Legislative Assembly election: Kalayat
Party	Candidate	Votes	%	±%
JP	Bharath Singh	20,049	36.22	
INC	Jogi Ram S/O Datu Ram	17,117	30.92	3.63
HVP	Randhir	4,750	8.58	
Independent	Hardeva	3,881	7.01	
Independent	Pirthi	3,062	5.53	
Independent	Raj Mal	2,818	5.09	
Independent	Jogi Ram S/O Mansa Ram	1,097	1.98	
BJP	Jagdev	888	1.60	
Independent	Rajni Devi	448	0.81	
Independent	Gaje Singh	370	0.67	
Independent	Nafe Singh	288	0.52	
Margin of victory		2,932	5.30	−36.33
Turnout		55,360	64.04	−9.39
Registered electors		90,933		7.83
JP gain from LKD		Swing	-32.70	

=== Assembly Election 1987 ===
1987 Haryana Legislative Assembly election: Kalayat
Party	Candidate	Votes	%	±%
LKD	Banarasi	41,872	68.92	11.97
INC	Baldev Singh	16,582	27.29	−7.76
VHP	Dhanpar	887	1.46	
Independent	Ram Lal	401	0.66	
Margin of victory		25,290	41.62	19.73
Turnout		60,758	73.43	4.86
Registered electors		84,332		18.90
LKD hold		Swing	11.97	

=== Assembly Election 1982 ===
1982 Haryana Legislative Assembly election: Kalayat
Party	Candidate	Votes	%	±%
LKD	Jogi Ram	27,228	56.94	
INC	Baldev	16,760	35.05	19.28
Independent	Gaje Singh	1,067	2.23	
Independent	Ram Saran	625	1.31	
Independent	Sarwan	476	1.00	
Independent	Maru Ram	416	0.87	
Independent	Mamu	396	0.83	
Independent	Prit Singh	288	0.60	
Margin of victory		10,468	21.89	−2.69
Turnout		47,816	68.57	16.03
Registered electors		70,926		21.34
LKD gain from JP		Swing	14.26	

=== Assembly Election 1977 ===
1977 Haryana Legislative Assembly election: Kalayat
Party	Candidate	Votes	%	±%
JP	Prit Singh	12,953	42.68	
Independent	Maru	5,494	18.10	
INC	Ran Singh	4,786	15.77	−25.29
Independent	Bhagat Ram	4,771	15.72	
CPI	Rangi Ram	1,489	4.91	−0.54
Independent	Chhaju Ram	855	2.82	
Margin of victory		7,459	24.58	21.41
Turnout		30,348	52.54	−14.03
Registered electors		58,450		−1.71
JP gain from INC(O)		Swing	-1.54	

=== Assembly Election 1972 ===
1972 Haryana Legislative Assembly election: Kalayat
Party	Candidate	Votes	%	±%
INC(O)	Bhagat Ram S/O Hansa	17,032	44.22	
INC	Bhagat Ram S/O Jamni	15,812	41.06	−20.22
Independent	Gandhi	3,396	8.82	
CPI	Man Singh	2,097	5.44	
Independent	Sita Ram	176	0.46	
Margin of victory		1,220	3.17	−24.52
Turnout		38,513	66.57	38.12
Registered electors		59,469		10.09
INC(O) gain from INC		Swing	-17.05	

=== Assembly Election 1968 ===
1968 Haryana Legislative Assembly election: Kalayat
Party	Candidate	Votes	%	±%
INC	Bhagtu	9,117	61.27	20.09
SWA	Anant Ram	4,998	33.59	−8.54
SSP	Faqir Chand	482	3.24	
Independent	Shiria	282	1.90	
Margin of victory		4,119	27.68	26.74
Turnout		14,879	28.45	−47.58
Registered electors		54,020		1.30
INC gain from SWA		Swing	19.14	

=== Assembly Election 1967 ===
1967 Haryana Legislative Assembly election: Kalayat
Party	Candidate	Votes	%	±%
SWA	Maru	15,910	42.13	
INC	B. Ram	15,552	41.18	
CPI	M. Singh	3,742	9.91	
Independent	R. Ram	982	2.60	
Independent	Surju	430	1.14	
Independent	B. Ram	405	1.07	
Independent	M. Ram	386	1.02	
Independent	Jati	243	0.64	
Independent	S. Singh	112	0.30	
Margin of victory		358	0.95	
Turnout		37,762	76.03	
Registered electors		53,328		
SWA win (new seat)				

== See also ==
- List of constituencies of the Haryana Legislative Assembly
- Kaithal district
