= Samalkha Assembly constituency =

Legislative Assembly constituency in Haryana State, India

Coordinates: 29.24°N 77.01°E

- Constituency No. 27 for the Haryana Legislative Assembly

Constituency details
- Country: India
- Region: North India
- State: Haryana
- District: Panipat
- Lok Sabha constituency: Karnal
- Total electors: 2,29,082
- Reservation: None

Member of Legislative Assembly
- 15th Haryana Legislative Assembly
- Incumbent Manmohan Bhadana
- Party: Bhartiya Janata Party

Samalkha is one of the 90 Haryana Legislative Assembly constituencies in India. It is part of Panipat district.

== Members of the Legislative Assembly ==
| Election | Name | Party |
|---|---|---|
| 1967 | Randhir | Bharatiya Jana Sangh |
| 1968 | Kartar Singh | Indian National Congress |
| 1972 | Hari Singh | Indian National Congress |
| 1977 | Mool Chand | Janata Party |
| 1982 | Katar Singh | Indian National Congress |
| 1987 | Sachdev | Lokdal |
| 1991 | Hari Singh | Janata Dal |
| 1996 | Kartar Singh Bhadana | Haryana Vikas Party |
| 2000 | Kartar Singh Bhadana | Indian National Lok Dal |
| 2005 | Bharat Singh | Indian National Congress |
| 2009 | Dharam Singh Chhoker | Haryana Janhit Congress |
| 2014 | Ravinder Machhrouli | Independent |
| 2019 | Dharam Singh Chhoker | Indian National Congress |
| 2024 | Manmohan Bhadana | Bhartiya Janata Party |

== Election results ==
=== Assembly Election 2024 ===
2024 Haryana Legislative Assembly election: Samalkha
| Party | Candidate | Votes | % | ±% |
|---|---|---|---|---|
| BJP | Manmohan Bhadana | 81,293 | 48.35% | ▲5.71 |
| INC | Dharam Singh Chhoker | 61,978 | 36.87% | ▼15.29 |
| Independent | Ravinder Machhrauli | 21,132 | 12.57% | New |
| INLD | Rajesh | 1,103 | 0.66% | New |
| AAP | Jaikanwar Alias Bittu Pahalwan | 1,060 | 0.63% | New |
| NOTA | None of the Above | 419 | 0.25% | New |
| Margin of victory | | 19,315 | 11.49% | ▲1.97 |
| Turnout | | 1,68,119 | 73.34% | ▼1.50 |
| Registered electors | | 2,29,082 | | ▲9.25 |
| BJP gain from INC | | Swing | ▼3.80 | |

=== Assembly Election 2019 ===
2019 Haryana Legislative Assembly election: Samalkha
| Party | Candidate | Votes | % | ±% |
|---|---|---|---|---|
| INC | Dharam Singh Chhoker | 81,898 | 52.16% | ▲30.28 |
| BJP | Shashi Kant Kaushik | 66,956 | 42.64% | ▲21.29 |
| JJP | Brham Pal Rawal | 4,114 | 2.62% | |
| BSP | Joginder | 2,083 | 1.33% | ▲0.59 |
| Margin of victory | | 14,942 | 9.52% | ▼4.02 |
| Turnout | | 1,57,025 | 74.84% | ▼6.86 |
| Registered electors | | 2,09,824 | | ▲13.91 |
| INC gain from Independent | | Swing | ▲16.74 | |

=== Assembly Election 2014 ===
2014 Haryana Legislative Assembly election: Samalkha
| Party | Candidate | Votes | % | ±% |
|---|---|---|---|---|
| Independent | Ravinder Machhrouli | 53,294 | 35.42% | |
| INC | Dharam Singh Chhoker | 32,921 | 21.88% | ▼1.32 |
| BJP | Shashi Kant Kaushik | 32,134 | 21.35% | ▲20.09 |
| INLD | Ram Bhateri Rawal | 26,477 | 17.59% | ▼5.1 |
| BSP | Om Parkash Gujjar | 1,109 | 0.74% | ▼6.69 |
| HJC(BL) | Karan Singh | 1,092 | 0.73% | ▼34.46 |
| Margin of victory | | 20,373 | 13.54% | ▲1.54 |
| Turnout | | 1,50,483 | 81.69% | ▲3.45 |
| Registered electors | | 1,84,208 | | ▲28.52 |
| Independent gain from HJC(BL) | | Swing | ▲0.23 | |

=== Assembly Election 2009 ===
2009 Haryana Legislative Assembly election: Samalkha
| Party | Candidate | Votes | % | ±% |
|---|---|---|---|---|
| HJC(BL) | Dharm Singh Chhoker | 39,463 | 35.19% | |
| INC | Sanjay Chhoker | 26,012 | 23.20% | ▼25.45 |
| INLD | Manoj Jaurasi | 25,448 | 22.69% | ▼3.62 |
| BSP | Manmohan Bhadana | 8,334 | 7.43% | |
| NCP | Hari Singh Nalwa | 8,166 | 7.28% | ▲6.68 |
| BJP | Anju Rani | 1,415 | 1.26% | ▼9.03 |
| Independent | Narender Singh | 890 | 0.79% | |
| Independent | Rafaqat | 849 | 0.76% | |
| CPI(M) | Sunil | 845 | 0.75% | |
| Margin of victory | | 13,451 | 11.99% | ▼10.34 |
| Turnout | | 1,12,144 | 78.24% | ▲0.94 |
| Registered electors | | 1,43,332 | | ▲4.13 |
| HJC(BL) gain from INC | | Swing | ▼13.46 | |

=== Assembly Election 2005 ===
2005 Haryana Legislative Assembly election: Samalkha
| Party | Candidate | Votes | % | ±% |
|---|---|---|---|---|
| INC | Bharat Singh | 51,767 | 48.65% | ▲19.94 |
| INLD | Katar Singh Chhokar | 28,002 | 26.31% | ▼16.11 |
| Independent | Inder Singh | 12,556 | 11.80% | |
| BJP | Sachdev | 10,957 | 10.30% | |
| Independent | Randhir Singh | 1,124 | 1.06% | |
| NCP | Mitrapal | 643 | 0.60% | |
| Independent | Dilbagh Singh | 554 | 0.52% | |
| Margin of victory | | 23,765 | 22.33% | ▲8.62 |
| Turnout | | 1,06,413 | 77.31% | ▲5.52 |
| Registered electors | | 1,37,653 | | ▲12.76 |
| INC gain from INLD | | Swing | ▲6.23 | |

=== Assembly Election 2000 ===
2000 Haryana Legislative Assembly election: Samalkha
| Party | Candidate | Votes | % | ±% |
|---|---|---|---|---|
| INLD | Kartar Singh Bhadana | 37,174 | 42.42% | |
| INC | Hari Singh Nalwa | 25,159 | 28.71% | ▲15.31 |
| Independent | Surender | 16,722 | 19.08% | |
| BSP | Ramesh Chand | 3,483 | 3.97% | ▼0.1 |
| Independent | Rishi Parkash | 2,343 | 2.67% | |
| NLP | Janeshwar | 723 | 0.83% | |
| Margin of victory | | 12,015 | 13.71% | ▲10.98 |
| Turnout | | 87,633 | 71.79% | ▼0.77 |
| Registered electors | | 1,22,079 | | ▲1.52 |
| INLD gain from HVP | | Swing | ▲19.38 | |

=== Assembly Election 1996 ===
1996 Haryana Legislative Assembly election: Samalkha
| Party | Candidate | Votes | % | ±% |
|---|---|---|---|---|
| HVP | Kartar Singh Bhadana | 20,103 | 23.04% | |
| SAP | Phool Pati | 17,723 | 20.31% | |
| INC | Katar Singh Chhokar | 11,693 | 13.40% | ▼18.43 |
| Independent | Hari Singh Nalwa | 9,313 | 10.67% | |
| SP | Jagdev Singh | 7,496 | 8.59% | |
| Independent | Meena | 7,027 | 8.05% | |
| BSP | Bharat Singh | 3,552 | 4.07% | |
| Independent | Sat Narain | 3,176 | 3.64% | |
| CPI | Mam Chand | 1,800 | 2.06% | |
| AIIC(T) | Shyam Lal Jangra S/O Jai Nand | 1,512 | 1.73% | |
| Independent | Mahender | 1,032 | 1.18% | |
| Margin of victory | | 2,380 | 2.73% | ▲0.26 |
| Turnout | | 87,245 | 76.07% | ▲5.31 |
| Registered electors | | 1,20,249 | | ▲14.49 |
| HVP gain from JD | | Swing | ▼11.26 | |

=== Assembly Election 1991 ===
1991 Haryana Legislative Assembly election: Samalkha
| Party | Candidate | Votes | % | ±% |
|---|---|---|---|---|
| JD | Hari Singh | 24,225 | 34.30% | |
| INC | Katar Singh | 22,479 | 31.83% | ▼1.36 |
| JP | Phool Pati | 19,957 | 28.26% | |
| BJP | Om Prakash | 2,559 | 3.62% | |
| Independent | Jai Paul S/O Devi Ram | 869 | 1.23% | |
| Margin of victory | | 1,746 | 2.47% | ▼4.19 |
| Turnout | | 70,625 | 71.01% | ▼6.55 |
| Registered electors | | 1,05,034 | | ▲8.84 |
| JD gain from LKD | | Swing | ▼5.55 | |

=== Assembly Election 1987 ===
1987 Haryana Legislative Assembly election: Samalkha
| Party | Candidate | Votes | % | ±% |
|---|---|---|---|---|
| LKD | Sachdev | 28,378 | 39.85% | ▲15.29 |
| INC | Hari Singh | 23,633 | 33.19% | ▲1.05 |
| Independent | Katar Singh | 11,710 | 16.45% | |
| Independent | Meena | 1,776 | 2.49% | |
| Independent | Dharam Pal Singh | 1,172 | 1.65% | |
| Independent | Virender Kumar | 1,123 | 1.58% | |
| Independent | Jai Ram | 686 | 0.96% | |
| Independent | Balbir | 615 | 0.86% | |
| Independent | Ranvir Singh | 371 | 0.52% | |
| Independent | Karan Singh | 302 | 0.42% | |
| Independent | Lakhmi | 284 | 0.40% | |
| Margin of victory | | 4,745 | 6.66% | ▼0.91 |
| Turnout | | 71,207 | 75.23% | ▲4.53 |
| Registered electors | | 96,505 | | ▲22.70 |
| LKD gain from INC | | Swing | ▲7.71 | |

=== Assembly Election 1982 ===
1982 Haryana Legislative Assembly election: Samalkha
| Party | Candidate | Votes | % | ±% |
|---|---|---|---|---|
| INC | Katar Singh | 17,507 | 32.14% | ▲13.55 |
| LKD | Mool Chand | 13,380 | 24.56% | |
| Independent | Chuhar Singh | 11,342 | 20.82% | |
| Independent | Hari Singh | 7,361 | 13.51% | |
| CPI | Satya Dev | 2,767 | 5.08% | ▲0.85 |
| JP | Randip | 748 | 1.37% | ▼36.32 |
| Independent | Kishan Chand | 728 | 1.34% | |
| Independent | Phool Pati | 276 | 0.51% | |
| Margin of victory | | 4,127 | 7.58% | ▼11.53 |
| Turnout | | 54,472 | 70.64% | ▲3.62 |
| Registered electors | | 78,653 | | ▲19.59 |
| INC gain from JP | | Swing | ▼5.56 | |

=== Assembly Election 1977 ===
1977 Haryana Legislative Assembly election: Samalkha
| Party | Candidate | Votes | % | ±% |
|---|---|---|---|---|
| JP | Mool Chand | 16,273 | 37.70% | |
| INC | Hari Singh | 8,027 | 18.59% | ▼28.21 |
| Independent | Kartar Singh | 7,017 | 16.25% | |
| Independent | Chuhar Singh | 4,964 | 11.50% | |
| Independent | Mukhtiar Singh | 1,964 | 4.55% | |
| CPI | Raghbir Singh | 1,824 | 4.23% | ▼8.48 |
| Independent | Roop Chand | 1,716 | 3.98% | |
| Independent | Ram Chander Alias Jangli | 668 | 1.55% | |
| Independent | Dharam Pal Singh | 429 | 0.99% | |
| Independent | Tarif Singh | 287 | 0.66% | |
| Margin of victory | | 8,246 | 19.10% | ▲4.85 |
| Turnout | | 43,169 | 66.63% | ▼0.74 |
| Registered electors | | 65,771 | | ▲0.42 |
| JP gain from INC | | Swing | ▼9.11 | |

=== Assembly Election 1972 ===
1972 Haryana Legislative Assembly election: Samalkha
| Party | Candidate | Votes | % | ±% |
|---|---|---|---|---|
| INC | Hari Singh | 20,346 | 46.80% | ▼11.95 |
| INC(O) | Jai Singh | 14,151 | 32.55% | |
| CPI | Raghbir Singh | 5,525 | 12.71% | |
| Independent | Padam Singh | 3,451 | 7.94% | |
| Margin of victory | | 6,195 | 14.25% | ▼14.11 |
| Turnout | | 43,473 | 68.67% | ▲15.76 |
| Registered electors | | 65,496 | | ▲11.39 |
| INC hold | | Swing | ▼11.95 | |

=== Assembly Election 1968 ===
1968 Haryana Legislative Assembly election: Samalkha
| Party | Candidate | Votes | % | ±% |
|---|---|---|---|---|
| INC | Kartar Singh | 17,486 | 58.75% | ▲28.3 |
| ABJS | Dhram Vir | 9,046 | 30.39% | ▼0.34 |
| Independent | Kuldip Singh | 1,395 | 4.69% | |
| BKD | Parma Nand | 782 | 2.63% | |
| Independent | Bharat Singh | 574 | 1.93% | |
| Independent | Sunder | 480 | 1.61% | |
| Margin of victory | | 8,440 | 28.36% | ▲28.07 |
| Turnout | | 29,763 | 52.18% | ▼19.62 |
| Registered electors | | 58,797 | | ▲3.90 |
| INC gain from ABJS | | Swing | ▲28.02 | |

=== Assembly Election 1967 ===
1967 Haryana Legislative Assembly election: Samalkha
| Party | Candidate | Votes | % | ±% |
|---|---|---|---|---|
| ABJS | Randhir | 12,215 | 30.73% | |
| INC | K. Singh | 12,101 | 30.45% | |
| Independent | S. Sunder | 9,327 | 23.47% | |
| RPI | D. Ram | 5,108 | 12.85% | |
| Independent | T. Chand | 995 | 2.50% | |
| Margin of victory | | 114 | 0.29% | |
| Turnout | | 39,746 | 75.64% | |
| Registered electors | | 56,590 | | |
| ABJS win (new seat) | | | | |

== See also ==
- List of constituencies of the Haryana Legislative Assembly
- Panipat district
