= Manmohan Bhadana =

Indian politician

Member of the Haryana Legislative Assembly
- Incumbent
- Assumed office 8 October 2024
- Preceded by: Dharam Singh Chhoker
- Constituency: Samalkha

Personal details
- Party: Bharatiya Janata Party
- Parent: Kartar Singh Bhadana(Father)
- Profession: Politician

Manmohan Bhadana is an Indian politician from Haryana. He is a Member of the Haryana Legislative Assembly from 2024, representing Samalkha Assembly constituency as a Member of the Bharatiya Janata Party.

== See also ==
- 2024 Haryana Legislative Assembly election
- Haryana Legislative Assembly
