= Kosli Assembly constituency =

Legislative Assembly constituency in Haryana State, India

Coordinates: 28.41°N 76.48°E

Kosli
- Constituency No. 73 for the Haryana Legislative Assembly

Constituency details
- Country: India
- Region: North India
- State: Haryana
- Division: Gurgaon
- District: Rewari
- Lok Sabha constituency: Rohtak
- Total electors: 2,54,470
- Reservation: None

Member of Legislative Assembly
- 15th Haryana Legislative Assembly
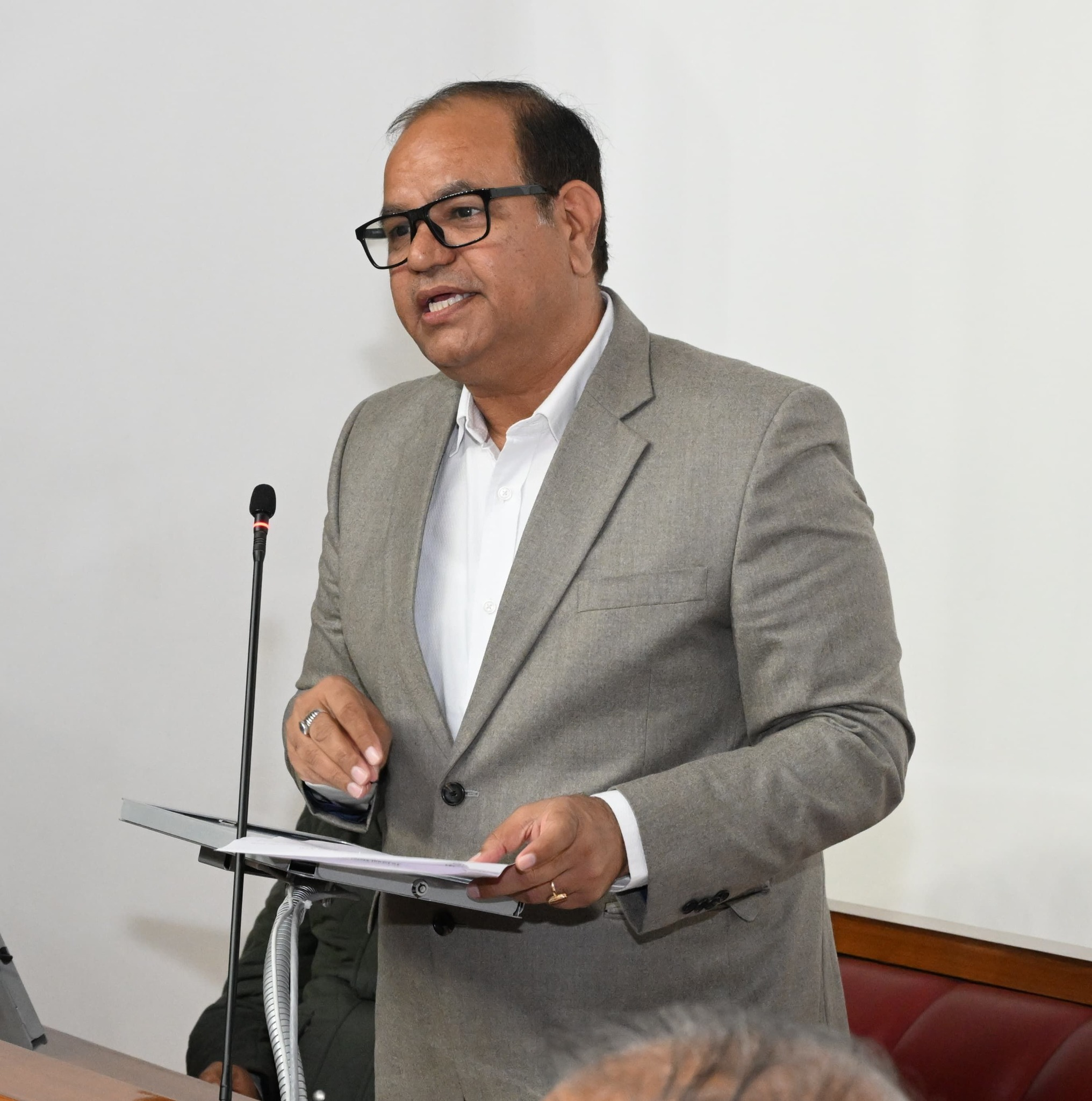
- Incumbent Rao Anil Dahina
- Party: Bharatiya Janata Party
- Elected year: 2024

Kosli Assembly constituency is one of the 90 Legislative Assembly constituencies of Haryana state in India.

It is part of Rewari district.

== Members of the Legislative Assembly ==
Year	Member	Party
Till 2009: Constituency did not exist
2009	Rao Yadavender Singh	Indian National Congress
2014	Bikram Singh Thekedar	Bharatiya Janata Party
2019	Laxman Singh Yadav	Bharatiya Janata Party
2024	Rao Anil Dahina	Bharatiya Janata Party

== Election results ==
=== Assembly Election 2024 ===
2024 Haryana Legislative Assembly election: Kosli
Party	Candidate	Votes	%	±%
BJP	Rao Anil Dahina	92,185	51.76%	▼0.66
INC	Jagdish Yadav	74,976	42.10%	▲15.36
Independent	Manoj Koslia	7,302	4.10%	New
NOTA	None of the Above	715	0.40%	New
Margin of victory		17,209	9.66%	▼16.03
Turnout		1,78,111	71.29%	▲8.57
Registered electors		2,54,470		▲4.23
BJP hold		Swing	▼0.66	

=== Assembly Election 2019 ===
2019 Haryana Legislative Assembly election: Kosli
Party	Candidate	Votes	%	±%
BJP	Laxman Singh Yadav	78,813	52.42%	▲13.11
INC	Rao Yaduvender Singh	40,189	26.73%	▲14.60
JJP	Ramphal S/Richhpal	15,941	10.60%	New
BSP	Dr. Ajit Singh Chahal	3,612	2.40%	▲1.68
Independent	Jagphool	3,219	2.14%	New
INLD	Kiran Pal Yadav	2,322	1.54%	▼31.07
Swaraj India	Dharampal	1,517	1.01%	New
SUCI(C)	Ramphal Bhakli S/Sher Singh	871	0.58%	New
LSP	Babu Lal	847	0.56%	New
Sarva Hit Party	Vinod Kumari	788	0.52%	New
Margin of victory		38,624	25.69%	▲19.00
Turnout		1,50,349	62.72%	▼12.35
Registered electors		2,39,722		▲11.82
BJP hold		Swing	▲13.11	

=== Assembly Election 2014 ===
2014 Haryana Legislative Assembly election: Kosli
Party	Candidate	Votes	%	±%
BJP	Bikram Singh Thekedar	63,264	39.31%	▲36.41
INLD	Jagdish Yadav	52,497	32.62%	▲17.87
INC	Rao Yaduvender Singh	19,527	12.13%	▼25.31
Independent	Vijay Bhurthala	16,564	10.29%	New
Independent	Dr. Mahesh Kumar	3,623	2.25%	New
HJC(BL)	Manoj Yadav	1,339	0.83%	▼1.50
BSP	Naveen Kumar	1,168	0.73%	▼2.76
Margin of victory		10,767	6.69%	▲4.01
Turnout		1,60,941	75.07%	▲5.87
Registered electors		2,14,387		▲15.97
BJP gain from INC		Swing	▲1.87	

=== Assembly Election 2009 ===
2009 Haryana Legislative Assembly election: Kosli
Party	Candidate	Votes	%	±%
INC	Rao Yaduvender Singh	47,896	37.44%	New
Independent	Jagdish Yadav	44,473	34.76%	New
INLD	Satish Khola	18,862	14.74%	New
BSP	Kamalveer Singh	4,464	3.49%	New
BJP	Anil Yadav	3,713	2.90%	New
HJC(BL)	Mohit	2,987	2.33%	New
Independent	Comrade Rajender Singh	954	0.75%	New
Independent	Nihal Singh	936	0.73%	New
NCP	Suresh	733	0.57%	New
SP	Ramesh	693	0.54%	New
Margin of victory		3,423	2.68%	
Turnout		1,27,930	69.20%	
Registered electors		1,84,860		
INC win (new seat)				

== See also ==
- List of constituencies of the Haryana Legislative Assembly
- Rewari district
