= Guhla Assembly constituency =

Legislative Assembly constituency in Haryana State, India

Coordinates: 30.04°N 76.3°E

Guhla
- Constituency No. 15 for the Haryana Legislative Assembly

Constituency details
- Country: India
- Region: North India
- State: Haryana
- District: Kaithal
- Lok Sabha constituency: Kurukshetra
- Total electors: 1,92,126
- Reservation: SC

Member of Legislative Assembly
- 15th Haryana Legislative Assembly
- Incumbent Devender Hans
- Party: Indian National Congress
- Elected year: 2024

Guhla is one of the 94 Legislative Assembly constituencies of Haryana state in India.

It is part of Kaithal district and is reserved for candidates belonging to the Scheduled Castes.

== Members of the Legislative Assembly ==
Year	Member	Party
1977	Ishwar Singh	Janata Party
1982	Dilu Ram	Lokdal
1987	Buta Singh	Lokdal
1991	Amar Singh	Janata Party
1996	Dillu Ram	Indian National Congress
2000	Amar Singh	Indian National Lok Dal
2005	Dillu Ram	Indian National Congress
2009	Phool Singh	Indian National Lok Dal
2014	Kulwant Ram Bazigar	Bharatiya Janata Party
2019	Ishwar Singh	Jannayak Janta Party
2024	Devender Hans	Indian National Congress

== Election results ==
=== Assembly Election 2024 ===
2024 Haryana Legislative Assembly election: Guhla
Party	Candidate	Votes	%	±%
INC	Devender Hans	64,611	48.26%	▲23.93
BJP	Kulwant Ram Bazigar	41,731	31.17%	▲11.97
Independent	Naresh Kumar	12,437	9.29%	New
JJP	Krishan Kumar	5,768	4.31%	▼23.51
AAP	Rakesh Kumar	4,540	3.39%	▲2.83
INLD	Poonam Rani	2,409	1.80%	New
Independent	Amarjeet Singh	1,051	0.79%	New
NOTA	None of the Above	702	0.52%	▼0.08
Margin of victory		22,880	17.09%	▲13.61
Turnout		1,33,876	69.60%	▼3.25
Registered electors		1,92,126		▲6.74
INC gain from JJP		Swing	▲20.45	

=== Assembly Election 2019 ===
2019 Haryana Legislative Assembly election: Guhla
Party	Candidate	Votes	%	±%
JJP	Ishwar Singh	36,518	27.82%	
INC	Chaudhary Dilu Ram	31,944	24.33%	−1.52%
Independent	Devender Hans	29,473	22.45%	
BJP	Para Ram Alias Ravi Taranwali	25,203	19.20%	−8.51%
SAD	Ram Kumar Valmiki	3,555	2.71%	
Shiromani Akali Dal (Amritsar) (Simranjit Singh Mann)	Bhupinder Singh	806	0.61%	
NOTA	Nota	790	0.60%	−0.22%
AAP	Pinky Bhukal Kamboj	737	0.56%	
Margin of victory		4,574	3.48%	1.64%
Turnout		1,31,282	72.85%	−8.12%
Registered electors		1,80,209		10.45%
JJP gain from BJP		Swing	0.11%	

=== Assembly Election 2014 ===
2014 Haryana Legislative Assembly election: Guhla
Party	Candidate	Votes	%	±%
BJP	Kulwant Ram Bazigar	36,598	27.70%	26.32%
INC	Dillu Ram	34,158	25.86%	−2.81%
INLD	Buta Singh	32,334	24.48%	−8.93%
Independent	Rekha Rani	19,946	15.10%	
HJC(BL)	Naresh Kumar	2,823	2.14%	−10.10%
Independent	Rameshwar Dass	2,350	1.78%	
NOTA	None of the Above	1,079	0.82%	
BSP	Dalbir Singh	775	0.59%	−2.11%
Margin of victory		2,440	1.85%	−2.89%
Turnout		1,32,105	80.97%	3.99%
Registered electors		1,63,160		13.36%
BJP gain from INLD		Swing	-5.71%	

=== Assembly Election 2009 ===
2009 Haryana Legislative Assembly election: Guhla
Party	Candidate	Votes	%	±%
INLD	Phool Singh	37,016	33.41%	−8.72%
INC	Dillu Ram S/O Fauja Ram	31,763	28.67%	−22.86%
Independent	Kulwant Ram Bazigar	20,926	18.89%	
HJC(BL)	Naresh Kumar	13,557	12.24%	
BSP	Ram Kumar	2,987	2.70%	1.38%
BJP	Ghanshyam	1,532	1.38%	−0.80%
CPI(M)	Randhir Singh Sathi	976	0.88%	
Independent	Ramesh Kumar	943	0.85%	
Independent	Dillu Ram S/O Sant Ram	575	0.52%	
Margin of victory		5,253	4.74%	−4.66%
Turnout		1,10,792	76.98%	0.32%
Registered electors		1,43,929		2.47%
INLD gain from INC		Swing	-18.12%	

=== Assembly Election 2005 ===
2005 Haryana Legislative Assembly election: Guhla
Party	Candidate	Votes	%	±%
INC	Dillu Ram	55,487	51.53%	11.46%
INLD	Buta Singh	45,360	42.13%	−14.42%
BJP	Shamsher Singh	2,349	2.18%	
BSP	Ramdass	1,413	1.31%	−0.76%
BRP	Chamel Singh	1,333	1.24%	
Independent	Buta Ram	965	0.90%	
NCP	Rakesh	706	0.66%	
Margin of victory		10,127	9.41%	−7.07%
Turnout		1,07,671	76.65%	6.92%
Registered electors		1,40,466		6.88%
INC gain from INLD		Swing	-5.02%	

=== Assembly Election 2000 ===
2000 Haryana Legislative Assembly election: Guhla
Party	Candidate	Votes	%	±%
INLD	Amar Singh	51,402	56.55%	
INC	Dilu Ram	36,428	40.08%	4.33%
BSP	Kanwar Bhan	1,886	2.07%	1.21%
HVP	Jogi Ram	801	0.88%	−26.04%
Margin of victory		14,974	16.47%	13.58%
Turnout		90,895	69.74%	−8.80%
Registered electors		1,31,421		3.08%
INLD gain from INC		Swing	10.05%	

=== Assembly Election 1996 ===
1996 Haryana Legislative Assembly election: Guhla
Party	Candidate	Votes	%	±%
INC	Dillu Ram	34,385	35.75%	−6.46%
SAP	Amar Singh	31,599	32.85%	
HVP	Ishwar Singh	25,894	26.92%	23.59%
BSP	Buta Ram	835	0.87%	
CPI(M)	Chandan Ram	793	0.82%	
AIIC(T)	Tej Pal	515	0.54%	
Margin of victory		2,786	2.90%	−1.40%
Turnout		96,188	78.54%	6.18%
Registered electors		1,27,490		18.28%
INC gain from JP		Swing	-10.76%	

=== Assembly Election 1991 ===
1991 Haryana Legislative Assembly election: Guhla
Party	Candidate	Votes	%	±%
JP	Amar Singh	34,990	46.50%	
INC	Dillu Ram	31,760	42.21%	22.18%
BJP	Deva Ram	3,832	5.09%	
HVP	Jogi Ram	2,506	3.33%	
Independent	Om Parkash	1,120	1.49%	
Margin of victory		3,230	4.29%	−33.42%
Turnout		75,242	72.36%	−1.30%
Registered electors		1,07,790		10.91%
JP gain from LKD		Swing	-11.24%	

=== Assembly Election 1987 ===
1987 Haryana Legislative Assembly election: Guhla
Party	Candidate	Votes	%	±%
LKD	Buta Singh	40,772	57.74%	13.93%
INC	Dilu Ram	14,145	20.03%	−16.59%
Independent	Ishwar Singh	13,535	19.17%	
Independent	Roshan Lal	849	1.20%	
Independent	Ram Dia	284	0.40%	
Margin of victory		26,627	37.71%	30.52%
Turnout		70,610	73.66%	3.54%
Registered electors		97,187		23.26%
LKD hold		Swing	13.93%	

=== Assembly Election 1982 ===
1982 Haryana Legislative Assembly election: Guhla
Party	Candidate	Votes	%	±%
LKD	Dilu Ram	23,788	43.81%	
INC	Ran Singh	19,884	36.62%	29.57%
Independent	Jogi Ram Alias Jogi Dass	3,218	5.93%	
CPI(M)	Amrit Lal	2,697	4.97%	1.94%
Independent	Sodagar	2,465	4.54%	
Independent	Om Parkash Madia	696	1.28%	
Independent	Ram Diya	589	1.08%	
JP	Swarn Singh	482	0.89%	−57.05%
Independent	Ram Asra	474	0.87%	
Margin of victory		3,904	7.19%	−36.68%
Turnout		54,293	70.12%	12.74%
Registered electors		78,848		24.21%
LKD gain from JP		Swing	-14.13%	

=== Assembly Election 1977 ===
1977 Haryana Legislative Assembly election: Guhla
Party	Candidate	Votes	%	±%
JP	Ishwar Singh	20,824	57.94%	
Independent	Sant Ram	5,057	14.07%	
Independent	Jaga Ram	3,345	9.31%	
INC	Gulzar Singh	2,534	7.05%	
Independent	Vijay Kumar	1,536	4.27%	
CPI(M)	Amrit	1,089	3.03%	
Independent	Raj Kumar Alias Ram Kumar	537	1.49%	
Independent	Garibu	510	1.42%	
Independent	Bhim	508	1.41%	
Margin of victory		15,767	43.87%	
Turnout		35,940	57.38%	
Registered electors		63,480		
JP win (new seat)				

== See also ==
- List of constituencies of the Haryana Legislative Assembly
- Kaithal district
