= Thanesar Assembly constituency =

Legislative Assembly constituency in Haryana State, India

Coordinates: 29.97°N 76.82°E

Thanesar
- Constituency No. 13 for the Haryana Legislative Assembly

Constituency details
- Country: India
- Region: North India
- State: Haryana
- District: Kurukshetra
- Lok Sabha constituency: Kurukshetra
- Total electors: 2,17,381
- Reservation: None

Member of Legislative Assembly
- 15th Haryana Legislative Assembly
- Incumbent Ashok Kumar Arora
- Party: Indian National Congress
- Elected year: 2024

Thanesar Assembly constituency is one of the 90 Legislative Assembly constituencies of Haryana state in India.

It is part of Kurukshetra district.

== Members of the Legislative Assembly ==
Year	Member	Party
1967	D. Prakash	Indian National Congress
1968	Om Parkash	Indian National Congress
1972	Om Parkash	Indian National Congress
1977	Devendra Sharma	Janata Party
1982	Sahab Singh Saini	Lokdal
1987	Gurdial Singh Saini	Lokdal
1989^	Devendra Sharma	Indian National Congress
1991	Ram Parkash	Indian National Congress
1996	Ashok Arora	Samata Party
2000	Ashok Arora	Indian National Lok Dal
2005	Ramesh Gupta	Indian National Congress
2009	Ashok Arora	Indian National Lok Dal
2014	Subhash Sudha	Bharatiya Janata Party
2019	Subhash Sudha	Bharatiya Janata Party
2024	Ashok Arora	Indian National Congress

== Election results ==
=== Assembly Election 2024 ===
2024 Haryana Legislative Assembly election: Thanesar
Party	Candidate	Votes	%	±%
INC	Ashok Kumar Arora	70,076	48.93%	▲6.55
BJP	Subhash Sudha	66,833	46.67%	▲3.63
AAP	Krishan Bajaj	2,948	2.06%	New
BSP	Tanuja	1,709	1.19%	▲0.02
NOTA	None of the Above	798	0.56%	▼0.18
Margin of victory		3,243	2.26%	▲1.61
Turnout		1,43,212	65.57%	▼1.56
Registered electors		2,17,381		▲13.16
INC gain from BJP		Swing	▲5.90	

=== Assembly Election 2019 ===
2019 Haryana Legislative Assembly election: Thanesar
Party	Candidate	Votes	%	±%
BJP	Subhash Sudha	55,759	43.03%	−9.83%
INC	Ashok Kumar	54,917	42.38%	31.69%
Independent	Parveen Choudhary	11,939	9.21%	
JJP	Yogesh Kumar	2,012	1.55%	
BSP	Naveen Kumar	1,519	1.17%	0.47%
NOTA	Nota	951	0.73%	0.23%
INLD	Kalawati	734	0.57%	−32.39%
Margin of victory		842	0.65%	−19.26%
Turnout		1,29,573	67.13%	−8.42%
Registered electors		1,93,017		13.25%
BJP hold		Swing	-9.83%	

=== Assembly Election 2014 ===
2014 Haryana Legislative Assembly election: Thanesar
Party	Candidate	Votes	%	±%
BJP	Subhash Sudha	68,080	52.87%	49.05%
INLD	Ashok Kumar	42,442	32.96%	0.14%
INC	Pawan Garg	13,769	10.69%	−12.92%
HJCPV	Rajesh Sharma	1,017	0.79%	
BSP	Ashwani Malhotra	909	0.71%	−4.12%
NOTA	None of the Above	655	0.51%	
Margin of victory		25,638	19.91%	10.70%
Turnout		1,28,775	75.56%	1.99%
Registered electors		1,70,438		39.42%
BJP gain from INLD		Swing	20.05%	

=== Assembly Election 2009 ===
2009 Haryana Legislative Assembly election: Thanesar
Party	Candidate	Votes	%	±%
INLD	Ashok Kumar	29,516	32.82%	−2.33%
INC	Ramesh Gupta	21,231	23.61%	−24.24%
Independent	Subhash Sudha	17,025	18.93%	
HJC(BL)	Balkar Singh	12,323	13.70%	
BSP	Devendra Sharma	4,339	4.82%	3.27%
BJP	Krishan Bajaj	3,437	3.82%	−7.04%
Independent	Ramesh Kumar	606	0.67%	
Margin of victory		8,285	9.21%	−3.48%
Turnout		89,929	73.57%	−0.33%
Registered electors		1,22,244		−22.44%
INLD gain from INC		Swing	-15.03%	

=== Assembly Election 2005 ===
2005 Haryana Legislative Assembly election: Thanesar
Party	Candidate	Votes	%	±%
INC	Ramesh Kumar	55,729	47.85%	14.23%
INLD	Ashok Kumar	40,943	35.15%	−13.49%
BJP	Gurdial Singh Saini	12,656	10.87%	
BSP	Harpal Singh	1,814	1.56%	0.29%
BRP	Sutender Gaur	1,431	1.23%	
CPI	Som Nath	1,326	1.14%	
Independent	Bal Singh	934	0.80%	
Independent	Govind Ram	821	0.70%	
Margin of victory		14,786	12.70%	−2.33%
Turnout		1,16,465	73.89%	4.37%
Registered electors		1,57,609		19.26%
INC gain from INLD		Swing	-0.79%	

=== Assembly Election 2000 ===
2000 Haryana Legislative Assembly election: Thanesar
Party	Candidate	Votes	%	±%
INLD	Ashok Kumar	44,678	48.64%	
INC	Shashi Saini	30,877	33.62%	20.80%
HVP	Kaka Jatinder Singh	11,494	12.51%	−5.40%
Independent	Bashir Ahmed Khan	1,446	1.57%	
BSP	Kamlesh Dhiman	1,166	1.27%	−0.47%
SP	Om Parkash	829	0.90%	
NCP	Ram Kumar Moudgil	516	0.56%	
Independent	Karnail Singh Saini	502	0.55%	
Margin of victory		13,801	15.03%	9.97%
Turnout		91,847	69.52%	−6.83%
Registered electors		1,32,154		−2.34%
INLD gain from SAP		Swing	14.99%	

=== Assembly Election 1996 ===
1996 Haryana Legislative Assembly election: Thanesar
Party	Candidate	Votes	%	±%
SAP	Ashok Kumar	25,175	25.57%	
Independent	Ramesh Kumar	20,200	20.51%	
HVP	Sahab Singh	17,640	17.91%	−2.80%
INC	Pawan Garg	12,626	12.82%	−20.83%
AIIC(T)	Ram Parkash	11,068	11.24%	
Independent	Siri Parkash Mishra	5,248	5.33%	
JD	Kulwant Singh Saini	1,731	1.76%	
BSP	Baldev Singh Saini	1,714	1.74%	−0.45%
Independent	Subhash Chand	1,461	1.48%	
Margin of victory		4,975	5.05%	−3.22%
Turnout		98,471	76.35%	8.97%
Registered electors		1,35,322		21.78%
SAP gain from INC		Swing	-8.08%	

=== Assembly Election 1991 ===
1991 Haryana Legislative Assembly election: Thanesar
Party	Candidate	Votes	%	±%
INC	Ram Parkash	24,471	33.65%	
JP	Ashok Kumar	18,458	25.38%	
HVP	Sahab Singh	15,064	20.71%	
BJP	Atam Parkash	10,477	14.41%	
BSP	Ram Kumar	1,590	2.19%	
Independent	Manga Ram	943	1.30%	
Independent	Dharam Pal	445	0.61%	
Margin of victory		6,013	8.27%	
Turnout		72,722	67.38%	
Registered electors		1,11,123		
INC hold		Swing		

=== Assembly By-election 1989 ===
1989 Haryana Legislative Assembly by-election: Thanesar
Party	Candidate	Votes	%	±%
INC	D. Sharma	30,414		
JD	A. Kumar S/O M.Raj	30,290		
Independent	F. Chand	396		
Independent	R. Singh	345		
Independent	R. Lal	285		
Independent	R. Nath	234		
Independent	Deba	154		
Independent	R. Pal	144		
Independent	N. Ram	143		
Independent	S. Mohan	135		
Independent	K. Singh	94		
Margin of victory		124		
INC gain from LKD		Swing		

=== Assembly Election 1987 ===
1987 Haryana Legislative Assembly election: Thanesar
Party	Candidate	Votes	%	±%
LKD	Gurdial Singh	35,585	55.16%	11.93%
INC	Sahab Singh	12,961	20.09%	−19.00%
Independent	Nathi Ram	3,924	6.08%	
Independent	Bhim Chawla	3,798	5.89%	
Independent	Krishna Kumar Bajaj	3,383	5.24%	
JP	Phool Chand Goyal	2,416	3.75%	−8.41%
Independent	Des Raj	776	1.20%	
Margin of victory		22,624	35.07%	30.93%
Turnout		64,507	69.30%	−2.77%
Registered electors		94,239		25.98%
LKD hold		Swing	11.93%	

=== Assembly Election 1982 ===
1982 Haryana Legislative Assembly election: Thanesar
Party	Candidate	Votes	%	±%
LKD	Sahab Singh	22,893	43.23%	
INC	Om Parkash	20,698	39.09%	9.17%
JP	Phool Chand	6,437	12.16%	−57.03%
Independent	Rameshwar Dass	1,188	2.24%	
Independent	Durga Prashad	500	0.94%	
Independent	Chuhar Singh	405	0.76%	
Independent	Kura	390	0.74%	
Margin of victory		2,195	4.15%	−35.13%
Turnout		52,951	72.06%	1.55%
Registered electors		74,802		28.82%
LKD gain from JP		Swing	-25.96%	

=== Assembly Election 1977 ===
1977 Haryana Legislative Assembly election: Thanesar
Party	Candidate	Votes	%	±%
JP	Devendra Sharma	28,044	69.19%	
INC	Om Prakash	12,126	29.92%	−18.05%
Independent	Amar Nath	202	0.50%	
Margin of victory		15,918	39.27%	34.16%
Turnout		40,532	70.52%	−5.39%
Registered electors		58,068		−0.47%
JP gain from INC		Swing	21.22%	

=== Assembly Election 1972 ===
1972 Haryana Legislative Assembly election: Thanesar
Party	Candidate	Votes	%	±%
INC	Om Parkash	20,657	47.96%	−0.09%
ABJS	Ram Saran Das	18,454	42.85%	−3.93%
Independent	Muthra	2,189	5.08%	
INC(O)	Mihan Singh	1,584	3.68%	
Independent	Ishak Lal	183	0.42%	
Margin of victory		2,203	5.12%	3.84%
Turnout		43,067	75.91%	15.48%
Registered electors		58,342		13.85%
INC hold		Swing	-0.09%	

=== Assembly Election 1968 ===
1968 Haryana Legislative Assembly election: Thanesar
Party	Candidate	Votes	%	±%
INC	Om Parkash	14,473	48.05%	−4.43%
ABJS	Ram Saran Das	14,089	46.78%	5.08%
RPI	Krishan Chand	1,558	5.17%	
Margin of victory		384	1.27%	−9.52%
Turnout		30,120	60.42%	−17.15%
Registered electors		51,244		5.24%
INC hold		Swing	-4.43%	

=== Assembly Election 1967 ===
1967 Haryana Legislative Assembly election: Thanesar
Party	Candidate	Votes	%	±%
INC	D. Prakash	18,659	52.49%	
ABJS	B. Singh	14,822	41.69%	
Independent	K. Ram	843	2.37%	
Independent	A. Ram	793	2.23%	
SSP	S. Sawarup	434	1.22%	
Margin of victory		3,837	10.79%	
Turnout		35,551	77.57%	
Registered electors		48,691		
INC win (new seat)				

== See also ==
- List of constituencies of the Haryana Legislative Assembly
- Kurukshetra district
