= Nilokheri Assembly constituency =

Legislative Assembly constituency in Haryana State, India

Coordinates: 29.84°N 76.93°E

- Constituency No. 19 for the Haryana Legislative Assembly

Constituency details
- Country: India
- Region: North India
- State: Haryana
- District: Karnal
- Lok Sabha constituency: Karnal
- Total electors: 2,33,546
- Reservation: SC

Member of Legislative Assembly
- 15th Haryana Legislative Assembly
- Incumbent Bhagwan Das KabirPanthi
- Party: Bharatiya Janata Party

Nilokheri is one of the 90 Legislative Assembly constituencies of Haryana state in India.

It is part of Karnal district and is reserved for candidates belonging to the Scheduled Castes.

== Members of the Legislative Assembly ==
Year	Member	Party
1967	Shiv Ram	Bharatiya Jana Sangh
1968	Chanda Singh	Independent
1972	Shiv Ram	Bharatiya Jana Sangh
1977	Shiv Ram	Janata Party
1982	Chanda Singh	Independent
1987	Jai Singh Rana	Independent
1991	Jai Singh Rana	Independent
1996	Jai Singh Rana	Indian National Congress
2000	Dharm Pal	Indian National Lok Dal
2005	Jai Singh Rana	Indian National Congress
2009	Mamu Ram	Indian National Lok Dal
2014	Bhagwan Das KabirPanthi	Bharatiya Janata Party
2019	Dharam Pal Gonder	Independent politician
2024	Bhagwan Das KabirPanthi	Bharatiya Janata Party

== Election results ==
=== Assembly Election 2024 ===
2024 Haryana Legislative Assembly election: Nilokheri
Party	Candidate	Votes	%	±%
BJP	Bhagwan Das KabirPanthi	77,902	52.34%	▲21.97
INC	Dharam Pal Gonder	59,057	39.68%	▲24.97
Independent	Raj Kumar	5,470	3.68%	New
INLD	Balwan Singh	2,145	1.44%	New
Rashtrawadi Janlok Party (Satya)	Gaurav Bakhshi	1,378	0.93%	New
NOTA	None of the Above	345	0.23%	▼0.37
Margin of victory		18,845	12.66%	▲11.01
Turnout		1,48,838	63.74%	▲1.27
Registered electors		2,33,546		▲8.69
BJP gain from Independent		Swing	▲20.32	

=== Assembly Election 2019 ===
2019 Haryana Legislative Assembly election: Nilokheri
Party	Candidate	Votes	%	±%
Independent	Dharam Pal Gonder	42,979	32.02%	New
BJP	Bhagwan Das KabirPanthi	40,757	30.37%	▼11.56
INC	Banta Ram	19,736	14.71%	▼2.01
JJP	Bhim Singh Jalala	11,278	8.40%	New
Rashtriya Janta Party	Aruna	7,067	5.27%	New
BSP	Mukesh Kumar Grover	5,136	3.83%	▼2.65
Independent	Dharmveer	2,291	1.71%	New
Bhartiya Jan Samman Party	Sharvan Kumar	996	0.74%	New
INLD	Sonika Gill	947	0.71%	▼16.50
NOTA	Nota	804	0.60%	New
Independent	Jaswant Singh	801	0.60%	New
Margin of victory		2,222	1.66%	▼23.07
Turnout		1,34,210	62.47%	▼12.10
Registered electors		2,14,843		▲15.12
Independent gain from BJP		Swing	▼9.90	

=== Assembly Election 2014 ===
2014 Haryana Legislative Assembly election: Nilokheri
Party	Candidate	Votes	%	±%
BJP	Bhagwan Das KabirPanthi	58,354	41.93%	▲37.39
INLD	Mamu Ram	23,944	17.20%	▼27.29
INC	Gian Sahota	23,257	16.71%	▼11.95
Independent	Sushma Chauhan	15,356	11.03%	New
BSP	Aruna	9,014	6.48%	▲0.89
Independent	Gian Chand	2,987	2.15%	New
HJC(BL)	Nafe Singh	2,965	2.13%	▲0.32
Margin of victory		34,410	24.72%	▲8.89
Turnout		1,39,175	74.57%	▲6.93
Registered electors		1,86,633		▲19.51
BJP gain from INLD		Swing	▼2.57	

=== Assembly Election 2009 ===
2009 Haryana Legislative Assembly election: Nilokheri
Party	Candidate	Votes	%	±%
INLD	Mamu Ram	47,001	44.50%	▲32.00
INC	Meena Rani	30,278	28.66%	▼9.36
Independent	Gian Chand	7,115	6.74%	New
BSP	Sher Singh	5,900	5.59%	▲1.39
BJP	Dharam Pal Gonder	4,793	4.54%	▼21.06
BRP	Jai Singh Arjaheri	3,994	3.78%	▼14.51
Independent	Bhagwan Das KabirPanthi	2,308	2.19%	New
HJC(BL)	Geeta	1,916	1.81%	New
Independent	Lakhmi Chand	597	0.57%	New
Margin of victory		16,723	15.83%	▲3.41
Turnout		1,05,629	67.64%	▼11.91
Registered electors		1,56,170		▲24.54
INLD gain from INC		Swing	▲6.47	

=== Assembly Election 2005 ===
2005 Haryana Legislative Assembly election: Nilokheri
Party	Candidate	Votes	%	±%
INC	Jai Singh Rana	37,931	38.03%	▼2.40
BJP	Bakshish Singh	25,537	25.60%	New
BRP	Maratha Virender Verma	18,244	18.29%	New
INLD	Rajinder Singh	12,465	12.50%	▼38.90
BSP	Jai Bhagwan Jangra	4,182	4.19%	▲2.72
Independent	Shish Pal	666	0.67%	New
Margin of victory		12,394	12.43%	▲1.45
Turnout		99,750	79.55%	▲6.27
Registered electors		1,25,399		▲9.02
INC gain from INLD		Swing	▼13.37	

=== Assembly Election 2000 ===
2000 Haryana Legislative Assembly election: Nilokheri
Party	Candidate	Votes	%	±%
INLD	Dharm Pal	43,326	51.40%	New
INC	Jai Singh	34,072	40.42%	▲4.40
Independent	Man Singh	5,076	6.02%	New
BSP	Som Dutt Munde	1,240	1.47%	▼5.55
HVP	Rishi Pal	577	0.68%	▼9.22
Margin of victory		9,254	10.98%	▲0.03
Turnout		84,291	73.28%	▼2.53
Registered electors		1,15,029		▼0.40
INLD gain from INC		Swing	▲15.38	

=== Assembly Election 1996 ===
1996 Haryana Legislative Assembly election: Nilokheri
Party	Candidate	Votes	%	±%
INC	Jai Singh	31,536	36.02%	▲23.90
SAP	Bakshish Singh	21,954	25.08%	New
Independent	Rajinder Singh	12,881	14.71%	New
HVP	Chanda Singh	8,673	9.91%	▲2.64
BSP	Amarjit	6,146	7.02%	New
Independent	Rattan Lal	2,039	2.33%	New
JD	Surendar	1,065	1.22%	New
Independent	Ranjit Singh	843	0.96%	New
AIIC(T)	Ashwani	629	0.72%	New
Margin of victory		9,582	10.95%	▼7.47
Turnout		87,546	78.67%	▲5.49
Registered electors		1,15,489		▲16.65
INC gain from Independent		Swing	▲1.40	

=== Assembly Election 1991 ===
1991 Haryana Legislative Assembly election: Nilokheri
Party	Candidate	Votes	%	±%
Independent	Jai Singh	24,099	34.62%	New
JP	Ishwar Singh	11,280	16.20%	New
INC	Parkash Vir	8,442	12.13%	▲0.20
Independent	Chanda Singh	6,883	9.89%	New
HVP	Rajender Singh	5,056	7.26%	New
BJP	Amar Singh	4,682	6.73%	New
Independent	Madan Lal	3,029	4.35%	New
Independent	Gurmukh Singh	2,825	4.06%	New
Independent	Suresh Kumar	1,709	2.45%	New
Independent	Om Sukh Lal	654	0.94%	New
Margin of victory		12,819	18.41%	▲12.91
Turnout		69,614	73.47%	▼3.89
Registered electors		99,001		▲9.67
Independent hold		Swing	▲8.11	

=== Assembly Election 1987 ===
1987 Haryana Legislative Assembly election: Nilokheri
Party	Candidate	Votes	%	±%
Independent	Jai Singh	17,757	26.51%	New
LKD	Devi Singh	14,071	21.01%	New
INC	Chanda Singh	7,988	11.93%	▼17.85
Independent	Shiv Ram	7,792	11.63%	New
Independent	Gurmukh Singh	7,733	11.54%	New
Independent	Ram Kishan	4,081	6.09%	New
Independent	Daljit Singh	1,923	2.87%	New
Independent	Rishi Pal	1,592	2.38%	New
Independent	Prithvi Singh	1,554	2.32%	New
Independent	Lajpat Rai Chada	715	1.07%	New
Independent	Chandgi Ram	654	0.98%	New
Margin of victory		3,686	5.50%	▼1.84
Turnout		66,984	75.19%	▲3.95
Registered electors		90,269		▲24.69
Independent hold		Swing	▼10.60	

=== Assembly Election 1982 ===
1982 Haryana Legislative Assembly election: Nilokheri
Party	Candidate	Votes	%	±%
Independent	Chanda Singh	18,874	37.11%	New
INC	Shiv Ram	15,141	29.77%	▲18.79
BJP	Shyam Dass	9,972	19.61%	New
Independent	Ram Kishan	3,466	6.82%	New
Independent	Jagmohan	1,243	2.44%	New
Independent	Bhupinder Singh	1,045	2.05%	New
JP	Balwinder Jeet Singh	572	1.12%	▼39.70
Margin of victory		3,733	7.34%	▼14.80
Turnout		50,857	71.56%	▲0.65
Registered electors		72,394		▲21.33
Independent gain from JP		Swing	▼3.71	

=== Assembly Election 1977 ===
1977 Haryana Legislative Assembly election: Nilokheri
Party	Candidate	Votes	%	±%
JP	Shiv Ram	16,953	40.82%	New
Independent	Daljit Singh	7,757	18.68%	New
Independent	Om Prakash	5,576	13.43%	New
INC	Jagir Singh	4,560	10.98%	▼16.11
Independent	Chanda Singh	4,209	10.14%	New
Independent	Prithvi Singh	1,332	3.21%	New
Independent	Bhartu Ram	624	1.50%	New
Independent	Bhupinder Singh	343	0.83%	New
Margin of victory		9,196	22.14%	▲21.27
Turnout		41,529	70.58%	▼5.20
Registered electors		59,669		▲15.96
JP gain from ABJS		Swing	▲12.85	

=== Assembly Election 1972 ===
1972 Haryana Legislative Assembly election: Nilokheri
Party	Candidate	Votes	%	±%
ABJS	Shib Ram	10,764	27.97%	▲6.31
INC	Chanda Singh	10,428	27.09%	▼1.30
Independent	Harbhajan Singh	6,677	17.35%	New
Independent	Mansa Ram	2,836	7.37%	New
Independent	Harbans Lal	2,326	6.04%	New
Independent	Giani	1,968	5.11%	New
Independent	Anup Gir	1,950	5.07%	New
Independent	Kishana Chand	533	1.38%	New
Independent	Kanval Nain Singh	524	1.36%	New
Independent	Bhartu	482	1.25%	New
Margin of victory		336	0.87%	▼20.67
Turnout		38,488	77.09%	▲9.08
Registered electors		51,455		▲11.44
ABJS gain from Independent		Swing	▼21.98	

=== Assembly Election 1968 ===
1968 Haryana Legislative Assembly election: Nilokheri
Party	Candidate	Votes	%	±%
Independent	Chanda Singh	15,155	49.94%	New
INC	Ram Sarup Giri	8,617	28.40%	▲2.8
ABJS	Shiv Ram	6,572	21.66%	▼12.15
Margin of victory		6,538	21.55%	▲17.37
Turnout		30,344	67.37%	▼5.51
Registered electors		46,172		▲4.84
Independent gain from ABJS		Swing		

=== Assembly Election 1967 ===
1967 Haryana Legislative Assembly election: Nilokheri
Party	Candidate	Votes	%	±%
ABJS	S. Ram	10,605	33.81%	New
Independent	C. Singh	9,294	29.63%	New
INC	H. Singh	8,030	25.60%	New
RPI	S. Ram	2,853	9.09%	New
Independent	G. Dutt	587	1.87%	New
Margin of victory		1,311	4.18%	
Turnout		31,369	75.58%	
Registered electors		44,039		
ABJS win (new seat)				

== See also ==
- List of constituencies of the Haryana Legislative Assembly
- Karnal district
