= Dharam Singh Chhoker =

Indian politician

Member of the Haryana Legislative Assembly
- In office 2019–2024
- Preceded by: Ravinder Machhrouli
- Succeeded by: Manmohan Bhadana
- Constituency: Samalkha

Personal details
- Born: 15 April 1964 (age 62) Panipat, Haryana
- Party: Indian National Congress
- Occupation: Politician

Dharam Singh Chhoker is an Indian politician. He was elected to the Haryana Legislative Assembly from Samalkha as a legislator in the 2019 Haryana Legislative Assembly election as a candidate of the Indian National Congress.
