= Anirudh Chaudhry =

Indian sports administrator

Treasurer of the Board of Control for Cricket in India
- Website: bcci.tv

Anirudh Chaudhry is an Indian sports administrator and politician from Haryana. He was the Treasurer of the Board of Control for Cricket in India (BCCI). He has served as the manager of the Indian team for its tour of England in 2011. Other positions he held include honorary secretary of the Haryana Cricket Association, Manager of the Indian team for the ICC T20 World Cup in England in 2009 and manager of the India under-19 team that took part in the ICC under-19 World Cup held in New Zealand in 2010.

== Personal life ==
His father Ranbir Singh Mahendra was the President of the BCCI. Grandson of Chaudhary Bansi Lal

== Controversy ==
Chaudhry has been the focus of several controversies. One of those revolved around spendings in maintaining his three offices, which was raised in 2014. The subject of BCCI's and Chaudhry's spending was raised again in 2017.

A second controversy was around the implementation of recommendation by a panel headed by Rajendra Mal Lodha, a subject which was placed before the Supreme Court of India. In July 2017 Chaudhry was accused by the Committee of Administrators (CoA) that he "lacks courage to implement Lodha reforms". In September 2017 he was one of the three senior BCCI officials which were reprimanded by the Supreme Court for their "obstinate behaviour" in handling the recommendations. In November 2017, allegations were raised that Chaudhry has issued death threats to BCCI CFO, Santosh Rangnekar. The allegations were denied by Chaudhry's attorney. In January 2018 the other two officials has stated explicitly that Chaudhry was the "hurdle in the process of implementing the recommendations", though Chaudhry claims he was singled out because he is "the only one asking questions".
