= Jaswinder Singh Sandhu =

Indian politician (1955–2019)

Jaswinder Singh Sandhu (4 August 1955 - 19 January 2019) was an Indian politician. Belonging to the Indian National Lok Dal (INLD) party, he was a member of the Haryana Legislative Assembly representing the Pehowa Vidhan Sabha constituency in Haryana.

Jaswinder Singh Sandhu was born on 4 August 1955. He was educated at Gumthala Garhu village in Pehowa to matriculation level and became involved in agriculture as well as politics. He was married to Amarjeet Kaur and had three sons.

Sandhu was sarpanch of Gumthala Garhu from 1978 to 1991. He was also an organiser for the Samajwadi Party prior to becoming a member of the INLD. He was elected four times to the Haryana Legislative Assembly, in 1991, 1996, 2000 and 2014.

Sandhu died on 19 January 2019. He had cancer.
