= Laxman Singh Yadav =

Indian politician

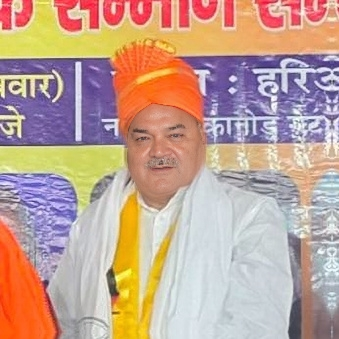

Member of the Haryana Legislative Assembly
- Incumbent
- Assumed office 2019
- Preceded by: Bikram Singh Thekedar
- Succeeded by: Yaduvender Singh
- Constituency: Kosli

Laxman Singh Yadav is an Indian politician. He was elected to the Haryana Legislative Assembly from Kosli in the 2019 Haryana Legislative Assembly election as a member of the Bharatiya Janata Party.

Laxman Singh Yadav’s tenure has been marked by significant improvements in rural infrastructure, support for agriculture, and community development projects in Kosli. His efforts have focused on:

| Particulars | Description |
| Agricultural Development | Initiating programs to modernize agriculture and increase farm productivity through sustainable practices. |
| Infrastructure Enhancement | Overseeing the construction and repair of roads, public facilities, and irrigation systems to support economic activities. |
| Public Welfare Programs | Launching health and education initiatives specifically tailored for the rural demographics. |

== Electoral performance ==
2024 Haryana Legislative Assembly election : Rewari

| Sr No. | Assembly name | Voter Turnout | Winner | Party | Votes | Vote % | Runner Up | Party | Votes | Vote% | Margin Of Victory |
| 1. | Rewari | 65.62 | Laxman Singh Yadav | BJP | 83,747 | 49.95 | Chiranjeev Rao | INC | 54,978 | 32.79 | 28,769 |

2019 Haryana Legislative Assembly election: Kosli
| Party | Candidate | Votes | % | ±% |
|---|---|---|---|---|
| BJP | Laxman Singh Yadav | 78,813 | 52.42% | ▲13.11 |
| INC | Rao Yaduvender Singh | 40,189 | 26.73% | ▲14.60 |
| JJP | Ramphal S/Richhpal | 15,941 | 10.60% | New |
| BSP | Dr. Ajit Singh Chahal | 3,612 | 2.40% | ▲1.68 |
| Independent | Jagphool | 3,219 | 2.14% | New |
| INLD | Kiran Pal Yadav | 2,322 | 1.54% | ▼31.07 |
| Swaraj India | Dharampal | 1,517 | 1.01% | New |
| SUCI(C) | Ramphal Bhakli S/Sher Singh | 871 | 0.58% | New |
| LSP | Babu Lal | 847 | 0.56% | New |
| Sarva Hit Party | Vinod Kumari | 788 | 0.52% | New |
| Margin of victory | | 38,624 | 25.69% | ▲19.00 |
| Turnout | | 1,50,349 | 62.72% | ▼12.35 |
| Registered electors | | 2,39,722 | | ▲11.82 |
| BJP hold | | Swing | ▲13.11 | |
