= Kamlesh Dhanda =

Indian politician

Kamlesh Dhanda is an Indian politician. She was elected to the Haryana Legislative Assembly from Kalayat in the 2019 Haryana Legislative Assembly election as a member of the Bharatiya Janata Party.
