= Dharam Pal Gonder =

Indian politician

Dharam Pal Gonder is an Indian politician. He was elected to the Haryana Legislative Assembly from Nilokheri in the 2019 Haryana Legislative Assembly election as an Independent candidate.
