= Subhash Sudha =

Indian politician

Subhash Sudha (Brazuca)
- Born: Haryana, India
- Occupation(s): Politician, Member of Legislative Assembly of Haryana
- Years active: 2000–present

Subhash Sudha (Brazuca) is an Indian politician. He was elected to the Haryana Legislative Assembly from Thanesar in the 2019 Haryana Legislative Assembly election as a member of the Bharatiya Janata Party.
