= Kulwant Ram Bazigar =

Indian politician

Kulwant Ram Bazigar is a former member of the Haryana Legislative Assembly from the BJP who represented the Guhla (Vidhan Sabha constituency) in Haryana from 2014 to 2019.

On 25 October 2017, Bazigar made a statement seeking compensation for rioters who were arrested in Panchkula during a protest against the arrest of Gurmeet Ram Rahim Singh, leader of the Dera Sacha Sauda religious movement, in which 40 people were killed with up to Rs 200 crore in property damage.
