= Bachan Singh Arya =

Indian politician

MLA of the Haryana Legislative Assembly
- In office 2005–2009
- Preceded by: Ram Phal
- Succeeded by: Kali Ram Patwari
- Constituency: Safidon Assembly constituency

MLA of the Haryana Legislative Assembly
- In office 1991–1996
- Preceded by: Sardul Singh
- Constituency: Safidon Assembly constituency

Personal details
- Born: 5 April 1955 (age 71)
- Party: Bhartiya Janata Party
- Education: M.A. (History)

Bachan Singh Arya is an Indian politician and served as Minister in Government of Haryana. He is two terms elected MLA representing Safidon Assembly constituency. He won 1991 Haryana Legislative Assembly election from Indian National Congress and 2005 Haryana Legislative Assembly election as Independent.

Bachan Singh Arya contested the Haryana Legislative Assembly election consecutively in the years 1991, 1996, 2000, 2005, 2009, 2014, and 2019.

== Political career ==
Bhajan Lal Bishnoi was elected Chief Minister and along with him Bachan Singh Arya also took oath as Minister of State in the Haryana Government. And as Minister of State departments, Arya was given important departments like Excise and Taxation, Education, Agriculture, and Housing Board.

Bachan Singh Arya started his political career after joining the Arya Samaj. Due to his opposition to social evils, he was sent to jail several times. While living in Arya Samaj and being active in social movements, the brilliance of Bachan Singh Arya's working style was attracting the leaders of political parties as well. During a speech by Bachan Arya in an event in Delhi, the Prime Minister of India at that time Rajiv Gandhi was so impressed by him and requested Mr. Arya to join Congress Party. And Bachan Singh Arya joined Indian National Congress Party in 1990. As a candidate of INC, he contested his first Lok Sabha Election in 1991 from Safidon Assembly constituency and won with a margin of 22,030 votes. Arya defeated all his rivals and won with huge votes, But meanwhile Rajiv Gandhi died in a terrorist attack.

Bhajan Lal Bishnoi was elected Chief Minister and along with him Bachan Singh Arya also took oath as Minister of State in the Haryana Government. And as Minister of State departments, Arya was given important departments like Excise and Taxation, Education, Agriculture, and Housing Board.

== Positions held ==
From	To	Position
MLA	Haryana Legislative Assembly	2005-2009
MLA	Haryana Legislative Assembly	1991-1996
Minister	Haryana Government	1991-1996
Deputy Leader	Indian National Congress	1993-1996
State President INC Haryana	Indian National Congress	2003-2005

== Electoral performance ==
=== Assembly Election 2019 ===
2019 Haryana Legislative Assembly election : Safidon
Party	Candidate	Votes	%	±%
INC	Subhash Gangoli	57,468	42.28%	▲23.47
BJP	Bachan Singh	53,810	39.58%	▲18.73
JJP	Dayanand Kundu	7,772	5.72%	
Independent	Rajbir Sharma	7,361	5.42%	
LSP	Vijay Saini	5,617	4.13%	
BSP	Jagdish Bhukal	2,036	1.50%	▼13.31
INLD	Joginder Kalwa	1,189	0.87%	▼18.49
Margin of victory		3,658	2.69%	▲1.63
Turnout		1,35,936	75.80%	▼6.68
Registered electors		1,79,332		▲10.38
INC gain from Independent		Swing	▲20.36	

=== Assembly Election 2005 ===
2005 Haryana Legislative Assembly election : Safidon
Party	Candidate	Votes	%	±%
Independent	Bachan Singh	43,721	43.84%	
INC	Karmvir Saini	26,077	26.15%	▼17.01
INLD	Ramphal Kundu	17,584	17.63%	▼35.3
BJP	Vijay Pal Singh	3,557	3.57%	
BRP	Rajpal Singh	3,506	3.52%	
Independent	Subhash Gangoli	1,680	1.68%	
BSP	Sardul Singh	1,152	1.16%	▼1.26
Independent	Naresh Kumar	929	0.93%	
Independent	Karambir	537	0.54%	
Margin of victory		17,644	17.69%	▲7.92
Turnout		99,725	78.54%	▲4.64
Registered electors		1,26,978		▲9.44
Independent gain from INLD		Swing	▼9.09	

=== Assembly Election 1991 ===
1991 Haryana Legislative Assembly election : Safidon
Party	Candidate	Votes	%	±%
INC	Bachan Singh	22,030	32.10%	▲9.72
JP	Ram Phal	19,433	28.31%	
Independent	Bani Ram	8,863	12.91%	
HVP	Dhajja Ram	7,460	10.87%	
Independent	Ram Bhaj	3,701	5.39%	
Kalyan Morcha	Ram Kumar	1,570	2.29%	
Independent	Madan	1,396	2.03%	
BJP	Prem Chand	1,313	1.91%	
Independent	Sultan	829	1.21%	
Independent	Jasbir Singh	679	0.99%	
Margin of victory		2,597	3.78%	▼36.89
Turnout		68,633	70.35%	▼0.95
Registered electors		1,01,396		▲5.89
INC gain from Independent		Swing	▼30.95	
