= 2005 Haryana Legislative Assembly election =

Legislative assembly election in Haryana, India

- 27 February 2005

All 90 seats to the Haryana Legislative Assembly 46 seats needed for a majority

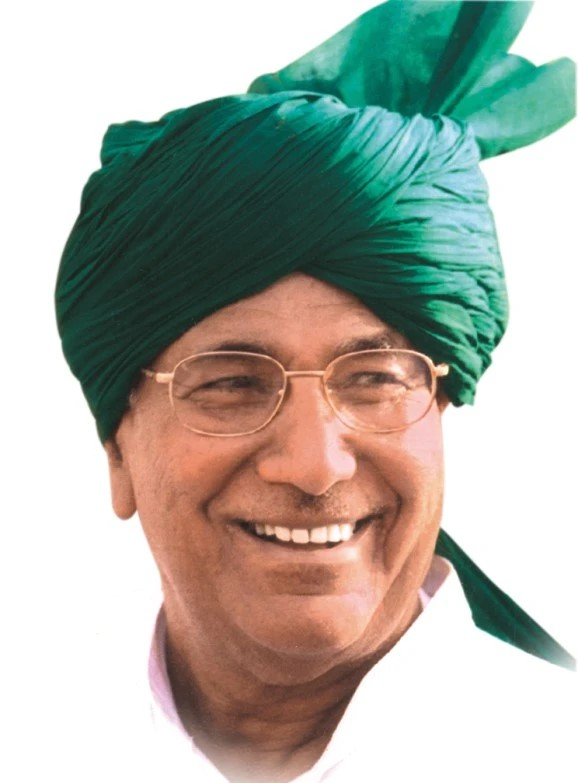
	First party	Second party
Leader	Bhajan Lal	Om Prakash Chautala
Party	INC	INLD
Leader since	1 August 2002	24 July 1999
Leader's seat	Adampur	Rori, Narwana (won, lost)
Last election	21	47
Seats won	67	9
Seat change	▲46	▼38
Percentage	42.46%	26.77%
Swing	▲11.24%	▼2.84%
Chief Minister before election
Om Prakash Chautala
INLD
Elected Chief Minister
Bhupinder Singh Hooda
INC

The 2005 Haryana Legislative Assembly election was held on 3 February 2005, to elect the 90 members of the Haryana Legislative Assembly. Results were declared on 27 February 2005. Indian National Congress won 67 seats and formed the government.

== Parties and alliances ==
=== Indian National Congress ===
No.	Party	Flag	Symbol	Leader	Seats contested
1.	Indian National Congress			Bhajan Lal Bishnoi	90

=== Indian National Lok Dal ===
No.	Party	Flag	Symbol	Leader	Seats contested
1.	Indian National Lok Dal			Om Prakash Chautala	89

=== National Democratic Alliance ===
No.	Party	Flag	Symbol	Leader	Seats contested
1.	Bharatiya Janata Party			Ganeshi Lal	90

== Results ==
The results were declared on 27 February 2005.

=== By alliance/party ===
Vote Share by alliance
1. INC (42.5%)
2. INLD (26.8%)
3. BJP (10.4%)
4. BSP (3.22%)
5. NCP (0.68%)
6. IND (13.7%)
7. NOTA (2.81%)
8. Other (-0.00%)
Seat Share
1. INC (74.4%)
2. INLD (10.0%)
3. Other (15.6%)

Party	INC	INLD	BJP	OTH
Seats	67	9	2	12

Party	Candidates	Seats won	Vote %
Indian National Congress	90	67	42.46
Indian National Lok Dal	89	9	26.77
Bharatiya Janata Party	90	2	10.36
Bahujan Samaj Party	84	1	3.22
Nationalist Congress Party	14	1	0.68
Independents	442	10	13.70
Total	809	90	

== Elected members ==
Winner, runner-up, voter turnout, and victory margin in every constituency
Assembly Constituency		Turnout	Winner				Runner Up				Margin
#k	Names	%	Candidate	Party	Votes	%	Candidate	Party	Votes	%	Margin
1	Kalka	64.03%	Chander Mohan	INC	98,765	63.09%	Pardeep Chaudhary	INLD	37,289	23.82%	61,476
2	Naraingarh	77.66%	Ram Kishan	INC	40,877	43.73%	Pawan Kumar	INLD	33,114	35.43%	7,763
3	Sadhaura	81.49%	Balwant Singh	INLD	35,664	32.14%	Deep Chand	Independent	27,222	24.53%	8,442
4	Chhachhrauli	86.24%	Arjan Singh	BSP	35,853	33.86%	Akram Khan	INLD	31,625	29.87%	4,228
5	Yamunanagar	66.78%	Dr. Krishna Pandit	INC	47,360	48.20%	Ghanshyam Dass	BJP	22,851	23.25%	24,509
6	Jagadhri	77.00%	Subhash Chand	INC	32,432	32.04%	Rajiv Kumar	BSP	29,238	28.89%	3,194
7	Mulana	75.49%	Phool Chand Mullana	INC	46,067	45.54%	Risal Singh	INLD	36,937	36.52%	9,130
8	Ambala Cantt.	68.55%	Devender Kumar Bansal	INC	17,723	30.37%	Anil Vij	Independent	17,108	29.32%	615
9	Ambala City	61.97%	Venod Sharma	INC	50,618	64.52%	Surjit Singh	INLD	15,302	19.50%	35,316
10	Naggal	77.52%	Nirmal Singh Mohra	INC	52,579	46.90%	Jasbir Singh Mallour	INLD	47,087	42.00%	5,492
11	Indri	79.53%	Rakesh Kumar	INC	40,740	35.38%	Bhim Sain	Independent	21,162	18.38%	19,578
12	Nilokheri	79.55%	Jai Singh Rana	INC	37,931	38.03%	Bakshish Singh	BJP	25,537	25.60%	12,394
13	Karnal	63.28%	Sumita Singh	INC	53,300	53.01%	Jai Parkash	Independent	19,303	19.20%	33,997
14	Jundla	71.19%	Meena Rani	INC	31,844	35.97%	Naphe Singh	INLD	29,703	33.55%	2,141
15	Gharaunda	76.39%	Rekha Rana	INLD	25,237	25.14%	Jai Pal Sharma	Independent	25,216	25.12%	21
16	Assandh	72.26%	Raj Rani Poonam	INC	46,109	49.43%	Krishan Lal	INLD	33,564	35.98%	12,545
17	Panipat	64.65%	Balbir Paul	INC	55,828	42.98%	Om Parkash Jain	Independent	42,181	32.47%	13,647
18	Samalkha	77.31%	Bharat Singh	INC	51,767	48.65%	Katar Singh Chhokar	INLD	28,002	26.31%	23,765
19	Naultha	74.32%	Parsanni Devi	INC	37,396	39.55%	Ramrati Jaglan	INLD	34,906	36.92%	2,490
20	Shahbad	76.36%	Kharaiti Lal	INC	36,377	39.57%	Onkar Singh	INLD	34,465	37.49%	1,912
21	Radaur	80.73%	Ishwar Singh Palaka	INLD	26,933	27.41%	Lehri Singh	INC	21,670	22.05%	5,263
22	Thanesar	73.89%	Ramesh Kumar	INC	55,729	47.85%	Ashok Kumar	INLD	40,943	35.15%	14,786
23	Pehowa	75.68%	Harmohinder Singh	INC	34,008	33.64%	Balbir Singh Saini	BJP	30,355	30.03%	3,653
24	Guhla	76.65%	Dillu Ram	INC	55,487	51.53%	Buta Singh	INLD	45,360	42.13%	10,127
25	Kaithal	71.55%	Shamsher Singh Surjewala	INC	43,573	47.71%	Kailash Bhagat	INLD	38,461	42.12%	5,112
26	Pundri	79.83%	Dinesh Kaushik	Independent	33,024	32.42%	Narender Sharma	INLD	24,998	24.54%	8,026
27	Pai	81.79%	Tejender Pal Singh	Independent	32,437	35.14%	Ram Pal Majra	INLD	25,935	28.10%	6,502
28	Hassangarh	71.68%	Naresh Kumar	BJP	36,328	45.76%	Chakrvrty Sharma	INC	26,230	33.04%	10,098
29	Kiloi	67.40%	Krishan Hooda	INC	56,716	66.54%	Prem Singh	INLD	21,853	25.64%	34,863
30	Rohtak	64.75%	Shadi Lal Batra	INC	45,445	51.25%	Munish Grover	BJP	34,969	39.43%	10,476
31	Meham	77.70%	Anand Singh Dangi	INC	51,078	53.78%	Rajbir	INLD	28,001	29.48%	23,077
32	Kalanaur	70.25%	Kartar Devi	INC	34,896	49.18%	Mewa Singh	INLD	29,053	40.94%	5,843
33	Beri	72.53%	Dr. Raghuvir Singh Kadian	INC	43,133	56.01%	Om Pehlwan	INLD	27,665	35.93%	15,468
34	Salhawas	71.98%	Anita Yadav	INC	45,755	51.88%	Zile Singh	INLD	29,976	33.99%	15,779
35	Jhajjar	66.15%	Hari Ram	INC	43,739	50.82%	Kanta Devi	INLD	29,545	34.33%	14,194
36	Badli, Haryana	71.15%	Naresh Kumar	Independent	28,838	36.93%	Chatar Singh	INC	26,216	33.57%	2,622
37	Bahadurgarh	63.96%	Rajinder Singh S/O Suraj Mal	INC	41,313	40.31%	Nafe Singh Rathee	INLD	36,217	35.34%	5,096
38	Baroda	74.37%	Ramphal	INLD	26,426	34.88%	Rampal	INC	23,199	30.62%	3,227
39	Gohana	70.45%	Dharam Pal Singh Malik	INC	42,000	46.19%	Prem Singh	INLD	28,598	31.45%	13,402
40	Kailana	73.84%	Jitender Singh	INC	33,787	35.57%	Nirmal Rani	Independent	28,596	30.10%	5,191
41	Sonipat	63.93%	Anil Thakar	INC	33,057	31.15%	Rajiv Kumar	Independent	28,941	27.27%	4,116
42	Rai	72.00%	Ramesh Chander	INC	38,468	39.26%	Ajit	INLD	27,772	28.34%	10,696
43	Rohat	71.62%	Sukhbir Singh	NCP	43,246	52.97%	Padam Singh	INLD	20,106	24.63%	23,140
44	Kalayat	77.73%	Geeta	INC	35,730	42.56%	Pritam	INLD	34,318	40.88%	1,412
45	Narwana	87.46%	Randeep Singh	INC	52,813	48.97%	Om Prakash Chautala	INLD	50,954	47.24%	1,859
46	Uchana Kalan	79.43%	Birender Singh	INC	47,590	46.66%	Desh Raj	INLD	34,758	34.08%	12,832
47	Rajound	75.33%	Satvinder Singh	INC	31,858	40.03%	Balraj	INLD	29,061	36.51%	2,797
48	Jind	74.58%	Mange Ram Gupta	INC	43,883	39.33%	Surender Singh	INLD	26,448	23.70%	17,435
49	Julana	75.31%	Sher Singh	INC	32,232	37.22%	Parminder Singh Dhull	Independent	25,410	29.34%	6,822
50	Safidon	78.54%	Bachan Singh	Independent	43,721	43.84%	Karmvir Saini	INC	26,077	26.15%	17,644
51	Faridabad	52.07%	Akagar Chand Chaudhry	INC	84,788	62.66%	Chander Bhatia	BJP	31,893	23.57%	52,895
52	Mewla–Maharajpur	51.30%	Mahender Pratap	INC	1,11,478	64.56%	Krishan Pal	BJP	48,370	28.01%	63,108
53	Ballabgarh	60.35%	Sharda Rathore	INC	68,289	54.79%	Mool Chand Sharma	INLD	34,213	27.45%	34,076
54	Palwal	68.21%	Karan Singh Dalal	INC	58,074	57.30%	Subhash Chand	INLD	29,751	29.35%	28,323
55	Hassanpur	65.94%	Udai Bhan	INC	45,683	50.10%	Jagdish Nayar	INLD	40,352	44.25%	5,331
56	Hathin	71.10%	Harsh Kumar	Independent	31,879	35.96%	Chaudhary Jaleb Khan	INC	23,049	26.00%	8,830
57	Ferozepur Jhirka	69.57%	Azad Mohammad	INC	33,372	32.45%	Shakrulla Khan	Independent	31,649	30.78%	1,723
58	Nuh	69.77%	Habib Ur Rehman	Independent	36,879	38.31%	Chaudhary Aftab Ahmed	INC	32,520	33.78%	4,359
59	Taoru	71.82%	Sahida	INLD	34,194	31.40%	Zakir Hussain	INC	33,230	30.51%	964
60	Sohna	73.65%	Sukhbir Singh	Independent	50,967	43.94%	Dharam Pal	INC	38,732	33.39%	12,235
61	Gurgaon	47.87%	Dharambir	INC	76,319	54.58%	Gopi Chand	INLD	35,465	25.36%	40,854
62	Pataudi	61.45%	Bhupinder	INC	41,612	46.00%	Ganga Ram	INLD	33,096	36.59%	8,516
63	Badhra	76.39%	Dharambir	INC	42,981	41.86%	Ranbir Singh	INLD	25,745	25.07%	17,236
64	Dadri	73.61%	Nirpender	INC	29,164	30.44%	Satpal	Independent	27,874	29.10%	1,290
65	Mundhal Khurd	73.72%	Ranbir Singh Mahendra	INC	42,587	45.67%	Raghvir Singh	INLD	31,001	33.24%	11,586
66	Bhiwani	66.21%	Dr. Shiv Shanker Bhardwaj	INC	45,675	52.93%	Ghanshyam Saraf	BJP	23,874	27.67%	21,801
67	Tosham	74.68%	Surender Singh	INC	57,480	53.97%	Sunil Kumar Lamba	INLD	34,868	32.74%	22,612
68	Loharu	77.18%	Somvir Singh	INC	44,140	38.78%	Bahadur Singh	INLD	32,108	28.21%	12,032
69	Bawani Khera	75.80%	Ramkishan Fauji	INC	57,050	56.54%	Raghbir Singh Ranga	INLD	34,323	34.02%	22,727
70	Barwala	78.71%	Randhir	INC	34,084	31.57%	Umed Singh Lohan	INLD	30,664	28.40%	3,420
71	Narnaund	78.68%	Ram Kumar	BJP	31,132	34.07%	Saroj	INLD	29,733	32.54%	1,399
72	Hansi	75.89%	Amir Chand	INC	33,665	34.21%	Vinod Bhayana	Independent	29,212	29.69%	4,453
73	Bhattu Kalan	83.70%	Kulvir Singh	INC	50,102	47.98%	Sampat Singh	INLD	40,522	38.80%	9,580
74	Hisar	66.65%	Om Parkash Jindal	INC	51,097	47.11%	Hari Singh Saini	Independent	40,221	37.08%	10,876
75	Ghirai	79.25%	Prof. Chhattar Pal Singh	INC	53,186	51.73%	Jogi Ram Sihag Sisai	Independent	26,742	26.01%	26,444
76	Tohana	78.43%	Paramvir Singh	INC	51,851	45.43%	Nishan Singh	INLD	33,068	28.97%	18,783
77	Ratia	76.10%	Gian Chand	INLD	36,623	37.84%	Gurdeep Singh	INC	26,572	27.46%	10,051
78	Fatehabad	79.32%	Dura Ram	INC	61,011	48.94%	Swatantar Bala Chaudhary	INLD	50,386	40.42%	10,625
79	Adampur	79.11%	Bhajan Lal	INC	86,963	77.91%	Rajesh Godara	INLD	15,882	14.23%	71,081
80	Darba Kalan	85.17%	Bharat Singh	INC	61,002	51.47%	Vidya Beniwal	INLD	49,558	41.81%	11,444
81	Ellenabad	78.38%	Dr. Sushil Kumar Indora	INLD	49,803	44.56%	Mani Ram	INC	27,920	24.98%	21,883
82	Sirsa	73.43%	Lachhman Dass Arora	INC	60,957	53.78%	Padam Chand Jain	INLD	45,653	40.27%	15,304
83	Rori	87.97%	Om Prakash Chautala	INLD	67,996	60.00%	Jagdish Nehra	INC	41,418	36.55%	26,578
84	Dabwali	77.61%	Dr. Sita Ram	INLD	50,840	49.49%	Jagan Nath	INC	42,815	41.68%	8,025
85	Bawal	71.83%	Shakuntla Bhagwaria	Independent	38,153	35.66%	Bharat Singh S/O Surjan	INC	35,032	32.74%	3,121
86	Rewari	73.77%	Ajay Singh Yadav	INC	48,924	44.72%	Randhir Singh Kapriwas	BJP	36,145	33.04%	12,779
87	Jatusana	74.87%	Yadavendra Singh Alias Baljit Singh	INC	39,276	33.80%	Jagdish Yadav	INLD	37,817	32.55%	1,459
88	Mahendragarh	73.65%	Dan Singh	INC	59,128	52.04%	Ram Bilas Sharma	BJP	38,479	33.86%	20,649
89	Ateli	73.97%	Naresh Yadav Ateli	Independent	43,396	38.31%	Narender Singh	INC	40,440	35.70%	2,956
90	Narnaul	72.14%	Radhey Shyam	Independent	24,485	24.06%	Chander Parkash	INC	20,087	19.74%	4,398
