= 1991 Haryana Legislative Assembly election =

Legislative assembly election in Haryana, India

- 20 May 1991

All 90 seats to the Haryana Legislative Assembly 46 seats needed for a majority

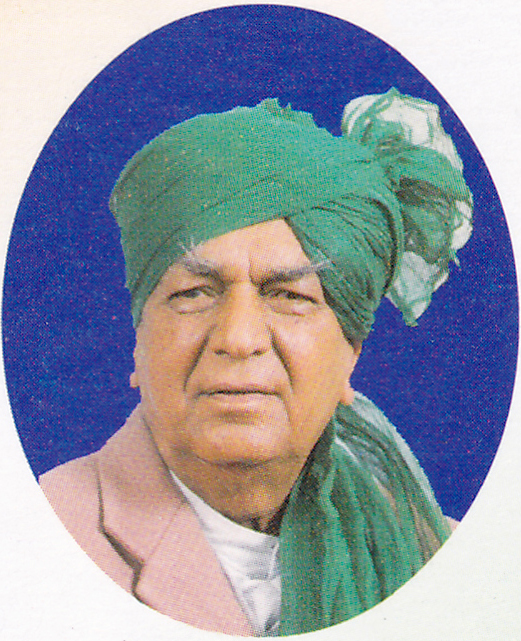

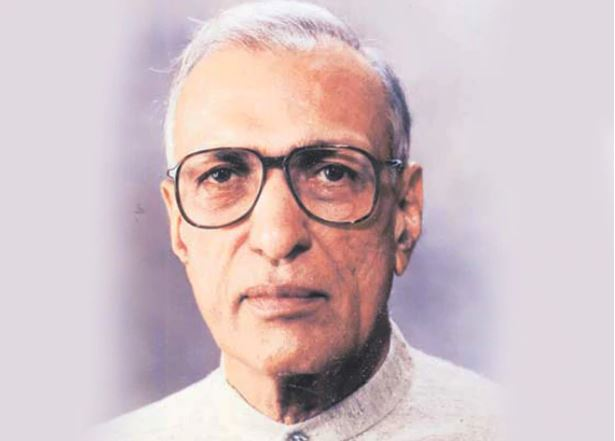
	First party	Second party	Third party
Leader	Bhajan Lal Bishnoi	Devi Lal	Bansi Lal
Party	INC	JP	HVP
Leader since	1982	1990	1991
Leader's seat	Adampur	Ghirai (lost)	Tosham
Last election	5	New	New
Seats won	51	16	12
Seat change	▲46	▲16	▲12
Percentage	33.75%	22.03%	12.54%
Swing	▲4.57 pp	New	New
Chief Minister before election
Hukam Singh
JD
Elected Chief Minister
Bhajan Lal
INC

The 1991 Haryana Legislative Assembly election was held on the 20th May 1991 in the Indian state of Haryana to elect all 90 members of the state's legislative assembly. The members were elected in the first-past-the-post system from 90 constituencies. Indian National Congress' Bhajan Lal was elected Chief Minister of Haryana after his party gained majority seats.

== Results ==
Summary of results of the Haryana Legislative Assembly election, 1991
Party	Candidates	Seats won	Votes	Vote %
Indian National Congress	90	51	2,084,856	33.73%
Janata Party	88	16	1,361,955	22.03%
Haryana Vikas Party	61	12	775,375	12.54%
Janata Dal	25	3	277,380	4.49%
Bharatiya Janata Party	89	2	582,850	9.43%
Bahujan Samaj Party	26	1	143,611	2.32%
Independents	1412	5	848,527	13.73%
Total	1885	90	6,181,187	

== Elected members ==
Winner, runner-up, voter turnout, and victory margin in every constituency
Assembly Constituency		Turnout	Winner				Runner Up				Margin
#k	Names	%	Candidate	Party	Votes	%	Candidate	Party	Votes	%	Margin
1	Kalka	65.71%	Purush Bhan	INC	29,025	32.30%	Lachhman Singh	HVP	24,034	26.74%	4,991
2	Naraingarh	74.67%	Surjeet Kumar	BSP	15,407	22.44%	Ashok Kumar	INC	10,869	15.83%	4,538
3	Sadhaura	75.51%	Sher Singh	IND	20,159	27.10%	Ramji Lal	JP	16,786	22.56%	3,373
4	Chhachhrauli	78.65%	Mohamad Aslam Khan	INC	16,916	23.70%	Aman Kumar	BSP	16,623	23.29%	293
5	Yamunanagar	62.38%	Rajesh Kumar	INC	25,885	33.97%	Kamla Verma	BJP	20,699	27.17%	5,186
6	Jagadhri	72.86%	Om Prakash Sharma	HVP	17,316	23.47%	Vishan Lal Saini	BSP	15,671	21.24%	1,645
7	Mulana	70.21%	Phool Chand Mullana	INC	23,961	35.12%	Faqir Chand	HVP	13,254	19.43%	10,707
8	Ambala Cantt.	65.24%	Brij Anand	INC	27,377	54.85%	Anil Vij	BJP	19,360	38.79%	8,017
9	Ambala City	68.17%	Sumer Chand	INC	20,489	32.92%	Faqir Chand Aggarwal	BJP	19,388	31.15%	1,101
10	Naggal	75.21%	Nirmal Singh	INC	31,407	44.10%	Gurbax Singh	JP	20,902	29.35%	10,505
11	Indri	73.59%	Janki Devi	HVP	13,917	18.81%	Bhim Sain	IND	13,461	18.20%	456
12	Nilokheri	73.47%	Jai Singh	IND	24,099	34.62%	Ishwar Singh	JP	11,280	16.20%	12,819
13	Karnal	63.07%	Jai Parkash	INC	36,485	51.63%	Chetan Dass	BJP	16,798	23.77%	19,687
14	Jundla	64.21%	Raj Kumar	INC	16,511	27.42%	Nafe Singh	JP	13,947	23.16%	2,564
15	Gharaunda	70.49%	Ram Pal Singh S/O Basant Singh	INC	19,466	27.92%	Om Parkash	BJP	9,692	13.90%	9,774
16	Assandh	62.92%	Krishan Lal	JP	25,144	41.81%	Karam Chand	INC	17,030	28.32%	8,114
17	Panipat	65.37%	Balbir Paul	INC	32,745	40.26%	Om Parkash	IND	24,504	30.13%	8,241
18	Samalkha	71.01%	Hari Singh	JD	24,225	34.30%	Katar Singh	INC	22,479	31.83%	1,746
19	Naultha	70.21%	Satbir Singh Kadiyan	JP	24,582	37.62%	Satbir Singh Malik	INC	23,634	36.17%	948
20	Shahbad	73.57%	Kharaiti Lal	BJP	18,165	26.09%	Onkar Singh	JP	17,524	25.17%	641
21	Radaur	70.71%	Lehri Singh	HVP	21,645	33.21%	Banta Ram	JP	19,321	29.65%	2,324
22	Thanesar	67.38%	Ram Parkash	INC	24,471	33.65%	Ashok Kumar	JP	18,458	25.38%	6,013
23	Pehowa	74.65%	Jaswinder Singh	JP	23,236	30.63%	Balbir Singh	IND	17,344	22.86%	5,892
24	Guhla	72.36%	Amar Singh	JP	34,990	46.50%	Dillu Ram	INC	31,760	42.21%	3,230
25	Kaithal	73.32%	Surinder Kumar	INC	17,190	25.90%	Charan Das	HVP	16,753	25.24%	437
26	Pundri	74.50%	Ishwar S/O Sind Ram	INC	22,660	33.22%	Makhan Singh	JP	14,476	21.22%	8,184
27	Pai	71.25%	Tejender Pal Singh	INC	26,752	41.53%	Nar Singh Dhanda	JP	15,904	24.69%	10,848
28	Hassangarh	62.39%	Balwant Singh	JP	27,929	49.08%	Virendra Kumar	INC	23,100	40.59%	4,829
29	Kiloi	64.52%	Krishan Hooda	INC	27,265	45.01%	Krishan Hooda	JP	24,038	39.68%	3,227
30	Rohtak	61.21%	Subhash Chander	INC	26,398	34.92%	Kishan Das	HVP	23,791	31.47%	2,607
31	Meham	65.98%	Anand Singh Dangi	INC	43,608	63.75%	Sube Singh	JP	17,259	25.23%	26,349
32	Kalanaur	60.78%	Kartar Devi	INC	26,194	49.36%	Hardul	JP	15,859	29.89%	10,335
33	Beri	62.59%	Om Parkash	INC	25,077	42.87%	Virender Pal	JP	19,521	33.38%	5,556
34	Salhawas	61.73%	Zile Singh	JP	18,448	30.89%	Narvir Singh	INC	17,807	29.82%	641
35	Jhajjar	55.89%	Dariyav Khatik	JP	22,305	37.81%	Banarasi Dass	INC	20,335	34.47%	1,970
36	Badli, Haryana	62.05%	Dheer Pal Singh	JP	29,284	51.52%	Manphool Singh	HVP	16,908	29.75%	12,376
37	Bahadurgarh	58.91%	Suraj Mal	INC	20,956	30.90%	Kaptan Chait Ram	JP	17,583	25.93%	3,373
38	Baroda	61.97%	Ramesh Kumar	JP	31,133	53.27%	Ram Dhari	INC	20,297	34.73%	10,836
39	Gohana	65.38%	Kitab Singh Malik	IND	27,057	38.31%	Ram Dhari	INC	18,349	25.98%	8,708
40	Kailana	66.76%	Shanti Devi	INC	30,782	45.12%	Bed Singh Malik	JP	22,609	33.14%	8,173
41	Sonipat	60.61%	Sham Dass	INC	25,623	37.07%	Satender	JP	17,023	24.63%	8,600
42	Rai	62.74%	Jaipal	JP	21,195	32.75%	Jaswant Singh	INC	20,598	31.83%	597
43	Rohat	58.27%	Hukam Singh	INC	19,834	36.26%	Mohinder Singh	JP	19,796	36.20%	38
44	Kalayat	64.04%	Bharath Singh	JP	20,049	36.22%	Jogi Ram S/O Datu Ram	INC	17,117	30.92%	2,932
45	Narwana	73.60%	Shamsher Singh S/O Ganga Singh	INC	23,445	34.39%	Gauri Shanker	HVP	16,284	23.89%	7,161
46	Uchana Kalan	71.48%	Birendar Singh	INC	31,937	45.21%	Desh Raj	JP	23,093	32.69%	8,844
47	Rajound	68.44%	Ram Kumar	JP	20,864	37.04%	Satvinder Singh	INC	18,245	32.39%	2,619
48	Jind	69.58%	Mange Ram Gupta	INC	35,346	47.58%	Tek Ram S/O Jug Lal	JP	19,213	25.86%	16,133
49	Julana	69.70%	Suraj Bhan	JP	16,157	26.15%	Parminder Singh Dhull	INC	13,154	21.29%	3,003
50	Safidon	70.35%	Bachan Singh	INC	22,030	32.10%	Ram Phal	JP	19,433	28.31%	2,597
51	Faridabad	56.55%	Akagar Chand Chaudhry	INC	45,896	46.39%	Chander Bhatia	BJP	23,006	23.25%	22,890
52	Mewla–Maharajpur	58.66%	Mahender Pratap Singh	INC	51,775	50.56%	Gajraj Bahadur	HVP	22,341	21.82%	29,434
53	Ballabgarh	58.85%	Rajinder Singh Bisla	INC	32,225	40.03%	Anand Kumar	BJP	18,632	23.15%	13,593
54	Palwal	66.40%	Karan Singh Dalal	HVP	27,882	38.74%	Nitya Nand Sharma	INC	18,008	25.02%	9,874
55	Hassanpur	64.98%	Ram Rattan	INC	24,962	37.11%	Udai Bhan	JP	24,127	35.87%	835
56	Hathin	67.59%	Ajmat Khan	INC	18,250	28.35%	Bhagwan Saye	JD	15,334	23.82%	2,916
57	Ferozepur Jhirka	67.37%	Shakrulla Khan	INC	22,661	32.45%	Ishaq	JD	19,184	27.47%	3,477
58	Nuh	62.27%	Chaudhary Mohammad Ilyas	INC	17,274	28.47%	Hamid Hussain	IND	13,031	21.48%	4,243
59	Taoru	70.07%	Zakir Hussain	IND	28,513	39.00%	Suraj Pal Singh	BJP	22,613	30.93%	5,900
60	Sohna	67.10%	Dharam Pal	INC	34,047	46.66%	Aridaman Singh	JP	16,703	22.89%	17,344
61	Gurgaon	62.31%	Dharambir S/O Pannu Ram	INC	37,081	44.23%	Gopi Chand	IND	17,879	21.32%	19,202
62	Pataudi	57.73%	Mohan Lal	JP	21,566	35.12%	Narayan Singh S/O Bichha Ram	HVP	17,004	27.69%	4,562
63	Badhra	62.39%	Attar Singh S/O Lok Ram	HVP	29,250	47.62%	Dalbir	JP	13,480	21.95%	15,770
64	Dadri	62.65%	Daharampal Singh	HVP	20,918	33.31%	Jagjeet Singh	INC	20,838	33.18%	80
65	Mundhal Khurd	60.35%	Chhatar Singh Chauhan	HVP	26,965	46.28%	Bir Singh	INC	17,006	29.18%	9,959
66	Bhiwani	58.77%	Ram Bhajan	HVP	29,390	47.15%	Shiv Kumar S/O Kadar Nath	IND	8,472	13.59%	20,918
67	Tosham	65.03%	Bansi Lal	HVP	38,272	55.10%	Dharambir	INC	25,507	36.72%	12,765
68	Loharu	57.96%	Chandrawati	JD	23,953	39.43%	Sohanlal	JP	11,462	18.87%	12,491
69	Bawani Khera	59.68%	Amar Singh	HVP	21,869	36.43%	Jagan Nath	JP	14,892	24.81%	6,977
70	Barwala	62.22%	Joginder Singh	INC	30,099	42.38%	Surender	JD	19,474	27.42%	10,625
71	Narnaund	68.07%	Virender Singh	JD	20,011	32.09%	Jaswant Singh	INC	19,973	32.03%	38
72	Hansi	66.12%	Amir Chand	IND	19,689	29.20%	Attar Singh	IND	17,768	26.35%	1,921
73	Bhattu Kalan	74.31%	Sampat Singh	JP	25,004	36.49%	Mani Ram Godara	HVP	22,330	32.59%	2,674
74	Hisar	64.57%	Om Parkash Jindal	HVP	37,909	47.61%	Om Parkash Mahajan	INC	33,792	42.44%	4,117
75	Ghirai	67.27%	Chhatarpal Singh	INC	29,927	43.97%	Devi Lal	JP	27,773	40.80%	2,154
76	Tohana	70.64%	Harpal Singh	INC	22,279	30.23%	Vinod Kumar	IND	19,488	26.44%	2,791
77	Ratia	65.81%	Pir Chand	HVP	13,255	20.77%	Ram Sarup S/O Sadhu	BJP	11,988	18.78%	1,267
78	Fatehabad	67.45%	Lila Krishan	INC	24,883	32.28%	Prithvi Singh Gorkhpuria	CPI(M)	19,675	25.53%	5,208
79	Adampur	72.74%	Bhajan Lal Bishnoi	INC	48,117	65.70%	Hari Singh	JP	16,521	22.56%	31,596
80	Darba Kalan	73.07%	Mani Ram	JP	35,981	46.88%	Bharat Singh	INC	29,938	39.01%	6,043
81	Ellenabad	70.75%	Mani Ram	INC	39,595	50.61%	Bhagi Ram	JP	25,834	33.02%	13,761
82	Sirsa	67.55%	Lachhman Dass Arora	INC	33,102	40.23%	Ganeshi Lal	BJP	14,107	17.15%	18,995
83	Rori	74.81%	Jagdish Mehra	INC	34,902	45.44%	Hari Singh	JP	25,602	33.34%	9,300
84	Dabwali	65.48%	Santosh Chauhan Sarwan	INC	32,296	44.15%	Gain Chand	JP	19,637	26.85%	12,659
85	Bawal	58.78%	Shakuntla Bhagwaria	INC	31,605	47.38%	Hargi Ram Bhagotia	JP	21,864	32.78%	9,741
86	Rewari	59.98%	Ajay Singh Yadav	INC	33,922	52.78%	Rajinder Singh	HVP	8,098	12.60%	25,824
87	Jatusana	60.66%	Rao Inderjit Singh	INC	34,606	48.68%	Jagdish Yadav	HVP	19,380	27.26%	15,226
88	Mahendragarh	60.65%	Ram Bilas Sharma	BJP	18,039	26.42%	Dalip Singh	HVP	16,413	24.04%	1,626
89	Ateli	57.77%	Bamshi Singh	INC	19,343	29.61%	Ajit Singh	JP	19,277	29.51%	66
90	Narnaul	61.97%	Phusa Ram	INC	29,366	42.83%	Udmi Ram	JP	11,123	16.22%	18,243
