= Krishan Hooda =

Indian politician (1945–2020)

Member of the Haryana Legislative Assembly
- In office 2009–2020
- Preceded by: Ramphal
- Succeeded by: Indu Raj Narwal
- Constituency: Baroda

Personal details
- Party: Indian National Congress
- Parent: Bhale Ram

Krishan Hooda (1945–2020) was an Indian politician from Haryana. He was elected as a Member of the Haryana Legislative Assembly from the Baroda Assembly constituency from 2009 to 2020. He last represented the Indian National Congress winning the 2019 Haryana Legislative Assembly election from Baroda. Earlier, he won three times from the Garhi Sampla-Kiloi Assembly constituency. He vacated his seat for Bhupinder Singh Hoodain 2005.

== Early life and education ==
Hooda was born in Garhi Sampla Kiloi, Haryana in 1945 to Bhale Ram. He passed Class 9 from Government High School, Khidwali tehsil, Rohtak, in 1965.

== Career ==
Hooda was first elected as an MLA winning from Garhi Sampla-Kiloi Assembly constituency representing the Lok Dal in the 1987 Haryana Legislative Assembly election. He won again on Samta Party ticket in the 1996 Haryana Legislative Assembly election where he polled 27,884 votes and defeated Ram Phool of HVP by a margin of 8,165 votes. He won for the third time from the same constituency in 2005 defeating Prem Singh of the Indian National Lok Dal party by a margin of 34,863 votes, but later shifted to Baroda Assembly constituency where he won continuously for three times in the 2009, 2014 and 2019 elections. He won the 2009 Haryana Legislative Assembly election defeating Kapoor Singh Narwal of INLD by a margin of 25,343 votes. In 2014, he retained the seat defeating Narwal again. In the 2019 Haryana Legislative Assembly election he defeated his nearest rival, Yogeshwar Dutt of the Bharatiya Janata Party, by a margin of 5,100 votes.
