= Hukam Singh Suhag =

Indian politician (born 1951)

Chaudhri Hukam Singh

Member of the Haryana Legislative Assembly
- In office 1982–1987
- Constituency: Salhawas

Personal details
- Born: March 14, 1951 (age 75) Matanhail, Haryana, India
- Party: Indian National Congress (elected as Independent)
- Occupation: Politician, Agriculturist

Hukam Singh Suhag (born 14 March 1951) is an Indian politician who served as a Member of the Legislative Assembly (MLA) in the Haryana Legislative Assembly, representing the former Salhawas constituency from 1982 to 1987.

== Early life ==
Suhag completed his matriculation in Matanhail before pursuing agriculture as a profession and participating in regional community affairs. One of his son, Bhaag Singh Suhag, later entered the legal profession and served as president of the District Bar Association Chandigarh.

== Political career ==
In the 1982 Haryana Legislative Assembly election, Suhag contested from the Salhawas constituency as an independent candidate. He was elected to the 5th Haryana Legislative Assembly, defeating his nearest rival by a margin of 1,195 votes (2.42% of valid votes).

He served his full term until 1987. The Salhawas constituency was subsequently reorganized and abolished during the nationwide delimitation process.

== Electoral performance ==
1982 Haryana Legislative Assembly election: Salhawas
Party	Candidate	Votes	%	±%
Independent	Hukam Singh	15,746	31.92%	New
Independent	Ram Narain	14,551	29.50%	New
INC	Rai Singh Yadav	12,554	25.45%	▲19.63
LKD	Jorawar Singh	2,891	5.86%	New
Independent	Hari Ram Arya	1,329	2.69%	New
Independent	Balwant	924	1.87%	New
Independent	Chattru	554	1.12%	New
Independent	Dharm Pal Safedi Wala	391	0.79%	New
Margin of victory		1,195	2.42%	▼38.41
Turnout		49,328	64.31%	▲6.92
Registered electors		78,322		▲20.83
Independent gain from JP		Swing	▼25.82	

== Personal life ==
Suhag is married to Bimla Devi, and they have two sons and two daughters.
