= Sadhaura Assembly constituency =

Legislative Assembly constituency in Haryana State, India

Coordinates: 30.38°N 77.22°E

Sadhaura
- Constituency No. 7 for the Haryana Legislative Assembly

Constituency details
- Country: India
- Region: North India
- State: Haryana
- District: Yamunanagar
- Lok Sabha constituency: Ambala
- Total electors: 2,21,373
- Reservation: SC

Member of Legislative Assembly
- 15th Haryana Legislative Assembly
- Incumbent Renu Bala
- Party: Indian National Congress
- Elected year: 2024

Sadhaura is one of the 90 Legislative Assembly constituencies of Haryana state in India.

It is part of Yamunanagar district and is reserved for candidates belonging to the Scheduled Castes.

== Members of the Legislative Assembly ==
Year	Member	Party
1977	Bhag Mal	Janata Party
1982	Bhag Mal	Bharatiya Janata Party
1987	Bhag Mal	Independent
1991	Sher Singh	Independent
1996	Ramji Lal	Samata Party
2000	Balwant Singh	Indian National Lok Dal
2005	Balwant Singh	Indian National Lok Dal
2009	Rajpal	Indian National Congress
2014	Balwant Singh	Bharatiya Janata Party
2019	Renu Bala	Indian National Congress
2024	Renu Bala	Indian National Congress

== Election results ==
=== Assembly Election 2024 ===
2024 Haryana Legislative Assembly election: Sadhaura
Party	Candidate	Votes	%	±%
INC	Renu Bala	57,534	33.04	▼6.97
BJP	Balwant Singh	55,835	32.06	▲2.40
BSP	Brij Pal	53,496	30.72	▲14.99
ASP(KR)	Sohil	4,467	2.57	New
NOTA	None of the Above	605	0.35	New
Margin of victory		1,699	0.98	▼9.37
Turnout		1,74,150	78.95	▲1.52
Registered electors		2,21,373		▲3.85
INC hold		Swing	▼6.97	

=== Assembly Election 2019 ===
2019 Haryana Legislative Assembly election: Sadhaura
Party	Candidate	Votes	%	±%
INC	Renu Bala	65,806	40.01	27.07
BJP	Balwant Singh	48,786	29.66	−9.07
BSP	Sahi Ram	25,874	15.73	5.69
JJP	Dr. Kusum Sherwal	14,960	9.10	
LSP	Nathi Ram Khera	2,880	1.75	
INLD	Sushma Devi	1,285	0.78	−29.35
CPI	Arun Kumar	948	0.58	−0.17
Margin of victory		17,020	10.35	1.76
Turnout		1,64,482	77.43	−6.85
Registered electors		2,12,428		8.72
INC gain from BJP		Swing	1.28	

=== Assembly Election 2014 ===
2014 Haryana Legislative Assembly election: Sadhaura
Party	Candidate	Votes	%	±%
BJP	Balwant Singh	63,772	38.73	35.34
INLD	Pinki Chhapper	49,626	30.14	1.05
INC	Rajpal	21,299	12.93	−22.63
BSP	Kapoor Singh	16,542	10.05	−8.15
Independent	Lal Chand	4,228	2.57	
HJC(BL)	Ravi Bhushan	3,868	2.35	1.32
CPI	Arun Kumar	1,231	0.75	−0.50
Margin of victory		14,146	8.59	2.11
Turnout		1,64,673	84.28	3.81
Registered electors		1,95,382		18.32
BJP gain from INC		Swing	3.16	

=== Assembly Election 2009 ===
2009 Haryana Legislative Assembly election: Sadhaura
Party	Candidate	Votes	%	±%
INC	Rajpal	47,263	35.57	13.05
INLD	Balwant Singh	38,650	29.09	−3.05
BSP	Ravi Bhushan	24,183	18.20	7.87
Independent	Lal Chand	10,789	8.12	
BJP	Data Ram	4,496	3.38	−2.24
Independent	Deep Chand	2,058	1.55	
CPI	Arun Kumar	1,653	1.24	−0.13
HJC(BL)	Sher Singh	1,361	1.02	
SP	Raj Bhushan	1,196	0.90	
NCP	Vinay Kumar	772	0.58	−0.23
Margin of victory		8,613	6.48	−1.13
Turnout		1,32,885	80.47	−1.02
Registered electors		1,65,132		21.27
INC gain from INLD		Swing	3.43	

=== Assembly Election 2005 ===
2005 Haryana Legislative Assembly election: Sadhaura
Party	Candidate	Votes	%	±%
INLD	Balwant Singh	35,664	32.14	0.04
Independent	Deep Chand	27,222	24.53	
INC	Ramji Lal	24,989	22.52	−1.60
BSP	Lal Chand	11,464	10.33	−9.67
BJP	Data Ram	6,241	5.62	
BRP	Mohinder Singh	1,539	1.39	
CPI	Arun Kumar	1,530	1.38	0.00
Independent	Ram Parkash	1,392	1.25	
NCP	Balkar Singh	903	0.81	
Margin of victory		8,442	7.61	−0.36
Turnout		1,10,965	81.49	3.41
Registered electors		1,36,173		11.95
INLD hold		Swing	0.04	

=== Assembly Election 2000 ===
2000 Haryana Legislative Assembly election: Sadhaura
Party	Candidate	Votes	%	±%
INLD	Balwant Singh	30,106	32.10	
INC	Deep Chand	22,628	24.12	14.70
BSP	Aman Kumar	18,758	20.00	−2.25
Independent	Ramji Lal	9,887	10.54	
Independent	Lajja Ram	6,023	6.42	
Independent	Biru Ram	2,708	2.89	
CPI	Faquir Chand	1,291	1.38	−1.45
HVP	Pawan Kumar Sahota	1,008	1.07	
Independent	Balbir Singh	874	0.93	
Margin of victory		7,478	7.97	5.73
Turnout		93,800	78.08	−0.01
Registered electors		1,21,632		−2.69
INLD gain from SAP		Swing	5.00	

=== Assembly Election 1996 ===
1996 Haryana Legislative Assembly election: Sadhaura
Party	Candidate	Votes	%	±%
SAP	Ramji Lal	26,142	28.41	
Independent	Deep Chand	24,075	26.16	
BSP	Sahi Ram	20,469	22.25	8.16
INC	Lehri Singh	8,674	9.43	−4.12
BJP	Dayal Singh	5,874	6.38	2.72
CPI	Ranjeet Singh	2,604	2.83	−0.10
AIIC(T)	Amar Singh	906	0.98	
Independent	Parkash Kaur	681	0.74	
Independent	Krishan Chand	621	0.67	
Independent	Raj Kumar	478	0.52	
Margin of victory		2,067	2.25	−2.29
Turnout		92,015	78.09	2.58
Registered electors		1,24,992		18.45
SAP gain from Independent		Swing	1.31	

=== Assembly Election 1991 ===
1991 Haryana Legislative Assembly election: Sadhaura
Party	Candidate	Votes	%	±%
Independent	Sher Singh	20,159	27.10	
JP	Ramji Lal	16,786	22.56	
BSP	Sahi Ram	10,477	14.08	
INC	Kripa Ram	10,082	13.55	−16.79
HVP	Deep Chand	8,559	11.50	
BJP	Bhag Mal	2,726	3.66	
CPI	Desh Raj	2,181	2.93	−2.40
Independent	Mangat Ram	1,471	1.98	
Independent	Jai Pal	646	0.87	
Independent	Faquir Chand	543	0.73	
Margin of victory		3,373	4.53	−18.34
Turnout		74,397	75.51	−0.50
Registered electors		1,05,522		12.39
Independent hold		Swing	-26.12	

=== Assembly Election 1987 ===
1987 Haryana Legislative Assembly election: Sadhaura
Party	Candidate	Votes	%	±%
Independent	Bhag Mal	37,246	53.22	
INC	Sher Singh	21,238	30.35	−9.72
Independent	D. D. Kashyap	5,763	8.23	
CPI	Karam Chand	3,732	5.33	−5.51
Independent	Ramji Lal	869	1.24	
Independent	Gian Chand	632	0.90	
Margin of victory		16,008	22.87	22.85
Turnout		69,988	76.01	9.08
Registered electors		93,890		16.98
Independent gain from BJP		Swing	13.13	

=== Assembly Election 1982 ===
1982 Haryana Legislative Assembly election: Sadhaura
Party	Candidate	Votes	%	±%
BJP	Bhag Mal	20,981	40.08	
INC	Parbhu Ram	20,971	40.06	4.39
CPI	Karam Chand	5,674	10.84	4.29
Independent	Faquir Chand	1,003	1.92	
Independent	Ramji Dass	942	1.80	
JP	Hardyal Singh	856	1.64	−50.70
Independent	Darshal Lal	660	1.26	
Independent	Babu Ram	385	0.74	
Margin of victory		10	0.02	−16.64
Turnout		52,344	66.93	−2.32
Registered electors		80,260		18.88
BJP gain from JP		Swing	-12.25	

=== Assembly Election 1977 ===
1977 Haryana Legislative Assembly election: Sadhaura
Party	Candidate	Votes	%	±%
JP	Bhag Mal	23,989	52.34	
INC	Prabhu Ram	16,352	35.68	
CPI	Desh Raj	3,000	6.55	
Independent	Naurata Ram	1,640	3.58	
Independent	Bhagat Dass	727	1.59	
Margin of victory		7,637	16.66	
Turnout		45,836	69.25	
Registered electors		67,514		
JP win (new seat)				

== See also ==
- List of constituencies of the Haryana Legislative Assembly
- Yamunanagar district
