= Safidon Assembly constituency =

Legislative Assembly constituency in Haryana State, India

Coordinates: 29.41°N 76.66°E

Safidon
- Constituency No. 35 for the Haryana Legislative Assembly

Constituency details
- Country: India
- Region: North India
- State: Haryana
- District: Jind
- Lok Sabha constituency: Sonipat
- Total electors: 1,95,650
- Reservation: None

Member of Legislative Assembly
- 15th Haryana Legislative Assembly
- Incumbent Ram Kumar Gautam
- Party: Bhartiya Janata Party

Safidon Assembly constituency is one of the 90 Legislative Assembly constituencies of Haryana state in India.

It is part of Jind district. Ram Kumar Gautam is the incumbent MLA from the constituency.

== Members of the Legislative Assembly ==
Year	Member	Party
1967	S. Krishan	Indian National Congress
1968	Satya Narain	Vishal Haryana Party
1972	Dhajja Ram	Indian National Congress
1977	Ram Krishan	Janata Party
1982	Kundan Lal	Indian National Congress
1987	Sardul Singh	Independent
1991	Bachan Singh	Indian National Congress
1996	Ram Phal Kundu	Samata Party
2000	Ram Phal Kundu	Indian National Lok Dal
2005	Bachan Singh	Independent
2009	Kali Ram Patwari	Indian National Lok Dal
2014	Jasbir Deswal	Independent
2019	Subhash Gangoli	Indian National Congress
2024	Ram Kumar Gautam	Bharatiya Janata Party

== Election results ==
=== Assembly Election 2024 ===
2024 Haryana Legislative Assembly election: Safidon
Party	Candidate	Votes	%	±%
BJP	Ram Kumar Gautam	58,983	40.22%	▲0.63
INC	Subhash Gangoli	54,946	37.47%	▼4.81
Independent	Jasbir Deswal	20,114	13.72%	New
Independent	Bachan Singh Arya	8,807	6.01%	New
BSP	Pinki Kundu	822	0.56%	▼0.94
JJP	Sushil Bairagi	814	0.56%	▼5.16
NOTA	None of the Above	172	0.12%	New
Margin of victory		4,037	2.75%	▲0.06
Turnout		1,46,655	75.00%	▼0.80
Registered electors		1,95,650		▲9.03
BJP gain from INC		Swing	▼2.06	

=== Assembly Election 2019 ===
2019 Haryana Legislative Assembly election: Safidon
Party	Candidate	Votes	%	±%
INC	Subhash Gangoli	57,468	42.28%	▲23.47
BJP	Bachan Singh	53,810	39.58%	▲18.73
JJP	Dayanand Kundu	7,772	5.72%	
Independent	Rajbir Sharma	7,361	5.42%	
LSP	Vijay Saini	5,617	4.13%	
BSP	Jagdish Bhukal	2,036	1.50%	▼13.31
INLD	Joginder Kalwa	1,189	0.87%	▼18.49
Margin of victory		3,658	2.69%	▲1.63
Turnout		1,35,936	75.80%	▼6.68
Registered electors		1,79,332		▲10.38
INC gain from Independent		Swing	▲20.36	

=== Assembly Election 2014 ===
2014 Haryana Legislative Assembly election: Safidon
Party	Candidate	Votes	%	±%
Independent	Jasbir Deswal	29,369	21.91%	
BJP	Dr.Vandana Sharma	27,947	20.85%	▲12.87
INLD	Kali Ram Patwari	25,958	19.37%	▼16.09
INC	Bachan Singh	25,204	18.81%	▲0.65
BSP	Karmvir Saini	19,843	14.81%	▲1.56
Independent	Ilam Singh	1,528	1.14%	
HJCPV	Shyam Singh	1,130	0.84%	
NOTA	None of the Above	747	0.56%	
Independent	Satpal Sharma	681	0.51%	
Margin of victory		1,422	1.06%	▼13.11
Turnout		1,34,014	82.48%	▲4.28
Registered electors		1,62,474		▲16.69
Independent gain from INLD		Swing	▼13.55	

=== Assembly Election 2009 ===
2009 Haryana Legislative Assembly election: Safidon
Party	Candidate	Votes	%	±%
INLD	Kali Ram Patwari	38,618	35.46%	▲17.83
Independent	Bachan Singh	23,182	21.29%	
INC	Ram Kishan	19,771	18.16%	▼7.99
BSP	Suresh Kaushik	14,421	13.24%	▲12.09
BJP	Raj Kumar	8,697	7.99%	▲4.42
HJC(BL)	Jai Bhagwan Sharma	1,123	1.03%	
Independent	Parveen	767	0.70%	
Independent	Suresh	730	0.67%	
Margin of victory		15,436	14.18%	▼3.52
Turnout		1,08,894	78.21%	▼0.33
Registered electors		1,39,236		▲9.65
INLD gain from Independent		Swing	▼8.38	

=== Assembly Election 2005 ===
2005 Haryana Legislative Assembly election: Safidon
Party	Candidate	Votes	%	±%
Independent	Bachan Singh	43,721	43.84%	
INC	Karmvir Saini	26,077	26.15%	▼17.01
INLD	Ramphal Kundu	17,584	17.63%	▼35.3
BJP	Vijay Pal Singh	3,557	3.57%	
BRP	Rajpal Singh	3,506	3.52%	
Independent	Subhash Gangoli	1,680	1.68%	
BSP	Sardul Singh	1,152	1.16%	▼1.26
Independent	Naresh Kumar	929	0.93%	
Independent	Karambir	537	0.54%	
Margin of victory		17,644	17.69%	▲7.92
Turnout		99,725	78.54%	▲4.64
Registered electors		1,26,978		▲9.44
Independent gain from INLD		Swing	▼9.09	

=== Assembly Election 2000 ===
2000 Haryana Legislative Assembly election: Safidon
Party	Candidate	Votes	%	±%
INLD	Ram Phal	45,382	52.93%	
INC	Bachan Singh	37,004	43.16%	▲24.2
BSP	Surat Singh	2,071	2.42%	▼3.84
HVP	Vijender Yogi	585	0.68%	▼19.61
Margin of victory		8,378	9.77%	▲4.84
Turnout		85,742	74.40%	▼0.30
Registered electors		1,16,025		▲1.00
INLD gain from SAP		Swing	▲27.70	

=== Assembly Election 1996 ===
1996 Haryana Legislative Assembly election: Safidon
Party	Candidate	Votes	%	±%
SAP	Ramphal S/O Jodha Ram	21,502	25.22%	
HVP	Ranbir Singh	17,301	20.30%	▲9.43
Independent	Kamal	16,285	19.10%	
INC	Bachan Singh	16,164	18.96%	▼13.14
BSP	Bal Ram	5,332	6.25%	
Janhit Morcha	Hem Lata	4,722	5.54%	
Independent	Paras Ram	1,109	1.30%	
Margin of victory		4,201	4.93%	▲1.14
Turnout		85,245	76.81%	▲6.52
Registered electors		1,14,879		▲13.30
SAP gain from INC		Swing	▼6.87	

=== Assembly Election 1991 ===
1991 Haryana Legislative Assembly election: Safidon
Party	Candidate	Votes	%	±%
INC	Bachan Singh	22,030	32.10%	▲9.72
JP	Ram Phal	19,433	28.31%	
Independent	Bani Ram	8,863	12.91%	
HVP	Dhajja Ram	7,460	10.87%	
Independent	Ram Bhaj	3,701	5.39%	
Kalyan Morcha	Ram Kumar	1,570	2.29%	
Independent	Madan	1,396	2.03%	
BJP	Prem Chand	1,313	1.91%	
Independent	Sultan	829	1.21%	
Independent	Jasbir Singh	679	0.99%	
Margin of victory		2,597	3.78%	▼36.89
Turnout		68,633	70.35%	▼0.95
Registered electors		1,01,396		▲5.89
INC gain from Independent		Swing	▼30.95	

=== Assembly Election 1987 ===
1987 Haryana Legislative Assembly election: Safidon
Party	Candidate	Votes	%	±%
Independent	Sardul Singh	41,441	63.05%	
INC	Kundan Lal	14,709	22.38%	▼8.9
LKD	Ram Chander Jangra	4,897	7.45%	▼11.23
Independent	Subhash Kumar	1,201	1.83%	
Independent	Devi Chand	1,027	1.56%	
Independent	Charan Singh Dhank	933	1.42%	
VHP	Anil Kumar Ankush	360	0.55%	
Independent	Jagdish	310	0.47%	
Margin of victory		26,732	40.67%	▲28.08
Turnout		65,724	69.34%	▼3.09
Registered electors		95,755		▲24.17
Independent gain from INC		Swing	▲31.77	

=== Assembly Election 1982 ===
1982 Haryana Legislative Assembly election: Safidon
Party	Candidate	Votes	%	±%
INC	Kundan Lal	17,303	31.28%	▲14.81
LKD	Satvir Singh	10,335	18.68%	
Independent	Randhri Singh Kalwa Wala	6,554	11.85%	
Independent	Sat Narain	6,121	11.07%	
Independent	Inder Singh	5,801	10.49%	
Independent	Vaid Shree Krishan	4,226	7.64%	
Independent	Khusi Ram	853	1.54%	
Independent	Ram Kumar	657	1.19%	
JP	Lal Chand	527	0.95%	▼42.39
Independent	Randhir	519	0.94%	
Independent	Kartar Singh	471	0.85%	
Margin of victory		6,968	12.60%	▼14.28
Turnout		55,316	73.08%	▲4.98
Registered electors		77,116		▲17.85
INC gain from JP		Swing	▼12.06	

=== Assembly Election 1977 ===
1977 Haryana Legislative Assembly election: Safidon
Party	Candidate	Votes	%	±%
JP	Ram Krishan	18,930	43.34%	
INC	Pratap Singh	7,192	16.47%	▼29.39
Independent	Kulbir Singh	5,365	12.28%	
Independent	Inder Singh	3,082	7.06%	
Independent	Jagat Singh	2,672	6.12%	
VHP	Chander Bhan	2,387	5.46%	▼40.14
Independent	Jai Narain	2,312	5.29%	
Independent	Jagdish	1,193	2.73%	
Independent	Rakam Singh	253	0.58%	
Margin of victory		11,738	26.87%	▲26.62
Turnout		43,678	67.52%	▼6.27
Registered electors		65,434		▲11.95
JP gain from INC		Swing	▼2.52	

=== Assembly Election 1972 ===
1972 Haryana Legislative Assembly election: Safidon
Party	Candidate	Votes	%	±%
INC	Dhajja Ram	19,570	45.86%	▲3.69
VHP	Sat Narain	19,462	45.60%	▼4.03
Independent	Om Parkash	1,952	4.57%	
Independent	Roop Chand	1,065	2.50%	
SSP	Laxmi Datt	628	1.47%	
Margin of victory		108	0.25%	▼7.21
Turnout		42,677	75.03%	▲14.82
Registered electors		58,448		▲13.34
INC gain from VHP		Swing	▼3.77	

=== Assembly Election 1968 ===
1968 Haryana Legislative Assembly election: Safidon
Party	Candidate	Votes	%	±%
VHP	Satya Narain	14,895	49.63%	
INC	Ram Kishan	12,655	42.17%	▼6.5
Independent	Hari Singh	1,510	5.03%	
ABJS	Gyan Chand	952	3.17%	▼2.32
Margin of victory		2,240	7.46%	▼8.96
Turnout		30,012	59.69%	▼13.42
Registered electors		51,569		▲1.60
VHP gain from INC		Swing	▲0.96	

=== Assembly Election 1967 ===
1967 Haryana Legislative Assembly election: Safidon
Party	Candidate	Votes	%	±%
INC	S. Krishan	17,692	48.67%	
Independent	S. Narain	11,721	32.24%	
ABJS	S. Bhan	1,998	5.50%	
Independent	H. Chand	1,917	5.27%	
Independent	M. Ram	1,840	5.06%	
Independent	S. Singh	718	1.98%	
CPI(M)	M. Singh	464	1.28%	
Margin of victory		5,971	16.43%	
Turnout		36,350	75.65%	
Registered electors		50,758		
INC win (new seat)				

== See also ==
- List of constituencies of the Haryana Legislative Assembly
- Jind district
