= Renu Bala =

Indian politician

Member of the Haryana Legislative Assembly
- Incumbent
- Assumed office 2019
- Preceded by: Balwant Singh
- Constituency: Sadhaura

Personal details
- Party: Indian National Congress

Renu Bala (born 1980) is an Indian politician from Haryana and a member of the Indian National Congress. She was elected as a member of the Haryana Legislative Assembly from Sadhaura Assembly constituency, a seat reserved for the Scheduled Caste community.

== Early life and education ==
Bala is from Jagadhri, Haryana. She completed Class 12 and discontinued her studies while doing B.A. First year at a college affiliated with Punjab University, Chandigarh in April 2001.

== Career ==
Bala won from Sadhaura Assembly constituency representing Indian National Congress in the 2019 Haryana Legislative Assembly election. She polled 65,806 votes and defeated her nearest rival, Balwant Singh of the Bharatiya Janata Party, by a margin of 17,020 votes. Bala again won from Sadhaura Assembly constituency representing Indian National Congress in the 2024 Haryana Legislative Assembly election. She polled 57,534 votes and again defeated her nearest rival, Balwant Singh of the BJP, by a reduced margin of 1,699 votes.

In April 2026, Bala was suspended by the Congress for cross-voting in the 2026 Rajya Sabha elections. Her husband Rishi Pal joined the BJP in June.
