= Garhi Sampla-Kiloi Assembly constituency =

Constituency of the Haryana legislative assembly in India

Coordinates: 28.86°N 76.72°E

Garhi Sampla-Kiloi
- Constituency No. 61 for the Haryana Legislative Assembly
- Bhupinder Singh Hooda

Constituency details
- Country: India
- Region: North India
- State: Haryana
- District: Rohtak
- Total electors: 2,22,273
- Reservation: None

Member of Legislative Assembly
- 15th Haryana Legislative Assembly
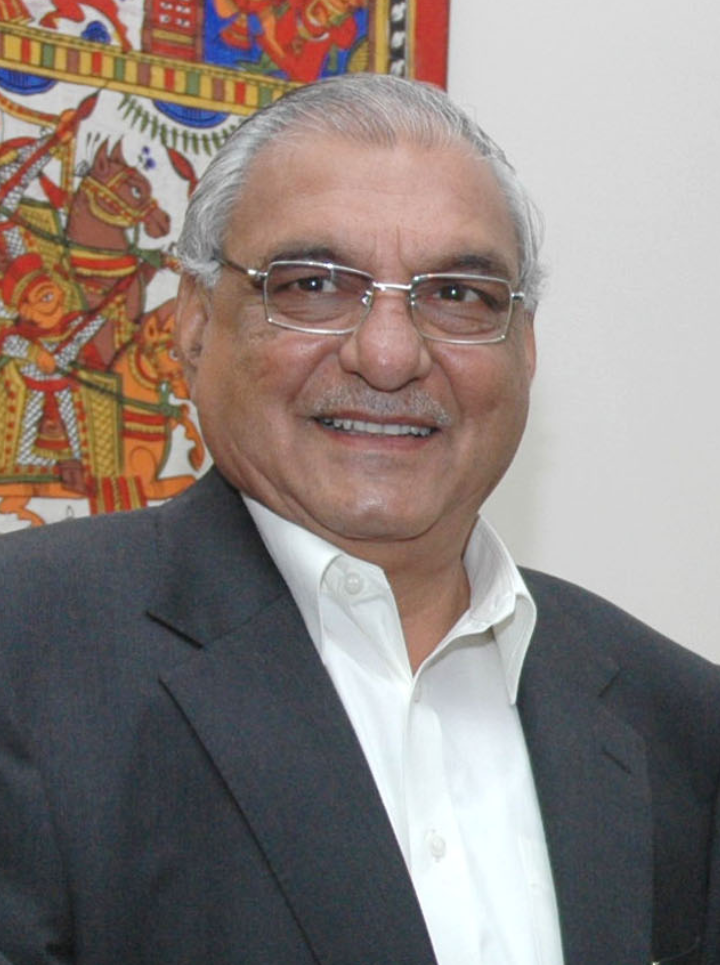
- Incumbent Bhupinder Singh Hooda
- Party: Indian National Congress
- Elected year: 2024

Garhi Sampla-Kiloi Assembly constituency is one of the 90 assembly constituencies of Haryana a northern state of India. It is also part of Rohtak Lok Sabha constituency.

== List of Members of Legislative Assembly ==
Year	Member	Party
Known as Kiloi after delimitation
1967	Mahant Shreyonath	Independent
1968	Ranbir Singh Hooda	Indian National Congress
1972	Mahant Shreyonath	Indian National Congress (O)
1977	Hari Chand Hooda	Janata Party
1982	Hari Chand Hooda	Lok Dal
1987	Krishan Hooda	Lok Dal
1991	Krishan Hooda	Indian National Congress
1996	Krishan Hooda	Samata Party
2000	Bhupinder Singh Hooda	Indian National Congress
2005	Krishan Hooda	Indian National Congress
2005*	Bhupinder Singh Hooda	Indian National Congress
Known as Garhi Sampla-Kiloi after delimitation
2009	Bhupinder Singh Hooda	Indian National Congress
2014	Bhupinder Singh Hooda	Indian National Congress
2019	Bhupinder Singh Hooda	Indian National Congress
2024	Bhupinder Singh Hooda	Indian National Congress

- By-poll

== Election results ==
=== Assembly Election 2024 ===
2024 Haryana Legislative Assembly election: Garhi Sampla-Kiloi
Party	Candidate	Votes	%	±%
INC	Bhupinder Singh Hooda	108,539	72.72	▲6.91
BJP	Manju	37,074	24.84	▼1.72
INLD	Krishan	1,496	1.00	▲0.03
AAP	Parveen	895	0.60	▲0.12
NOTA	None of the Above	313	0.21	New
Margin of victory		71,465	47.88	▲8.62
Turnout		1,49,248	67.26	▼5.11
Registered electors		2,22,273		▲8.12
INC hold		Swing	▲6.91	

=== Assembly Election 2019 ===
2019 Haryana Legislative Assembly election: Garhi Sampla-Kiloi
Party	Candidate	Votes	%	±%
INC	Bhupinder Singh Hooda	97,755	65.82	▲8.54
BJP	Satish Nandal	39,443	26.56	▲10.87
JJP	Sandeep Hooda	5,437	3.66	New
LSP	Kamlesh Kumar Saini	2,433	1.64	New
INLD	Krishan	1,447	0.97	▼22.81
Margin of victory		58,312	39.26	▲5.77
Turnout		1,48,528	72.36	▼1.45
Registered electors		2,05,251		▲7.54
INC hold		Swing	▲8.54	

=== Assembly Election 2014 ===
2014 Haryana Legislative Assembly election: Garhi Sampla-Kiloi
Party	Candidate	Votes	%	±%
INC	Bhupinder Singh Hooda	80,693	57.28	▼22.49
INLD	Satish Kumar Nandal	33,508	23.78	▲8.03
BJP	Dharamvir Hooda	22,101	15.69	▲14.86
HJC(BL)	Bijender Sharma	1,197	0.85	▲0.25
BSP	Suresh	1,068	0.76	▼1.14
Margin of victory		47,185	33.49	▼30.52
Turnout		1,40,881	73.81	▲5.15
Registered electors		1,90,869		▲16.35
INC hold		Swing	▼22.49	

=== Assembly Election 2009 ===
2009 Haryana Legislative Assembly election: Garhi Sampla-Kiloi
Party	Candidate	Votes	%	±%
INC	Bhupinder Singh Hooda	89,849	79.77	New
INLD	Satish Kumar Nandal	17,749	15.76	New
BSP	Fateh Singh	2,135	1.90	New
BJP	Som Dev	936	0.83	New
HJC(BL)	Suresh Kumar	676	0.60	New
Margin of victory		72,100	64.01	
Turnout		1,12,632	68.66	
Registered electors		1,64,050		
INC win (new seat)				

== Kiloi (1967-2005) ==
=== Assembly Election 2005 ===
2005 Haryana Legislative Assembly election: Kiloi
Party	Candidate	Votes	%	±%
INC	Krishan Hooda	56,716	66.54%	▲13.06
INLD	Prem Singh	21,853	25.64%	
Margin of victory		34,863	40.9%	
Turnout		85,076	67.27%	
Registered electors		1,26,468		
INC hold		Swing		

=== Assembly Election 2000 ===
2000 Haryana Legislative Assembly election: Kiloi
Party	Candidate	Votes	%	±%
INC	Bhupinder Singh Hooda	39,513	53.48%	▲29.09
INLD	Dharam Pal	27,555	37.30%	New
Independent	Ram Bhaj Hooda	3,027	4.10%	New
Independent	Sarla Kumari	1,311	1.77%	New
BSP	Mahender Kumar	901	1.22%	▼0.42
Independent	Hari Singh	643	0.87%	New
Independent	Suraj Mal	409	0.55%	New
Margin of victory		11,958	16.19%	▲4.36
Turnout		73,883	70.75%	▲4.52
Registered electors		1,04,531		▲0.12
INC gain from SAP		Swing	▲13.11	

=== Assembly Election 1996 ===
1996 Haryana Legislative Assembly election: Kiloi
Party	Candidate	Votes	%	±%
SAP	Krishan Hooda	27,884	40.37%	New
HVP	Ram Phool	19,719	28.55%	New
INC	Krishan Murti	16,846	24.39%	▼20.62
BSP	Duli Chand	1,134	1.64%	New
Independent	Ratan	914	1.32%	New
Independent	Khazan Singh	365	0.53%	New
Margin of victory		8,165	11.82%	▲6.49
Turnout		69,073	68.72%	▲3.62
Registered electors		1,04,405		▲7.78
SAP gain from INC		Swing	▼4.64	

=== Assembly Election 1991 ===
1991 Haryana Legislative Assembly election: Kiloi
Party	Candidate	Votes	%	±%
INC	Krishan Murti	27,265	45.01%	▲11.68
JP	Krishan Hooda	24,038	39.68%	New
CPI(M)	Raghuvir	4,687	7.74%	New
Independent	Ishwar	1,326	2.19%	New
BJP	Krishna Chaudhary	871	1.44%	New
Independent	Satbir Singh	816	1.35%	New
Independent	Ram Chand	813	1.34%	New
Margin of victory		3,227	5.33%	▼21.55
Turnout		60,580	64.52%	▼3.48
Registered electors		96,866		▲14.42
INC gain from LKD		Swing	▼15.20	

=== Assembly Election 1987 ===
1987 Haryana Legislative Assembly election: Kiloi
Party	Candidate	Votes	%	±%
LKD	Krishan Hooda	33,650	60.20%	▲18.44
INC	Bhupinder Singh Hooda	18,627	33.32%	▲1.17
VHP	Ajit Singh	1,117	2.00%	New
Independent	Chandrawati	1,095	1.96%	New
Independent	Hawa Singh	674	1.21%	New
Margin of victory		15,023	26.88%	▲17.27
Turnout		55,895	68.02%	▼1.52
Registered electors		84,659		▲20.66
LKD hold		Swing	▲18.44	

=== Assembly Election 1982 ===
1982 Haryana Legislative Assembly election: Kiloi
Party	Candidate	Votes	%	±%
LKD	Hari Chand	19,793	41.76%	New
INC	Bhupinder Singh Hooda	15,240	32.16%	▲2.39
Independent	Shero Nath	8,680	18.32%	New
Independent	Rajinder Singh	2,436	5.14%	New
JP	Dharam Vir	579	1.22%	▼53.5
Independent	Maha Singh	303	0.64%	New
Margin of victory		4,553	9.61%	▼15.35
Turnout		47,392	68.54%	▲6.79
Registered electors		70,164		▲20.52
LKD gain from JP		Swing	▼12.96	

=== Assembly Election 1977 ===
1977 Haryana Legislative Assembly election: Kiloi
Party	Candidate	Votes	%	±%
JP	Hari Chand	19,357	54.72%	New
INC	Ranbir Singh Hooda	10,530	29.77%	▼15.87
Independent	Surat Singh	3,906	11.04%	New
Independent	Amed Singh	812	2.30%	New
Independent	Radhey Krishan	420	1.19%	New
Independent	Puran Singh	347	0.98%	New
Margin of victory		8,827	24.95%	▲16.22
Turnout		35,372	61.33%	▼14.63
Registered electors		58,218		▲1.65
JP gain from INC(O)		Swing	▲0.36	

=== Assembly Election 1972 ===
1972 Haryana Legislative Assembly election: Kiloi
Party	Candidate	Votes	%	±%
INC(O)	Shreyo Nath	23,474	54.37%	New
INC	Partap Singh	19,704	45.63%	▼6.29
Margin of victory		3,770	8.73%	▲3.95
Turnout		43,178	76.93%	▲5.93
Registered electors		57,271		
INC(O) gain from INC		Swing		

=== Assembly Election 1968 ===
1968 Haryana Legislative Assembly election: Kiloi
Party	Candidate	Votes	%	±%
INC	Ranbir Singh Hooda	18,751	51.93%	▲20.27
Independent	Shreyo Nath	17,025	47.15%	▼6.63
Independent	Balwan	335	0.93%	New
Margin of victory		1,726	4.78%	▼17.35
Turnout		36,111	70.60%	▼9.49
Registered electors		51,987		▲4.72
INC gain from Independent		Swing		

=== Assembly Election 1967 ===
1967 Haryana Legislative Assembly election: Kiloi
Party	Candidate	Votes	%	±%
Independent	Shreyo Nath	21,079	53.78%	New
INC	R. Singh	12,406	31.65%	New
ABJS	R. Bhaj	4,771	12.17%	New
RPI	M. Ram	633	1.62%	New
Independent	Munshi	219	0.56%	New
Margin of victory		8,673	22.13%	
Turnout		39,195	81.07%	
Registered electors		49,644		
Independent win (new seat)				
