= Salhawas Assembly constituency =

Constituency of the Haryana legislative assembly in India

Coordinates: 28.14°N 76.67°E

- Former constituency for the Haryana Legislative Assembly

Constituency details
- Country: India
- Region: North India
- State: Haryana
- Established: 1967
- Abolished: 2005
- Total electors: 1,22,521

Salhawas Assembly constituency is a former constituency of the Haryana Legislative Assembly, in Haryana, India.

== Members of Legislative Assembly ==
Year	Member	Party
1967	P. Chand	Indian National Congress
1968	Shakuntla	Vishal Haryana Party
1972	Phul Singh	Indian National Congress
1977	Ram Narain	Janata Party
1982	Hukam Singh	Independent politician
1987	Ram Narain	Lokdal
1991	Zile Singh	Janata Party
1996	Dharmavir	Haryana Vikas Party
2000	Anita Yadav	Indian National Congress
2005	Anita Yadav	Indian National Congress

== Election results ==
=== Assembly Election 2005 ===
2005 Haryana Legislative Assembly election: Salhawas
Party	Candidate	Votes	%	±%
INC	Anita Yadav	45,755	51.88%	▼1.56
INLD	Zile Singh	29,976	33.99%	▼2.80
BJP	Laxman Singh	4,994	5.66%	New
BSP	Mohit	2,600	2.95%	New
SP	Saroj Devi	2,536	2.88%	▲2.12
Independent	Sajan Singh	995	1.13%	New
NCP	Karan Singh	386	0.44%	New
Margin of victory		15,779	17.89%	▲1.24
Turnout		88,188	71.98%	▲1.16
Registered electors		1,22,521		▲13.39
INC hold		Swing	▼1.56	

=== Assembly Election 2000 ===
2000 Haryana Legislative Assembly election: Salhawas
Party	Candidate	Votes	%	±%
INC	Anita Yadav	40,893	53.44%	▲36.26
INLD	Hukam Singh	28,151	36.79%	New
Independent	Jagat	3,132	4.09%	New
HVP	Devender Singh	2,859	3.74%	▼37.80
Independent	Prem Bhushan	589	0.77%	New
SP	Balbir	582	0.76%	▼0.13
Margin of victory		12,742	16.65%	▼7.70
Turnout		76,520	70.82%	▲9.31
Registered electors		1,08,055		▼0.85
INC gain from HVP		Swing	▲11.90	

=== Assembly Election 1996 ===
1996 Haryana Legislative Assembly election: Salhawas
Party	Candidate	Votes	%	±%
HVP	Dharmavir	27,840	41.54%	▲30.70
INC	Suraj Bhan S/O Chandram	11,517	17.18%	▼12.64
Independent	Amar Singh	8,176	12.20%	New
SAP	Rajpal	6,838	10.20%	New
Independent	Hukam Singh	5,231	7.80%	New
BSP	Ram Niwas Shastri	2,251	3.36%	New
Independent	Rajender	694	1.04%	New
Independent	Ravi Parkash	607	0.91%	New
SP	Vikram Singh	594	0.89%	New
Independent	Ghisa Ram	399	0.60%	New
Independent	Kamlesh	356	0.53%	New
Margin of victory		16,323	24.35%	▲23.28
Turnout		67,026	63.76%	▲2.54
Registered electors		1,08,978		▲7.60
HVP gain from JP		Swing	▲10.64	

=== Assembly Election 1991 ===
1991 Haryana Legislative Assembly election: Salhawas
Party	Candidate	Votes	%	±%
JP	Zile Singh	18,448	30.89%	New
INC	Narvir Singh	17,807	29.82%	▲9.26
HVP	Babru Bahan	6,470	10.83%	New
Independent	Hukam Singh	5,945	9.96%	New
Independent	Amar Singh	5,055	8.46%	New
BJP	Veer Kumar	2,139	3.58%	New
Independent	Jai Singh	690	1.16%	New
Independent	Ram Kumar	474	0.79%	New
Independent	Birbal	421	0.70%	New
Independent	Ramehar	398	0.67%	New
Independent	Lal Singh	344	0.58%	New
Margin of victory		641	1.07%	▼37.35
Turnout		59,718	61.73%	▼2.68
Registered electors		1,01,283		▲8.57
JP gain from LKD		Swing	▼28.09	

=== Assembly Election 1987 ===
1987 Haryana Legislative Assembly election: Salhawas
Party	Candidate	Votes	%	±%
LKD	Ram Narain	33,920	58.98%	▲53.12
INC	Raj Singh	11,823	20.56%	▼4.89
Independent	Zile Singh	5,301	9.22%	New
VHP	Vir Kumar	1,975	3.43%	New
Independent	Maha Singh	1,460	2.54%	New
Independent	Balwant	745	1.30%	New
Independent	Karan Singh	605	1.05%	New
Independent	Sumer S/O Sardar Singh	336	0.58%	New
Margin of victory		22,097	38.42%	▲36.00
Turnout		57,509	64.06%	▼1.33
Registered electors		93,289		▲19.11
LKD gain from Independent		Swing	▲27.06	

=== Assembly Election 1982 ===
1982 Haryana Legislative Assembly election: Salhawas
Party	Candidate	Votes	%	±%
Independent	Hukam Singh	15,746	31.92%	New
Independent	Ram Narain	14,551	29.50%	New
INC	Rai Singh Yadav	12,554	25.45%	▲19.63
LKD	Jorawar Singh	2,891	5.86%	New
Independent	Hari Ram Arya	1,329	2.69%	New
Independent	Balwant	924	1.87%	New
Independent	Chattru	554	1.12%	New
Independent	Dharm Pal Safedi Wala	391	0.79%	New
Margin of victory		1,195	2.42%	▼38.41
Turnout		49,328	64.31%	▲6.92
Registered electors		78,322		▲20.83
Independent gain from JP		Swing	▼25.82	

=== Assembly Election 1977 ===
1977 Haryana Legislative Assembly election: Salhawas
Party	Candidate	Votes	%	±%
JP	Ram Narain	20,982	57.74%	New
Independent	Raj Singh	6,145	16.91%	New
VHP	Dil Sukh Man	4,702	12.94%	▼24.69
INC	Ram Singh Jakhar	2,116	5.82%	▼44.20
Independent	Mahabir Prasad	1,117	3.07%	New
SUCI(C)	Balwant	740	2.04%	New
Independent	Chaman Lal	352	0.97%	New
Independent	Dalip	184	0.51%	New
Margin of victory		14,837	40.83%	▲28.43
Turnout		36,338	56.95%	▼4.78
Registered electors		64,821		▼12.14
JP gain from INC		Swing	▲7.71	

=== Assembly Election 1972 ===
1972 Haryana Legislative Assembly election: Salhawas
Party	Candidate	Votes	%	±%
INC	Phul Singh	22,455	50.03%	▲8.37
VHP	Shakuntla Devi	16,889	37.63%	▼9.53
Independent	Chand Ram	5,542	12.35%	New
Margin of victory		5,566	12.40%	▲6.90
Turnout		44,886	63.86%	▲17.14
Registered electors		73,777		▲12.99
INC gain from VHP		Swing		

=== Assembly Election 1968 ===
1968 Haryana Legislative Assembly election: Salhawas
Party	Candidate	Votes	%	±%
VHP	Shakuntla	13,455	47.16%	New
INC	Phul Singh	11,885	41.65%	▲4.06
SWA	Raj Singh	3,192	11.19%	New
Margin of victory		1,570	5.50%	▲3.01
Turnout		28,532	44.88%	▼15.40
Registered electors		65,295		▲2.02
VHP gain from INC		Swing		

=== Assembly Election 1967 ===
1967 Haryana Legislative Assembly election: Salhawas
Party	Candidate	Votes	%	±%
INC	P. Chand	14,219	37.60%	New
Independent	Amar Singh	13,278	35.11%	New
Independent	R. Singh	5,163	13.65%	New
Independent	S.Singh	1,847	4.88%	New
RPI	Sumera	796	2.10%	New
ABJS	D .Singh	678	1.79%	New
Independent	C. Bhan	621	1.64%	New
Independent	J. Ram	497	1.31%	New
Independent	R. Kanwar	479	1.27%	New
Independent	M. Lal	243	0.64%	New
Margin of victory		941	2.49%	
Turnout		37,821	62.59%	
Registered electors		64,002		
INC win (new seat)				

== See also ==
- Salhawas
- List of constituencies of the Haryana Legislative Assembly
