= Ghirai Assembly constituency =

Constituency of the Haryana legislative assembly in India

Coordinates: 29.24°N 75.89°E

- Former constituency for the Haryana Legislative Assembly

Constituency details
- Country: India
- Region: North India
- State: Haryana
- Established: 1977
- Abolished: 2005
- Total electors: 1,29,731

Ghirai Assembly constituency was an assembly constituency in the India state of Haryana.

== Members of the Legislative Assembly ==
Election	Member	Party
1977	Kanwal Singh	Janata Party
1982	Kanwal Singh	Lokdal
1987	Atma Ram	Lokdal
1991	Chhatarpal Singh	Indian National Congress
1996	Kanwal Singh	Haryana Vikas Party
2000	Puran Singh	Indian National Lok Dal
2005	Prof. Chhattar Pal Singh	Indian National Congress

== Election results ==
=== Assembly Election 2005 ===
2005 Haryana Legislative Assembly election: Ghirai
Party	Candidate	Votes	%	±%
INC	Prof. Chhattar Pal Singh	53,186	51.73%	▲7.95
Independent	Jogi Ram Sihag Sisai	26,742	26.01%	New
INLD	Puran Singh Dabra	16,567	16.11%	▼33.07
BJP	Colonel Sahi Ram Kalkal	2,154	2.10%	New
LJP	Anil Sihag Jogi	986	0.96%	New
Independent	Raj Kumar	894	0.87%	New
BSP	Rajesh Mahandia	877	0.85%	▼1.14
Independent	Manphool Singh Poonia	558	0.54%	New
Margin of victory		26,444	25.72%	▲20.31
Turnout		1,02,814	79.25%	▲0.98
Registered electors		1,29,731		▲17.54
INC gain from INLD		Swing	▲2.54	

=== Assembly Election 2000 ===
2000 Haryana Legislative Assembly election: Ghirai
Party	Candidate	Votes	%	±%
INLD	Puran Singh	42,491	49.19%	New
INC	Prof. Chhattar Pal Singh	37,821	43.78%	▲31.58
HVP	Kanwal Singh	3,944	4.57%	▼22.64
BSP	Om Prakash Nimbal	1,722	1.99%	▼3.32
Margin of victory		4,670	5.41%	▲4.99
Turnout		86,387	79.31%	▲7.38
Registered electors		1,10,373		▼0.98
INLD gain from HVP		Swing	▲21.98	

=== Assembly Election 1996 ===
1996 Haryana Legislative Assembly election: Ghirai
Party	Candidate	Votes	%	±%
HVP	Kanwal Singh	21,497	27.20%	New
Independent	Chhatar Pal Singh	21,171	26.79%	New
SAP	Puran Singh	12,551	15.88%	New
INC	Suresh Kumar S/O Jagan Nath	9,638	12.20%	▼31.77
BSP	Krishna Devi	4,197	5.31%	New
Independent	Karan Singh	1,710	2.16%	New
AIIC(T)	Harpal	1,401	1.77%	New
Independent	Maha Singh	1,288	1.63%	New
Independent	Ishwar S/O Devi Singh	848	1.07%	New
JD	Anil	749	0.95%	▼7.20
Independent	Mahabir	435	0.55%	New
Margin of victory		326	0.41%	▼2.75
Turnout		79,023	73.74%	▲5.48
Registered electors		1,11,470		▲7.12
HVP gain from INC		Swing	▼16.76	

=== Assembly Election 1991 ===
1991 Haryana Legislative Assembly election: Ghirai
Party	Candidate	Votes	%	±%
INC	Chhatarpal Singh	29,927	43.97%	▲31.69
JP	Devi Lal	27,773	40.80%	New
JD	Ishwar Singh	5,544	8.14%	New
Independent	Udebir	2,329	3.42%	New
BJP	Pardeep Kumar	1,363	2.00%	New
Margin of victory		2,154	3.16%	▼27.27
Turnout		68,068	67.27%	▼7.36
Registered electors		1,04,062		▲8.46
INC gain from LKD		Swing	▼7.82	

=== Assembly Election 1987 ===
1987 Haryana Legislative Assembly election: Ghirai
Party	Candidate	Votes	%	±%
LKD	Atma Ram	36,157	51.79%	▲18.16
Independent	Suraesh Kumar	14,907	21.35%	New
INC	Kanwal Singh	8,571	12.28%	▼11.99
Independent	Shamsher Singh	6,123	8.77%	New
Independent	Bir Singh	1,446	2.07%	New
VHP	Ishawar Singh	1,045	1.50%	New
Margin of victory		21,250	30.44%	▲26.40
Turnout		69,814	73.95%	▲5.54
Registered electors		95,942		▲20.66
LKD hold		Swing	▲18.16	

=== Assembly Election 1982 ===
1982 Haryana Legislative Assembly election: Ghirai
Party	Candidate	Votes	%	±%
LKD	Kanwal Singh	17,975	33.63%	New
Independent	Suresh Kumar Mittal	15,814	29.58%	New
INC	Ishwar Singh	12,972	24.27%	▲19.62
Independent	Narender Singh Rana	2,749	5.14%	New
Independent	Balraj Singh	1,466	2.74%	New
Independent	Banarsi Dass	556	1.04%	New
Independent	Gulab Singh	547	1.02%	New
Independent	Baldeva	335	0.63%	New
Independent	Jagat Ram	325	0.61%	New
Independent	Randhir Singh	321	0.60%	New
Independent	Mewa Singh Bolan	313	0.59%	New
Margin of victory		2,161	4.04%	▼17.39
Turnout		53,456	68.52%	▲3.13
Registered electors		79,514		▲15.97
LKD gain from JP		Swing	▼9.58	

=== Assembly Election 1977 ===
1977 Haryana Legislative Assembly election: Ghirai
Party	Candidate	Votes	%	±%
JP	Kanwal Singh	18,991	43.21%	New
Independent	Suresh Chander	9,571	21.78%	New
Independent	Narender Singh	5,672	12.91%	New
Independent	Manphul Singh	2,172	4.94%	New
INC	Ishwar Singh	2,041	4.64%	New
Independent	Ram Kishan	1,712	3.90%	New
Independent	Ram Kumar	1,593	3.62%	New
Independent	Chander Singh	639	1.45%	New
Independent	Jagat Ram	634	1.44%	New
Independent	Dharam Singh	551	1.25%	New
Independent	Lehna Singh	295	0.67%	New
Margin of victory		9,420	21.43%	
Turnout		43,950	64.99%	
Registered electors		68,566		
JP win (new seat)				
