= Gharaunda Assembly constituency =

Legislative Assembly constituency in Haryana State, India

Coordinates: 29.54°N 76.97°E

Gharaunda
- Constituency No. 22 for the Haryana Legislative Assembly

Constituency details
- Country: India
- Region: North India
- State: Haryana
- District: Karnal
- Lok Sabha constituency: Karnal
- Total electors: 2,41,583
- Reservation: None

Member of Legislative Assembly
- 15th Haryana Legislative Assembly
- Incumbent Harvinder Kalyan
- Party: Bharatiya Janata Party

Gharaunda is one of the 90 Legislative Assembly constituencies of Haryana state in India.

It is part of Karnal district.

== Members of the Legislative Assembly ==
| Year | Member | Party |
|---|---|---|
| 1967 | M. Chand | Indian National Congress |
| 1968 | Randhir Singh | Bharatiya Jana Sangh |
| 1972 | Rulya Ram | Indian National Congress (O) |
| 1977 | Ram Pal Singh | Janata Party |
| 1982 | Vedpal Dhanda | Indian National Congress |
| 1987 | Piru Ram | Lokdal |
| 1991 | Ram Pal Singh | Indian National Congress |
| 1996 | Ramesh | Bharatiya Janata Party |
| 2000 | Ramesh Rana | Indian National Lok Dal |
| 2005 | Rekha Rana | Indian National Lok Dal |
| 2009 | Narender Sangwan | Indian National Lok Dal |
| 2014 | Harvinder Kalyan | Bharatiya Janata Party |
| 2019 | Harvinder Kalyan | Bharatiya Janata Party |
| 2024 | Harvinder Kalyan | Bharatiya Janata Party |

== Election results ==
=== Assembly Election 2024 ===
2024 Haryana Legislative Assembly election: Gharaunda
| Party | Candidate | Votes | % | ±% |
|---|---|---|---|---|
| BJP | Harvinder Kalyan | 87,236 | 49.92 | ▲3.21 |
| INC | Varinder Singh Rathore | 82,705 | 47.33 | ▲12.71 |
| INLD | Krishan Singh Alias Mannu Kashyap | 1,611 | 0.92 | ▼1.05 |
| NOTA | None of the Above | 456 | 0.26 | ▼0.34 |
| Margin of victory | | 4,531 | 2.59 | ▼9.50 |
| Turnout | | 1,74,738 | 72.13 | ▲5.88 |
| Registered electors | | 2,41,583 | | ▲11.54 |
| BJP hold | | Swing | ▲3.21 | |

=== Assembly Election 2019 ===
2019 Haryana Legislative Assembly election: Gharaunda
| Party | Candidate | Votes | % | ±% |
|---|---|---|---|---|
| BJP | Harvinder Kalyan | 67,209 | 46.71 | ▲11.21 |
| INC | Anil Kumar | 49,807 | 34.62 | ▲10.91 |
| JJP | Umed Singh Kashyap | 13,709 | 9.53 | |
| BSP | Dr. Mehar Singh | 5,456 | 3.79 | ▼8.53 |
| INLD | Maninder Rana | 2,841 | 1.97 | ▼22.04 |
| Independent | Jagpal Singh | 1,331 | 0.93 | |
| NOTA | Nota | 868 | 0.60 | |
| LSP | Shamsher Singh | 743 | 0.52 | |
| Margin of victory | | 17,402 | 12.10 | ▲0.60 |
| Turnout | | 1,43,876 | 66.24 | ▼14.76 |
| Registered electors | | 2,17,199 | | ▲13.05 |
| BJP hold | | Swing | ▲11.21 | |

=== Assembly Election 2014 ===
2014 Haryana Legislative Assembly election: Gharaunda
| Party | Candidate | Votes | % | ±% |
|---|---|---|---|---|
| BJP | Harvinder Kalyan | 55,247 | 35.50 | ▲29.22 |
| INLD | Narender Sangwan | 37,364 | 24.01 | ▼5.43 |
| INC | Virender Singh Rathore | 36,896 | 23.71 | ▼4.34 |
| BSP | Sohan Lal | 19,171 | 12.32 | ▼12.09 |
| HJC(BL) | Jai Singh Rana | 3,229 | 2.07 | ▲1.38 |
| Independent | Subhash Khurana | 1,031 | 0.66 | |
| Margin of victory | | 17,883 | 11.49 | ▲10.11 |
| Turnout | | 1,55,615 | 81.00 | ▲5.70 |
| Registered electors | | 1,92,125 | | ▲20.79 |
| BJP gain from INLD | | Swing | ▲6.07 | |

=== Assembly Election 2009 ===
2009 Haryana Legislative Assembly election: Gharaunda
| Party | Candidate | Votes | % | ±% |
|---|---|---|---|---|
| INLD | Narender Sangwan | 35,256 | 29.44 | ▲4.3 |
| INC | Varinder Singh Rathore | 33,596 | 28.05 | ▲9.98 |
| BSP | Harvinder Kalyan | 29,232 | 24.41 | ▲20.32 |
| BJP | Jai Pal Sharma | 7,523 | 6.28 | ▼1.69 |
| Independent | Krishan Sharma Bastara | 3,549 | 2.96 | |
| Independent | Karan Singh | 3,233 | 2.70 | |
| Independent | Ram Singh | 3,158 | 2.64 | |
| Independent | Subhash Khurana | 1,533 | 1.28 | |
| HJC(BL) | Dharampal Rana | 838 | 0.70 | |
| Margin of victory | | 1,660 | 1.39 | ▲1.37 |
| Turnout | | 1,19,769 | 75.30 | ▼1.10 |
| Registered electors | | 1,59,059 | | ▲21.04 |
| INLD hold | | Swing | ▲4.30 | |

=== Assembly Election 2005 ===
2005 Haryana Legislative Assembly election: Gharaunda
| Party | Candidate | Votes | % | ±% |
|---|---|---|---|---|
| INLD | Rekha Rana | 25,237 | 25.14 | ▼26.21 |
| Independent | Jai Pal Sharma | 25,216 | 25.12 | |
| INC | Varinder Singh Rathor | 18,137 | 18.07 | ▼1.37 |
| BRP | Ram Pal Singh | 17,141 | 17.07 | |
| BJP | Ramesh Kashyap | 8,006 | 7.97 | |
| BSP | Rampal Kashyap | 4,105 | 4.09 | ▲2.01 |
| Independent | Yash Pal | 792 | 0.79 | |
| Independent | Jujhar Singh Wahla | 681 | 0.68 | |
| CPI(ML)L | Sushma Kashyap | 590 | 0.59 | ▼0.29 |
| Margin of victory | | 21 | 0.02 | ▼27.70 |
| Turnout | | 1,00,389 | 76.39 | ▲5.11 |
| Registered electors | | 1,31,408 | | ▲10.64 |
| INLD hold | | Swing | ▼26.21 | |

=== Assembly Election 2000 ===
2000 Haryana Legislative Assembly election: Gharaunda
| Party | Candidate | Votes | % | ±% |
|---|---|---|---|---|
| INLD | Ramesh Rana | 43,479 | 51.35 | |
| Independent | Jai Pal Sharma | 20,009 | 23.63 | |
| INC | Rajender Singh | 16,460 | 19.44 | ▲5.12 |
| BSP | Ram Pal Kashyap | 1,761 | 2.08 | ▼2.31 |
| Independent | Sunehra | 768 | 0.91 | |
| CPI(ML)L | Ram Singh Kashyap | 742 | 0.88 | |
| NCP | Col. Mahant Avinash Sharma | 509 | 0.60 | |
| Independent | Dhajja Ram | 473 | 0.56 | |
| HVP | Baru Ram | 467 | 0.55 | |
| Margin of victory | | 23,470 | 27.72 | ▲27.71 |
| Turnout | | 84,668 | 71.34 | ▲1.72 |
| Registered electors | | 1,18,766 | | ▼1.18 |
| INLD gain from BJP | | Swing | ▲27.16 | |

=== Assembly Election 1996 ===
1996 Haryana Legislative Assembly election: Gharaunda
| Party | Candidate | Votes | % | ±% |
|---|---|---|---|---|
| BJP | Ramesh S/O Sulekh Chand | 20,230 | 24.19 | ▲10.29 |
| SAP | Ramesh Kumar Rana S/O Jagpal Singh | 20,219 | 24.18 | |
| INC | Ram Pal Singh | 11,973 | 14.32 | ▼13.6 |
| AIIC(T) | Ram Kishan | 8,367 | 10.01 | |
| JD | Ved Parkash | 6,719 | 8.04 | |
| Independent | Surinder Kumar | 4,170 | 4.99 | |
| SHS | Subash Chander | 3,833 | 4.58 | |
| BSP | Kesho Ram | 3,670 | 4.39 | |
| CPI(M) | Suba Singh | 720 | 0.86 | |
| Independent | Om Parkash | 499 | 0.60 | |
| Independent | Bir Singh | 424 | 0.51 | |
| Margin of victory | | 11 | 0.01 | ▼14.00 |
| Turnout | | 83,621 | 72.59 | ▲2.06 |
| Registered electors | | 1,20,189 | | ▲16.39 |
| BJP gain from INC | | Swing | ▼3.73 | |

=== Assembly Election 1991 ===
1991 Haryana Legislative Assembly election: Gharaunda
| Party | Candidate | Votes | % | ±% |
|---|---|---|---|---|
| INC | Ram Pal Singh S/O Basant Singh | 19,466 | 27.92 | ▼2.11 |
| BJP | Om Parkash | 9,692 | 13.90 | |
| JP | Kuldip Singh | 8,050 | 11.55 | |
| HVP | Ved Pal S/O Bishan Singh | 7,904 | 11.34 | |
| Independent | Deep Chand | 7,582 | 10.87 | |
| Independent | Ved Pal S/O Kiru | 6,867 | 9.85 | |
| Independent | Rajbir Singh | 6,176 | 8.86 | |
| Independent | Dhajja Ram | 827 | 1.19 | |
| Independent | Karan Singh | 695 | 1.00 | |
| Margin of victory | | 9,774 | 14.02 | ▲7.67 |
| Turnout | | 69,724 | 70.49 | ▼0.51 |
| Registered electors | | 1,03,267 | | ▲9.09 |
| INC gain from LKD | | Swing | ▼8.46 | |

=== Assembly Election 1987 ===
1987 Haryana Legislative Assembly election: Gharaunda
| Party | Candidate | Votes | % | ±% |
|---|---|---|---|---|
| LKD | Piru Ram | 23,424 | 36.38 | ▲29.75 |
| INC | Ved Pal | 19,338 | 30.03 | ▲6.14 |
| Independent | Ram Pal Singh | 16,850 | 26.17 | |
| Independent | Baru | 1,128 | 1.75 | |
| Independent | Ram Singh | 907 | 1.41 | |
| Independent | Rajbir Singh | 855 | 1.33 | |
| Independent | Jogi Ram | 508 | 0.79 | |
| Independent | Babu Ram | 339 | 0.53 | |
| Independent | Arjun Singh | 264 | 0.41 | |
| Margin of victory | | 4,086 | 6.35 | ▲4.93 |
| Turnout | | 64,393 | 70.54 | ▲0.57 |
| Registered electors | | 94,663 | | ▲20.63 |
| LKD gain from INC | | Swing | ▲12.49 | |

=== Assembly Election 1982 ===
1982 Haryana Legislative Assembly election: Gharaunda
| Party | Candidate | Votes | % | ±% |
|---|---|---|---|---|
| INC | Ved Pal | 12,646 | 23.89 | ▲9.38 |
| Independent | Om Prakash | 11,898 | 22.48 | |
| JP | Bishan Singh | 8,857 | 16.73 | ▼26.76 |
| CPI(M) | Sube Singh | 6,320 | 11.94 | ▲8.18 |
| Independent | Sohan Lal | 5,960 | 11.26 | |
| LKD | Mohinder Singh | 3,505 | 6.62 | |
| Independent | Rishala Ram | 2,915 | 5.51 | |
| Independent | Madan Mohan | 459 | 0.87 | |
| Independent | Balbir Singh | 372 | 0.70 | |
| Margin of victory | | 748 | 1.41 | ▼25.13 |
| Turnout | | 52,932 | 68.72 | ▲3.56 |
| Registered electors | | 78,474 | | ▲21.50 |
| INC gain from JP | | Swing | ▼19.61 | |

=== Assembly Election 1977 ===
1977 Haryana Legislative Assembly election: Gharaunda
| Party | Candidate | Votes | % | ±% |
|---|---|---|---|---|
| JP | Ram Pal Singh | 17,949 | 43.50 | |
| Independent | Om Parkash S/O Hari Chand | 6,997 | 16.96 | |
| INC | Ram Chander Singh | 5,987 | 14.51 | ▼15.29 |
| Independent | Om Parkash S/O Ghasi Ram | 4,151 | 10.06 | |
| Independent | Ram Chand | 2,207 | 5.35 | |
| Independent | Kuldip Singh | 1,634 | 3.96 | |
| CPI(M) | Suba Singh | 1,551 | 3.76 | ▼17.45 |
| Independent | Jatan Singh | 430 | 1.04 | |
| Independent | Narain Singh | 218 | 0.53 | |
| Margin of victory | | 10,952 | 26.54 | ▲19.48 |
| Turnout | | 41,265 | 64.82 | ▼3.08 |
| Registered electors | | 64,588 | | ▼4.77 |
| JP gain from INC(O) | | Swing | ▲6.63 | |

=== Assembly Election 1972 ===
1972 Haryana Legislative Assembly election: Gharaunda
| Party | Candidate | Votes | % | ±% |
|---|---|---|---|---|
| INC(O) | Rulya Ram | 16,746 | 36.87 | |
| INC | Zila Singh | 13,537 | 29.80 | ▲6.35 |
| CPI(M) | Suba Singh | 9,636 | 21.21 | ▲10.08 |
| Independent | Banarsi | 2,670 | 5.88 | |
| Independent | Babu Ram | 1,425 | 3.14 | |
| Independent | Ram Singh | 843 | 1.86 | |
| Independent | Asa | 567 | 1.25 | |
| Margin of victory | | 3,209 | 7.06 | ▲7.03 |
| Turnout | | 45,424 | 69.56 | ▲10.42 |
| Registered electors | | 67,824 | | ▲17.56 |
| INC(O) gain from ABJS | | Swing | ▲13.07 | |

=== Assembly Election 1968 ===
1968 Haryana Legislative Assembly election: Gharaunda
| Party | Candidate | Votes | % | ±% |
|---|---|---|---|---|
| ABJS | Randhir Singh | 7,766 | 23.80 | ▼7.59 |
| SWA | Rulya Ram | 7,754 | 23.76 | |
| INC | Rajendra Pal | 7,653 | 23.45 | ▼10.82 |
| CPI(M) | Suba Singh | 3,632 | 11.13 | ▲1.57 |
| VHP | Multan Singh | 2,594 | 7.95 | |
| Independent | Asa | 1,226 | 3.76 | |
| Independent | Dalip Singh | 1,082 | 3.32 | |
| Independent | Kanhya | 513 | 1.57 | |
| Independent | Babu Ram | 409 | 1.25 | |
| Margin of victory | | 12 | 0.04 | ▼2.85 |
| Turnout | | 32,629 | 58.31 | ▼15.33 |
| Registered electors | | 57,691 | | ▲2.21 |
| ABJS gain from INC | | Swing | ▼10.47 | |

=== Assembly Election 1967 ===
1967 Haryana Legislative Assembly election: Gharaunda
| Party | Candidate | Votes | % | ±% |
|---|---|---|---|---|
| INC | M. Chand | 13,906 | 34.27 | |
| ABJS | R. Singh | 12,736 | 31.39 | |
| Independent | R. Ram | 10,053 | 24.78 | |
| CPI(M) | S. Singh | 3,879 | 9.56 | |
| Margin of victory | | 1,170 | 2.88 | |
| Turnout | | 40,574 | 77.35 | |
| Registered electors | | 56,442 | | |
| INC win (new seat) | | | | |

== See also ==
- List of constituencies of the Haryana Legislative Assembly
- Karnal district
