= Naggal Assembly constituency =

Constituency of the Haryana legislative assembly in India

Coordinates: 30.322°N 76.869°E

- Former constituency for the Haryana Legislative Assembly

Constituency details
- Country: India
- Region: North India
- State: Haryana
- Established: 1967
- Abolished: 2005
- Total electors: 1,44,635

Naggal Assembly constituency was an assembly constituency in the India state of Haryana.

== Members of the Legislative Assembly ==
Election	Member	Party
1967	Lakhwati	Indian National Congress
1968	Abdul Gaffar Khan	Indian National Congress
1972	Harmohinder Singh Chatha	Indian National Congress
1977	Sumer Chand	Janata Party
1982	Nirmal Singh	Indian National Congress
1987	Harmohinder Singh Chatha	Independent politician
1991	Nirmal Singh	Indian National Congress
1996	Nirmal Singh	Independent politician
2000	Jasbir Mallour	Indian National Lok Dal
2005	Nirmal Singh Mohra	Indian National Congress

== Election results ==
=== Assembly Election 2005 ===
2005 Haryana Legislative Assembly election: Naggal
Party	Candidate	Votes	%	±%
INC	Nirmal Singh (Haryana politician)	52,579	46.90%	▲9.50
INLD	Jasbir Singh Mallour	47,087	42.00%	▼15.40
BJP	Pavittar Singh	5,080	4.53%	New
BSP	Amrik Singh	4,851	4.33%	▲0.22
Independent	Surinder Kumar	663	0.59%	New
Independent	Nirmal Singh Bhurangpur	527	0.47%	New
Margin of victory		5,492	4.90%	▼15.10
Turnout		1,12,115	77.52%	▼0.04
Registered electors		1,44,635		▲19.48
INC gain from INLD		Swing	▼10.50	

=== Assembly Election 2000 ===
2000 Haryana Legislative Assembly election: Naggal
Party	Candidate	Votes	%	±%
INLD	Jasbir Mallour	53,884	57.40%	New
INC	Nirmal Singh S/O Hazara Singh	35,111	37.40%	▲26.90
BSP	Bhupinder Singh	3,854	4.11%	▼9.96
Margin of victory		18,773	20.00%	▼1.70
Turnout		93,879	78.24%	▲1.67
Registered electors		1,21,053		▲1.38
INLD gain from Independent		Swing		

=== Assembly Election 1996 ===
1996 Haryana Legislative Assembly election: Naggal
Party	Candidate	Votes	%	±%
Independent	Nirmal Singh	34,822	38.43%	New
HVP	Jasbir Singh Mallaur	15,162	16.73%	▲13.05
SAP	Jagir Singh	14,611	16.13%	New
BSP	Rajpal	12,741	14.06%	▼0.52
INC	Harmohinder Singh Chatha	9,518	10.50%	▼33.59
AIIC(T)	Kiran Pal	775	0.86%	New
Independent	Karam Vir	719	0.79%	New
Margin of victory		19,660	21.70%	▲6.95
Turnout		90,609	78.33%	▲2.90
Registered electors		1,19,409		▲22.36
Independent gain from INC		Swing	▼5.67	

=== Assembly Election 1991 ===
1991 Haryana Legislative Assembly election: Naggal
Party	Candidate	Votes	%	±%
INC	Nirmal Singh	31,407	44.10%	▲7.84
JP	Gurbax Singh	20,902	29.35%	New
BSP	Bhupinder Singh	10,383	14.58%	New
BJP	Faqir Chand	3,397	4.77%	New
HVP	Mohan Singh	2,627	3.69%	New
Independent	Puran Lal	1,408	1.98%	New
Margin of victory		10,505	14.75%	▼2.10
Turnout		71,224	75.21%	▼6.34
Registered electors		97,590		▲16.12
INC gain from Independent		Swing	▼9.01	

=== Assembly Election 1987 ===
1987 Haryana Legislative Assembly election: Naggal
Party	Candidate	Votes	%	±%
Independent	Harmindra Singh	35,406	53.11%	New
INC	Nirmal Singh	24,171	36.26%	▼16.94
Independent	Jageer Ram	4,385	6.58%	New
Independent	Jasbinder Singh	766	1.15%	New
Margin of victory		11,235	16.85%	▼9.65
Turnout		66,666	80.79%	▲3.28
Registered electors		84,040		▲20.97
Independent gain from INC		Swing	▼0.09	

=== Assembly Election 1982 ===
1982 Haryana Legislative Assembly election: Naggal
Party	Candidate	Votes	%	±%
INC	Nirmal Singh	28,106	53.20%	▲8.41
LKD	Gurpal Singh	14,103	26.70%	New
Independent	Dina Nath Tanwar	7,587	14.36%	New
JP	Sohan Lal	2,129	4.03%	▼48.36
Independent	Daya Singh	764	1.45%	New
Margin of victory		14,003	26.51%	▲18.90
Turnout		52,830	77.48%	▲4.38
Registered electors		69,474		▲15.82
INC gain from JP		Swing	▲0.81	

=== Assembly Election 1977 ===
1977 Haryana Legislative Assembly election: Naggal
Party	Candidate	Votes	%	±%
JP	Sumer Chand	22,522	52.39%	New
INC	Har Mohinder Singh	19,253	44.79%	▼15.16
Independent	Ram Chander	822	1.91%	New
Independent	Mohan Lal	390	0.91%	New
Margin of victory		3,269	7.60%	▼18.60
Turnout		42,987	72.78%	▲1.91
Registered electors		59,983		▲8.47
JP gain from INC		Swing	▼7.56	

=== Assembly Election 1972 ===
1972 Haryana Legislative Assembly election: Naggal
Party	Candidate	Votes	%	±%
INC	Harmohinder Singh Chatha	23,125	59.95%	▲22.12
Independent	Mohinder Singh	13,015	33.74%	New
Independent	Shamsher Singh	1,858	4.82%	New
SSP	Achchari Lal	576	1.49%	New
Margin of victory		10,110	26.21%	▲15.85
Turnout		38,574	72.11%	▲17.14
Registered electors		55,297		▲27.18
INC hold		Swing	▲22.12	

=== Assembly Election 1968 ===
1968 Haryana Legislative Assembly election: Naggal
Party	Candidate	Votes	%	±%
INC	Abdul Gaffar Khan	8,654	37.83%	▼16.50
Independent	Mohinder Singh	6,283	27.46%	New
SWA	Ajmer Singh	3,102	13.56%	▲10.19
VHP	Kartar Singh	2,909	12.71%	New
Independent	Faqir Chand	673	2.94%	New
Independent	Inder Pershad	408	1.78%	New
Independent	Ram Chander	363	1.59%	New
BKD	Tara Chand	241	1.05%	New
ABJS	Puran Singh	200	0.87%	New
Margin of victory		2,371	10.36%	▼5.36
Turnout		22,879	54.42%	▼13.01
Registered electors		43,478		▼11.40
INC hold		Swing	▼16.50	

=== Assembly Election 1967 ===
1967 Haryana Legislative Assembly election: Naggal
Party	Candidate	Votes	%	±%
INC	Lakhwati	17,494	54.32%	New
Independent	M. Singh	12,430	38.60%	New
Independent	H. Singh	1,196	3.71%	New
SWA	I. Raj	1,084	3.37%	New
Margin of victory		5,064	15.72%	
Turnout		32,204	69.31%	
Registered electors		49,071		
INC win (new seat)				
