= Baroda Assembly constituency =

Constituency of the Haryana legislative assembly in India

Coordinates: 29.143°N 76.615°E

Baroda
- Constituency No. 33 for the Haryana Legislative Assembly

Constituency details
- Country: India
- Region: North India
- State: Haryana
- District: Sonipat
- Lok Sabha constituency: Sonipat
- Total electors: 1,90,126
- Reservation: None

Member of Legislative Assembly
- 15th Haryana Legislative Assembly
- Incumbent Indu Raj Narwal
- Party: Indian National Congress
- Elected year: 2024

Baroda Assembly constituency is one of the 90 constituencies in the Haryana Legislative Assembly of Haryana, a state in northwest India. Baroda is also part of Sonipat Lok Sabha constituency.

== Members of the Legislative Assembly ==
Year	Member	Party
1967	Ram Dhari	Indian National Congress
1968	Shyam Chand	Vishal Haryana Party
1972	Shyam Chand	Indian National Congress
1977	Bhalle Ram	Janata Party
1982	Bhalle Ram	Lok Dal
1987	Kirpa Ram	Lok Dal
1991	Ramesh Kumar Khatak	Janata Party
1996	Ramesh Kumar Khatak	Samta Party
2000	Ramesh Kumar Khatak	Indian National Lok Dal
2005	Ramphal	Indian National Lok Dal
2009	Krishan Hooda	Indian National Congress
2014	Krishan Hooda	Indian National Congress
2019	Krishan Hooda	Indian National Congress
2020^	Indu Raj Narwal	Indian National Congress
2024	Indu Raj Narwal	Indian National Congress

^ bypoll

== Election results ==
=== Assembly Election 2024 ===
2024 Haryana Legislative Assembly election: Baroda
Party	Candidate	Votes	%	±%
INC	Indu Raj Narwal	54,462	41.90%	▲7.23
Independent	Kapoor Singh Narwal	48,820	37.56%	New
BJP	Pardeep Singh Sangwan	22,584	17.38%	▼13.35
BSP	Dharam Vir	1,742	1.34%	▼1.33
AAP	Sandeep Malik	1,286	0.99%	New
NOTA	None of the Above	272	0.21%	New
Margin of victory		5,642	4.34%	▲0.40
Turnout		1,29,971	68.80%	▼0.18
Registered electors		1,90,126		▲6.13
INC hold		Swing	▲7.23	

=== Assembly Election 2019 ===
2019 Haryana Legislative Assembly election: Baroda
Party	Candidate	Votes	%	±%
INC	Krishan Hooda	42,566	34.67%	▼7.26
BJP	Yogeshwar Dutt	37,726	30.73%	▲23.51
JJP	Bhupinder Malik	32,480	26.45%	
BSP	Naresh	3,281	2.67%	▼0.03
INLD	Joginder	3,145	2.56%	▼35.06
LSP	Satyanarayn	2,382	1.94%	
Margin of victory		4,840	3.94%	▼0.36
Turnout		1,22,780	68.98%	▼4.94
Registered electors		1,77,991		▲9.17
INC hold		Swing	▼7.26	

=== Assembly Election 2014 ===
2014 Haryana Legislative Assembly election: Baroda
Party	Candidate	Votes	%	±%
INC	Krishan Hooda	50,530	41.93%	▼17.44
INLD	Dr. Kapoor Singh Narwal	45,347	37.63%	▲5.02
BJP	Baljit Singh Malik	8,698	7.22%	▲5.97
Independent	Surender	7,525	6.24%	
BSP	Devender Singh	3,255	2.70%	▲0.09
HJCPV	Jorawar Singh	1,126	0.93%	
Margin of victory		5,183	4.30%	▼22.46
Turnout		1,20,521	73.92%	▲6.72
Registered electors		1,63,033		▲15.69
INC hold		Swing	▼17.44	

=== Assembly Election 2009 ===
2009 Haryana Legislative Assembly election: Baroda
Party	Candidate	Votes	%	±%
INC	Krishan Hooda	56,225	59.37%	▲28.75
INLD	Kapoor Singh Narwal	30,882	32.61%	▼2.27
BSP	Parneet	2,468	2.61%	▲1.4
BJP	Rajesh Kumar Bhardwaj	1,180	1.25%	▼15.37
Upekshit Samaj Party	Vinod Kumar	675	0.71%	
Haryana Janrakshak Dal	Satbir Singh Chahal	661	0.70%	
HJC(BL)	Samunder	571	0.60%	
NCP	Rajbir	538	0.57%	
Margin of victory		25,343	26.76%	▲22.50
Turnout		94,708	67.20%	▼7.16
Registered electors		1,40,925		▲38.32
INC gain from INLD		Swing	▲24.49	

=== Assembly Election 2005 ===
2005 Haryana Legislative Assembly election: Baroda
Party	Candidate	Votes	%	±%
INLD	Ramphal	26,426	34.88%	▼17.26
INC	Rampal	23,199	30.62%	▼4.09
BJP	Mahavir Singh	12,593	16.62%	
Independent	Kapoor Singh Narwal	10,356	13.67%	
BRP	Sanjay	1,521	2.01%	
BSP	Narender Pal	913	1.21%	▼0.16
Independent	Hari Kishan	410	0.54%	
Margin of victory		3,227	4.26%	▼13.16
Turnout		75,766	74.37%	▲5.26
Registered electors		1,01,882		▲2.06
INLD hold		Swing	▼17.26	

=== Assembly Election 2000 ===
2000 Haryana Legislative Assembly election: Baroda
Party	Candidate	Votes	%	±%
INLD	Ramesh Kumar	35,966	52.14%	
INC	Shyam Chand	23,946	34.71%	▲29.21
Independent	Balwan	6,519	9.45%	
HVP	Chander Bhan	941	1.36%	▼37.22
BSP	Balraj	940	1.36%	
Independent	Om Prakash	489	0.71%	
Margin of victory		12,020	17.42%	▲14.50
Turnout		68,985	69.79%	▲2.34
Registered electors		99,829		▼1.83
INLD gain from SAP		Swing	▲10.62	

=== Assembly Election 1996 ===
1996 Haryana Legislative Assembly election: Baroda
Party	Candidate	Votes	%	±%
SAP	Ramesh Kumar	28,181	41.51%	
HVP	Chander Bhan	26,197	38.59%	
Independent	Kamlesh	4,468	6.58%	
INC	Bhalle Ram	3,738	5.51%	▼29.22
Janhit Morcha	Upender	2,111	3.11%	
Independent	Charan Singh	1,530	2.25%	
JP	Kaptan	473	0.70%	▼52.57
Independent	Tara Chand S/O Mai Dayal	454	0.67%	
Independent	Sarita	398	0.59%	
Margin of victory		1,984	2.92%	▼15.62
Turnout		67,888	69.02%	▲6.41
Registered electors		1,01,688		▲5.01
SAP gain from JP		Swing	▼11.76	

=== Assembly Election 1991 ===
1991 Haryana Legislative Assembly election: Baroda
Party	Candidate	Votes	%	±%
JP	Ramesh Kumar	31,133	53.27%	
INC	Ram Dhari	20,297	34.73%	▲14.52
JD	Charan Singh	4,574	7.83%	
BJP	Iqbal Singh	928	1.59%	
Independent	Azad	606	1.04%	
Independent	Ram Kishan	383	0.66%	
Independent	Om Parkash	321	0.55%	
Margin of victory		10,836	18.54%	▼35.45
Turnout		58,448	61.97%	▼14.95
Registered electors		96,841		▲6.34
JP gain from LKD		Swing	▼20.93	

=== Assembly Election 1987 ===
1987 Haryana Legislative Assembly election: Baroda
Party	Candidate	Votes	%	±%
LKD	Kirpa Ram Punia	50,882	74.20%	▲9.26
INC	Shyam Chand	13,857	20.21%	▼11.42
Independent	Ram Parkash	2,151	3.14%	
VHP	Balwant Singh	474	0.69%	
Independent	Sukhbir	415	0.61%	
Independent	Dharma	371	0.54%	
Margin of victory		37,025	53.99%	▲20.68
Turnout		68,575	76.16%	▲4.67
Registered electors		91,066		▲15.51
LKD hold		Swing	▲9.26	

=== Assembly Election 1982 ===
1982 Haryana Legislative Assembly election: Baroda
Party	Candidate	Votes	%	±%
LKD	Bhalle Ram	36,159	64.94%	
INC	Sardara	17,612	31.63%	▲22.64
Independent	Lakhmi	520	0.93%	
Independent	Tara Chand	405	0.73%	
Independent	Tara	370	0.66%	
Independent	Ramji Lal	313	0.56%	
Independent	Jagjiwan	304	0.55%	
Margin of victory		18,547	33.31%	▲23.37
Turnout		55,683	71.77%	▲10.93
Registered electors		78,839		▲15.93
LKD gain from JP		Swing	▲28.72	

=== Assembly Election 1977 ===
1977 Haryana Legislative Assembly election: Baroda
Party	Candidate	Votes	%	±%
JP	Bhalle Ram	14,705	36.22%	
Independent	Darya Singh	10,672	26.29%	
VHP	Ram Dhari	10,386	25.58%	
INC	Shyam Chand	3,651	8.99%	▼48.65
Independent	Harkesh	618	1.52%	
Independent	Lachhman Singh	233	0.57%	
Margin of victory		4,033	9.93%	▼11.51
Turnout		40,598	60.41%	▼7.65
Registered electors		68,005		▲9.64
JP gain from INC		Swing	▼21.43	

=== Assembly Election 1972 ===
1972 Haryana Legislative Assembly election: Baroda
Party	Candidate	Votes	%	±%
INC	Shyam Chand	24,081	57.65%	▲28.46
INC(O)	Ram Dhari	15,123	36.20%	
Independent	Kitab Singh Chauhan	2,053	4.91%	
Independent	Harbans Lal	516	1.24%	
Margin of victory		8,958	21.44%	▲14.80
Turnout		41,773	68.78%	▲18.32
Registered electors		62,027		▲9.70
INC gain from VHP		Swing	▲21.82	

=== Assembly Election 1968 ===
1968 Haryana Legislative Assembly election: Baroda
Party	Candidate	Votes	%	±%
VHP	Shyam Chand	9,934	35.83%	
INC	Ram Dhari	8,092	29.19%	▼7.05
Independent	Chand Ram	4,895	17.66%	
SWA	Barhama Nand	2,242	8.09%	
ABJS	Darya Singh	2,225	8.03%	▼24.01
Independent	Jug Lal	336	1.21%	
Margin of victory		1,842	6.64%	▲2.44
Turnout		27,724	50.28%	▼15.99
Registered electors		56,544		▲1.22
VHP gain from INC		Swing	▼0.41	

=== Assembly Election 1967 ===
1967 Haryana Legislative Assembly election: Baroda
Party	Candidate	Votes	%	±%
INC	R. Dhari	13,164	36.24%	
ABJS	Darya Singh	11,637	32.04%	
Independent	G. Chand	2,168	5.97%	
Independent	R. Singh	1,896	5.22%	
RPI	Harshan	1,700	4.68%	
SSP	S. Bhan	1,637	4.51%	
Independent	S. Chand	1,584	4.36%	
Independent	H. Singh	1,010	2.78%	
Independent	J. Ram	779	2.14%	
Independent	S. Singh	632	1.74%	
Independent	L. Singh	115	0.32%	
Margin of victory		1,527	4.20%	
Turnout		36,322	68.51%	
Registered electors		55,864		
INC win (new seat)				

== See also ==
- Baroda
- Sonipat district
- List of constituencies of Haryana Legislative Assembly
