= 2009 Haryana Legislative Assembly election =

Legislative assembly election in Haryana, India

- 13 October 2009

All 90 seats to the Haryana Legislative Assembly 46 seats needed for a majority
- Turnout: 72.37%
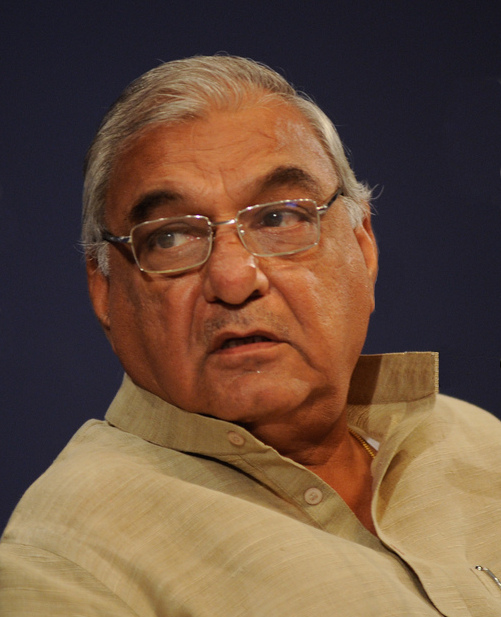

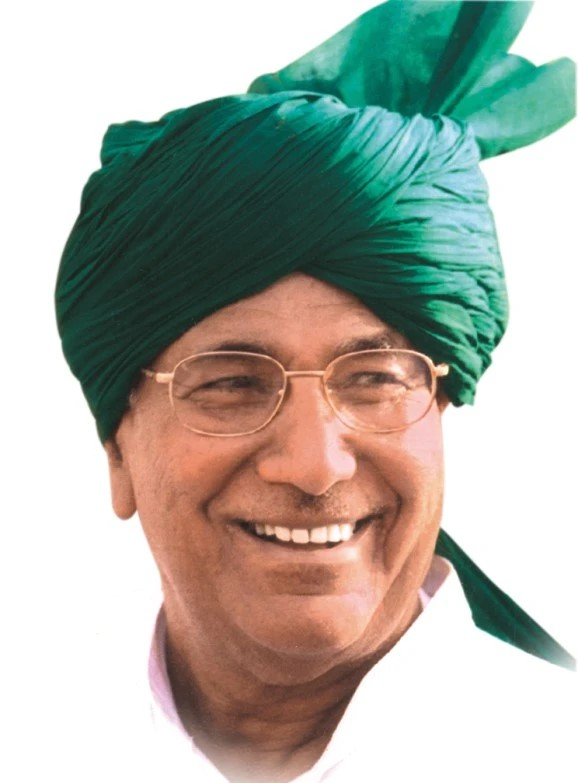

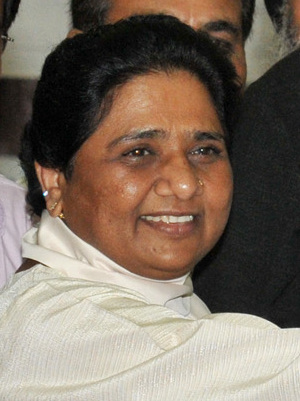
	First party	Second party	Third party
Leader	Bhupinder Singh Hooda	Om Prakash Chautala	Bhajan Lal
Party	INC	INLD	HJC (BL)
Leader since	5 March 2005	24 July 1999	2 December 2007
Leader's seat	Garhi Sampla Kiloi	Uchana Kalan, Ellenabad (Vacated)	Did not Contest
Last election	67 seats, 42.46%	9 seats, 26.77%	New
Seats won	40	31	6
Seat change	▼27	▲22	New
Percentage	35.08%	25.79%	7.40%
Swing	▼7.38%	▼0.98%	New
	Fourth party	Fifth party	Sixth party
	BJP		SAD
Leader	Atme Prakash Manchanda	Mayawati
Party	BJP	BSP	SAD
Alliance	NDA	-	NDA
Seats won	6	1	1
Seat change	▲4	▲1	▲1
Popular vote	857,831	639,096	92,949
Percentage	9.04%	6.73%	0.98
Swing	▼1.32%	n/a	n/a
- Seatwise Result Map of the election
Chief Minister before election
Bhupinder Singh Hooda
INC
Elected Chief Minister
Bhupinder Singh Hooda
INC

The Haryana Legislative Assembly election, 2009 was held on 13 October 2009, to select the 90 members of the Haryana Legislative Assembly. Results were declared on 22 October 2009. Indian National Congress got 40 seats and the party's incumbent Chief Minister Bhupinder Singh Hooda was reelected for a second term.

== Parties and alliances ==
=== United Progressive Alliance ===
No.	Party	Flag	Symbol	Leader	Seats contested
1.	Indian National Congress			Bhupinder Singh Hooda	90

=== National Democratic Alliance ===
No.	Party	Flag	Symbol	Leader	Seats contested
1.	Bharatiya Janata Party			Atme Prakash Manchanda	90

=== Indian National Lok Dal ===
No.	Party	Flag	Symbol	Leader	Seats contested
1.	Indian National Lok Dal			Om Prakash Chautala	88

=== Haryana Janhit Congress (BL) ===
No.	Party	Flag	Symbol	Leader	Seats contested
1.	Haryana Janhit Congress (BL)			Bhajan Lal Bishnoi	87

== Results ==
Summary of results of the Haryana Legislative Assembly election, 2009
Party	Candidates	Seats won	Vote %
Indian National Congress	90	40	35.08
Independents		7	13.16
Haryana Janhit Congress (BL)	87	6	7.40
Indian National Lok Dal	88	31	25.79
Bharatiya Janata Party	90	4	9.04
Bahujan Samaj Party	86	1	6.73
Shiromani Akali Dal	2	1	0.98
Total	1292	90	
Source: ECI

=== Results by district ===
Division	District	Seats						
Division	District	Seats	INC	INLD	HJC	BJP	IND	OTH
Ambala	Ambala	4	2	1	—N/a	1	—N/a	—N/a
Ambala	Kurukshetra	4	2	2	—N/a	—N/a	—N/a	—N/a
Ambala	Panchkula	2	1	1	—N/a	—N/a	—N/a	—N/a
Ambala	Yamunanagar	4	1	2	—N/a	—N/a	—N/a	1
Faridabad	Faridabad	6	4	—N/a	—N/a	1	1	—N/a
Faridabad	Nuh	3	1	2	—N/a	—N/a	—N/a	—N/a
Faridabad	Palwal	3	—N/a	2	—N/a	—N/a	1	—N/a
Gurgaon	Gurgaon	4	2	1	—N/a	—N/a	1	—N/a
Gurgaon	Mahendragarh	4	2	1	1	—N/a	—N/a	—N/a
Gurgaon	Rewari	3	2	1	—N/a	—N/a	—N/a	—N/a
Hisar	Fatehabad	3	1	1	—N/a	—N/a	1	—N/a
Hisar	Hisar	7	4	1	2	—N/a	—N/a	—N/a
Hisar	Jind	5	—N/a	5	—N/a	—N/a	—N/a	—N/a
Hisar	Sirsa	5	—N/a	3	—N/a	—N/a	1	1
Karnal	Kaithal	4	1	2	—N/a	—N/a	1	—N/a
Karnal	Karnal	5	1	3	1	—N/a	—N/a	—N/a
Karnal	Panipat	4	1	1	1	—N/a	1	—N/a
Rohtak	Bhiwani	4	2	1	—N/a	1	—N/a	—N/a
Rohtak	Charkhi Dadri	2	—N/a	1	1	—N/a	—N/a	—N/a
Rohtak	Jhajjar	4	4	—N/a	—N/a	—N/a	—N/a	—N/a
Rohtak	Rohtak	4	4	—N/a	—N/a	—N/a	—N/a	—N/a
Rohtak	Sonipat	6	5	—N/a	—N/a	1	—N/a	—N/a
Total		90	40	31	6	4	7	2

== Results by constituency ==
=== By constituency ===
District	Constituency		Winner				Runner Up				Margin	%
District	#	Name (Note: SC and ST indicate constituencies reserved for Scheduled Castes and Scheduled Tribes respectively.)	Candidate	Party	Votes	%	Candidate	Party	Votes	%	Margin	%
Panchkula	1	Kalka	Pardeep Chaudhary	INLD	41,625	43.99	Satvinder Singh Rana	INC	20,438	21.60	21,187	22.39
Panchkula	2	Panchkula	Devender Bansal	INC	29,192	35.36	Yograj Singh	INLD	16,932	20.51	12,260	14.85
Ambala	3	Naraingarh	Ram Kishan	INC	37,298	32.14	Ram Singh	INLD	28,978	24.97	8,320	7.17
Ambala	4	Ambala Cantt.	Anil Vij	BJP	49,219	49.21	Nirmal Singh	INC	42,881	42.87	6,338	6.34
Ambala	5	Ambala City	Venod Sharma	INC	69,435	52.77	Charanjeet Kaur	SAD	33,885	25.75	35,550	27.02
Ambala	6	Mulana (SC)	Rajbir Singh Barara	INLD	47,185	36.37	Phool Chand Mullana	INC	44,248	34.11	2,937	2.26
Yamunanagar	7	Sadhaura (SC)	Rajpal	INC	47,263	35.58	Balwant Singh	INLD	38,650	29.09	8,613	6.49
Yamunanagar	8	Jagadhri	Akram Khan	BSP	39,868	30.86	Subhash Chand	INC	35,540	27.51	4,328	3.35
Yamunanagar	9	Yamunanagar	Dilbagh Singh	INLD	46,984	41.62	Devinder Chawla	INC	33,411	29.59	13,573	12.03
Yamunanagar	10	Radaur	Dr. Bishan Lal Saini	INLD	29,593	25.71	Suresh Kumar	INC	25,198	21.89	4,395	3.82
Kurukshetra	11	Ladwa	Sher Singh Barshami	INLD	32,505	28.93	Kailasho Saini	INC	30,000	26.70	2,505	2.23
Kurukshetra	12	Shahbad (SC)	Anil Dhantori	INC	30,843	33.24	Jitender Kumar	INLD	27,102	29.21	3,741	4.03
Kurukshetra	13	Thanesar	Ashok Kumar Arora	INLD	29,516	32.87	Ramesh Gupta	INC	21,231	23.64	8,285	9.23
Kurukshetra	14	Pehowa	Harmohinder Singh	INC	35,429	33.24	Jaswinder Singh	INLD	31,349	29.41	4,080	3.83
Kaithal	15	Guhla (SC)	Phool Singh	INLD	37,016	33.43	Dillu Ram	INC	31,763	28.69	5,253	4.74
Kaithal	16	Kalayat	Rampal Majra	INLD	55,614	43.18	Tejender Pal Singh	INC	46,214	35.88	9,400	7.30
Kaithal	17	Kaithal	Randeep Surjewala	INC	59,889	51.30	Kailash Bhagat	INLD	37,387	32.03	22,502	19.27
Kaithal	18	Pundri	Sultan	IND	38,929	31.71	Dinesh Kaushik	INC	34,878	28.41	4,051	3.30
Karnal	19	Nilokheri (SC)	Mamu Ram	INLD	47,001	44.51	Meena Rani	INC	30,278	28.67	16,723	15.84
Karnal	20	Indri	Ashok Kashyap	INLD	36,886	33.05	Bhim Sain Mehta	INC	27,789	24.90	9,097	8.15
Karnal	21	Karnal	Sumita Singh	INC	35,894	35.45	Jai Parkash	HJC	32,163	31.76	3,731	3.69
Karnal	22	Gharaunda	Narender Sangwan	INLD	35,256	29.44	Varinder Singh Rathore	INC	33,596	28.05	1,660	1.39
Karnal	23	Assandh	Pt. Zile Ram Chochra	HJC	20,266	15.80	Raghbir Singh Virk	IND	16,726	13.04	3,540	2.76
Panipat	24	Panipat Rural	Om Prakash Jain	IND	23,770	24.75	Bimla Kadian	INLD	17,134	17.84	6,636	6.91
Panipat	25	Panipat City	Balbir Pal Shah	INC	36,294	38.42	Sanjay Bhatia	BJP	24,135	25.55	12,159	12.87
Panipat	26	Israna (SC)	Krishan Lal Panwar	INLD	43,905	46.27	Balbir	INC	41,725	43.97	2,180	2.30
Panipat	27	Samalkha	Dharm Singh	HJC	39,463	35.19	Sanjay Chhoker	INC	26,012	23.20	13,451	11.99
Sonipat	28	Ganaur	Kuldeep Sharma	INC	42,180	46.01	Krishan Gopal Tyagi	INLD	32,144	35.06	10,036	10.95
Sonipat	29	Rai	Jai Tirath	INC	35,514	41.12	Inderjit	INLD	30,848	35.72	4,666	5.40
Sonipat	30	Kharkhauda (SC)	Jaiveer	INC	43,684	64.07	Raju	INLD	18,400	26.99	25,284	37.08
Sonipat	31	Sonipat	Kavita Jain	BJP	37,954	46.44	Anil Kumar Thakkar	INC	35,297	43.19	2,657	3.25
Sonipat	32	Gohana	Jagbir Singh Malik	INC	35,249	42.48	Atul Malik	INLD	22,233	26.80	13,016	15.68
Sonipat	33	Baroda	Sri Krishan	INC	56,225	59.37	Kapoor Narwal	INLD	30,882	32.61	25,343	26.76
Jind	34	Julana	Parminder Singh Dhull	INLD	45,576	43.73	Sher Singh	INC	32,765	31.44	12,811	12.29
Jind	35	Safidon	Kali Ram Patwari	INLD	38,618	35.48	Bachan Singh Arya	IND	23,182	21.30	15,436	14.18
Jind	36	Jind	Hari Middha	INLD	34,057	36.40	Mange Ram Gupta	INC	26,195	28.00	7,862	8.40
Jind	37	Uchana Kalan	Om Parkash Chautala	INLD	62,669	46.81	Birender Singh	INC	62,048	46.34	621	0.47
Jind	38	Narwana (SC)	Pirthi Singh	INLD	63,703	52.32	Ramphal	INC	43,063	35.37	20,640	16.95
Fatehabad	39	Tohana	Paramvir Singh	INC	46,752	34.01	Nishan Singh	INLD	42,900	31.21	3,852	2.80
Fatehabad	40	Fatehabad	Prahlad Gillan Khera	IND	48,637	32.88	Dura Ram	INC	45,835	30.99	2,802	1.89
Fatehabad	41	Ratia (SC)	Gian Chand	INLD	50,095	39.72	Jarnail Singh	INC	46,713	37.04	3,382	2.68
Sirsa	42	Kalanwali (SC)	Charanjeet Singh	SAD	59,064	50.98	Sushil Indora	INC	46,520	40.16	12,544	10.82
Sirsa	43	Dabwali	Ajay Singh Chautala	INLD	64,868	47.55	Dr. K. V. Singh	INC	52,760	38.68	12,108	8.87
Sirsa	44	Rania	Krishan Lal	INLD	48,241	39.74	Ranjit Singh	INC	44,590	36.74	3,651	3.00
Sirsa	45	Sirsa	Gopal Kanda	IND	38,147	32.94	Padam Chand	INLD	31,678	27.35	6,469	5.59
Sirsa	46	Ellenabad	Om Parkash Chautala	INLD	64,567	51.94	Bharat Singh Beniwal	INC	48,144	38.73	16,423	13.21
Hisar	47	Adampur	Kuldeep Bishnoi	HJC	48,224	45.77	Jai Prakash	INC	42,209	40.06	6,015	5.71
Hisar	48	Uklana (SC)	Naresh Selwal	INC	45,973	41.17	Seema Devi	INLD	42,235	37.83	3,738	3.34
Hisar	49	Narnaund	Saroj	INLD	48,322	37.41	Ram Kumar	INC	38,225	29.59	10,097	7.82
Hisar	50	Hansi	Vinod Bhayana	HJC	36,529	34.36	Prof. Chattar Pal Singh	INC	30,246	28.45	6,283	5.91
Hisar	51	Barwala	Ram Niwas Ghorela	INC	29,998	31.80	Sheela Bhayan	INLD	20,602	21.84	9,396	9.96
Hisar	52	Hisar	Savitri Jindal	INC	32,866	42.12	Gautam Sardana	IND	18,138	23.24	14,728	18.88
Hisar	53	Nalwa	Sampat Singh	INC	38,138	40.45	Jasma Devi	HJC	27,237	28.88	10,901	11.57
Bhiwani	54	Loharu	Dharam Pal	INLD	30,887	27.14	Jai Parkash Dalal	IND	30,264	26.59	623	0.55
Bhiwani	55	Badhra	Raghbir Singh	INLD	34,280	32.65	Ranbir Singh Mahendra	INC	33,571	31.97	709	0.68
Bhiwani	56	Dadri	Satpal	HJC	27,790	28.22	Rajdeep	INLD	27,645	28.08	145	0.14
Bhiwani	57	Bhiwani	Ghansyam Saraf	BJP	27,337	28.44	Shiv Bhardwaj	INC	24,692	25.69	2,645	2.75
Bhiwani	58	Tosham	Kiran Choudhary	INC	62,290	57.65	Col. Gajraj Singh	INLD	16,183	14.98	46,107	42.67
Bhiwani	59	Bawani Khera (SC)	Ram Kishan Fouji	INC	35,039	33.56	Azad Singh	INLD	28,766	27.55	6,273	6.01
Rohtak	60	Meham	Anand Singh	INC	43,964	37.59	Shamsher	IND	36,998	31.63	6,966	5.96
Rohtak	61	Garhi Sampla-Kiloi	Bhupinder Singh	INC	89,849	79.81	Satish Kumar	INLD	17,749	15.77	72,100	64.04
Rohtak	62	Rohtak	Bharat Batra	INC	47,051	56.64	Manish Grover	BJP	27,456	33.05	19,595	23.59
Rohtak	63	Kalanaur (SC)	Shakuntla	INC	52,142	56.73	Naga Ram	INLD	24,282	26.42	27,860	30.31
Jhajjar	64	Bahadurgarh	Rajinder Singh Joon	INC	38,641	43.29	Nafe Singh Rathi	INLD	19,289	21.61	19,352	21.68
Jhajjar	65	Badli	Naresh Kumar	INC	33,186	36.74	Brijender Singh Chahar	IND	19,828	21.95	13,358	14.79
Jhajjar	66	Jhajjar (SC)	Geeta	INC	48,806	60.25	Kanta Devi	INLD	21,023	25.95	27,783	34.30
Jhajjar	67	Beri	Dr. Raghubir Singh	INC	37,742	39.48	Chatar Singh	IND	32,566	34.07	5,176	5.41
Mahendragarh	68	Ateli	Anita Yadav	INC	24,103	22.44	Santosh Yadav	BJP	23,130	21.53	973	0.91
Mahendragarh	69	Mahendragarh	Dan Singh	INC	42,286	37.77	Ram Bilash Sharma	BJP	36,833	32.90	5,453	4.87
Mahendragarh	70	Narnaul	Narender Singh	HJC	25,011	31.72	Bhana Ram	INLD	21,619	27.42	3,392	4.30
Mahendragarh	71	Nangal Chaudhry	Bahadur Singh	INLD	32,984	38.01	Radhey Shyam	INC	21,321	24.57	11,663	13.44
Rewari	72	Bawal (SC)	Rameshwar Dayal	INLD	58,473	53.26	Shakuntla Bhagwaria	INC	36,472	33.22	22,001	20.04
Rewari	73	Kosli	Yaduvender Singh	INC	47,896	37.47	Jagdish Yadav	IND	44,473	34.79	3,423	2.68
Rewari	74	Rewari	Ajay Singh	INC	48,557	40.35	Satish	IND	35,269	29.31	13,288	11.04
Gurgaon	75	Pataudi (SC)	Ganga Ram	INLD	49,323	51.45	Bhupinder	INC	24,576	25.64	24,747	25.81
Gurgaon	76	Badshahpur	Dharam Pal	INC	50,557	34.59	Rakesh	IND	39,172	26.80	11,385	7.79
Gurgaon	77	Gurgaon	Sukhbeer	IND	41,013	32.74	Dharambir	INC	38,873	31.03	2,140	1.71
Gurgaon	78	Sohna	Dharambir	INC	20,443	17.93	Zakir Hussain	BSP	19,938	17.49	505	0.44
Gurgaon	79	Nuh	Aftab Ahmed	INC	33,925	39.09	Sanjay	BJP	17,021	19.61	16,904	19.48
Gurgaon	80	Ferozepur Jhirka	Naseem Ahmed	INLD	42,824	46.15	Er. Mamman Khan	INC	24,630	26.54	18,194	19.61
Gurgaon	81	Punahana	Mohammed Ilyas	INLD	18,865	23.23	Dayawati	BSP	16,177	19.92	2,688	3.31
Faridabad	82	Hathin	Jaleb Khan	IND	33,774	29.59	Harsh Kumar	INC	27,301	23.92	6,473	5.67
Faridabad	83	Hodal (SC)	Jagdish Nayar	INLD	46,515	49.53	Uday Bhan	INC	43,894	46.74	2,621	2.79
Faridabad	84	Palwal	Subhash Choudhary	INLD	51,712	46.42	Karan Singh Dalal	INC	45,040	40.43	6,672	5.99
Faridabad	85	Prithla	Raghubir Singh	INC	34,647	34.67	Tek Chand Sharma	BSP	31,492	31.51	3,155	3.16
Faridabad	86	Faridabad NIT	Shiv Charan Lal	IND	23,461	27.98	Akagar Chaudhry	INC	15,586	18.59	7,875	9.39
Faridabad	87	Badkhal	Mahender Partap Singh	INC	33,150	44.25	Seema Trikha	BJP	20,471	27.33	12,679	16.92
Faridabad	88	Ballabhgarh	Sharda Rathore	INC	35,535	46.13	Surender Tewatia	BJP	11,691	15.18	23,844	30.95
Faridabad	89	Faridabad	Anand Kaushik	INC	33,744	45.16	Parvesh Mehta	BJP	22,903	30.65	10,841	14.51
Faridabad	90	Tigaon	Krishan Pal	BJP	39,746	45.62	Lalit Nagar	INC	38,928	44.68	818	0.94

== See also ==
- Elections in Haryana
- 2009 elections in India
