= Subhash Gangoli =

Indian politician

Member of the Haryana Legislative Assembly
- In office 2019–2024
- Preceded by: Jasbir Deswal
- Succeeded by: Ram Kumar Gautam
- Constituency: Safidon

Personal details
- Born: 1968 (age 57–58) Jind, Haryana
- Party: Indian National Congress

Subhash Gangoli (born 1968) is an Indian politician who had served as a Member of the Haryana Legislative Assembly. He was elected from the Safidon Assembly constituency representing the Indian National Congress, in 2019 in the first election of his life. He lost in 2024.

== Early life and education ==
Subhash Gangoli was born in 1968 Gangoli Village Safidon Constituency in Jind District, Her Father is Raldu Ram Deswal. Subash Gangoli born in (Deswal) Jat Family.

Gangoli did M. A In Hindi from Kurukshetra University in 1989.
