= Indu Raj Narwal =

Indian politician

Indu Raj Narwal is an Indian politician who is serving as Member of 14th Haryana Assembly from Baroda Assembly constituency. He is a member of the Indian National Congress.

== Personal life ==
He was born on 29 April 1977 at Rindhana village in Sonipat district.
