= Balwant Singh (Haryana politician) =

Indian politician

Member of Haryana Legislative Assembly
- In office 2014–2019
- Preceded by: Rajpal
- Succeeded by: Renu Bala
- Constituency: Sadhaura

Personal details
- Political party: Bharatiya Janata Party
- Profession: Politician

Balwant Singh is an Indian politician who served as a Member of the Haryana Legislative Assembly from the Sadhaura Assembly constituency representing the Bharatiya Janata Party from 2014 to 2019.
