= 2009 Indian general election in Haryana =

- 7 May 2009

10 seats
- Turnout: 67.51%
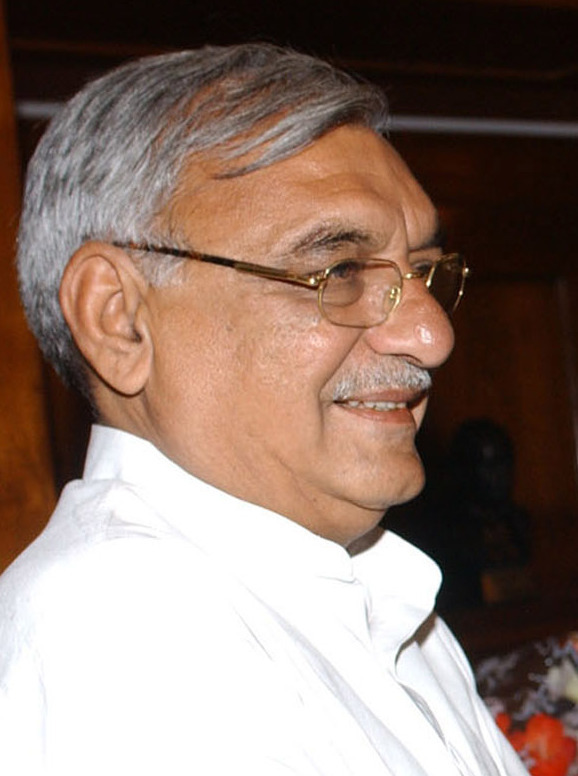

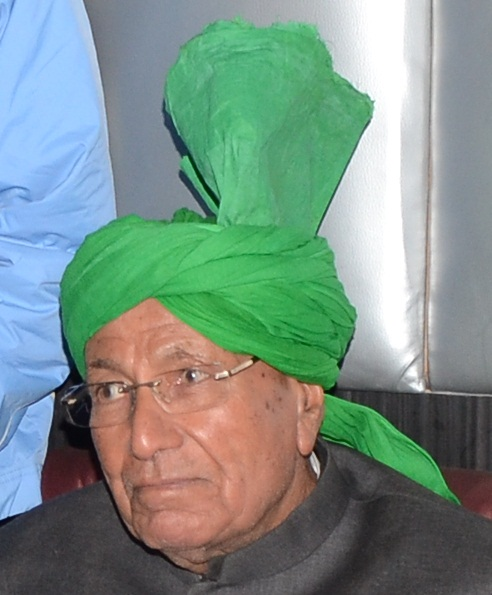
	First party	Second party	Third party
Leader	Bhupinder Singh Hooda	Bhajan Lal Bishnoi	Om Prakash Chautala
Party	INC	HJC	INLD
Alliance	UPA	Third Front	NDA
Leader's seat	Did not contest	Hisar	Did not contest
Last election	9	New	1
Seats won	9	1	0
Seat change	Steady	New	0
Percentage	41.77%	10.01%	15.77%
Swing	▼0.36%	New	▼6.66%
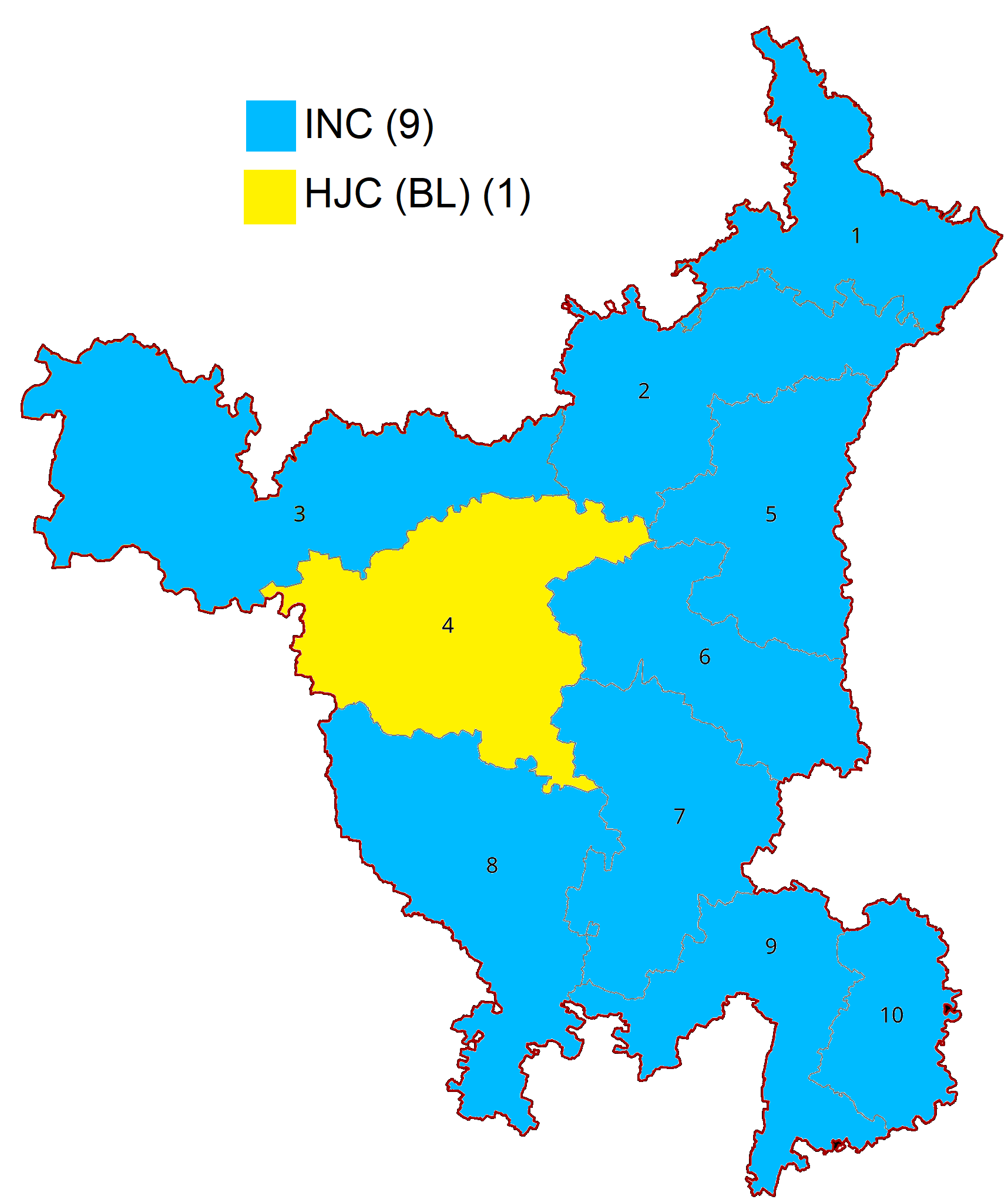
- Indian general election in Haryana, 2009
Prime Minister before election
Manmohan Singh
INC
Prime Minister after election
Manmohan Singh
INC

The 2009 Indian general election were held for 10 seats in Haryana. Eight of these seats were unreserved while two (Ambala and Sirsa) were reserved for candidates from Scheduled Castes.

== Nominations ==
A total of 285 candidates (254 men and 31 women) filed nominations with the Election Commission of India (ECI) to contest elections. Among these, 45 nominations (32 men and 13 women) were rejected by the ECI. In addition, 30 candidates (26 men and 4 women) withdrew their nominations. This resulted in 210 candidates (196 men and 14 women) contesting elections.

== Parties and alliances ==
Seat Sharing Agreement between BJP and INLD in 2009 Lok Sabha in Haryana

Party/Alliance Name		Flag	Electoral symbol	Leader	Seats contested
NDA	Bharatiya Janata Party			Atme Prakash Manchanda	5
NDA	Indian National Lok Dal			Om Prakash Chautala	5
Indian National Congress				Bhupinder Singh Hooda	10
Haryana Janhit Congress (BL)				Bhajan Lal	10

== List of candidates ==
Constituency		INC		HJC(BL)		NDA	
#	Name	Party	Candidate	Party	Candidate	Party	Candidate
1	Ambala	INC	Selja Kumari	HJC(BL)	Dalvir Singh	BJP	Rattan Lal Kataria
2	Kurukshetra	INC	Naveen Jindal	HJC(BL)	Jaswant Singh Cheema	INLD	Ashok Kumar Arora
3	Sirsa	INC	Ashok Tanwar	HJC(BL)	Rajendra Prasad	INLD	Dr. Sita Ram
4	Hisar	INC	Jai Parkash	HJC(BL)	Bhajan Lal	INLD	Sampat Singh
5	Karnal	INC	Arvind Kumar Sharma	HJC(BL)	Dr. Ramesh Chhabra	BJP	I. D. Swami
6	Sonipat	INC	Jitender Singh Malik	HJC(BL)	Pt. Umesh Sharma	BJP	Kishan Singh Sangwan
7	Rohtak	INC	Deepender Singh Hooda	HJC(BL)	Krishan Murti	INLD	Nafe Singh Rathee
8	Bhiwani–Mahendragarh	INC	Shruti Choudhry	HJC(BL)	Narender Singh	INLD	Ajay Singh Chautala
9	Gurgaon	INC	Rao Inderjit Singh	HJC(BL)	Rao Narbir Singh	BJP	Sudha Yadav
10	Faridabad	INC	Avtar Singh Bhadana	HJC(BL)	Chander Bhatia	BJP	Ram Chander Bainda

== Results ==
The Indian National Congress won 9 seats while Haryana Janhit Congress (BL) won one seat. Out of total 210 candidates contesting, deposits of 185 candidates (173 men and 12 women) were forfeited for failing to secure more than one-sixth (16.7%) of the total valid votes cast.

Alliance/ Party		Popular vote			Seats		
Alliance/ Party		Votes	%	±pp	Contested	Won	+/−
INC		34,07,291	41.77	▼0.36	10	9	Steady
HJC(BL)		8,16,395	10.01	New	10	1	▲1
NDA	INLD	12,86,573	15.77	▼6.66	5	0	Steady
NDA	BJP	9,86,136	12.09	▼5.12	5	0	▼1
NDA	Total	22,72,709	27.86	Steady	10	0	Steady
BSP		12,84,067	15.74	▲10.76	10	0	Steady
Others		1,62,007	1.99	Steady	57	0	Steady
IND		2,14,084	2.62	▼0.46	113	0	Steady
Total		81,56,553	100%	-	210	10	-

== Constituency wise results ==
Constituency		Winner				Runner Up				Margin	%
#	Name	Candidate	Party	Votes	%	Candidate	Party	Votes	%	Margin	%
1	Ambala (SC)	Selja Kumari	INC	322,258	37.19	Rattan Lal Kataria	BJP	307,688	35.50	14,570	1.69
2	Kurukshetra	Naveen Jindal	INC	397,204	45.37	Ashok Kumar Arora	INLD	278,475	31.81	118,729	13.56
3	Sirsa (SC)	Ashok Tanwar	INC	415,584	42.35	Dr. Sita Ram	INLD	380,085	38.74	35,499	3.61
4	Hisar	Bhajan Lal Bishnoi	HJC	248,476	29.99	Sampat Singh	INLD	241,493	29.15	6,983	0.84
5	Karnal	Arvind Kumar Sharma	INC	304,698	37.57	Maratha Virender Verma	BSP	228,352	28.16	76,346	9.41
6	Sonipat	Jitender Singh Malik	INC	338,795	47.57	Kishan Singh Sangwan	BJP	177,511	24.92	161,284	22.65
7	Rohtak	Deepender Singh Hooda	INC	585,016	69.98	Nafe Singh Rathee	INLD	139,280	16.66	445,736	53.32
8	Bhiwani-Mahendragarh	Shruti Choudhry	INC	302,817	35.03	Ajay Singh Chautala	INLD	247,240	28.60	55,577	6.43
9	Gurgaon	Rao Inderjit Singh	INC	278,516	36.83	Zakir Hussain	BSP	193,652	25.61	84,864	11.22
10	Faridabad	Avtar Singh Bhadana	INC	257,864	41.26	Ram Chander Bainda	BJP	189,663	30.35	68,201	10.91

== Post-election Union Council of Ministers from Haryana ==
#	Name	Constituency	Designation	Department	From	To	Party
1	Selja Kumari	Ambala	Cabinet Minister	Tourism	28 May 2009	19 January 2011	INC
1	Selja Kumari	Ambala	Cabinet Minister	Housing and Urban Poverty Alleviation	28 May 2009	28 October 2012	INC
1	Selja Kumari	Ambala	Cabinet Minister	Culture	19 January 2011	28 October 2012	INC
1	Selja Kumari	Ambala	Cabinet Minister	Social Justice and Empowerment	28 October 2012	28 January 2014	INC

== Assembly segments wise lead of Parties ==
Party	Assembly segments	Position in Assembly (as of 2009 elections)
Indian National Congress	59	40
Haryana Janhit Congress (BL)	9	6
Bahujan Samaj Party	8	1
Indian National Lok Dal	7	31
Bharatiya Janata Party	7	4
Others	0	8
Total	90	

=== Constituency Wise ===
Constituency		Winner			Runner-up			Margin
#	Name	Candidate	Party	Votes	Candidate	Party	Votes	Margin
Ambala Lok Sabha constituency
1	Kalka	Rattan Lal Kataria	BJP	33,361	Selja Kumari	INC	26,057	7,304
2	Panchkula	Selja Kumari	INC	33,688	Rattan Lal Kataria	BJP	29,789	3,899
3	Naraingarh	Rattan Lal Kataria	BJP	37,993	Selja Kumari	INC	33,891	4,102
4	Ambala Cantt.	Selja Kumari	INC	41,730	Rattan Lal Kataria	BJP	28,161	13,569
5	Ambala City	Selja Kumari	INC	50,943	Rattan Lal Kataria	BJP	41,465	9,478
6	Mulana (SC)	Rattan Lal Kataria	BJP	38,154	Chander Pal	BSP	38,071	83
7	Sadhaura (SC)	Chander Pal	BSP	40,425	Rattan Lal Kataria	BJP	36,215	4,210
8	Jagadhri	Selja Kumari	INC	36,878	Chander Pal	BSP	32,630	4,248
9	Yamunanagar	Rattan Lal Kataria	BJP	32,383	Selja Kumari	INC	32,067	316
Kurukshetra Lok Sabha constituency
10	Radaur	Naveen Jindal	INC	40,006	Gurdyal Singh Saini	BSP	29,733	10,273
11	Ladwa	Naveen Jindal	INC	41,845	Ashok Kumar Arora	INLD	32,755	9,090
12	Shahbad (SC)	Naveen Jindal	INC	39,923	Ashok Kumar Arora	INLD	30,891	9,032
13	Thanesar	Naveen Jindal	INC	36,164	Ashok Kumar Arora	INLD	28,480	7,684
14	Pehowa	Naveen Jindal	INC	46,950	Ashok Kumar Arora	INLD	32,091	14,859
15	Guhla (SC)	Naveen Jindal	INC	51,564	Ashok Kumar Arora	INLD	31,851	19,713
16	Kalayat	Naveen Jindal	INC	50,233	Ashok Kumar Arora	INLD	37,293	12,940
17	Kaithal	Naveen Jindal	INC	51,830	Ashok Kumar Arora	INLD	25,154	26,676
18	Pundri	Naveen Jindal	INC	38,625	Ashok Kumar Arora	INLD	32,573	6,052
Sirsa Lok Sabha constituency
38	Narwana (SC)	Dr. Sita Ram	INLD	51,718	Ashok Tanwar	INC	36,664	15,054
39	Tohana	Ashok Tanwar	INC	49,144	Dr. Sita Ram	INLD	40,565	8,579
40	Fatehabad	Ashok Tanwar	INC	47,982	Dr. Sita Ram	INLD	37,183	10,799
41	Ratia (SC)	Ashok Tanwar	INC	49,063	Dr. Sita Ram	INLD	37,950	11,113
42	Kalawali (SC)	Dr. Sita Ram	INLD	41,133	Ashok Tanwar	INC	40,815	318
43	Dabwali	Ashok Tanwar	INC	51,635	Dr. Sita Ram	INLD	48,102	3,533
44	Rania	Ashok Tanwar	INC	47,918	Dr. Sita Ram	INLD	42,621	5,297
45	Sirsa	Ashok Tanwar	INC	46,390	Dr. Sita Ram	INLD	33,460	12,930
46	Ellenabad	Dr. Sita Ram	INLD	47,139	Ashok Tanwar	INC	45,860	1,279
Hisar Lok Sabha constituency
37	Uchana Kalan	Sampat Singh	INLD	47,181	Jai Parkash	INC	22,655	24,526
47	Adampur	Bhajan Lal	HJC(BL)	38,914	Jai Parkash	INC	24,577	14,337
48	Uklana (SC)	Sampat Singh	INLD	40,346	Jai Parkash	INC	26,620	13,726
49	Narnaund	Sampat Singh	INLD	38,954	Jai Parkash	INC	29,476	9,478
50	Hansi	Bhajan Lal	HJC(BL)	32,581	Jai Parkash	INC	23,811	8,770
51	Barwala	Bhajan Lal	HJC(BL)	29,274	Sampat Singh	INLD	22,210	7,064
52	Hisar	Bhajan Lal	HJC(BL)	31,850	Jai Parkash	INC	14,324	17,526
53	Nalwa	Bhajan Lal	HJC(BL)	30,528	Jai Parkash	INC	22,008	8,520
59	Bawani Khera (SC)	Bhajan Lal	HJC(BL)	31,232	Sampat Singh	INLD	23,629	7,603
Karnal Lok Sabha constituency
19	Nilokheri (SC)	Maratha Virender Verma	BSP	42,223	Arvind Kumar Sharma	INC	29,436	12,787
20	Indri	Maratha Virender Verma	BSP	34,865	Arvind Kumar Sharma	INC	27,675	7,190
21	Karnal	Arvind Kumar Sharma	INC	38,532	I. D. Swami	BJP	23,753	14,779
22	Gharaunda	Maratha Virender Verma	BSP	38,372	Arvind Kumar Sharma	INC	28,171	10,201
23	Assandh	Arvind Kumar Sharma	INC	37,373	Maratha Virender Verma	BSP	36,487	886
24	Panipat Rural	Arvind Kumar Sharma	INC	31,078	I. D. Swami	BJP	18,004	13,074
25	Panipat City	Arvind Kumar Sharma	INC	31,998	I. D. Swami	BJP	20,352	11,646
26	Israna (SC)	Arvind Kumar Sharma	INC	36,113	Maratha Virender Verma	BSP	26,542	9,571
27	Samalkha	Arvind Kumar Sharma	INC	44,302	I. D. Swami	BJP	16,039	28,263
Sonipat Lok Sabha constituency
28	Ganaur	Jitender Singh	INC	40,972	Kishan Singh Sangwan	BJP	24,294	16,678
29	Rai	Jitender Singh	INC	35,955	Kishan Singh Sangwan	BJP	21,484	14,471
30	Kharkhauda (SC)	Jitender Singh	INC	43,946	Kishan Singh Sangwan	BJP	11,827	32,119
31	Sonipat	Jitender Singh	INC	35,733	Kishan Singh Sangwan	BJP	19,765	15,968
32	Gohana	Jitender Singh	INC	43,179	Kishan Singh Sangwan	BJP	15,381	27,798
33	Baroda	Jitender Singh	INC	54,037	Kishan Singh Sangwan	BJP	13,574	40,463
34	Julana	Jitender Singh	INC	32,342	Kishan Singh Sangwan	BJP	22,193	10,149
35	Safidon	Jitender Singh	INC	31,871	Kishan Singh Sangwan	BJP	24,843	7,028
36	Jind	Kishan Singh Sangwan	BJP	24,018	Jitender Singh	INC	20,716	3,302
Rohtak Lok Sabha constituency
60	Meham	Deepender Singh	INC	68,961	Nafe Singh Rathee	INLD	13,492	55,469
61	Garhi Sampla-Kiloi	Deepender Singh	INC	87,908	Nafe Singh Rathee	INLD	10,099	77,809
62	Rohtak	Deepender Singh	INC	64,621	Nafe Singh Rathee	INLD	8,759	55,862
63	Kalanaur (SC)	Deepender Singh	INC	64,707	Raj Kumar	BSP	13,580	51,127
64	Bahadurgarh	Deepender Singh	INC	56,985	Nafe Singh Rathee	INLD	16,033	40,952
65	Badli	Deepender Singh	INC	61,017	Nafe Singh Rathee	INLD	14,400	46,617
66	Jhajjar (SC)	Deepender Singh	INC	58,262	Nafe Singh Rathee	INLD	14,300	43,962
67	Beri	Deepender Singh	INC	61,912	Nafe Singh Rathee	INLD	14,105	47,807
73	Kosli	Deepender Singh	INC	60,393	Nafe Singh Rathee	INLD	36,243	24,150
Bhiwani–Mahendragarh Lok Sabha constituency
54	Loharu	Shruti Choudhry	INC	50,561	Ajay Singh Chautala	INLD	32,125	18,436
55	Badhra	Shruti Choudhry	INC	50,590	Ajay Singh Chautala	INLD	36,090	14,500
56	Dadri	Shruti Choudhry	INC	38,234	Ajay Singh Chautala	INLD	24,514	13,720
57	Bhiwani	Shruti Choudhry	INC	36,228	Ajay Singh Chautala	INLD	19,346	16,882
58	Tosham	Shruti Choudhry	INC	53,342	Ajay Singh Chautala	INLD	27,937	25,405
68	Ateli	Narender Singh	HJC(BL)	39,340	Ajay Singh Chautala	INLD	28,792	10,548
69	Mahendragarh	Narender Singh	HJC(BL)	44,126	Ajay Singh Chautala	INLD	28,459	15,667
70	Narnaul	Narender Singh	HJC(BL)	29,012	Ajay Singh Chautala	INLD	22,352	6,660
71	Nangal Chaudhry	Ajay Singh Chautala	INLD	27,289	Shruti Choudhry	INC	21,808	5,481
Gurgaon Lok Sabha constituency
72	Bawal (SC)	Inderjit Singh	INC	42,653	Narvir Singh	HJC(BL)	20,437	22,216
74	Rewari	Inderjit Singh	INC	42,443	Narvir Singh	HJC(BL)	22,773	19,670
75	Pataudi (SC)	Inderjit Singh	INC	38,535	Sudha	BJP	19,568	18,967
76	Badshahpur	Inderjit Singh	INC	39,454	Sudha	BJP	25,818	13,636
77	Gurgaon	Inderjit Singh	INC	38,654	Sudha	BJP	24,420	14,234
78	Sohna	Zakir Hussain	BSP	28,925	Inderjit Singh	INC	27,550	1,375
79	Nuh	Zakir Hussain	BSP	36,079	Inderjit Singh	INC	17,122	18,957
80	Ferozepur Jhirka	Zakir Hussain	BSP	39,431	Inderjit Singh	INC	17,269	22,162
81	Punahana	Zakir Hussain	BSP	33,327	Inderjit Singh	INC	14,690	18,637
Faridabad Lok Sabha constituency
82	Hathin	Avtar Singh Bhadana	INC	33,694	Chetan Sharma	BSP	21,220	12,474
83	Hodal (SC)	Ramchander Bainda	BJP	25,965	Avtar Singh Bhadana	INC	25,316	649
84	Palwal	Avtar Singh Bhadana	INC	28,650	Ramchander Bainda	BJP	25,229	3,421
85	Prithla	Ramchander Bainda	BJP	25,510	Avtar Singh Bhadana	INC	24,125	1,385
86	Faridabad NIT	Avtar Singh Bhadana	INC	28,305	Ramchander Bainda	BJP	16,333	11,972
87	Badkhal	Avtar Singh Bhadana	INC	30,022	Ramchander Bainda	BJP	13,775	16,247
88	Ballabhgarh	Avtar Singh Bhadana	INC	25,459	Ramchander Bainda	BJP	20,203	5,256
89	Faridabad	Avtar Singh Bhadana	INC	29,679	Ramchander Bainda	BJP	22,952	6,727
90	Tigaon	Avtar Singh Bhadana	INC	32,598	Ramchander Bainda	BJP	18,459	14,139
