= Sonipat Lok Sabha constituency =

Lok Sabha constituency in Haryana, India

Coordinates: 29.0°N 77.1°E

Sonipat HR-6
- Lok Sabha constituency
- Interactive Map Outlining Sonipat Lok Sabha constituency

Constituency details
- Country: India
- Region: North India
- State: Haryana
- Assembly constituencies: Ganaur; Rai; Kharkhauda; Sonipat; Gohana; Baroda; Julana; Safidon; Jind
- Established: 1977
- Reservation: None

Member of Parliament
- 18th Lok Sabha
- Incumbent Satpal Brahamchari
- Party: INC
- Alliance: INDIA
- Elected year: 2024

Sonipat Lok Sabha constituency (earlier spelt as Sonepat) is one of the 10 Lok Sabha (parliamentary) constituencies in Haryana state in northern India.satpal barmchari won the seat and mohan lal badoli lose from Satpal barmchari who was former mla candidate from haridawar

== Assembly segments ==
At present, Sonipat Lok Sabha constituency comprises nine Vidhan Sabha (legislative assembly) constituencies. These are:

#	Name	District	Member	Party	Leading (in 2024)
28	Ganaur	Sonipat	Devender Kadyan	IND	BJP
29	Rai	Sonipat	Krishna Gahlawat	BJP	BJP
30	Kharkhauda (SC)	Sonipat	Pawan Kharkhauda	BJP	INC
31	Sonipat	Sonipat	Nikhil Madan	BJP	BJP
32	Gohana	Sonipat	Arvind Sharma	BJP	INC
33	Baroda	Sonipat	Indu Raj Narwal	INC	INC
34	Julana	Jind	Vinesh Phogat	INC	INC
35	Safidon	Jind	Ram Kumar Gautam	BJP	BJP
36	Jind	Jind	Krishan Lal Middha	BJP	BJP

== Members of Parliament ==
Year	Member	Party
1952-76: Constituency did not exist
1977	Mukhtiar Singh Malik	Janata Party
1980	Ch. Devi Lal	Janata Party (Secular)
1984	Dharampal Singh Malik	Indian National Congress
1989	Kapil Dev Shastri	Janata Dal
1991	Dharampal Singh Malik	Indian National Congress
1996	Arvind Sharma	Independent
1998	Rana Kaushal Singh Chauhan	Indian National Lok Dal
1999	Rana Kaushal Singh Chauhan	Bharatiya Janata Party
2004	Rana Kaushal Singh Chauhan	Bharatiya Janata Party
2009	Jitender Singh Malik	Indian National Congress
2014	Ramesh Chander Kaushik	Bharatiya Janata Party
2019	Ramesh Chander Kaushik	Bharatiya Janata Party
2024	Satpal Brahamchari	Indian National Congress

== Election results ==
=== 2024 ===
2024 Indian general election: Sonipat
Party	Candidate	Votes	%	±%
INC	Satpal Brahamchari	548,682	48.82	▲11.39
BJP	Mohan Lal Badoli	5,26,866	46.88	▼5.15
BSP	Umesh Gahlawat	12,822	1.14	NA
INLD	Anoop Singh	11,523	1.03	▲0.22
NOTA	None of the above	2,320	0.21	▼0.01
Majority		21,816	1.94	▼12.66
Turnout		11,27,054	63.42	▼7.61
INC gain from BJP		Swing		

=== 2019 ===
2019 Indian general elections: Sonipat
Party	Candidate	Votes	%	±%
BJP	Ramesh Chander Kaushik	587,664	52.03	▲16.84
INC	Bhupinder Singh Hooda	4,22,800	37.43	▲10.08
JJP	Digvijay Singh Chautala	51,162	4.53	New
LSP	Raj Bala Saini	35,046	3.10	New
INLD	Surender Kumar Chhikara	9,149	0.81	▼25.99
NOTA	None of the Above	2,464	0.22	▼0.02
Majority		1,64,864	14.60	▲6.76
Turnout		11,31,146	71.03	▲1.48
BJP hold		Swing		

=== 2014 ===
2014 Indian general elections: Sonipat
Party	Candidate	Votes	%	±%
BJP	Ramesh Chander Kaushik	347,203	35.19	▲10.27
INC	Jagbir Singh Malik	2,69,789	27.35	▼20.22
INLD	Padam Singh Dahiya	2,64,404	26.80	▲26.80
AAP	Jai Singh Thekedar	48,597	4.93	▲4.93
BSP	Suman Singh	24,103	2.44	▼13.40
NOTA	None of the Above	2,403	0.24	▲0.24
Majority		77,414	7.84	▼14.81
Turnout		9,85,638	69.55	▲4.80
BJP gain from INC		Swing	▼12.38	

=== 2009 ===
2009 Indian general elections: Sonipat
Party	Candidate	Votes	%	±%
INC	Jitender Singh Malik	338,795	47.56	
BJP	Kishan Singh Sangwan	1,77,511	24.92	
BSP	Devraj Diwan	1,12,837	15.84	
HJC(BL)	Pt. Umesh Sharma	42,400	5.95	
Majority		1,61,284	22.64	
Turnout		7,12,258	64.75	
INC gain from BJP		Swing		

== See also ==
- Sonipat district
- Political families of Haryana
