= List of by-elections to the Haryana Legislative Assembly =

The following is a list of by-elections held for the Haryana Legislative Assembly, India, since its formation in 1956.

== 13th Assembly ==
=== Haryana ===
S.No	Date	Constituency	MLA before elections	Party before election	Elected MLA	Party after election
1	28 January 2019	Jind	Hari Chand Middha	Indian National Lok Dal	Krishan Lal Middha	Bharatiya Janata Party

== 14th Assembly ==
=== 2020 ===
S.No	Date	Constituency	MLA before election	Party before election	Elected MLA	Party after election
1	3 November 2020	Baroda	Krishan Hooda	Indian National Congress	Indu Raj Narwal	Indian National Congress

=== 2021 ===
S.No	Date	Constituency	MLA before election	Party before election	Elected MLA	Party after election
46	30 October 2021	Ellenabad	Abhay Singh Chautala	Indian National Lok Dal	Abhay Singh Chautala	Indian National Lok Dal

=== 2022 ===
Date	S.No	Constituency	MLA before election	Party before election	Elected MLA	Party after election
3 November 2022	47	Adampur	Kuldeep Bishnoi	Indian National Congress	Bhavya Bishnoi	Bharatiya Janata Party

=== 2024 ===
Date	Constituency		Previous MLA		Reason	Elected MLA	
25 May 2024	21	Karnal	Manohar Lal Khattar	Bharatiya Janata Party	Resigned on 13 March 2024	Nayab Singh Saini	Bharatiya Janata Party
