= Arvind Kumar Sharma =

Indian politician

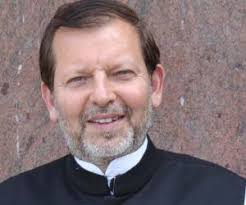

Cabinet Minister, Government of Haryana
- Incumbent
- Assumed office 17 October 2024
- Governor: Bandaru Dattatreya; Ashim Kumar Ghosh
- Chief Minister: Nayab Singh Saini
- Ministry and Departments: Co-operation; Jails; Elections; Heritage & Tourism

Member of Haryana Legislative Assembly
- Incumbent
- Assumed office 8 October 2024
- Preceded by: Jagbir Singh Malik
- Constituency: Gohana

Member of Parliament, Lok Sabha
- In office 23 May 2019 – 4 June 2024
- Preceded by: Deepender Singh Hooda
- Succeeded by: Deepender Singh Hooda
- Constituency: Rohtak
- In office 13 May 2004 – 16 May 2014
- Preceded by: Ishwar Dayal Swami
- Succeeded by: Ashwini Kumar Chopra
- Constituency: Karnal
- In office 15 May 1996 – 10 March 1998
- Preceded by: Dharam Pal Singh Malik
- Succeeded by: Kishan Singh Sangwan
- Constituency: Sonipat

Personal details
- Born: 25 November 1962 (age 63) M.P. Majra(now Birhar Majra), Punjab, India (now in Haryana, India)
- Party: Bharatiya Janata Party (2014–present)
- Other political affiliations: Indian National Congress; Bahujan Samaj Party; Shiv Sena (1966–2022); Independent politician
- Spouse: Rita Sharma (m. 1989)
- Children: 2
- Education: Gujarat University (BDS); Maharshi Dayanand University (MDS)

Arvind Kumar Sharma (born 25 November 1962) is an Indian dental surgeon, politician who currently represents the Gohana Assembly constituency in the Haryana Legislative Assembly. He was also a Member of Parliament in the 17th Lok Sabha from Rohtak (Lok Sabha constituency). He represented the Karnal (Lok Sabha constituency) constituency of Haryana in 15th Lok Sabha and was a member of the Indian National Congress but he joined Bharatiya Janata Party in 2019.

== Personal life ==
Sharma was born on 25 November 1962 to Satguru Dass Sharma and Bimla Devi in the village of M.P. Majra (now Birhar Majra) in Jhajjar district of Haryana. He completed his Bachelor of Dental Surgery from Gujarat University, Ahmedabad and Master of Dental Surgery from Maharshi Dayanand University, Rohtak. Sharma married Rita Sharma on 9 November 1989, with whom he has a son and a daughter. He is a medical practitioner, social worker and agriculturist.

== Political career ==
In January 2014, he left Indian National Congress and joined Bahujan Samaj Party and was named chief ministerial candidate. He lost from both Yamunanagar and Julana seats and was pushed to the third slot in both the seats.

In 2019, he joined Bharatiya Janata Party and contested from Rohtak Lok Sabha seat in 2019 Indian general election and defeated Deepender Singh Hooda of Indian National Congress with margin of 7,503 votes. However, in 2024 Lok Sabha election, he lost to Hooda by 345,298 votes.

== Electoral performance ==
Year	Election	Party	Constituency Name	Result
1996	11th Lok Sabha	Independent	Sonipat	Won
1998	12th Lok Sabha	Shiv Sena	Sonipat	Lost
2004	14th Lok Sabha	Indian National Congress	Karnal	Won
2009	15th Lok Sabha	Indian National Congress	Karnal	Won
2014	16th Lok Sabha	Indian National Congress	Karnal	Lost
2014	13th Haryana Assembly	Bahujan Samaj Party	Julana	Lost
2014	13th Haryana Assembly	Bahujan Samaj Party	Yamunanagar	Lost
2019	17th Lok Sabha	Bharatiya Janata Party	Rohtak	Won
2024	18th Lok Sabha	Bharatiya Janata Party	Rohtak	Lost
2024	15th Haryana Assembly	Bharatiya Janata Party	Gohana	Won
