= Ramesh Chander Kaushik =

Indian politician

Member of Parliament, Lok Sabha
- In office 26 May 2014 – 2024
- Preceded by: Jitender Singh Malik
- Succeeded by: Satpal Brahamchari
- Constituency: Sonipat

Personal details
- Born: 3 December 1956 (age 69) Samaspur, Punjab (now Haryana), India
- Party: Bharatiya Janata Party
- Spouse: Smt. Luxmi Devi
- Children: 2
- Education: Chaudhary Charan Singh University
- Occupation: Advocate
- As of 15 December, 2014

Ramesh Chander Kaushik is a former Indian politician and member of parliament to the 16th Lok Sabha from Sonipat (Lok Sabha constituency), Haryana. He won his seat in the 2014 Indian general election as a Bharatiya Janata Party candidate. He was retained as the party candidate for the 2019 elections and defeated his opponent Bhupinder Singh Hooda, former chief minister of Haryana to keep the seat. As MP he was representative of the BJP in the Sonipat region and had ties to the right wing RSS organisation.

== Early Political Career ==
He started his political career as a candidate for the Haryana Vikas Party in the 1991 Haryana assembly election where he unsuccessfully contested the erstwhile seat of Kailana in Sonipat. In the 1996 election he contested the seat again and won, as the HVP won the most seats in the Harayana Assembly. He was made a cabinet minister in the Haryana Government by incoming chief minister Bansilal Lai. In 2004 when the HVP merged into the INC he became a member of Congress. In the 2005 election he contested Rai constituency for the INC and won, being made CPS of CM BS Hooda in Haryana. In the 2009 elections Hooda replaced him as Rai candidate with Jai Tirath Dahiya, who went on to win the seat.

== Later Political Career ==
In 2013 he defected to the BJP as it was gaining popularity, alongside other congress members such as Rao Inderjeet, Chaudhary Birender and Kuldeep Bishnoi. He went on to be the BJP candidate for Sonipat in the 2014 general elections, defeating the Congress candidate Jagbir Malik. In the 2019 election he was re-elected with a majority of 14.60% against his former ally BS Hooda of Congress. In 2024 he did not contest his seat, the BJP candidacy went to Mohan Lal Badoli who lost to the INC candidate Satpal Brahamchari.

As a BJP MP he was a member of the parliamentary standing committee on petroleum and natural gas.
