= Parmanand Adhir =

Indian politician and writer (1939–2013)

- Parmanand Adhir

Member of Legislative Assembly, Haryana
- In office 1987–1991
- Preceded by: Brij Mohan
- Succeeded by: Mange Ram Gupta
- Constituency: Jind

Minister of Public Works, Education, Food & Supplies, and Forests & Wildlife Conservation
- In office 1987–1991

Personal details
- Born: 7 October 1939 Ahirka , Jind district, Punjab Province, British India
- Died: 22 January 2013 (aged 73) Hisar, Haryana, India
- Party: Lok Dal (1987); Janata Dal (1991); All India Indira Congress (Tiwari) (1996)
- Spouse: Shanti Devi
- Children: 4 (Dharampal, Satish, Suresh, Savita)
- Education: Junior Basic Training (JBT); Prabhakar, F.A. and B.A.; M.A. (English)
- Occupation: Politician, poet, writer, teacher

Parmanand "Adhir" (7 October 1939 – 22 january 2013) was an Indian politician, poet, and writer from Jind district in the northern Indian state of Haryana. He served as a minister in the Haryana state government and was elected to the Haryana Legislative Assembly from the Jind constituency in 1987. He unsuccessfully contested the Lok Sabha election from Hisar twice, in 1980 and 1991, and the Jind assembly seat again in 1996. After a road accident left him disabled, he devoted himself to Hindi literature, publishing more than a dozen books of poetry and short fiction under the pen name Adhir ("the impatient/restless one").

== Early life ==
Parmanand was born on 7 October 1939 in Ahirka village, Jind district, into the family of a freedom fighter. In his youth, he was also a kabaddi player before becoming a teacher.

He trained as a teacher, completing a Junior Basic Training (JBT) certification, and earned Prabhakar, F.A., B.A., and M.A. degrees in English. He worked as a schoolteacher and later taught at the college level before entering politics..

== Political career ==
Parmanand contested his first election from Hisar in the 1980 Lok Sabha general election as an independent candidate, listed in the official record as "Parma Nand S/o Moti Ram". He polled 13,857 votes (3.3%) and finishing fourth. Press profiles state he polled the highest number of votes among independent candidates in North India that year.

He was elected to the Haryana Legislative Assembly from the Jind constituency in the 1987 elections on a Lok Dal (LKD) ticket, defeating the Indian National Congress candidate Mange Ram Gupta by a margin of about 8,100 votes. During his term as an MLA (1987-1991), he served as a minister in the Haryana state government, holding portfolios including Public Works, Education, Food & Supplies, and Forests & Wildlife Conservation.

He did not retain the Jind seat in the 1991 assembly election. The same year, he contested the Lok Sabha election from Hisar again, this time on a Janata Dal (JD) ticket, polling 85,241 votes (14.0%) and finishing third, behind the Indian National Congress and Janata Party candidates. He made a final attempt to return to the Haryana Legislative Assembly from Jind in the 1996 election, contesting on an All India Indira Congress (Tiwari) ticket, but polled only 2,570 votes (2.8%) and finished fifth.

Following a road accident that left him disabled, Parmanand withdrew from active politics and did not contest any further elections, turning his attention fully to literary work.

== Disability and later life ==
Parmanand lost the use of both legs in a road accident. He continued his public and literary engagements despite his disability, Earlier in his career, he was also active on behalf of farmers' interests earlier in his career and was reportedly jailed on several occasions in connection with this activism.

== Literary career ==
Adhir began writing poetry in the 1950s and took up literary writing more seriously around 1970, though much of his early work remained unpublished during the years he was active in politics. After the road accident curtailed his political career, he frequently, published more than a dozen books by the early 2010s.

His published works include the poetry collections Rasbhari and Jaag Mitwa Jaag, the short-story collections Makadjaal and long narrative poem (khand kavya), Purushottam, based on mythological themes. Purushottam was published by Shri Angira Shodh Sansthan, an institution based in Jind that Adhir was associated with.

He also founded, edited and published two weekly Hindi-language newspapers registered from Jind district: Saptahik Mookvani and Pichhda Varg Mishra. Three of his poetry and story collections — Rasbhari, Jaag Mitwa Jaag and Makadjaal — were the subject of an M.Phil dissertation supervised by Prof. Lalchand Gupta "Mangal".

For his literary contributions, Adhir received the Vaidya Dhanraj Sahitya Shiromani Puraskar. He was also honoured at a poetry symposium (kavya goshthi) organised by the Sahitya Kala Sangam, Hisar, in January 2009.

== Personal life ==
Parmanand had four children: three sons, Dharampal Tanwar, Satish and Suresh, and a daughter, Savita. Dharampal Tanwar worked as an Executive Engineer (XEN) before retiring from government service; Satish was a farmer; Suresh worked in the Public Works Department; and Savita worked as a teacher.

Dharampal Tanwar later followed his father into politics. He joined the newly formed Jannayak Janta Party (JJP), led by Dushyant Chautala, in early 2019. He contested the Jind Assembly constituency in the 2024 Haryana Legislative Assembly election as a JJP candidate. The party was then in an electoral alliance with the Azad Samaj Party (Kanshi Ram), Founded by Chandrashekhar Azad Ravan. He lost the election.

== Death ==
Parmanand Adhir died in 22 January 2013 in Jind. His death was mourned in the Hindi press.
