= Jitender =

Jitender may refer to:

- Jitender Singh Malik, Indian politician;
- Jitender Singh Tomar, Indian politician;
- Jitender Kumar (boxer, born 1988);
- Jitender Kumar (boxer, born 1977);
