= Birhar Majra =

- Village
- Location in Haryana, India Birhar Majra (India)
- Coordinates: 28.633781°N 76.567554°E
- Country: India
- State: Haryana
- District: Jhajjar
- Tehsil: Beri

Government
  - Body: Village panchayat

Population (2011)
  - Total: 4,090

Languages
  - Official: Hindi
  - Native: Haryanvi
- Time zone: UTC+5:30 (IST)
- PIN: 124103
- Vehicle registration: HR77

Birhar Majra or बिरहड़ माजरा, is a village in the Beri tehsil of Jhajjar district in the Indian state of Haryana. Village is also known as M.P. Majra or MahmudPur Majra or Jahazgarh Majra.

== History ==
The village was historically known as Mohammadpur Majra (commonly abbreviated as M.P. Majra). The Government of Haryana officially renamed the village Birhar Majra through a gazette notification (1320-R-4-2024/7018) issued on 16 August 2024.

== Demographics ==
As per 2011 Census of India, the village had 822 households, with a total population of 4,090, of which 2,143 were males and 1,947 were females. The population largely consists of Dabas gotra.

The village is located at approximately 28.633781°N 76.567554°E. Hindi and Haryanvi are the principal languages spoken in the village. The village is administered by a Gram Panchayat under the Panchayati Raj system. It falls under the Beri Assembly constituency and the Rohtak Lok Sabha constituency.

Agriculture is the primary economic activity in the village. Wheat, mustard, bajra and paddy are among the major crops cultivated in the area. Educational facilities in the village include government-run primary and secondary schools. Higher education institutions are available in nearby towns such as Beri, Jhajjar and Rohtak.

== Transportation ==
=== Roads ===
Birhar Majra is situated on NH 334B with direct road access to Delhi, Chandigarh, Rohtak, Bhiwani, Charkhi Dadri, Gurgaon, Hisar and Jaipur.

=== Metro ===
This village has no direct metro connectivity. The nearest Metro station on the Delhi metro Green Line is Brigadier_Hoshiyar_Singh_metro_station located in the Devilal Park in Bahadurgarh 35 kilometres away and Najafgarh Dhansa Bus Stand metro station 55 kilometres away.

=== Railways ===
The nearest railway station to Birhar Majra is Jhajjar railway station at a distance of 8 km. Other major stations in nearby cities are: Rohtak 36 km; Bhiwani 55 km; Rewari 50 km; and Delhi 60 km.

== Notable people ==
- Sunil Dabas, coach of national female kabaddi team of India.
- Arvind Kumar Sharma, Indian dental surgeon and politician

== See also ==
- Beri
- Jhajjar
- Charkhi Dadri
- Rohtak
- Gurgaon
