= Satpal Brahamchari =

Indian politician

Member of Parliament, Lok Sabha
- Incumbent
- Assumed office 2024
- Preceded by: Ramesh Chander Kaushik
- Constituency: Sonipat

Personal details
- Party: Indian National Congress

Satpal Brahamchari is an Indian politician and social worker. He is currently serving as a Member of Parliament of 18th Lok Sabha representing Sonipat. He belongs to Indian National Congress.He was born in Gangoli Village Jind District.
