= Devender Kadyan =

Indian politician

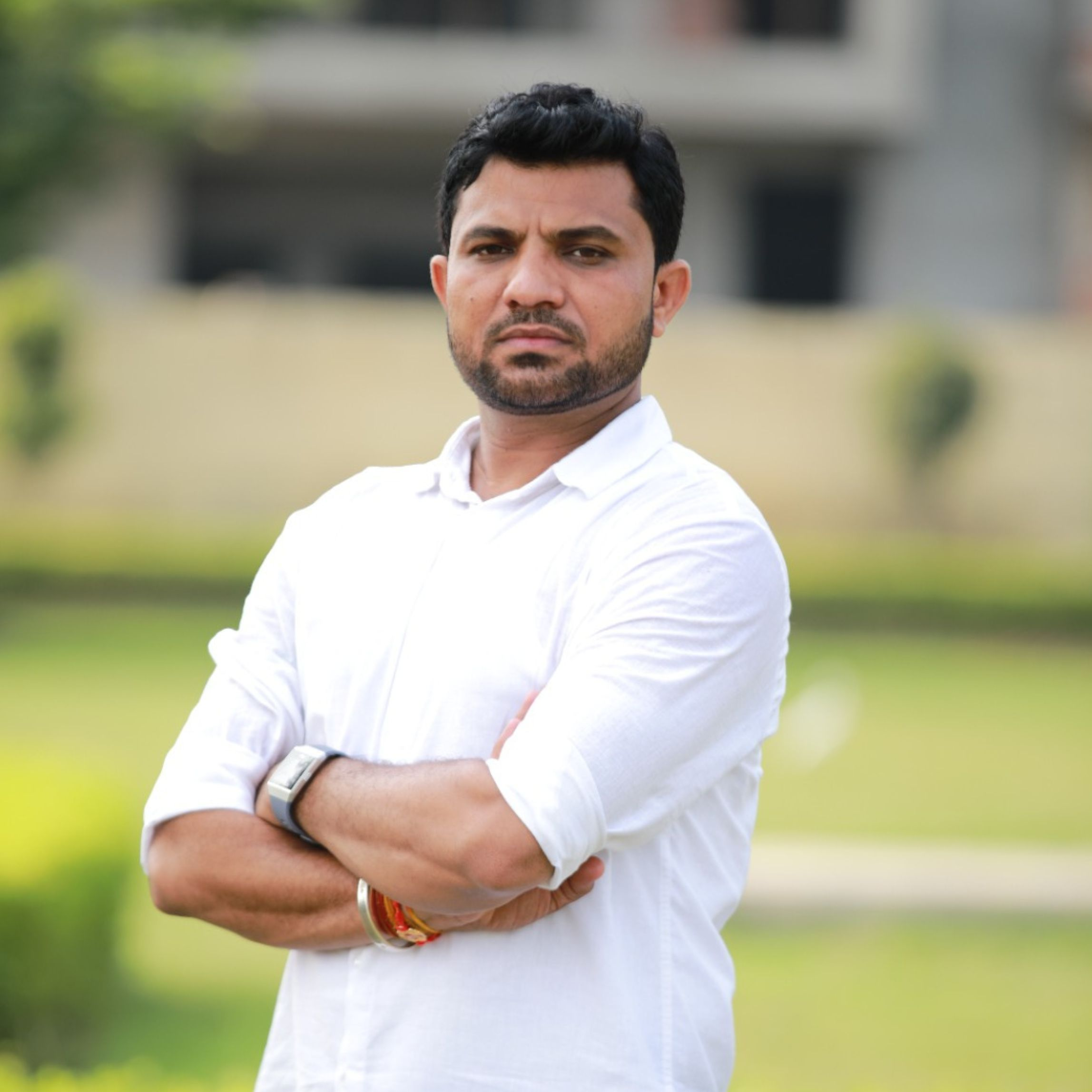

Member of Haryana Legislative Assembly
- Incumbent
- Assumed office 8 October 2024
- Preceded by: Nirmal Rani
- Constituency: Ganaur

Personal details
- Profession: Politician

Devender Kadyan is an Indian politician from Haryana. He is a Member of the Haryana Legislative Assembly from 2024, representing Ganaur Assembly constituency. He resigned from BJP a few days before 2024 polls after being denied a ticket, contested as an independent, and became an MLA.

== See also ==
- 2024 Haryana Legislative Assembly election
- Haryana Legislative Assembly
