= Sunil Dabas =

Indian kabaddi coach

Sunil Dabas is a coach of the national women's kabaddi team of India. Over the years, she has coached the team to win seven international gold medals, including the 2010 Asian Games and the 2012 World Cup. She was awarded the Dronacharya Award in 2012, and the Padma Shri in 2014 by the Government of India.

== Biography ==
Dabas was born and brought up in Birhar Majra (formally Mohammadpur Majra) village in Beri tehsil, of Jhajjar district, Haryana, India. After her schooling at her native village, she did her M.A. and Master of Physical Education (MPhEd), from Maharshi Dayanand University, Rohtak, thereafter she did her M.Phil. from Kurukshetra University, and Ph.D. in sports psychology from Agra University.

== Career ==
She has been the coach of national female kabaddi team since 2005. Under her, the team won seven gold medals in international championships which include 2006 South Asian Games, 2nd Asian Championship in 2007, 3rd Asian Championship in 2007, 2009 South Asian Games, 2010 Asian Games, 2012 Women's Kabaddi World Cup and 4th Indoor Asian Games in 2013.

She is an associate professor and the Head of the Department of Physical Education at Dronacharya Government Post-Graduate College, Gurgaon.

== Awards ==
She was awarded Dronacharya Award for excellence in sports coaching, by the Government of India, in 2012. She was the first woman coach from Haryana and the fourth in India to receive such award. She was awarded Padma Shri, the fourth highest civilian award in India in 2014. She received Sports Women Achiever Award 2014 from the Government of Haryana.

== Bibliography ==
She has written and edited following books:

- Theory of Scientific Sports Training
- Physical Fitness and Yoga
- Principles and Foundations of Physical Education
- Physical Activity and Health
- Health and Yoga
- Sharirik Shikshake Sidhantatatha Mulaadhar (Hindi)
- Sharirik Gatividhiaur Swasthaya (Hindi)
- Swasthevam Yog (Hindi)
- Sharirik fitness and Yog (Hindi)
- SharirikShikshakiPrayogicPustika (Hindi)
- Physical Education Practical Book
- Sports Psychology
- Sports Biomechanics and Kinesiology (Hindi)
- Physical Fitness and Wellness (Hindi)
