= Surender Panwar =

Indian politician (born 1969)

Surender Panwar (born 1969) is an Indian politician from Haryana. He is an MLA from Sonipat Assembly constituency in Sonipat district. He won the 2019 Haryana Legislative Assembly election representing the Indian National Congress. He was nominated to contest the Sonipat seat by the Congress in the 2024 Haryana election, where he lost to Nikhil Madaan of the BJP.

== Early life and education ==
Surender Panwar was born in a Panwar Hindu Rajput family to Thakur Dalip Singh. He completed his Class 12 in 1988 from Madhyamik Shisha Mandal board, Bhopal, Madhya Pradesh before discontinuing his studies.

== Career ==
Panwar won from Sonipat Assembly constituency representing the Indian National Congress in the 2019 Haryana Legislative Assembly election. He polled 79,438 votes and defeated his nearest rival, Kavita Jain of the Bharatiya Janata Party, by a margin of 32,878 votes. He was nominated to contest the Sonipat seat by the Congress in the 2024 Haryana election, where he lost to Nikhil Madaan of the BJP by a margin of 29,627 votes.
