= Jind Assembly constituency =

Constituency of the Haryana legislative assembly in India

Coordinates: 29.32°N 76.32°E

Jind
- Constituency No. 36 for the Haryana Legislative Assembly

Constituency details
- Country: India
- Region: North India
- State: Haryana
- Division: Hisar
- District: Jind
- Lok Sabha constituency: Sonipat
- Established: 1952
- Total electors: 2,03,349
- Reservation: None

Member of Legislative Assembly
- 15th Haryana Legislative Assembly
- Incumbent Krishan Lal Middha
- Party: BJP
- Alliance: NDA
- Elected year: 2024

Jind Assembly constituency is one of the 90 assembly constituencies of Haryana a northern state of India. Jind is part of Sonipat Lok Sabha constituency.

== Members of Legislative Assembly ==
Year	Member	Party
1952	Chaudhary Dal Singh	Indian National Congress
1954	Chaudhary Dal Singh	Indian National Congress
1957	Inder Singh	Scheduled Castes Federation
1957	Bhala Ram	Scheduled Castes Federation
1962	Ram Singh	Swatantra Party
1967	Daya Krishan	Indian National Congress
1968	Daya Krishan	Indian National Congress
1972	Chaudhary Dal Singh	Indian National Congress (O)
1977	Mange Ram Gupta	Independent
1982	Brij Mohan	Lok Dal
1987	Chaudhary Parma Nand	Lok Dal
1991	Mange Ram Gupta	Indian National Congress
1996	Brij Mohan	Haryana Vikas Party
2000	Mange Ram Gupta	Indian National Congress
2005	Mange Ram Gupta	Indian National Congress
2009	Hari Chand Middha	Indian National Lok Dal
2014	Hari Chand Middha	Indian National Lok Dal
2019^	Krishan Lal Middha	Bharatiya Janata Party
2019	Krishan Lal Middha	Bharatiya Janata Party
2024	Krishan Lal Middha	Bharatiya Janata Party

^By-Poll

== Election results ==
=== Assembly Election 2024 ===
2024 Haryana Legislative Assembly election: Jind
Party	Candidate	Votes	%	±%
BJP	Dr. Krishan Lal Middha	68,920	50.96	▲3.76
INC	Mahavir Gupta	53,060	39.24	▲32.80
Independent	Pradeep Singh Gill	7,639	5.65	New
AAP	Wazir Dhanda	2,078	1.54	New
INLD	Narender Nath Sharma	1,127	0.83	▼0.48
JJP	Dharam Pal Tanwar	1,014	0.75	▼36.34
NOTA	None of the Above	547	0.40	▼0.09
Margin of victory		15,860	11.73	▲1.61
Turnout		1,35,236	66.38	▼0.36
Registered electors		2,03,349		▲9.96
BJP hold		Swing	▲3.76	

=== Assembly Election 2019 ===
2019 Haryana Legislative Assembly election: Jind
Party	Candidate	Votes	%	±%
BJP	Dr. Krishan Lal Middha	58,370	47.20	▲8.54
JJP	Mahabir Gupta	45,862	37.09	New
INC	Anshul Singla	7,958	6.44	▼10.95
BSP	Sumer Singh Jangra	5,144	4.16	New
LSP	Vinod Saini	3,108	2.51	New
INLD	Vijender Kumar	1,625	1.31	▼1.33
NOTA	None of the Above	608	0.49	▲0.23
Margin of victory		12,508	10.12	▲0.23
Turnout		1,23,656	66.74	▼8.98
Registered electors		1,85,268		▲7.23
BJP hold		Swing	▲8.54	

=== Assembly by-election 2019 ===
2019 Haryana Legislative Assembly by-election: Jind
Party	Candidate	Votes	%	±%
BJP	Dr.Krishan Lal Middha	50,578	38.66	▲14.53
JJP	Digvijay Singh Chautala	37,648	28.78	New
INC	Randeep Surjewala	22,742	17.38	▲4.84
	Pt. Vinod Ashri	13,582	10.38	New
INLD	Umed Singh	3,454	2.64	▼23.35
NOTA	None of the Above	345	0.26	New
Margin of victory		12,930	9.88	▲8.03
Turnout		1,30,828	75.72	▼0.12
Registered electors		1,72,774		▲7.65
BJP gain from INLD		Swing	▲12.67	

=== Assembly Election 2014 ===
2014 Haryana Legislative Assembly election: Jind
Party	Candidate	Votes	%	±%
INLD	Dr. Hari Chand Middha	31,631	25.99	▼10.39
BJP	Surinder Singh Barwala	29,374	24.13	▲23.59
INC	Pramod Sehwag	15,267	12.54	▼15.44
BSP	Sudhir Gautam	13,225	10.87	▼0.89
HJC(BL)	Ramesh Kumar Saini	12,246	10.06	▼1.84
Independent	Tek Ram Kandela	11,223	9.22	
Independent	Brij Mohan Singla	4,293	3.53	
CPI(M)	Comrade Ramesh Chander	1,057	0.87	
HLP	Dr. Dharampal Jain	859	0.71	
Margin of victory		2,257	1.85	▼6.54
Turnout		1,21,716	75.84	▲1.28
Registered electors		1,60,496		▲27.82
INLD hold		Swing	▼10.39	

=== Assembly Election 2009 ===
2009 Haryana Legislative Assembly election: Jind
Party	Candidate	Votes	%	±%
INLD	Dr. Hari Chand Middha	34,057	36.38	▲12.68
INC	Mange Ram Gupta	26,195	27.98	▼11.35
HJC(BL)	Brij Mohan Singla	11,141	11.90	
BSP	Ramesh Kumar Saini	11,010	11.76	▲10.08
Independent	Balwant Singh	8,220	8.78	
LJP	Amarjeet	702	0.75	▼2.09
BJP	Swami Raghvanand	507	0.54	▼9.71
Margin of victory		7,862	8.40	▼7.23
Turnout		93,621	74.56	▼0.02
Registered electors		1,25,564		▼16.08
INLD gain from INC		Swing	▼2.95	

=== Assembly Election 2005 ===
2005 Haryana Legislative Assembly election: Jind
Party	Candidate	Votes	%	±%
INC	Mange Ram Gupta	43,883	39.33	▼4.9
INLD	Surender Singh	26,448	23.70	▼15.59
Independent	Brij Mohan Singla	21,100	18.91	
BJP	Sriniwas Verma	11,437	10.25	▲5.72
LJP	Inderjit Kaur	3,171	2.84	
BSP	Balwan Singh	1,879	1.68	
Independent	Mahabir Gupta	736	0.66	
Margin of victory		17,435	15.62	▲10.69
Turnout		1,11,588	74.58	▲4.73
Registered electors		1,49,623		▲11.05
INC hold		Swing	▼4.90	

=== Assembly Election 2000 ===
2000 Haryana Legislative Assembly election: Jind
Party	Candidate	Votes	%	±%
INC	Mange Ram Gupta	41,621	44.22	▲19.97
INLD	Gulshan Lal	36,978	39.29	
Independent	Balwant Singh Dalamwala	5,604	5.95	
BJP	Rameshwar Dass	4,262	4.53	
HVP	Shiv Narain	3,856	4.10	▼40.38
Independent	Sombir Pahalwan	782	0.83	
Margin of victory		4,643	4.93	▼15.30
Turnout		94,112	69.88	▼0.14
Registered electors		1,34,740		▲2.80
INC gain from HVP		Swing	▼0.26	

=== Assembly Election 1996 ===
1996 Haryana Legislative Assembly election: Jind
Party	Candidate	Votes	%	±%
HVP	Brij Mohan Singla	40,803	44.48	
INC	Mange Ram Gupta	22,245	24.25	▼23.33
SAP	Shanker Dass	15,959	17.40	
BSP	Jai Parkash	3,888	4.24	
AIIC(T)	Parma Nand	2,570	2.80	
Independent	Suresh Kumar S/O Maman Ram	933	1.02	
Independent	Harish Kumar	873	0.95	
Janhit Morcha	Ram Chander	492	0.54	
Margin of victory		18,558	20.23	▼1.48
Turnout		91,732	72.64	▲2.14
Registered electors		1,31,075		▲19.69
HVP gain from INC		Swing	▼3.10	

=== Assembly Election 1991 ===
1991 Haryana Legislative Assembly election: Jind
Party	Candidate	Votes	%	±%
INC	Mange Ram Gupta	35,346	47.58	▲5.41
JP	Tek Ram S/O Jug Lal	19,213	25.86	
JD	Ramdhir Singh	8,719	11.74	
BJP	Sham Lal	6,621	8.91	
Independent	Anil	675	0.91	
Independent	Om Singh	597	0.80	
LKD	Rajinder Goyat	589	0.79	▼52.32
Independent	Balwan Singh S/O Dal Singh	389	0.52	
Margin of victory		16,133	21.72	▲10.77
Turnout		74,294	69.58	▼7.30
Registered electors		1,09,513		▲11.14
INC gain from LKD		Swing	▼5.53	

=== Assembly Election 1987 ===
1987 Haryana Legislative Assembly election: Jind
Party	Candidate	Votes	%	±%
LKD	Parma Nand	39,323	53.11	▲6.36
INC	Mange Ram Gupta	31,221	42.17	▼4.33
Independent	Sant Lal	1,016	1.37	
Independent	Harnek Singh	928	1.25	
Margin of victory		8,102	10.94	▲10.69
Turnout		74,040	76.28	▲0.03
Registered electors		98,538		▲27.94
LKD hold		Swing	▲6.36	

=== Assembly Election 1982 ===
1982 Haryana Legislative Assembly election: Jind
Party	Candidate	Votes	%	±%
LKD	Brij Mohan Singla	27,045	46.75	
INC	Mange Ram Gupta	26,899	46.50	
Independent	Ram Charan	1,036	1.79	
Independent	Hawa Singh	540	0.93	
Independent	Devi Dayal	516	0.89	
Independent	Janki	375	0.65	
Independent	Diwana	353	0.61	
Margin of victory		146	0.25	▼14.07
Turnout		57,848	76.20	▲5.53
Registered electors		77,021		▲25.71
LKD gain from Independent		Swing	▲9.80	

=== Assembly Election 1977 ===
1977 Haryana Legislative Assembly election: Jind
Party	Candidate	Votes	%	±%
Independent	Mange Ram Gupta	15,751	36.95	
JP	Pratap Singh	9,646	22.63	
Independent	Dal Singh	7,374	17.30	
Independent	Narain Singh	5,047	11.84	
Independent	Ram Singh	2,362	5.54	
Independent	Bhana Ram	1,031	2.42	
Independent	Gulab Singh	507	1.19	
Independent	Dhian Chand	313	0.73	
Independent	Barhmanand	252	0.59	
Independent	Balwant	246	0.58	
Margin of victory		6,105	14.32	▲2.26
Turnout		42,626	70.31	▼1.73
Registered electors		61,269		▼16.14
Independent gain from INC(O)		Swing	▼17.33	

=== Assembly Election 1972 ===
1972 Haryana Legislative Assembly election: Jind
Party	Candidate	Votes	%	±%
INC(O)	Dal Singh	28,281	54.29	
INC	Daya Krishan	21,999	42.23	▼9.54
Independent	Devkinandan	1,631	3.13	
SSP	Tilak Raj	185	0.36	
Margin of victory		6,282	12.06	▲7.40
Turnout		52,096	72.82	▲16.79
Registered electors		73,062		▲16.28
INC(O) gain from INC		Swing	▲2.52	

=== Assembly Election 1968 ===
1968 Haryana Legislative Assembly election: Jind
Party	Candidate	Votes	%	±%
INC	Daya Krishan	17,733	51.77	▼7.5
Independent	Shanker Dass	16,136	47.11	
Independent	Zile Singh	385	1.12	
Margin of victory		1,597	4.66	▼19.28
Turnout		34,254	55.71	▼16.53
Registered electors		62,833		▲1.40
INC hold		Swing		

=== Assembly Election 1967 ===
1967 Haryana Legislative Assembly election: Jind
Party	Candidate	Votes	%	±%
INC	Daya Krishan	26,089	59.26	
Independent	I. Singh	15,548	35.32	
Independent	Telu	1,322	3.00	
Independent	B. Ram	700	1.59	
Independent	Sarupa	362	0.82	
Margin of victory		10,541	23.95	
Turnout		44,021	74.65	
Registered electors		61,965		
INC win (new seat)				

== See also ==
- Jhajjar
- List of constituencies of the Haryana Legislative Assembly
