= Kavita Jain =

Indian politician

Cabinet Minister Government of Haryana
- In office 26 October 2014 – 27 October 2019
- Ministry: Term
- Minister of Women & Child Development: 26 October 2014 - 27 October 2019
- Minister of Urban Local Bodies: 22 July 2016 - 27 October 2019
- Minister of Social Justice & Empowerment: 26 October 2014 - 22 July 2016
- Minister of Scheduled Castes & Backward Classes Welfare: 26 October 2014 - 24 July 2015

Member of Haryana Legislative Assembly
- In office 2009–2019
- Preceded by: Anil Kumar Thakkar
- Succeeded by: Surendra Panwar
- Constituency: Sonipat

Personal details
- Born: 2 September 1972 (age 53) Rohtak, Haryana; India
- Party: Bharatiya Janata Party
- Spouse: Rajiv Jain
- Children: 1 daughter and 1 son
- Education: M.Com, B. Ed
- Occupation: Politician

Kavita Surender Kumar Jain (born 2 September 1972) is a politician, former MLA for Sonipat and former cabinet minister in the Government of Haryana, India.

== Political career ==
In 2009 and again in 2014, as a candidate of the BJP from Sonepat, she was elected to the Haryana Legislative Assembly, India. On 26 October 2014, she was sworn in as Cabinet Minister in the Government of Haryana.

As a minister, she has been in charge of the following departments:

- Department of Urban Local Bodies, Haryana
- Department of Women & Child Development, Haryana
- Department of Law and Justice, Haryana

== Personal life ==
Jain is married to Rajiv Jain, a former media advisor to the Chief Minister of Haryana. They have a daughter and a son.

Jain completed M.Com and B.Ed from Rohtak.
