= Jai Tirath Dahiya =

Indian politician

Member of the Haryana Legislative Assembly
- In office 2009–2019
- Preceded by: Ramesh Chander Kaushik
- Succeeded by: Mohan Lal Badoli
- Constituency: Rai

Personal details
- Born: 20 May 1952 (age 74) Sonipat, Haryana, India
- Party: Indian National Congress
- Spouse: Smt.Aruna Dahiya
- Children: 2
- Parent: Rizak Ram Dahiya
- Education: Panjab University
- Profession: Lawyer

Jai Tirath Dahiya (born 20 May 1952) is an Indian politician and a member of the Haryana Legislative Assembly from the Indian National Congress, representing the Rai Vidhan Sabha constituency in Haryana. He is a two-term member of the Haryana Legislative Assembly.

== Political career ==
Dahiya represents the Rai Vidhan Sabha constituency in Haryana and contested his first successful election in 2009. In the 2009 Haryana Legislative Assembly election, Dahiya was given an Indian National Congress ticket and was pitted against Inderjeet, a candidate from the Indian National Lok Dal. Dahiya won that election by a margin of 4,666 votes, securing a total 35,514 votes and defeating his nearest rival Inderjeet from the Indian National Lok Dal who secured 30,848 votes.

The 2014 Haryana Legislative Assembly election was a referendum of sorts as the Indian National Congress-led government was in power in the state for 10 years and anti-incumbency was a factor. There was a three-sided contest this time around with Dahiya on an Indian National Congress ticket, Inderjeet on an Indian National Lok Dal ticket, and Krishna Gahlawat on a Bharatiya Janata Party ticket. Dahiya won that election by a margin of only 3 votes, securing a total of 36,703 votes. Dahiya's nearest rivals Inderjeet from the Indian National Lok Dal and Krishna Gahlawat on a Bharatiya Janata Party secured 36,700 and 34,523 votes, respectively. The victory by 3 votes was the smallest margin of victory by any candidate in the 2014 Haryana Legislative Assembly election.

== Personal life ==
Ch Jai Tirath was born on 20 May 1952 in Sonipat, Haryana, to Ch. Rizak Ram Dahiya. He completed his education (Bachelor of Arts and Law) in Chandigarh. Dahiya is a lawyer by profession. He practised in Sonepat District Courts for more than three decades. He is counted among the most successful criminal lawyers in this area. He married Smt. Aruna Dahiya, who is a teacher by profession, and the couple have two children: Ch Arjun Dahiya and Mr. Rajan Dahiya.
