= Sonipat Assembly constituency =

Legislative Assembly constituency in Haryana, India

Coordinates: 28.95°N 77.09°E

- Constituency No. 31 for the Haryana Legislative Assembly

Constituency details
- Country: India
- Region: North India
- State: Haryana
- District: Sonipat
- Lok Sabha constituency: Sonipat
- Established: 1967
- Total electors: 2,50,225
- Reservation: None

Member of Legislative Assembly
- 15th Haryana Legislative Assembly
- Incumbent Nikhil Madaan
- Party: BJP
- Elected year: 2024

Sonipat Assembly constituency is one of the 90 constituencies in the Haryana Legislative Assembly of Haryana a north state of India. Sonipat is also part of Sonipat Lok Sabha constituency.

Nikhil Madaan is the current MLA from Sonipat.

== Members of the Legislative Assembly ==
Year	Member	Party
1967	Mohan Lal	Indian National Congress
1968	Mukhtiar Singh Malik	Bharatiya Jana Sangh
1972	Chiranji Lal	Indian National Congress
1977	Devi Das	Janata Party
1982	Devi Das	Bharatiya Janata Party
1987	Devi Das	Bharatiya Janata Party
1991	Sham Dass	Indian National Congress
1996	Devraj Diwan	Independent
2000	Devraj Diwan	Independent
2005	Anil Singh Thakur(Chauhan)	Indian National Congress
2009	Kavita Jain	Bharatiya Janata Party
2014	Kavita Jain	Bharatiya Janata Party
2019	Surender Panwar	Indian National Congress
2024	Nikhil Madaan	Bhartiya Janata Party

== Election results ==
=== Assembly Election 2024 ===
2024 Haryana Legislative Assembly election: Sonipat
Party	Candidate	Votes	%	±%
BJP	Nikhil Madaan	84,827	58.59	▲23.71
INC	Surender Panwar	55,200	38.13	▼21.38
AAP	Devinder Gautam	1,200	0.83	▼0.42
INLD	Sardharam Singh	1,026	0.71	▲0.30
NOTA	None of the Above	729	0.50	▲0.01
Margin of victory		29,627	20.46	▼4.17
Turnout		1,44,776	57.66	▼4.10
Registered electors		2,50,225		▲16.18
BJP gain from INC		Swing	▼0.92	

=== Assembly Election 2019 ===
2019 Haryana Legislative Assembly election: Sonipat
Party	Candidate	Votes	%	±%
INC	Surender Panwar	79,438	59.51	▲34.51
BJP	Kavita Jain	46,560	34.88	▼10.91
LSP	Hans Raj	1,845	1.38	
AAP	Vimal Kishor	1,661	1.24	
BSP	Azad Singh	1,337	1.00	▲0.05
JJP	Amit	835	0.63	
NOTA	Nota	654	0.49	
INLD	Balkishan Sharma	547	0.41	▼23.62
Margin of victory		32,878	24.63	▲3.83
Turnout		1,33,483	61.76	▼6.95
Registered electors		2,16,117		▲19.66
INC gain from BJP		Swing	▲13.72	

=== Assembly Election 2014 ===
2014 Haryana Legislative Assembly election: Sonipat
Party	Candidate	Votes	%	±%
BJP	Kavita Jain	56,832	45.79	▼0.64
INC	Dev Raj Diwan	31,022	25.00	▼18.18
INLD	Surender Panwar	29,826	24.03	▲18.64
BSP	Anil Ankush	1,176	0.95	▼1.66
HJC(BL)	Arun Kaushik	895	0.72	▼0.07
CPI	Rajiv Verma	755	0.61	
Margin of victory		25,810	20.80	▲17.55
Turnout		1,24,102	68.71	▲5.92
Registered electors		1,80,608		▲38.74
BJP hold		Swing	▼0.64	

=== Assembly Election 2009 ===
2009 Haryana Legislative Assembly election: Sonipat
Party	Candidate	Votes	%	±%
BJP	Kavita Jain	37,954	46.43	▲38.62
INC	Anil Singh Thakur(Chauhan)	35,297	43.18	▲12.03
INLD	Sushil Jogi	4,411	5.40	▼14.31
BSP	Khurshid	2,134	2.61	▲0.09
HJC(BL)	Satbir	645	0.79	
Independent	Joginder	514	0.63	
Margin of victory		2,657	3.25	▼0.63
Turnout		81,745	62.80	▼1.14
Registered electors		1,30,175		▼21.58
BJP gain from INC		Swing	▲15.28	

=== Assembly Election 2005 ===
2005 Haryana Legislative Assembly election: Sonipat
Party	Candidate	Votes	%	±%
INC	Anil Singh Thakur(Chauhan)	33,057	31.15	▲21.56
Independent	Rajiv Kumar	28,941	27.27	
INLD	Satinder Kumar	20,915	19.71	
NCP	Devraj Dewan	9,523	8.97	▲8
BJP	Lalit Batra	8,284	7.81	▼23.85
BSP	Satpal	2,671	2.52	
Independent	Sityender	1,085	1.02	
Independent	Narender	636	0.60	
Margin of victory		4,116	3.88	▼0.23
Turnout		1,06,130	63.93	▲5.15
Registered electors		1,66,004		▲15.01
INC gain from Independent		Swing	▼4.61	

=== Assembly Election 2000 ===
2000 Haryana Legislative Assembly election: Sonipat
Party	Candidate	Votes	%	±%
Independent	Dev Raj Diwan	30,341	35.76	
BJP	Devi Dass	26,856	31.65	▲20.28
HVP	Rajiv Kumar	16,803	19.80	
INC	Ashok Kumar	8,134	9.59	▲3.11
CPI(M)	Shardha Nand Solanki	1,881	2.22	
NCP	Lalit	828	0.98	
Margin of victory		3,485	4.11	▼37.66
Turnout		84,843	58.78	▼3.00
Registered electors		1,44,338		▲0.28
Independent hold		Swing	▼17.39	

=== Assembly Election 1996 ===
1996 Haryana Legislative Assembly election: Sonipat
Party	Candidate	Votes	%	±%
Independent	Dev Raj Diwan	47,269	53.15	
SP	Om Parkash S/O Hari Singh	10,129	11.39	
BJP	Ram Singh	10,116	11.38	▼5.57
SAP	Prem S/O Khera	7,365	8.28	
INC	Sham Dass	5,760	6.48	▼30.59
Independent	Anil	4,029	4.53	
SHS	Ram Chander	505	0.57	
Independent	Ramdhari	494	0.56	
AIIC(T)	Om Parkash S/O Manohar Lal	477	0.54	
Margin of victory		37,140	41.76	▲29.32
Turnout		88,927	64.40	▲2.89
Registered electors		1,43,933		▲22.63
Independent gain from INC		Swing	▲16.09	

=== Assembly Election 1991 ===
1991 Haryana Legislative Assembly election: Sonipat
Party	Candidate	Votes	%	±%
INC	Sham Dass	25,623	37.07	▲7.81
JP	Satender	17,023	24.63	
BJP	Devi Dass	11,715	16.95	▼36.29
JD	Ram Phal	7,371	10.66	
Independent	Om Parkash S/O Hari Singh	5,781	8.36	
Independent	Rajinder S/O Siri Ram	436	0.63	
Independent	Hukam Chand	364	0.53	
Margin of victory		8,600	12.44	▼11.53
Turnout		69,122	60.61	▼5.53
Registered electors		1,17,372		▲15.12
INC gain from BJP		Swing	▼16.16	

=== Assembly Election 1987 ===
1987 Haryana Legislative Assembly election: Sonipat
Party	Candidate	Votes	%	±%
BJP	Devi Das	34,962	53.23	▲7.39
INC	Sham Dass	19,217	29.26	▼1.71
Independent	Sumer Chand	6,584	10.02	
Independent	Sunehra	961	1.46	
Independent	Kanwar Singh Dahiya	917	1.40	
Independent	Dalbir	581	0.88	
VHP	Jai Pal	460	0.70	
Independent	Virender	392	0.60	
Independent	Suraj Bhan	361	0.55	
Independent	Manohar Lal	342	0.52	
Margin of victory		15,745	23.97	▲9.10
Turnout		65,676	65.35	▼1.62
Registered electors		1,01,952		▲23.99
BJP hold		Swing	▲7.39	

=== Assembly Election 1982 ===
1982 Haryana Legislative Assembly election: Sonipat
Party	Candidate	Votes	%	±%
BJP	Devi Das	24,890	45.84	
INC	Mohan Lal	16,813	30.97	▲1.9
CPI(M)	Shardha Nand Solanki	5,752	10.59	
Independent	Sumer Chand	3,576	6.59	
Independent	Kalu Ram	712	1.31	
Independent	Subash	658	1.21	
JP	Jitender Kumar	634	1.17	▼59.27
Independent	Ram Kumar	373	0.69	
Margin of victory		8,077	14.88	▼16.50
Turnout		54,296	67.24	▲2.94
Registered electors		82,223		▲18.52
BJP gain from JP		Swing	▼14.60	

=== Assembly Election 1977 ===
1977 Haryana Legislative Assembly election: Sonipat
Party	Candidate	Votes	%	±%
JP	Devi Das	26,456	60.44	
INC	Chiranji Lal	12,722	29.06	▼27.67
Independent	Rattan Lal	2,698	6.16	
Independent	Jagdish Rai	662	1.51	
VHP	Om Prakash	364	0.83	
Independent	Rajbir Singh	329	0.75	
CPI	Sat Pal	309	0.71	
Independent	Hawa Singh	233	0.53	
Margin of victory		13,734	31.38	▲13.08
Turnout		43,773	63.71	▼5.48
Registered electors		69,375		▲7.19
JP gain from INC		Swing	▲3.70	

=== Assembly Election 1972 ===
1972 Haryana Legislative Assembly election: Sonipat
Party	Candidate	Votes	%	±%
INC	Chiaranji Lal	25,183	56.74	▲16.71
ABJS	Vas Dev	17,063	38.44	▼17.71
CPI(M)	Chander Bhan	1,505	3.39	
Independent	Satya Pal	635	1.43	
Margin of victory		8,120	18.29	▲2.17
Turnout		44,386	69.86	▲11.30
Registered electors		64,723		▲12.64
INC gain from ABJS		Swing	▲0.58	

=== Assembly Election 1968 ===
1968 Haryana Legislative Assembly election: Sonipat
Party	Candidate	Votes	%	±%
ABJS	Chaudhary Mukhtiar Singh Malik	18,480	56.15	▲12.71
INC	Dewan Dwarka Khosla	13,174	40.03	▼5.7
Independent	Dev Raj Diwan	894	2.72	
Independent	Om Parkash	235	0.71	
Independent	Ram Phal Alias Lekh Ram	128	0.39	
Margin of victory		5,306	16.12	▲13.84
Turnout		32,911	58.45	▼14.56
Registered electors		57,461		▲5.26
ABJS gain from INC		Swing	▲10.43	

=== Assembly Election 1967 ===
1967 Haryana Legislative Assembly election: Sonipat
Party	Candidate	Votes	%	±%
INC	M. Lal	17,930	45.72	
ABJS	M. Singh	17,035	43.44	
CPI(M)	C. Mal	3,057	7.80	
RPI	M. Lal	1,191	3.04	
Margin of victory		895	2.28	
Turnout		39,213	75.96	
Registered electors		54,589		
INC win (new seat)				
