= Krishna Gahlawat =

Indian politician

Member of Haryana Legislative Assembly
- Incumbent
- Assumed office 8 October 2024
- Preceded by: Mohan Lal Badoli
- Constituency: Rai

Personal details
- Political party: Bharatiya Janata Party
- Profession: Politician

Krishna Gahlawat is an Indian politician from Haryana. She is a Member of the Haryana Legislative Assembly from 2024, representing Rai Assembly constituency as a Member of the Bharatiya Janata Party.

== See also ==
- 2024 Haryana Legislative Assembly election
- Haryana Legislative Assembly
