= Dabas (clan) =

Indian clan

- Jat clan
- Ethnicity: Punjabis, Haryanvis
- Language: Punjabi, Haryanvi
- Religion: Sikhism, Hinduism

Dabas is an exogamous, patrilineal Jat gotra (clan) of India. Among their locales are the Haryana state and Delhi.

== Notable persons ==
- Parvin Dabas, Indian film actor
