= Rai Assembly constituency =

Legislative Assembly constituency in Haryana State, India

Coordinates: 28.93°N 77.1°E

- Constituency No. 29 for the Haryana Legislative Assembly

Constituency details
- Country: India
- Region: North India
- State: Haryana
- District: Sonipat
- Lok Sabha constituency: Sonipat
- Established: 1967
- Total electors: 1,99,340
- Reservation: None

Member of Legislative Assembly
- 15th Haryana Legislative Assembly
- Incumbent Krishna Gahlawat
- Party: BJP
- Elected year: 2024

Rai Assembly constituency is one of the 90 Legislative Assembly constituencies of Haryana state in India.

It is part of Sonipat district.

== Members of the Legislative Assembly ==
Year	Member	Party
1967	Rizaq Ram	Indian National Congress
1968	Jaswant Singh Chauhan	Indian National Congress
1972	Rizaq Ram	Indian National Congress (O)
1977	Rizaq Ram	Janata Party
1982	Jaswant Singh Chauhan	Indian National Congress
1987	Maha Singh	Lokdal
1991	Jaipal Singh Tushir	Janata Party
1996	Surajmal Antil	Samata Party
2000	Surajmal Antil	Indian National Lok Dal
2005	Ramesh Chander Kaushik	Indian National Congress
2009	Jai Tirath Dahiya	Indian National Congress
2014	Jai Tirath Dahiya	Indian National Congress
2019	Mohan Lal Badoli	Bharatiya Janata Party
2024	Krishna Gahlawat	Bharatiya Janata Party

== Election results ==
=== Assembly Election 2024 ===
2024 Haryana Legislative Assembly election: Rai
Party	Candidate	Votes	%	±%
BJP	Krishna Gahlawat	64,614	46.08%	▲8.09
INC	Jai Bhagwan Antil	59,941	42.75%	▲6.99
Independent	Prateek Rajkumar Sharma	12,262	8.74%	New
NOTA	None of the Above	486	0.35%	New
Margin of victory		4,673	3.33%	▲1.10
Turnout		1,40,219	70.16%	▲1.85
Registered electors		1,99,340		▲14.28
BJP hold		Swing	▲8.09	

=== Assembly Election 2019 ===
2019 Haryana Legislative Assembly election: Rai
Party	Candidate	Votes	%	±%
BJP	Mohan Lal Badoli	45,377	37.99%	▲8.62
INC	Jai Tirath Dahiya	42,715	35.76%	▲4.54
JJP	Ajit Antil	17,137	14.35%	
LSP	Raj Kumar Sharma	8,422	7.05%	
BSP	Pramjeet	2,890	2.42%	▲0.01
INLD	Inderjeet	637	0.53%	▼30.69
Bharatiya Samtawadi Party (A)	Sunil Kumar S/O Bhim Singh	540	0.45%	
Margin of victory		2,662	2.23%	▲2.23
Turnout		1,19,455	68.31%	▼8.29
Registered electors		1,74,882		▲13.95
BJP gain from INC		Swing	▲6.77	

=== Assembly Election 2014 ===
2014 Haryana Legislative Assembly election: Rai
Party	Candidate	Votes	%	±%
INC	Jai Tirath Dahiya	36,703	31.22%	▼9.9
INLD	Inderjeet	36,700	31.22%	▼4.5
BJP	Krishna Gahlawat	34,523	29.37%	▲26.19
HJC(BL)	Ranjit Kaushik	3,299	2.81%	▼9.16
BSP	Satyapal Chauhan	2,837	2.41%	▼3.08
Independent	Paramjeet	646	0.55%	
Margin of victory		3	0.00%	▼5.40
Turnout		1,17,557	76.60%	▲7.05
Registered electors		1,53,468		▲23.60
INC hold		Swing	▼9.90	

=== Assembly Election 2009 ===
2009 Haryana Legislative Assembly election: Rai
Party	Candidate	Votes	%	±%
INC	Jai Tirath Dahiya	35,514	41.12%	▲1.87
INLD	Inderjeet	30,848	35.72%	▲7.38
HJC(BL)	Ranjit Singh	10,336	11.97%	
BSP	Narayan Dutt	4,747	5.50%	▲0.04
BJP	Rajpal	2,740	3.17%	▼15.66
Independent	Sushil Kumar Alias Binnu	679	0.79%	
Independent	Ravinder Nath	479	0.55%	
Margin of victory		4,666	5.40%	▼5.51
Turnout		86,361	69.55%	▼2.45
Registered electors		1,24,163		▼8.77
INC hold		Swing	▲1.87	

=== Assembly Election 2005 ===
2005 Haryana Legislative Assembly election: Rai
Party	Candidate	Votes	%	±%
INC	Ramesh Chander	38,468	39.26%	▲1.92
INLD	Ajit	27,772	28.34%	▼16.4
BJP	Raj Pal	18,451	18.83%	
BSP	Devander	5,344	5.45%	▼4.19
Independent	Om Parkash	2,475	2.53%	
Independent	Mehar Singh	1,645	1.68%	
BRP	Balbir Singh Liwan	1,348	1.38%	
RLD	Kanwal Singh	925	0.94%	▼0.53
Independent	Devander	610	0.62%	
JD(S)	Dalel	513	0.52%	
Margin of victory		10,696	10.91%	▲3.51
Turnout		97,995	72.00%	▲6.07
Registered electors		1,36,104		▲13.46
INC gain from INLD		Swing	▼5.48	

=== Assembly Election 2000 ===
2000 Haryana Legislative Assembly election: Rai
Party	Candidate	Votes	%	±%
INLD	Suraj Mal	35,381	44.74%	
INC	Satpal	29,526	37.33%	▲27.33
BSP	Balraj	7,626	9.64%	▲2.99
Independent	Jaipal Singh	4,034	5.10%	
RLD	Rameshwar	1,164	1.47%	
HVP	Kanwal Singh S/O Sube Singh	947	1.20%	▼25.42
Margin of victory		5,855	7.40%	▲1.98
Turnout		79,086	66.64%	▲5.73
Registered electors		1,19,961		▼1.50
INLD gain from SAP		Swing	▲12.70	

=== Assembly Election 1996 ===
1996 Haryana Legislative Assembly election: Rai
Party	Candidate	Votes	%	±%
SAP	Suraj Mal	23,490	32.04%	
HVP	Mohander	19,512	26.61%	
INC	Maha Singh	7,332	10.00%	▼21.83
AIIC(T)	Sham Lal	6,654	9.08%	
Independent	Shamsher	4,924	6.72%	
BSP	Dharam Pal	4,875	6.65%	
JD	Kanwal Singh	3,100	4.23%	▼15.58
Independent	Rajinder	845	1.15%	
Independent	Rajbala	565	0.77%	
Independent	Krishan Chander	445	0.61%	
Margin of victory		3,978	5.43%	▲4.50
Turnout		73,316	62.85%	▼0.31
Registered electors		1,21,785		▲13.88
SAP gain from JP		Swing	▼0.71	

=== Assembly Election 1991 ===
1991 Haryana Legislative Assembly election: Rai
Party	Candidate	Votes	%	±%
JP	Jaipal Singh Tushir	21,195	32.75%	▲29.81
INC	Jaswant Singh Chauhan	20,598	31.83%	▲5.02
JD	Shyam Lal	12,820	19.81%	
Independent	Rizaq Ram	6,230	9.63%	
BJP	Anand	2,413	3.73%	
Independent	Jagmander	782	1.21%	
Margin of victory		597	0.92%	▼37.10
Turnout		64,710	62.74%	▼10.61
Registered electors		1,06,937		▲11.39
JP gain from LKD		Swing	▼32.08	

=== Assembly Election 1987 ===
1987 Haryana Legislative Assembly election: Rai
Party	Candidate	Votes	%	±%
LKD	Maha Singh	44,264	64.83%	▲64.04
INC	Jaswant Singh Chauhan	18,305	26.81%	▼23.56
JP	Daryao Singh	2,012	2.95%	▲0.89
Independent	Devi Ram	1,676	2.45%	
Independent	Siri Kishan	1,141	1.67%	
Independent	Dharam Singh	521	0.76%	
INC(J)	Parkash	359	0.53%	
Margin of victory		25,959	38.02%	▲32.48
Turnout		68,278	72.07%	▲4.15
Registered electors		96,006		▲17.58
LKD gain from INC		Swing	▲14.46	

=== Assembly Election 1982 ===
1982 Haryana Legislative Assembly election: Rai
Party	Candidate	Votes	%	±%
INC	Jaswant Singh Chauhan	27,542	50.36%	▲12.08
Independent	Maha Singh	24,515	44.83%	
JP	Zile Singh	1,124	2.06%	▼47.83
Independent	Sopat Rai Bodh	453	0.83%	
LKD	Rajendra	429	0.78%	
Independent	Banwari	327	0.60%	
Independent	Mangli Ram	295	0.54%	
Margin of victory		3,027	5.54%	▼6.07
Turnout		54,685	68.03%	▲3.30
Registered electors		81,652		▲22.42
INC gain from JP		Swing	▲0.48	

=== Assembly Election 1977 ===
1977 Haryana Legislative Assembly election: Rai
Party	Candidate	Votes	%	±%
JP	Rizaq Ram	21,186	49.89%	
INC	Jaswant Singh Chauhan	16,258	38.28%	▼6.78
Independent	Nafe Singh	3,247	7.65%	
Independent	Ami Chand	1,316	3.10%	
Independent	Shiv Charan	236	0.56%	
VHP	Puran Anand Prakash	224	0.53%	
Margin of victory		4,928	11.60%	▲9.37
Turnout		42,467	64.40%	▼9.88
Registered electors		66,696		▲18.21
JP gain from INC(O)		Swing	▲2.59	

=== Assembly Election 1972 ===
1972 Haryana Legislative Assembly election: Rai
Party	Candidate	Votes	%	±%
INC(O)	Rizaq Ram	19,631	47.30%	
INC	Jaswant Singh Chauhan	18,702	45.06%	▼15.53
Independent	Shiv Charan	2,179	5.25%	
Independent	Dharam Pal	655	1.58%	
CPI(M)	Hoshiar Singh	334	0.80%	
Margin of victory		929	2.24%	▼35.08
Turnout		41,501	74.99%	▲23.71
Registered electors		56,422		▲4.51
INC(O) gain from INC		Swing	▼13.29	

=== Assembly Election 1968 ===
1968 Haryana Legislative Assembly election: Rai
Party	Candidate	Votes	%	±%
INC	Jaswant Singh Chauhan	16,306	60.59%	▼4.15
Independent	Dalpat Singh	6,262	23.27%	
Independent	Hukam Singh	3,200	11.89%	
VHP	Bishambar Nath Kaushik	747	2.78%	
ABJS	Kanshi Ram Tyagi	396	1.47%	▼0.52
Margin of victory		10,044	37.32%	▲24.74
Turnout		26,911	50.81%	▼13.75
Registered electors		53,985		▲10.52
INC hold		Swing	▼4.15	

=== Assembly Election 1967 ===
1967 Haryana Legislative Assembly election: Rai
Party	Candidate	Votes	%	±%
INC	Rizaq Ram	20,115	64.74%	
Independent	Jaswant Singh Chauhan	16,206	52.16%	
Independent	B. Singh	13,001	41.85%	
INC	S. Ram	11,220	36.11%	
Independent	K. Ram	3,896	12.54%	
Independent	Jagdish	785	2.53%	
Independent	R. S. C. Ram	703	2.26%	
ABJS	R. S. S. Ram	618	1.99%	
Independent	K. Ram	462	1.49%	
CPI	S. Chand	299	0.96%	
Independent	Dharma	296	0.95%	
Margin of victory		3,909	12.58%	
Turnout		31,069	67.04%	
Registered electors		48,848		
INC win (new seat)				

== See also ==
- List of constituencies of the Haryana Legislative Assembly
- Sonipat district
