= Jitender Singh Malik =

Indian politician

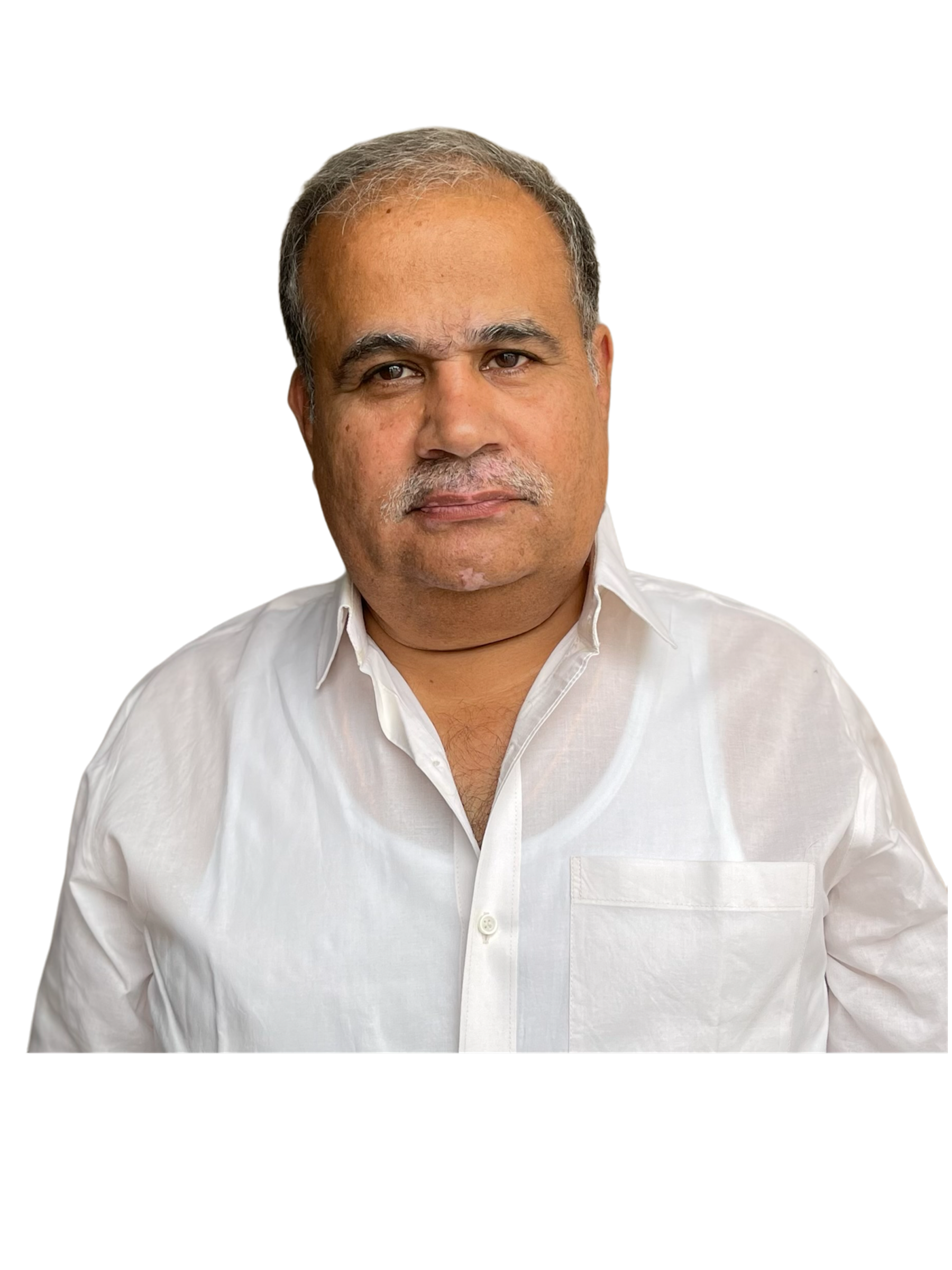

Member of parliament
- In office 2009–2014
- Preceded by: Kishan Singh Sangwan
- Succeeded by: Ramesh Chander Kaushik
- Constituency: Sonepat

Member of Legislative Assembly of Haryana
- In office 2000–2005
- In office 2005–2009

Personal details
- Born: 12 February 1970 (age 56)
- Party: Indian National Congress
- Parent: Rajinder Singh Malik (Former Minister of Health, Food Supplies and Civil Aviation Haryana) (father)
- Profession: Political and Social Worker

Jitender Singh Malik is a former member of parliament of India from Sonepat. Before elected to parliament, he was legislator from Kailana assembly (Gannur) constituency in Haryana. In 2009 general elections, He defeated three times sitting MP Chaudhary Kishan Singh Sangwan of Bharatiya Janata Party (BJP).

He is the third generation of his family to be in public service: his father, Rajender Singh Malik served as the Minister of Health, Food Supplies and Civil Aviation, Haryana, while his grandfather, Choudhary Lehri Singh Malik, was a freedom fighter, a member of the 3rd Lok Sabha (1962–67) from Rohtak, Choudhary Lehri Singh Malik, who was also a member of Punjab Vidhan Sabha from 1946 to 1961 and Irrigation and Power Minister in Punjab Government.
