= Ganaur Assembly constituency =

Legislative Assembly constituency in Haryana State, India

Coordinates: 29.14°N 77.02°E

- Constituency No. 28 for the Haryana Legislative Assembly

Constituency details
- Country: India
- Region: North India
- State: Haryana
- District: Sonipat
- Lok Sabha constituency: Sonipat
- Established: 2009
- Total electors: 1,94,417
- Reservation: None

Member of Legislative Assembly
- 15th Haryana Legislative Assembly
- Incumbent Devender Kadyan
- Party: Independent
- Elected year: 2024

Ganaur is one of the 90 Legislative Assembly constituencies of Haryana state in India.

It is part of Sonipat district.

== Members of the Legislative Assembly ==
| Election | Name | Party |
|---|---|---|
Till 2009: Constituency did not exist
| 2009 | Kuldeep Sharma | Indian National Congress |
| 2014 | Kuldeep Sharma | Indian National Congress |
| 2019 | Nirmal Chaudhary | Bharatiya Janata Party |
| 2024 | Devender Kadyan | Independent |

== Election results ==
=== Assembly Election 2024 ===
2024 Haryana Legislative Assembly election: Ganaur
| Party | Candidate | Votes | % | ±% |
|---|---|---|---|---|
| Independent | Devender Kadyan | 77,248 | 54.77% | New |
| INC | Kuldeep Sharma | 42,039 | 29.81% | ▼9.93 |
| BJP | Devender Kaushik | 17,605 | 12.48% | ▼35.85 |
| Independent | Kavita Sharma | 1,931 | 1.37% | New |
| NOTA | None of the Above | 230 | 0.16% | New |
| Margin of victory | | 35,209 | 24.96% | ▲16.37 |
| Turnout | | 1,41,038 | 72.57% | ▲4.35 |
| Registered electors | | 1,94,417 | | ▲10.80 |
| Independent gain from BJP | | Swing | ▲6.44 | |

=== Assembly Election 2019 ===
2019 Haryana Legislative Assembly election: Ganaur
| Party | Candidate | Votes | % | ±% |
|---|---|---|---|---|
| BJP | Nirmal Rani | 57,830 | 48.33 | ▲23.57 |
| INC | Kuldeep Sharma | 47,550 | 39.74 | ▲1.39 |
| JJP | Randhir Singh Malik | 6,518 | 5.45 | New |
| BSP | Jitender Kumar | 4,377 | 3.66 | ▲2.92 |
| INLD | Bijender Shekhpura | 1,480 | 1.24 | ▼30.84 |
| LSP | Rajneesh Kumar | 744 | 0.62 | |
| Margin of victory | | 10,280 | 8.59 | ▲2.32 |
| Turnout | | 1,19,656 | 68.22 | ▼9.87 |
| Registered electors | | 1,75,399 | | ▲13.81 |
| BJP gain from INC | | Swing | ▲9.98 | |

=== Assembly Election 2014 ===
2014 Haryana Legislative Assembly election: Ganaur
| Party | Candidate | Votes | % | ±% |
|---|---|---|---|---|
| INC | Kuldeep Sharma | 46,146 | 38.35% | ▼7.65 |
| INLD | Nirmal Rani | 38,603 | 32.08% | ▼2.98 |
| BJP | Jitender Singh | 29,798 | 24.76% | ▲19.41 |
| Independent | Rajesh Kumar | 3,254 | 2.70% | |
| BSP | Hari Parkash | 891 | 0.74% | |
| Margin of victory | | 7,543 | 6.27% | ▼4.68 |
| Turnout | | 1,20,343 | 78.09% | ▲6.20 |
| Registered electors | | 1,54,111 | | ▲20.82 |
| INC hold | | Swing | ▼7.65 | |

== See also ==
- List of constituencies of the Haryana Legislative Assembly
- Sonipat district
