= Nirmal Rani =

Indian politician

Nirmal Rani is an Indian politician. She was elected to the Haryana Legislative Assembly from Ganaur in the 2019 Haryana Legislative Assembly election as a member of the Bharatiya Janata Party.
