= Krishan Lal Middha =

Indian Bharatiya Janata Party politician

Deputy Speaker of the Haryana Legislative Assembly
- Incumbent
- Assumed office 25 October 2024
- Speaker: Harvinder Kalyan
- Preceded by: Ranbir Singh Gangwa
- Chief Minister: Nayab Saini

Member of Haryana Legislative Assembly
- Incumbent
- Assumed office 2019
- Preceded by: Hari Chand Middha
- Constituency: Jind

Personal details
- Born: Krishan Lal Middha Jind
- Party: Bharatiya Janata Party
- Children: 2

Krishan Lal Middha is an Indian politician. He was elected to the Haryana Legislative Assembly from Jind, Haryana in the 2019 and 2024 Haryana Legislative Assembly election as a member of the Bharatiya Janata Party. He was elected as the Deputy Speaker of the Haryana Legislative Assembly on 25 October 2024.
