= Nikhil Madaan =

Indian politician

Member of Haryana Legislative Assembly
- Incumbent
- Assumed office 8 October 2024
- Preceded by: Surender Panwar
- Constituency: Sonipat

Personal details
- Party: Bharatiya Janata Party
- Profession: Politician

Nikhil Madaan is an Indian politician from Haryana. also he is former congress mayor . He is a Member of the Haryana Legislative Assembly, elected in 2024, representing Sonipat Assembly constituency as a member of the Bharatiya Janata Party.

== See also ==
- 2024 Haryana Legislative Assembly election
- Haryana Legislative Assembly
