= Gohana Assembly constituency =

Legislative Assembly constituency in Haryana State, India

Coordinates: 29.14°N 76.69°E

Gohana
- Constituency No. 32 for the Haryana Legislative Assembly

Constituency details
- Country: India
- Region: North India
- State: Haryana
- District: Sonipat
- Lok Sabha constituency: Sonipat
- Total electors: 1,95,623
- Reservation: None

Member of Legislative Assembly
- 15th Haryana Legislative Assembly
- Incumbent Arvind Kumar Sharma
- Party: Bhartiya Janata Party
- Elected year: 2024

Gohana Assembly constituency is one of the 90 Legislative Assembly constituencies of Haryana state in India.

It is part of Sonipat district. As of 2024, its representative is Arvind Kumar Sharma of the Bhartiya Janata Party.

== Members of the Legislative Assembly ==
Year	Member	Party
1967	Ram Dhari Gaur	Indian National Congress
1968	Ram Dhari Gaur	Indian National Congress
1972	Ram Dhari Gaur	Indian National Congress
1977	Ganga Ram Lathwal	Independent
1982	Kitab Singh Malik	Lokdal
1987	Kishan Singh	Lokdal
1991	Kitab Singh Malik	Independent
1996	Jagbir Singh Malik	Haryana Vikas Party
2000	Ram Kuwar Saini	Indian National Lok Dal
2005	Dharam Pal Singh Malik	Indian National Congress
2009	Jagbir Singh Malik	Indian National Congress
2014	Jagbir Singh Malik	Indian National Congress
2019	Jagbir Singh Malik	Indian National Congress
2024	Arvind Sharma	Bharatiya Janata Party

== Election results ==
=== Assembly Election 2024 ===
2024 Haryana Legislative Assembly election: Gohana
Party	Candidate	Votes	%	±%
BJP	Arvind Kumar Sharma	57,055	43.62	▲20.84
INC	Jagbir Singh Malik	46,626	35.65	▲2.26
Independent	Harsh Chhikara	14,761	11.29	New
Independent	Rajvir Singh Dahiya	8,824	6.75	New
AAP	Shiv Kumar Rangeela	954	0.73	New
BSP	Dinesh Kumar	925	0.71	▼0.53
NOTA	None of the Above	438	0.33	New
Margin of victory		10,429	7.97	▲4.47
Turnout		1,30,786	67.03	▼1.75
Registered electors		1,95,623		▲13.35
BJP gain from INC		Swing	▲10.23	

=== Assembly Election 2019 ===
2019 Haryana Legislative Assembly election: Gohana
Party	Candidate	Votes	%	±%
INC	Jagbir Singh Malik	39,531	33.39	▼1.95
LSP	Raj Kumar Saini	35,379	29.88	
BJP	Tirath Rana	26,972	22.78	▼1.43
JJP	Kuldeep Malik	11,185	9.45	
Independent	Bhupender Vakil	1,585	1.34	
BSP	Dharambir	1,470	1.24	▼0.20
INLD	Om Parkash	779	0.66	▼31.93
Margin of victory		4,152	3.51	▲0.75
Turnout		1,18,387	68.77	▼6.85
Registered electors		1,72,140		▲11.14
INC hold		Swing	▼1.95	

=== Assembly Election 2014 ===
2014 Haryana Legislative Assembly election: Gohana
Party	Candidate	Votes	%	±%
INC	Jagbir Singh Malik	41,393	35.34	▼7.14
INLD	Dr. Krishan Chander Banger	38,165	32.58	▲5.79
BJP	Ram Chander Jangra	28,365	24.22	▲15.5
HLP	Pt. Umesh Kumar Sharma	2,219	1.89	
BSP	Dr. Gajraj Kaushik	1,692	1.44	▼0.97
Independent	Sanjay Barwasniya	1,644	1.40	
HJC(BL)	Dharam Pal Singh Malik	1,218	1.04	▼3.66
NOTA	None of the Above	612	0.52	
Margin of victory		3,228	2.76	▼12.93
Turnout		1,17,130	75.63	▲11.29
Registered electors		1,54,882		▲20.07
INC hold		Swing	▼7.14	

=== Assembly Election 2009 ===
2009 Haryana Legislative Assembly election: Gohana
Party	Candidate	Votes	%	±%
INC	Jagbir Singh Malik	35,249	42.48	▼3.71
INLD	Atul Malik	22,233	26.79	▼4.66
Independent	Kitab Singh	9,816	11.83	
BJP	Natha Singh	7,234	8.72	▼5.02
HJC(BL)	Mukesh Tayal	3,897	4.70	
BSP	Jitender Sharma (Gudha)	2,001	2.41	▼3.13
NCP	Ajay	530	0.64	
RARS	Narender Arya	515	0.62	
Independent	Ganga Singh	508	0.61	
Margin of victory		13,016	15.68	▲0.95
Turnout		82,987	64.34	▼6.11
Registered electors		1,28,991		▼0.07
INC hold		Swing	▼3.71	

=== Assembly Election 2005 ===
2005 Haryana Legislative Assembly election: Gohana
Party	Candidate	Votes	%	±%
INC	Dharam Pal Singh Malik	42,000	46.19	▲30.75
INLD	Prem Singh	28,598	31.45	▲2.24
BJP	Jatender S/O Ramdhari	12,490	13.74	
BSP	Jitender S/O Surat Singh	5,041	5.54	▲1.34
JD(S)	Kapoor Singh	545	0.60	
Independent	Ravneet Singh	542	0.60	
Independent	Suresh Chander Sharma	530	0.58	
Margin of victory		13,402	14.74	▲2.76
Turnout		90,933	70.45	▲2.56
Registered electors		1,29,083		▲10.99
INC gain from INLD		Swing	▲16.98	

=== Assembly Election 2000 ===
2000 Haryana Legislative Assembly election: Gohana
Party	Candidate	Votes	%	±%
INLD	Ram Kuwar	23,059	29.21	
HVP	Jagbir Singh Malik	13,601	17.23	▼11.65
INC	Dharam Pal Singh Malik	12,185	15.43	▼7.11
Independent	Mahender S/O Kidar Singh	7,138	9.04	
Independent	Prem Prakash	5,138	6.51	
Independent	Balbir	4,996	6.33	
Independent	Kitab Singh	4,234	5.36	
BSP	Dilbag Singh	3,315	4.20	
Independent	Satbir Singh	2,109	2.67	
Independent	Nasib Singh	1,146	1.45	
JP	Subhash	535	0.68	
Margin of victory		9,458	11.98	▲10.88
Turnout		78,950	68.52	▲0.58
Registered electors		1,16,301		▼1.02
INLD gain from HVP		Swing	▲0.33	

=== Assembly Election 1996 ===
1996 Haryana Legislative Assembly election: Gohana
Party	Candidate	Votes	%	±%
HVP	Jagbir Singh Malik	22,837	28.88	▲20.4
SAP	Kishan Singh	21,965	27.77	
INC	Ram Dhari	17,825	22.54	▼3.44
Independent	Kitab Singh	9,666	12.22	
Independent	Jai Kishan	2,015	2.55	
Independent	Raj Singh S/O Ransingh	876	1.11	
Independent	Sukhbir Singh	843	1.07	
Margin of victory		872	1.10	▼11.23
Turnout		79,085	68.98	▲3.95
Registered electors		1,17,499		▲5.41
HVP gain from Independent		Swing	▼9.43	

=== Assembly Election 1991 ===
1991 Haryana Legislative Assembly election: Gohana
Party	Candidate	Votes	%	±%
Independent	Kitab Singh	27,057	38.31	
INC	Ram Dhari	18,349	25.98	▲7.11
JP	Kishan Singh	15,185	21.50	
HVP	Rati Ram	5,989	8.48	
BJP	Balbir Singh	2,040	2.89	
Independent	Kali Ram	671	0.95	
Margin of victory		8,708	12.33	▼13.87
Turnout		70,624	65.38	▼7.45
Registered electors		1,11,469		▲8.16
Independent gain from LKD		Swing	▼6.76	

=== Assembly Election 1987 ===
1987 Haryana Legislative Assembly election: Gohana
Party	Candidate	Votes	%	±%
LKD	Kishan Singh	32,894	45.07	▼6.23
INC	Rati Ram	13,772	18.87	▼20.65
VHP	Kitab Singh	12,179	16.69	
Independent	Ram Dhari	10,775	14.76	
Independent	Mahender Singh	1,330	1.82	
Independent	Harsarup Singh	601	0.82	
Independent	Mahender Singh S/O Puran	350	0.48	
Margin of victory		19,122	26.20	▲14.42
Turnout		72,982	71.70	▼2.43
Registered electors		1,03,064		▲19.62
LKD hold		Swing	▼6.23	

=== Assembly Election 1982 ===
1982 Haryana Legislative Assembly election: Gohana
Party	Candidate	Votes	%	±%
LKD	Kitab Singh	32,372	51.30	
INC	Ramdhari Gaur	24,940	39.52	▲23.4
Independent	Shri Chand	4,753	7.53	
Independent	Rameshwar	531	0.84	
Margin of victory		7,432	11.78	▲9.07
Turnout		63,105	74.40	▲8.15
Registered electors		86,157		▲15.68
LKD gain from Independent		Swing	▲12.83	

=== Assembly Election 1977 ===
1977 Haryana Legislative Assembly election: Gohana
Party	Candidate	Votes	%	±%
Independent	Ganga Ram	18,649	38.47	
JP	Ram Dhari	17,337	35.76	
INC	Dharam Pal Singh Malik	7,814	16.12	▼24.89
Independent	Kitab Singh	3,450	7.12	
Independent	Sunehra	587	1.21	
Independent	Ram Chander	520	1.07	
Margin of victory		1,312	2.71	▼7.88
Turnout		48,481	65.66	▼9.76
Registered electors		74,479		▲25.57
Independent gain from INC		Swing	▼2.54	

=== Assembly Election 1972 ===
1972 Haryana Legislative Assembly election: Gohana
Party	Candidate	Votes	%	±%
INC	Ram Dhari Gaur	18,206	41.01	▼2.55
Independent	Har Kishan	13,505	30.42	
Akhil Bhartiya Arya Sabha	Siri Chand	5,666	12.76	
Independent	Nand Lal	4,937	11.12	
VHP	Bije Singh	1,662	3.74	
Independent	Bhim Singh	419	0.94	
Margin of victory		4,701	10.59	▲8.49
Turnout		44,395	76.27	▲7.74
Registered electors		59,313		▲8.58
INC hold		Swing	▼2.55	

=== Assembly Election 1968 ===
1968 Haryana Legislative Assembly election: Gohana
Party	Candidate	Votes	%	±%
INC	Ram Dhari	15,970	43.56	▼7.74
Independent	Har Kishan	15,202	41.47	
SWA	Rati Ram	4,953	13.51	
Independent	Abhan	327	0.89	
Independent	Suraj Parkash	207	0.56	
Margin of victory		768	2.09	▼18.52
Turnout		36,659	68.23	▼7.76
Registered electors		54,626		▲5.45
INC hold		Swing	▼7.74	

=== Assembly Election 1967 ===
1967 Haryana Legislative Assembly election: Gohana
Party	Candidate	Votes	%	±%
INC	Ram Dhari	19,898	51.30	New
Independent	H. Kishan	11,901	30.68	New
ABJS	F. Singh	5,883	15.17	New
Independent	Partap	370	0.95	New
Independent	R. Dhan	317	0.82	New
Independent	R. Pal	210	0.54	New
Independent	R. Chand	109	0.28	New
Independent	C. Ram	97	0.25	New
Margin of victory		7,997	20.62	
Turnout		38,785	76.89	
Registered electors		51,803		
INC win (new seat)				

== See also ==
- List of constituencies of the Haryana Legislative Assembly
- Sonipat district
