= Dharam Pal Singh Malik =

Indian politician

Dharampal Singh Malik

Member of Parliament, Lok Sabha
- In office 1984 - 1989, 1991 - 1996
- Constituency: Sonipat, Haryana

Member of the Haryana Legislative Assembly
- In office 2005 -2009
- Preceded by: Ram Kuwar
- Succeeded by: Jagbir Singh Malik
- Constituency: Gohana, Haryana

President of Haryana Pradesh Congress Committee
- In office 11 April 1992 - 27 February 1997
- Preceded by: Chaudhary Birender Singh
- Succeeded by: Bhupinder Singh Hooda

Personal details
- Born: 13 May 1943 (age 83) Sonipat, Punjab, British India
- Party: Indian National Congress
- Spouse: Sudha Malik
- Children: Shakti Ahlawat, Anita Malik, Vishal Malik
- Education: Bachelor of Laws
- Profession: Lawyer and Agriculturist

Dharampal Singh Malik (born 13 May 1943) is an Indian politician, lawyer, and former parliamentarian from Haryana. He served as a Member of Parliament, Lok Sabha, representing the Sonipat constituency during the 8th Lok Sabha (1984–1989) and the 10th Lok Sabha (1991–1996), and later as a Member of the Haryana Legislative Assembly from Gohana (2005–2008). A prominent figure in the Indian National Congress, he held the position of President of the Haryana Pradesh Congress Committee from 1992 to 1997. Born in the village of Bidhal in Sonipat district, Malik graduated with a Bachelor of Arts and a Bachelor of Laws (BA, LLB) from the University of Delhi, establishing a legal career before entering politics. He is recognized for his contributions to rural development and education in Haryana.

== Early life and education ==
Dharampal Singh Malik was born on 13 May 1943 into an agriculturist family of Amir Singh Malik, and Shrimati Chotto Devi and followed the principles of Arya Samaj.

He studied at Arya College, Panipat, where he enrolled in the 11th standard. He completed his Faculty of Arts (F.A.) in 1961 and obtained a Bachelor of Arts degree from the same institution in 1963. In July 1964, he enrolled at the University of Delhi and later pursued a Law degree, which he completed in 1966. Following his graduation, he practiced law under Chaudhary Lahri Singh for one year. He then received his advocate license from the Punjab and Haryana High Court in December 1966 and commenced his legal practice in 1967.

== Political career ==
Malik political career began in Delhi University, where he served as the Supreme Counsellor in 1964. Malik contested the Haryana Legislative Assembly election from Gohana on an Indian National Congress (INC) ticket in 1977 but lost to Independent candidate Ganga Ram Lathwal. He was elected to the 8th Lok Sabha in 1984, defeating Chaudhary Devi Lal. During his tenure, he served as a Member of the Committee on Subordinate Legislation in Lok Sabha in 1985 and was appointed Chairman of the Haryana State Congress MPs in Parliament the same year. In 1987, he became a Member of the Estimates Committee, Lok Sabha.

In 1991, he was re-elected to the 10th Lok Sabha and continued to serve as a Member of the Estimates Committee, Lok Sabha. In 1992, he was appointed president of the Haryana Pradesh Congress Committee. In 2005, he was elected as a member of the Haryana Legislative Assembly from Gohana constituency.

== Political offices ==
Year	Member	Party
1964–1966	Supreme councilor, University of Delhi	
1968–1984	Member, executive committee, Kanya Gurukul, khanpur kalan and Gurukul Bhainswal Kalan Sonipat	
1972	Managing director, Rohtak District Central Cooperative Bank	
1972–1977	Member of Gohana Panchayat Smiti	
1972–1976	Elected delegate to IFFCO	
1972–1973	Secretary and president of Gohana Bar Association	
1973–1974	Vice-president, Sonipat District Central Cooperative Bank	
1974–1976	Director, Marketing Cooperative Society, Gohana	
1975–1992	Founder & secretary, Arya High School, Gohana	Indian National Congress
1976	Member, executive committee, University of Delhi, Students Union	
1977	Contested Haryana Assembly election from Gohana	Indian National Congress
1978–1984	Co-convener DCC Sonipat	Indian National Congress
1978	Member, consultative committees of different departments Lok Sabha	Indian National Congress
1978	Courted arrest during Janata Regime when smt. Indira Gandhi former Prime Minister was arrested	
1983–84	Secretary and president of Gohana Bar Association	Indian National Congress
1983–1985	Member, managing committee, All India Jat Heroes' Memorial College, Rohtak	Indian National Congress
1984–2005	Member of All India Congress Committee	Indian National Congress
1984–1989	8th Lok Sabha	Indian National Congress
1984–2005	Ex-secretary of Arya High School	
1985–1987	Committee on Subordinate Legislation, Lok Sabha	Indian National Congress
1985–1989	Chairman, Haryana State Congress MPs in Parliament	Indian National Congress
1987–1989	During Chaudhary Devi Lal and Ch.Om Prakash Chautala's regime, protested against their anti public activities	Indian National Congress
1987–1989	Estimates committee	Indian National Congress
1989–1994	Chief legal advisor (Ansals Builders)	
1995	President District Cooperative Milk Union Rohtak	
1989–1992	President DCC Sonipat	Indian National Congress
1991–1996	10th Lok Sabha	Indian National Congress
1992–97	Haryana Pradesh congress committee	Indian National Congress
1992–1994	Estimates committee lok Sabha	Indian National Congress
1994–1995	Committee on Subordinate Legislation, Lok Sabha	Indian National Congress
2005–2008	Member of Haryana Legislative Assembly	Indian National Congress
