= Jagbir Singh Malik =

Indian politician

Former Cabinet Minister Government of Haryana
- Ministry and Departments: Horticulture; Technical Education

Member of the Haryana Legislative Assembly
- In office October 2009 – 8 October 2024
- Preceded by: Dharam Pal Singh Malik
- Succeeded by: Arvind Kumar Sharma
- Constituency: Gohana, Haryana
- In office 1996–2000
- Constituency: Gohana, Haryana

Personal details
- Born: 1 September 1950 (73 years) Sonipat, Haryana
- Party: Indian National Congress
- Education: Bachelor of Science; Bachelor of Laws
- Alma mater: Panjab University; Delhi University

Jagbir Singh Malik (born 1 September 1950) is an Indian politician. He served as member of the Haryana Legislative Assembly from Gohana. He served as the cabinet minister in Bansi Lal Ministry in Government of Haryana. He has been elected to the Haryana Legislative Assembly for four terms from 1996. He is a member of the Indian National Congress.
