= Kishan Singh Sangwan =

Indian politician (1948–2012)

MP
- Constituency: Sonepat

Personal details
- Born: 15 June 1948 Sonepat, Haryana
- Died: 2 December 2012 (aged 64) New Delhi
- Party: BJP
- Spouse: Roshani Devi
- Children: 2 sons and 2 daughters
- As of 16 September, 2006

Kishan Singh Sangwan (15 June 1948 – 2 December 2012) was a member of the 14th Lok Sabha of India. He represents the Sonepat constituency of Haryana and is a member of the Bharatiya Janata Party (BJP) political party.
