= Mange Ram Gupta =

Indian politician (1935–2020)

Mange Ram Gupta (13 July 1935 – 6 March 2020) a four-time MLA, served as cabinet minister thrice during the Congress governments in the state. Ahead of the Jind bypoll in 2019, Gupta had joined the Jannayak Janta Party (JJP) breaking his longtime ties with the Congress.

== Early and his political life ==
Born on 13 July 1935, Gupta contested Assembly elections from Jind Vidhan Sabha constituency eight times and won on four occasions. He remained minister in the Haryana on three occasions. He held portfolios of finance, education and transport as minister on the three occasions.

Considered the tallest leader of the Agarwal community after former CM Banarasi Dass Gupta, Gupta contested the Assembly elections for the first time as an Independent candidate from Jind constituency in 1977 and won by 15,751 votes. He was elected MLA from Jind seat on Congress ticket in 1991, 2000 and 2005.

Just before the 2019 Assembly poll in Haryana, Gupta along with his son Mahavir Gupta joined Dushyant Chautala Jannayak Janta Party on 30 September 2019. Gupta's son contested the Assembly poll on JJP ticket, but lost to Dr Krishan Middha of the BJP.

== Death ==
Gupta died after prolonged illness at his residence in Jind in March 2020. He was 85. He was cremated at Jind on Friday afternoon. The cremation was attended among others by Deputy CM Dushyant Chautala. Deputy CM Dushyant Chautala said-

Gupta was a pioneer in social service and had a special contribution in the Agrawal Society.

Leader of Opposition in the Haryana Assembly and former chief minister Bhupinder Singh Hooda also condoled the death of Gupta.
