= Mohan Lal Badoli =

Indian politician

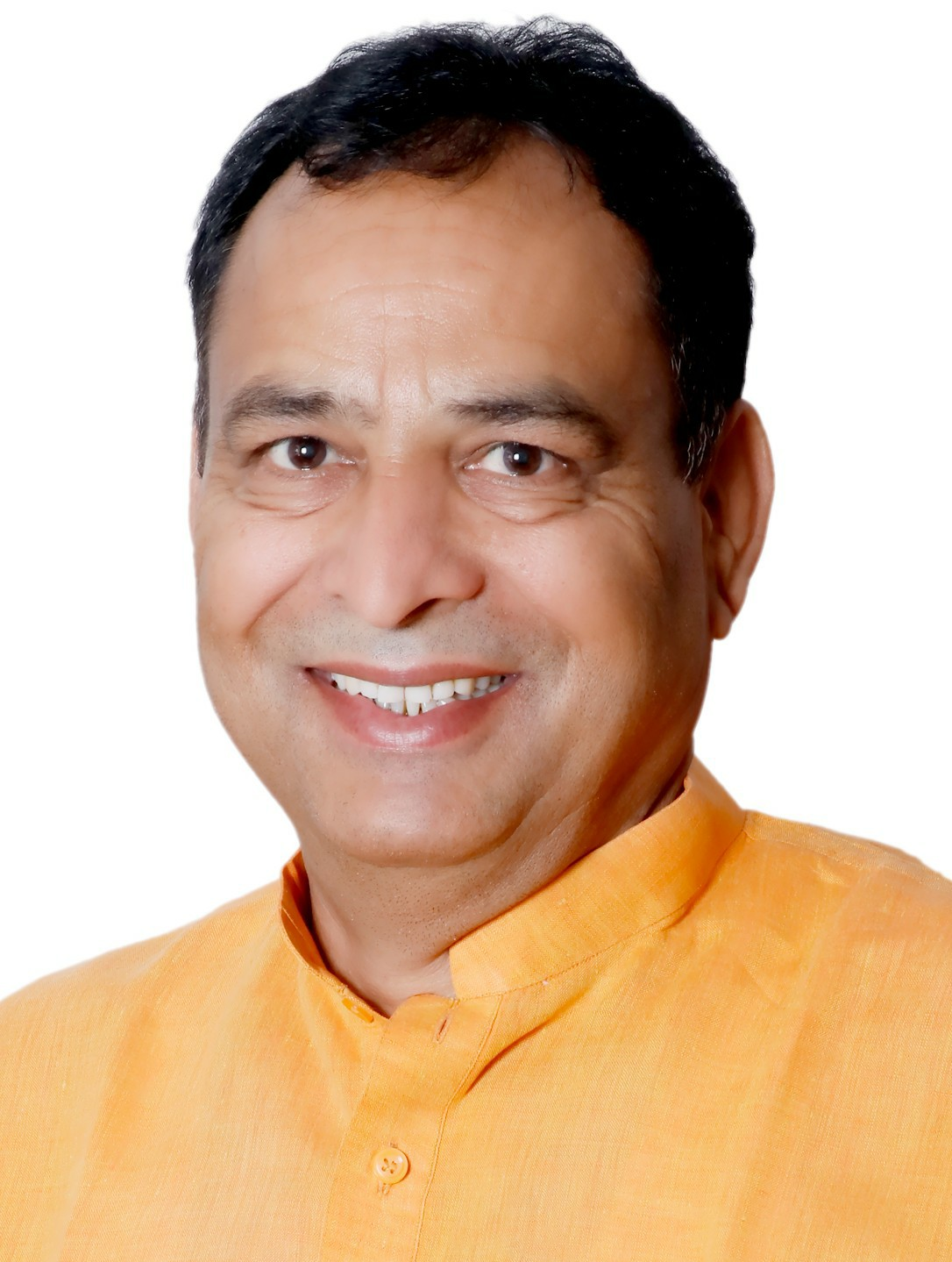

President of the Bharatiya Janata Party, Haryana
- In office 9 July 2024 – 28 May 2026
- President: J. P. Nadda; Nitin Nabin
- Preceded by: Nayab Singh Saini
- Succeeded by: Dr. Archana Gupta

Member of Haryana Legislative Assembly
- In office 24 October 2019 – 8 October 2024
- Preceded by: Jai Tirath Dahiya
- Succeeded by: Krishna Gahlawat
- Constituency: Rai

Zila Adhyaksh Sonipat
- In office 2020–2021

Pradesh Mahamantri Haryana
- In office 2021–2024

Personal details
- Born: 28 September 1963 (age 63) Badoli, Punjab, India (now in Haryana, India)
- Party: Bharatiya Janata Party
- Spouse: Geeta Devi
- Children: 2 Sons
- Website: mohanlalbadoli.com

Mohan Lal Badoli is an Indian politician from Sonipat, Haryana. Previously, he is the State Party President of Bharatiya Janata Party, Haryana. He was elected to the Haryana Legislative Assembly from Rai in the 2019 Haryana Legislative Assembly election as a member of the Bharatiya Janata Party. He handled the position of Mandal Adkhyaksh (Murthal) in 1995. He was elected as Zila Parishad during Honourable PM Atal Bihari Vajpayee's government. In 2019, he contested Legislative Assembly and won with a margin of 2,663 votes. He is the first BJP candidate ever to win from this seat i.e. Rai Vidhansabha. Mohan Lal Badoli is closely related to Rashtriya Swayamsevak Sangh from 1989.

== Personal life ==
Mohan Lal Badoli was born in Badoli village of Rai tehsil in Sonipat district Haryana. His father, Kali Ram Singh, was a respected poet in his village and fond of Poet Pandit Lakhmi Chand of Janti, Sonipat. He is a farmer and businessman.

Badoli completed his matriculation (final year of high school) from GSSS, Khevra, Sonipat. He then ran a shop in cloth market near Chiranjiv Hospital Bahalgarh Chowk, Sonipat.

== Political career ==
Badoli joined Rashtriya Swayamsevak Sangh (RSS) in 1989, and later joined BJP. He was among the very few BJP party workers of Sonipat area. During the INLD rule he was the first BJP candidate to win Zila Parishad election from Murthal Block.

In 2019, Badoli was nominated as BJP's candidate from Rai Constituency of Sonipat for the Haryana Legislative Assembly election, 2019. He was able to secure win on this seat, which was considered to be a fixed seat for INC.

In 2020, Badoli was appointed Zila Adhyaksh of BJP Sonipat. Further, in 2021, he was inducted in the core BJP Haryana team with the position of Pradesh Mahamantri. Later, He was appointed Pradesh Mahamantri (General Secretary BJP) second time in 2024. He is known for his strong commitment to BJP organization activities. He was inducted in the BJP Haryana state election committee before Loksabha 2024 elections.

Mohan Lal Badoli was the candidate of Bharatiya Janata Party from Sonipat Loksabha seat during 2024 Indian General Election. He lost with a thin margin of 21,816 after securing whopping 5,26,866 votes.

He was appointed State Party President of BJP Haryana on 9 July 2024. He played a pivotal role in BJP victory in the 2024 Haryana Legislative Assembly election. He is considered to have strengthened the coordination of BJP with RSS in Haryana.

Political controversy surrounded against him due to allegations of IPC section 376, however the FIR was quashed by in Police Investigation. Later clean chit was given on 7 February 2025 by the Himachal Pradesh, Session court.
