= Hari Chand Middha =

Indian politician (1942–2018)

Hari Chand Middha (1942–2018) was born at Jhang, West Punjab, Pakistan. He was an Indian politician who was a member of the Haryana Legislative Assembly from the Indian National Lok Dal representing the Jind constituency in Haryana. He defeated Mange Ram Gupta who was Cabinet Minister of Haryana in 2009 in the very start of his political career.

In 2014 Vidhan Sabha Polls, he again won from this constituency. Earlier, he has worked in Indian Army. Middha died on 26 August 2018 from a heart attack.
