= List of speakers of the Haryana Legislative Assembly =

Speakers of the Haryana Assembly

Speaker of the Haryana Legislative Assembly
- Seal of Haryana
- Incumbent; Harvinder Kalyan since 25 October 2024
- Haryana Legislative Assembly
- Style: The Hon’ble (formal); Mr. Speaker (informal)
- Member of: Haryana Legislative Assembly
- Residence: Chandigarh
- Seat: Gharaunda
- Appointer: Members of the Legislative Assembly
- Term length: During the life of the Haryana Legislative Assembly (five years maximum)
- Inaugural holder: Shanno Devi
- Deputy: Krishan Lal Middha

The Speaker of the Haryana Legislative Assembly is the presiding officer of the Legislative Assembly of Haryana, the main law-making body for the Indian state of Haryana. The Speaker is elected in the very first meeting of the Haryana Legislative Assembly after the general elections for a term of 5 years from amongst the members of the assembly. Speakers hold office until ceasing to be a member of the assembly or resigning from the office. The Speaker can be removed from office by a resolution passed in the assembly by an effective majority of its members. In the absence of Speaker, the meeting is presided by the Deputy Speaker.

== Speaker ==
S. No.	Name	Constituency	Tenure		Duration	Party	Assembly
Pre-Independence (1937-1947)
1	Shahab-ud-Din Virk	[Sialkot	6 April 1937	16 March 1945	7 years, 344 days	Unionist Party	1st
2	Satya Prakash Singha	West Central Punjab	21 March 1946	4 July 1947	1 year, 105 days	Unionist Party	2nd
After Independence (1947–present)
1	Kapur Singh	Ludhiana East	1 November 1947	20 June 1951	3 years, 231 days	Indian National Congress	-
2	Satya Pal	Amritsar City North	5 May 1952	18 April 1954	1 year, 348 days	Indian National Congress	1st
3	Gurdial Singh Dhillon	Tarn Taran	18 May 1954	25 April 1957	2 years, 342 days	Indian National Congress	1st
3	Gurdial Singh Dhillon	Tarn Taran	25 April 1957	13 March 1962	4 years, 322 days	Indian National Congress	2nd
4	Prabodh Chandra	Gurdaspur	14 March 1962	18 March 1964	2 years, 4 days	Indian National Congress	3rd
5	Harbans Lal Gupta	Bathinda	25 March 1964	19 March 1967	2 years, 359 days	Indian National Congress	3rd

== List ==

No	Portrait	Name	Constituency	Tenure			Assembly	Party	
1		Shanno Devi	Jagadhri	6 December 1966	17 March 1967	101 days	1st (1962 elections)	Indian National Congress	
2		Rao Birender Singh	Pataudi	17 March 1967	23 March 1967	6 days	2nd (1967 elections)	Indian National Congress	
3		Ch Sri Chand Ohlan	Hassangarh	30 March 1967	19 July 1967	111 days	2nd (1967 elections)	2nd	Vishal Haryana Party
4		Manphool Singh Chahar	Hassangarh	21 July 1967	10 July 1968	355 days	Independent	2nd	
5		Brigadier Ran Singh Ahlawat	Beri	15 July 1968	3 April 1972	3 years, 263 days	3rd (1968 elections)	Indian National Congress	
6		Banarsi Das Gupta	Bhiwani	3 April 1972	15 November 1973	1 year, 226 days	4th (1972 elections)	Indian National Congress	
7		Ch Sarup Singh		16 November 1973	4 July 1977	3 years, 230 days	4th (1972 elections)	Indian National Congress	
(5)		Brigadier Ran Singh Ahlawat	Beri	4 July 1977	8 May 1978	308 days	5th (1977 elections)	Janata Party	
8		Ram Singh	Rewari	15 May 1978	24 June 1982	4 years, 40 days	5th (1977 elections)	Indian National Congress	
9		Sardar Tara Singh	Shahbad	24 June 1982	9 July 1987	5 years, 15 days	6th (1982 elections)	Indian National Congress	
10		Harmohinder Singh Chatha		9 July 1987	9 July 1991	4 years, 0 days	7th (1987 election)	Janata Dal	
11		Ishwar Singh	Pundri	9 July 1991	22 May 1996	4 years, 318 days	8th (1991 election)	Indian National Congress	
12		Chhattar Singh Chauhan	Mundhal Khurd	22 May 1996	27 July 1999	3 years, 66 days	9th (1996 elections)	Haryana Vikas Party	
13		Ashok Arora	Thanesar	28 July 1999	1 March 2000	217 days	9th (1996 elections)	Indian National Lok Dal	
14		Satbir Singh Kadian	Naultha	9 March 2000	21 March 2005	5 years, 12 days	10th (2000 elections)	Indian National Lok Dal	
(10)		Harmohinder Singh Chatha	Pehowa	21 March 2005	12 January 2006	297 days	11th (2005 elections)	Indian National Congress	
15		Raghuvir Singh Kadian	Beri	13 January 2006	27 October 2009	3 years, 287 days	11th (2005 elections)	Indian National Congress	
(10)		Harmohinder Singh Chatha	Pehowa	28 October 2009	28 January 2011	1 year, 92 days	12th (2009 elections)	Indian National Congress	
16		Kuldeep Sharma	Ganaur	4 March 2011	2 November 2014	3 years, 243 days	12th (2009 elections)	Indian National Congress	
17		Kanwar Pal Gujjar	Jagadhri	3 November 2014	2 November 2019	4 years, 364 days	13th (2014 elections)	Bharatiya Janata Party	
18		Gian Chand Gupta	Panchkula	4 November 2019	25 October 2024	4 years, 356 days	14th (2019 elections)	Bharatiya Janata Party	
19		Harvinder Kalyan	Gharaunda	25 October 2024	Incumbent	1 year, 317 days	15th (2024 elections)	Bharatiya Janata Party	

Deputy Speaker of the Haryana Legislative Assembly of Haryana Legislative Assembly
- हरियाणा विधानसभा उपाध्यक्ष
- Incumbent; Krishan Lal Middha since 25 October 2024
- Formation: 1966

== List of Deputy Speakers ==
The following is a chronological list of official Deputy Speakers of the Haryana Legislative Assembly since its inception in 1966.

No.	Name	Term of Office		Party
1	Shanno Devi	6 December 1966	17 March 1967	Indian National Congress
2	Rao Birender Singh	17 March 1967	23 March 1967	Indian National Congress
3	Ch. Sri Chand Ohlyan	30 March 1967	19 July 1967	Vishal Haryana Party
4	Manphool Singh	21 July 1967	10 July 1968	Independent
5	Brig. Ran Singh Ahlawat	15 July 1968	3 April 1972	Indian National Congress
6	Banarsi Das Gupta	3 April 1972	15 November 1973	Indian National Congress
7	Ch. Sarup Singh	16 November 1973	4 July 1977	Indian National Congress
(5)	Brig. Ran Singh Ahlawat	4 July 1977	8 May 1978	Janata Party
8	Ram Singh	15 May 1978	24 June 1982	Indian National Congress
9	Sardar Tara Singh	24 June 1982	9 July 1987	Indian National Congress
10	Harmohinder Singh Chatha	9 July 1987	9 July 1991	Janata Dal
11	Ishwar Singh	9 July 1991	22 May 1996	Indian National Congress
12	Chhattar Singh Chauhan	22 May 1996	27 July 1999	Haryana Vikas Party
13	Ashok Arora	28 July 1999	1 March 2000	Indian National Lok Dal
14	Satbir Singh Kadian	9 March 2000	21 March 2005	Indian National Lok Dal
(10)	Harmohinder Singh Chatha	21 March 2005	12 January 2006	Indian National Congress
15	Raghuvir Singh Kadian	13 January 2006	27 October 2009	Indian National Congress
(10)	Harmohinder Singh Chatha	28 October 2009	28 January 2011	Indian National Congress
16	Kuldeep Sharma	4 March 2011	2 November 2014	Indian National Congress
17	Santosh Yadav	4 September 2015	15 October 2019	Bharatiya Janata Party
18	Ranbir Singh Gangwa	26 November 2019	10 July 2024	Bharatiya Janata Party
19	Krishan Lal Middha	25 October 2024	Present	Bharatiya Janata Party

=== Notes ===
- Shanno Devi was the first woman speaker of any State Assembly in India and also served as the first Deputy Speaker of Punjab before Haryana's formation.
- As of January 2026, the 15th Assembly is led by Speaker Harvinder Kalyan.
- Dr. Krishan Lal Middha is a medical professional and three-term MLA from the Jind constituency.

== Pro tem Speaker ==
Raghuvir Singh Kadian 2014, 2019 and 2024
