= 14th Haryana Assembly =

Indian state assembly

←	13th Assembly	15th Assembly	→

Overview
- Legislative body: Haryana Legislative Assembly
- Term: 28 October 2019 – 12 September 2024
- Election: 2019 Haryana Legislative Assembly election
- Government: Second Khattar ministry (until March 2024), First Saini ministry (since March 2024)
- Opposition: Indian National Congress
- Members: 90
- Speaker: Gian Chand Gupta
- Deputy Speaker: Ranbir Singh Gangwa
- Leader of the House: Manohar Lal Khattar (until March 2024), Nayab Singh Saini (since March 2024)
- Leader of the Opposition: Bhupinder Singh Hooda
- Party control: Bharatiya Janata Party

The Fourteenth Legislative Assembly of Haryana constituted after the 2019 Haryana Legislative Assembly elections. Legislative Assembly election was held in Haryana on 21 October 2019 to elect 90 members of the Haryana Legislative Assembly. The results were announced on 24 October 2019.

== Members of Legislative Assembly ==
District	No.	Constituency	Name	Party	Alliance	Remarks
Panchkula	1	Kalka	Pradeep Chaudhary	Indian National Congress	INDIA	
Panchkula	2	Panchkula	Gian Chand Gupta	Bharatiya Janata Party	NDA	Speaker
Ambala	3	Naraingarh	Shalley	Indian National Congress	INDIA	
Ambala	4	Ambala Cantonment	Anil Vij	Bharatiya Janata Party	NDA	
Ambala	5	Ambala City	Aseem Goel	Bharatiya Janata Party	NDA	
Ambala	6	Mulana	Varun Chaudhary	Indian National Congress	INDIA	Elected to lok sabha in 2024 polls
Ambala	6	Mulana	Vacant			
Yamunanagar	7	Sadhaura	Renu Bala	Indian National Congress	INDIA	
Yamunanagar	8	Jagadhri	Kanwar Pal Gujjar	Bharatiya Janata Party	NDA	
Yamunanagar	9	Yamunanagar	Ghanshyam Dass	Bharatiya Janata Party	NDA	
Yamunanagar	10	Radaur	Bishan Lal Saini	Indian National Congress	INDIA	
Kurukshetra	11	Ladwa	Mewa Singh	Indian National Congress	INDIA	
Kurukshetra	12	Shahbad	Ram Karan	Jannayak Janta Party		Resigned
Kurukshetra	12	Shahbad	Vaccant			
Kurukshetra	13	Thanesar	Subhash Sudha	Bharatiya Janata Party	NDA	
Kurukshetra	14	Pehowa	Sardar Sandeep Singh Saini	Bharatiya Janata Party	NDA	
Kaithal	15	Guhla	Ishwar Singh	Jannayak Janta Party		Resigned
Kaithal	15	Guhla	Vaccant			
Kaithal	16	Kalayat	Kamlesh Dhanda	Bharatiya Janata Party	NDA	
Kaithal	17	Kaithal	Leela Ram	Bharatiya Janata Party	NDA	
Kaithal	18	Pundri	Randhir Singh Gollen	Independent	INDIA	
Karnal	19	Nilokheri	Dharam Pal Gonder	Independent	INDIA	
Karnal	20	Indri	Ram Kumar Kashyap	Bharatiya Janata Party	NDA	
Karnal	21	Karnal	Manohar Lal Khattar	Bharatiya Janata Party	NDA	Resigned on 13 March 2024
Karnal	21	Karnal	Nayab Singh Saini	Bharatiya Janata Party	NDA	Elected on 8 June 2024
Karnal	22	Gharaunda	Harvinder Kalyan	Bharatiya Janata Party	NDA	
Karnal	23	Assandh	Shamsher Singh Gogi	Indian National Congress	INDIA	
Panipat	24	Panipat Rural	Mahipal Dhanda	Bharatiya Janata Party	NDA	
Panipat	25	Panipat City	Parmod Kumar Vij	Bharatiya Janata Party	NDA	
Panipat	26	Israna	Balbir Singh	Indian National Congress	INDIA	
Panipat	27	Samalkha	Dharam Singh Chhoker	Indian National Congress	INDIA	
Sonipat	28	Ganaur	Nirmal Rani	Bharatiya Janata Party	NDA	
Sonipat	29	Rai	Mohan Lal Badoli	Bharatiya Janata Party	NDA	
Sonipat	30	Kharkhauda	Jaiveer Singh	Indian National Congress	INDIA	
Sonipat	31	Sonipat	Surender Panwar	Indian National Congress	INDIA	
Sonipat	32	Gohana	Jagbir Singh Malik	Indian National Congress	INDIA	
Sonipat	33	Baroda	Krishan Hooda	Indian National Congress	INDIA	Died on 12 April 2020
Sonipat	33	Baroda	Indu Raj Narwal	Indian National Congress	INDIA	Won in 2020 bypoll
Jind	34	Julana	Amarjeet Dhanda	Jannayak Janta Party		Resigned
Jind	34	Julana	Vaccant			
Jind	35	Safidon	Subhash Gangoli	Indian National Congress	INDIA	
Jind	36	Jind	Krishan Lal Middha	Bharatiya Janata Party	NDA	
Jind	37	Uchana Kalan	Dushyant Chautala	Jannayak Janta Party		
Jind	38	Narwana	Ram Niwas	Jannayak Janta Party		Resigned
Jind	38	Narwana	Vaccant			
Fatehabad	39	Tohana	Devender Singh Babli	Jannayak Janta Party		Resigned
Fatehabad	39	Tohana	Vaccant			
Fatehabad	40	Fatehabad	Dura Ram	Bharatiya Janata Party	NDA	
Fatehabad	41	Ratia	Lakshman Napa	Indian National Congress	INDIA	
Sirsa	42	Kalanwali	Shishpal Singh	Indian National Congress	INDIA	
Sirsa	43	Dabwali	Amit Sihag	Indian National Congress	INDIA	
Sirsa	44	Rania	Ranjit Singh Chautala	Independent	NDA	Resigned on 26 March
Sirsa	44	Rania	Vacant			
Sirsa	45	Sirsa	Gopal Kanda	Haryana Lokhit Party	NDA	
Sirsa	46	Ellenabad	Abhay Singh Chautala	Indian National Lok Dal		Won in 2021 bypoll necessitated after his resignation
Hisar	47	Adampur	Kuldeep Bishnoi	Indian National Congress	INDIA	Resigned on 4 August 2022
Hisar	47	Adampur	Bhavya Bishnoi	Bharatiya Janata Party	NDA	Won in 2022 bypoll
Hisar	48	Uklana	Anoop Dhanak	Jannayak Janta Party		Resigned
Hisar	48	Uklana	Vaccant			
Hisar	49	Narnaund	Ram Kumar Gautam	Jannayak Janta Party		Resigned
Hisar	49	Narnaund	Vaccant			
Hisar	50	Hansi	Vinod Bhayana	Bharatiya Janata Party	NDA	
Hisar	51	Barwala	Jogi Ram Sihag	Jannayak Janta Party		Resigned
Hisar	51	Barwala	Vaccant			
Hisar	52	Hisar	Kamal Gupta	Bharatiya Janata Party	NDA	
Hisar	53	Nalwa	Ranbir Singh Gangwa	Bharatiya Janata Party	NDA	Deputy Speaker
Bhiwani	54	Loharu	Jai Parkash Dalal	Bharatiya Janata Party	NDA	
Charkhi Dadri	55	Badhra	Naina Singh Chautala	Jannayak Janta Party		
Charkhi Dadri	56	Dadri	Somveer Sangwan	Independent	INDIA	Resigned
Charkhi Dadri	56	Dadri	Vaccant			
Bhiwani	57	Bhiwani	Ghanshyam Saraf	Bharatiya Janata Party	NDA	
Bhiwani	58	Tosham	Kiran Choudhry	Indian National Congress	INDIA	Resigned
Bhiwani	58	Tosham	Vaccant			
Bhiwani	59	Bawani Khera	Bishamber Singh	Bharatiya Janata Party	NDA	
Rohtak	60	Meham	Balraj Kundu	Independent		
Rohtak	61	Garhi Sampla-Kiloi	Bhupinder Singh Hooda	Indian National Congress	INDIA	Leader of the Opposition
Rohtak	62	Rohtak	Bharat Bhushan Batra	Indian National Congress	INDIA	
Rohtak	63	Kalanaur	Shakuntla Khatak	Indian National Congress	INDIA	
Jhajjar	64	Bahadurgarh	Rajinder Singh Joon	Indian National Congress	INDIA	
Jhajjar	65	Badli	Kuldeep Vats	Indian National Congress	INDIA	
Jhajjar	66	Jhajjar	Geeta Bhukkal	Indian National Congress	INDIA	
Jhajjar	67	Beri	Raghuvir Singh Kadian	Indian National Congress	INDIA	
Mahendragarh	68	Ateli	Sitaram Yadav	Bharatiya Janata Party	NDA	
Mahendragarh	69	Mahendragarh	Rao Dan Singh	Indian National Congress	INDIA	
Mahendragarh	70	Narnaul	Om Parkash Yadav	Bharatiya Janata Party	NDA	
Mahendragarh	71	Nangal Chaudhry	Abhe Singh Yadav	Bharatiya Janata Party	NDA	
Rewari	72	Bawal	Banwari Lal	Bharatiya Janata Party	NDA	
Rewari	73	Kosli	Laxman Singh Yadav	Bharatiya Janata Party	NDA	
Rewari	74	Rewari	Chiranjeev Rao	Indian National Congress	INDIA	
Gurgaon	75	Pataudi	Satya Prakash Jaravata	Bharatiya Janata Party	NDA	
Gurgaon	76	Badshahpur	Rakesh Daultabad	Independent	NDA	Died
Gurgaon	76	Badshahpur	Vacant			
Gurgaon	77	Gurgaon	Sudhir Singla	Bharatiya Janata Party	NDA	
Gurgaon	78	Sohna	Sanjay Singh	Bharatiya Janata Party	NDA	
Nuh	79	Nuh	Aftab Ahmed	Indian National Congress	INDIA	Deputy Leader of the Opposition
Nuh	80	Ferozepur Jhirka	Mamman Khan	Indian National Congress	INDIA	
Nuh	81	Punahana	Mohammad Ilyas	Indian National Congress	INDIA	
Palwal	82	Hathin	Praveen Dagar	Bharatiya Janata Party	NDA	
Palwal	83	Hodal	Jagdish Nayar	Bharatiya Janata Party	NDA	
Palwal	84	Palwal	Deepak Mangla	Bharatiya Janata Party	NDA	
Faridabad	85	Prithla	Nayan Pal Rawat	Independent	NDA	
Faridabad	86	Faridabad NIT	Neeraj Sharma	Indian National Congress	INDIA	
Faridabad	87	Badkhal	Seema Trikha	Bharatiya Janata Party	NDA	
Faridabad	88	Ballabgarh	Mool Chand Sharma	Bharatiya Janata Party	NDA	
Faridabad	89	Faridabad	Narender Gupta	Bharatiya Janata Party	NDA	
Faridabad	90	Tigaon	Rajesh Nagar	Bharatiya Janata Party	NDA	
