= 15th Haryana Assembly =

Indian state assembly

←	14th Assembly

Overview
- Legislative body: Haryana Legislative Assembly
- Term: 25 October 2024 – 2029
- Election: 2024 Haryana Legislative Assembly election
- Government: Second Saini ministry
- Opposition: Indian National Congress
- Members: 90
- Speaker: Harvinder Kalyan
- Deputy Speaker: Krishan Lal Middha
- Leader of the House: Nayab Singh Saini
- Leader of the Opposition: Bhupinder Singh Hooda
- Party control: Bharatiya Janata Party

The Fifteenth Legislative Assembly of Haryana constituted after the 2024 Haryana Legislative Assembly elections. Legislative Assembly election was held in Haryana on 5 October 2024 to elect 90 members of the Haryana Legislative Assembly. The results were announced on 8 October 2024.

== Members of Legislative Assembly ==
District	No	Constituency Name	Name	Political Party	Political Group
Panchkula	1	Kalka	Shakti Rani Sharma	BJP	NDA
Panchkula	2	Panchkula	Chander Mohan	INC	INDIA
Ambala	3	Naraingarh	Shalley Chaudhary	INC	INDIA
Ambala	4	Ambala Cantt	Anil Vij	BJP	NDA
Ambala	5	Ambala City	Nirmal Singh	INC	INDIA
Ambala	6	Mulana (SC)	Pooja Chaudhary	INC	INDIA
Yamunanagar	7	Sadhaura (SC)	Renu Bala	INC	INDIA
Yamunanagar	8	Jagadhri	Akram Khan	INC	INDIA
Yamunanagar	9	Yamunanagar	Ghanshyam Dass	BJP	NDA
Yamunanagar	10	Radaur	Shyam Singh Rana	BJP	NDA
Kurukshetra	11	Ladwa	Nayab Singh Saini	BJP	NDA
Kurukshetra	12	Shahbad (SC)	Ram Karan	INC	INDIA
Kurukshetra	13	Thanesar	Ashok Kumar Arora	INC	INDIA
Kurukshetra	14	Pehowa	Mandeep Chatha	INC	INDIA
Kaithal	15	Guhla (SC)	Devender Hans	INC	INDIA
Kaithal	16	Kalayat	Vikas Saharan	INC	INDIA
Kaithal	17	Kaithal	Aditya Surjewala	INC	INDIA
Kaithal	18	Pundri	Satpal Jamba	BJP	NDA
Karnal	19	Nilokheri (SC)	Bhagwan Das	BJP	NDA
Karnal	20	Indri	Ram Kumar Kashyap	BJP	NDA
Karnal	21	Karnal	Jagmohan Anand	BJP	NDA
Karnal	22	Gharaunda	Harvinder Kalyan (Speaker)	BJP	NDA
Karnal	23	Assandh	Yogender Singh Rana	BJP	NDA
Panipat	24	Panipat Rural	Mahipal Dhanda	BJP	NDA
Panipat	25	Panipat City	Parmod Kumar Vij	BJP	NDA
Panipat	26	Israna (SC)	Krishan Lal Panwar	BJP	NDA
Panipat	27	Samalkha	Manmohan Bhadana	BJP	NDA
Sonipat	28	Ganaur	Devender Kadyan	Independent	
Sonipat	29	Rai	Krishna Gahlawat	BJP	NDA
Sonipat	30	Kharkhauda (SC)	Pawan Kharkhauda	BJP	NDA
Sonipat	31	Sonipat	Nikhil Madan	BJP	NDA
Sonipat	32	Gohana	Arvind Kumar Sharma	BJP	NDA
Sonipat	33	Baroda	Indu Raj Narwal	INC	INDIA
Jind	34	Julana	Vinesh Phogat	INC	INDIA
Jind	35	Safidon	Ram Kumar Gautam	BJP	NDA
Jind	36	Jind	Krishan Lal Middha (Deputy Speaker)	BJP	NDA
Jind	37	Uchana Kalan	Devender Attri	BJP	NDA
Jind	38	Narwana (SC)	Krishan Kumar	BJP	NDA
Fatehabad	39	Tohana	Paramvir Singh	INC	INDIA
Fatehabad	40	Fatehabad	Balwan Singh Daulatpuria	INC	INDIA
Fatehabad	41	Ratia (SC)	Jarnail Singh	INC	INDIA
Sirsa	42	Kalanwali (SC)	Shishpal Singh	INC	INDIA
Sirsa	43	Dabwali	Aditya Devilal	Indian National Lok Dal	INLD+
Sirsa	44	Rania	Arjun Chautala	Indian National Lok Dal	INLD+
Sirsa	45	Sirsa	Gokul Setia	INC	INDIA
Sirsa	46	Ellenabad	Bharat Singh Beniwal	INC	INDIA
Hisar	47	Adampur	Chander Prakash Jangra	INC	INDIA
Hisar	48	Uklana (SC)	Naresh Selwal	INC	INDIA
Hisar	49	Narnaund	Jassi Petwar	INC	INDIA
Hisar	50	Hansi	Vinod Bhayana	BJP	NDA
Hisar	51	Barwala	Ranbir Singh Gangwa	BJP	NDA
Hisar	52	Hisar	Savitri Jindal	Independent	
Hisar	53	Nalwa	Randhir Parihar	BJP	NDA
Bhiwani	54	Loharu	Rajbir Singh Fartiya	INC	INDIA
Charkhi Dadri	55	Badhra	Umed Singh	BJP	NDA
Charkhi Dadri	56	Dadri	Sunil Satpal Sangwan	BJP	NDA
Bhiwani	57	Bhiwani	Ghanshyam Saraf	BJP	NDA
Bhiwani	58	Tosham	Shruti Choudhry	BJP	NDA
Bhiwani	59	Bawani Khera (SC)	Kapoor Valmiki	BJP	NDA
Rohtak	60	Meham	Balram Dangi	INC	INDIA
Rohtak	61	Garhi Sampla-Kiloi	Bhupinder Singh Hooda	INC	INDIA
Rohtak	62	Rohtak	Bharat Bhushan Batra	INC	INDIA
Rohtak	63	Kalanaur (SC)	Shakuntla Khatak	INC	INDIA
Jhajjar	64	Bahadurgarh	Rajesh Joon	Independent	
Jhajjar	65	Badli	Kuldeep Vats	INC	INDIA
Jhajjar	66	Jhajjar (SC)	Geeta Bhukkal	INC	INDIA
Jhajjar	67	Beri	Raghuvir Singh Kadian	INC	INDIA
Mahendragarh	68	Ateli	Arti Singh Rao	BJP	NDA
Mahendragarh	69	Mahendragarh	Kanwar Singh Yadav	BJP	NDA
Mahendragarh	70	Narnaul	Om Parkash Yadav	BJP	NDA
Mahendragarh	71	Nangal Chaudhry	Manju Chaudhary	INC	INDIA
Rewari	72	Bawal (SC)	Krishan Kumar	BJP	NDA
Rewari	73	Kosli	Anil Yadav	BJP	NDA
Rewari	74	Rewari	Laxman Singh Yadav	BJP	NDA
Gurgaon	75	Pataudi (SC)	Bimla Chaudhary	BJP	NDA
Gurgaon	76	Badshahpur	Rao Narbir Singh	BJP	NDA
Gurgaon	77	Gurgaon	Mukesh Sharma	BJP	NDA
Gurgaon	78	Sohna	Tejpal Tanwar	BJP	NDA
Nuh	79	Nuh	Aftab Ahmed	INC	INDIA
Nuh	80	Ferozepur Jhirka	Mamman Khan	INC	INDIA
Nuh	81	Punahana	Mohammad Ilyas	INC	INDIA
Palwal	82	Hathin	Mohd Israil	INC	INDIA
Palwal	83	Hodal (SC)	Harinder Singh	BJP	NDA
Palwal	84	Palwal	Gaurav Gautam	BJP	NDA
Faridabad	85	Prithla	Raghubir Tewatia	INC	INDIA
Faridabad	86	Faridabad NIT	Satish Kumar Phagna	BJP	NDA
Faridabad	87	Badkhal	Dhanesh Adlakha	BJP	NDA
Faridabad	88	Ballabgarh	Mool Chand Sharma	BJP	NDA
Faridabad	89	Faridabad	Vipul Goel	BJP	NDA
Faridabad	90	Tigaon	Rajesh Nagar	BJP	NDA
