= List of constituencies of the Haryana Legislative Assembly =

Haryana Vidhan Sabha constituencies

Haryana Legislative Assembly
- 15th Haryana Assembly

Type
- Type: Unicameral
- Term limits: 5 years
- Seats: 90

Elections
- Voting system: First past the post
- Last election: 2024

Meeting place
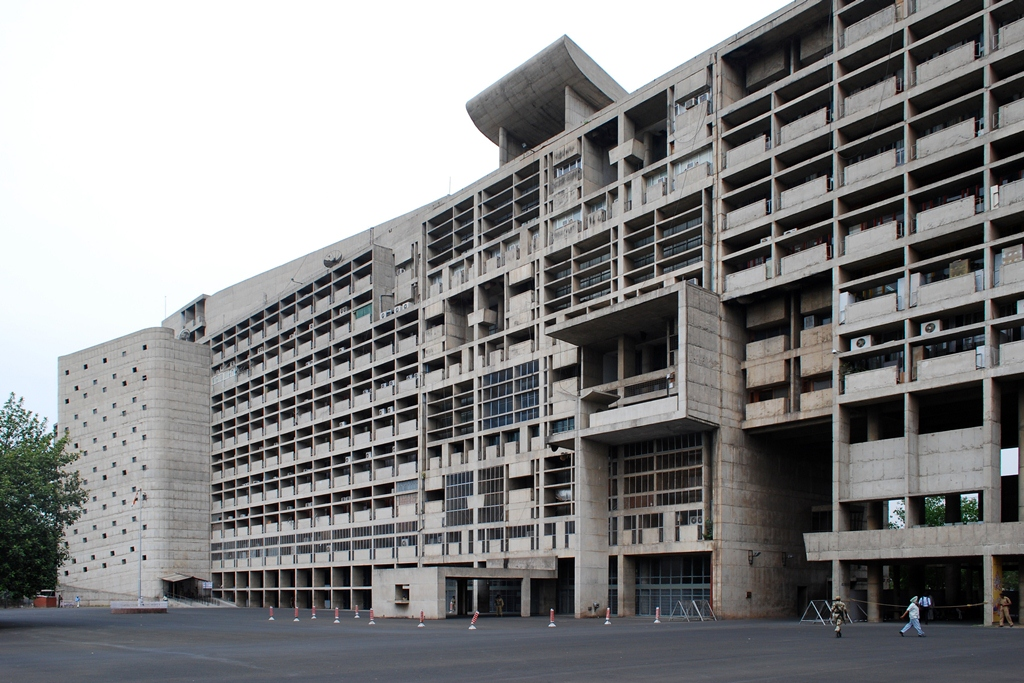
- Secretariat Building, Chandigarh

Website
- haryanaassembly.gov.in

Location of Haryana (in red) within India

The Haryana Legislative Assembly is the unicameral legislature of the state of Haryana in North India. Its seat is at Chandigarh, the capital of the state, and it sits for a term of five years unless it is dissolved early. (Note: A legislative assembly can be dissolved early, under Article 174 of the Indian Constitution, in a few situations including a hung assembly and the inability of any alliance to form a majority.) Haryana is India's twelfth-smallest state by population and the ninth-smallest by area. The assembly was created along with the state in 1967 after the passing of the Punjab Reorganisation Act, 1966. The Haryana Legislative Assembly has had 15 terms since its creation. After the latest election in 2024, the assembly is governed by the Bharatiya Janata Party, which won 48 out of the 90 seats. The Indian National Congress, the largest opposition party, has 37 seats.

Constituency boundaries are periodically redrawn by the delimitation commission which tries to keep them as geographically compact areas, and with due consideration to existing boundaries of administrative units. The latest census is used to draw the boundaries and every assembly constituency has to be completely within a parliamentary constituency. Since 1977, the Haryana Assembly has had 90 single-seat constituencies, each of which directly elects a representative based on a first past the post election.

Since the independence of India from the United Kingdom in 1947, the Scheduled Castes (SC) and Scheduled Tribes (ST) have been given reservation status, guaranteeing political representation, and the Constitution lays down the general principles of positive discrimination for SCs and STs. According to the 2011 census of India the Scheduled Castes constitute 20.2% of the population of the state, while there are no people of any Scheduled Tribes. Accordingly, the Scheduled Castes have been granted a reservation of 17 seats in the assembly.

== History ==
Changes in the constituencies of the Haryana Legislative Assembly
Year	Act/Order	Explanation	Total seats	SC-reserved seats	Election(s)
1966	Punjab Reorganisation Act, 1966	Haryana was created out of the southern parts of Punjab.	81	15	1967, 1968, 1972
1976	Delimitation of Parliamentary and Assembly Constituencies Order, 1976	There were changes in the number and reservation status of constituencies.	90	17	1977, 1982, 1987, 1991, 1996, 2000, 2005
2008	Delimitation Commission Order, 2008	There were changes in the reservation status and area covered by constituencies.	90	17	2009, 2014, 2019, 2024

== Constituencies ==
Map of assembly constituencies in Haryana

Reservation
Scheduled Castes

Constituencies of the Haryana Legislative Assembly
No.	Name	Reservation	District	Lok Sabha constituency	Electorate (2024)
1	Kalka	None	Panchkula	Ambala	200,639
2	Panchkula	None	Panchkula	Ambala	233,525
3	Naraingarh	None	Ambala	Ambala	192,340
4	Ambala Cantonment	None	Ambala	Ambala	204,314
5	Ambala City	None	Ambala	Ambala	260,716
6	Mulana	SC	Ambala	Ambala	224,831
7	Sadhaura	SC	Yamunanagar	Ambala	221,373
8	Jagadhri	None	Yamunanagar	Ambala	232,785
9	Yamunanagar	None	Yamunanagar	Ambala	241,610
10	Radaur	None	Yamunanagar	Kurukshetra	208,790
11	Ladwa	None	Kurukshetra	Kurukshetra	196,614
12	Shahbad	SC	Kurukshetra	Kurukshetra	171,638
13	Thanesar	None	Kurukshetra	Kurukshetra	217,381
14	Pehowa	None	Kurukshetra	Kurukshetra	186,967
15	Guhla	SC	Kaithal	Kurukshetra	192,126
16	Kalayat	None	Kaithal	Kurukshetra	214,407
17	Kaithal	None	Kaithal	Kurukshetra	221,883
18	Pundri	None	Kaithal	Kurukshetra	192,369
19	Nilokheri	SC	Karnal	Karnal	233,546
20	Indri	None	Karnal	Karnal	218,617
21	Karnal	None	Karnal	Karnal	265,466
22	Gharaunda	None	Karnal	Karnal	241,583
23	Assandh	None	Karnal	Karnal	242,795
24	Panipat Rural	None	Panipat	Karnal	285,756
25	Panipat City	None	Panipat	Karnal	230,265
26	Israna	SC	Panipat	Karnal	183,775
27	Samalkha	None	Panipat	Karnal	229,082
28	Ganaur	None	Sonipat	Sonipat	194,417
29	Rai	None	Sonipat	Sonipat	199,340
30	Kharkhauda	SC	Sonipat	Sonipat	177,712
31	Sonipat	None	Sonipat	Sonipat	250,225
32	Gohana	None	Sonipat	Sonipat	195,623
33	Baroda	None	Sonipat	Sonipat	190,126
34	Julana	None	Jind	Sonipat	185,565
35	Safidon	None	Jind	Sonipat	195,650
36	Jind	None	Jind	Sonipat	203,349
37	Uchana Kalan	None	Jind	Hisar	218,373
38	Narwana	SC	Jind	Sirsa	224,251
39	Tohana	None	Fatehabad	Sirsa	231,156
40	Fatehabad	None	Fatehabad	Sirsa	258,415
41	Ratia	SC	Fatehabad	Sirsa	227,040
42	Kalanwali	SC	Sirsa	Sirsa	184,398
43	Dabwali	None	Sirsa	Sirsa	207,272
44	Rania	None	Sirsa	Sirsa	189,033
45	Sirsa	None	Sirsa	Sirsa	230,157
46	Ellenabad	None	Sirsa	Sirsa	195,308
47	Adampur	None	Hisar	Hisar	178,492
48	Uklana	SC	Hisar	Hisar	216,019
49	Narnaund	None	Hisar	Hisar	215,286
50	Hansi	None	Hisar	Hisar	203,799
51	Barwala	None	Hisar	Hisar	188,802
52	Hisar	None	Hisar	Hisar	180,819
53	Nalwa	None	Hisar	Hisar	180,098
54	Loharu	None	Bhiwani	Bhiwani–Mahendragarh	201,143
55	Badhra	None	Charkhi Dadri	Bhiwani–Mahendragarh	211,267
56	Dadri	None	Charkhi Dadri	Bhiwani–Mahendragarh	207,178
57	Bhiwani	None	Bhiwani	Bhiwani–Mahendragarh	236,980
58	Tosham	None	Bhiwani	Bhiwani–Mahendragarh	222,757
59	Bawani Khera	SC	Bhiwani	Hisar	217,262
60	Meham	None	Rohtak	Rohtak	200,698
61	Garhi Sampla-Kiloi	None	Rohtak	Rohtak	222,273
62	Rohtak	None	Rohtak	Rohtak	198,237
63	Kalanaur	SC	Rohtak	Rohtak	217,185
64	Bahadurgarh	None	Jhajjar	Rohtak	243,180
65	Badli	None	Jhajjar	Rohtak	189,162
66	Jhajjar	SC	Jhajjar	Rohtak	192,758
67	Beri	None	Jhajjar	Rohtak	185,556
68	Ateli	None	Mahendragarh	Bhiwani–Mahendragarh	206,475
69	Mahendragarh	None	Mahendragarh	Bhiwani–Mahendragarh	213,494
70	Narnaul	None	Mahendragarh	Bhiwani–Mahendragarh	157,990
71	Nangal Chaudhry	None	Mahendragarh	Bhiwani–Mahendragarh	168,244
72	Bawal	SC	Rewari	Gurgaon	231,756
73	Kosli	None	Rewari	Rohtak	254,470
74	Rewari	None	Rewari	Gurgaon	253,367
75	Pataudi	SC	Gurgaon	Gurgaon	256,786
76	Badshahpur	None	Gurgaon	Gurgaon	513,878
77	Gurgaon	None	Gurgaon	Gurgaon	437,674
78	Sohna	None	Gurgaon	Gurgaon	284,731
79	Nuh	None	Nuh	Gurgaon	206,801
80	Ferozepur Jhirka	None	Nuh	Gurgaon	245,916
81	Punahana	None	Nuh	Gurgaon	204,686
82	Hathin	None	Palwal	Faridabad	240,570
83	Hodal	SC	Palwal	Faridabad	197,043
84	Palwal	None	Palwal	Faridabad	267,868
85	Prithla	None	Faridabad	Faridabad	225,354
86	Faridabad NIT	None	Faridabad	Faridabad	317,514
87	Badkhal	None	Faridabad	Faridabad	329,878
88	Ballabgarh	None	Faridabad	Faridabad	272,434
89	Faridabad	None	Faridabad	Faridabad	264,037
90	Tigaon	None	Faridabad	Faridabad	371,248

== See also ==
- List of Lok Sabha constituencies in Haryana
- List of constituencies of the Punjab Legislative Assembly
