= Ishwar Singh =

Ishwar Singh may refer to:

- Ishwar Singh (politician, born 1950), Indian politician, Rajya Sabha member from Haryana
- Ishwar Singh (politician, born 1926) (1926–1998), Indian politician, leader of the Congress Party and speaker of Haryana Vidhan Sabha

== See also ==
- Ishwari Singh, ruler of the Indian princely state of Bundi from 1927–1945
- Ishwari Singh of Jaipur, Maharaja of Jaipur (ruler of the Indian princely state)
