= Harmohinder Singh Chatha =

Indian politician

Speaker of Haryana Legislative Assembly
- In office 28 October 2009 – 28 January 2011
- Preceded by: Raghuvir Singh Kadian
- Succeeded by: Kuldeep Sharma
- In office 21 March 2005 – 12 January 2006
- Preceded by: Satbir Singh Kadian
- Succeeded by: Raghuvir Singh Kadian
- In office 9 July 1987 – 9 July 1991
- Preceded by: Sardar Tara Singh
- Succeeded by: Ishwar Singh

Personal details
- Party: Indian National Congress

Harmohinder Singh Chatha is an Indian politician who served as Speaker of the Haryana Legislative Assembly and Minister for Finance, Agriculture, Horticulture, Animal Husbandry, Dairy and Fisheries in the Government of Haryana.

== Personal life ==
Chatha was born on 1 April 1935, in Phalia. He got degrees in B.A. and LL.B. from Dyal Singh College, Karnal.

== Career ==
On 11 October 1972, he resigned from membership in the community, and Chaudhri Sarup Singh succeeded him as Minister of State. On 28 October 2009, he was appointed speaker of the assembly.
