= Rohat Assembly constituency =

Constituency of the Haryana legislative assembly in India

Coordinates: 28.93°N 76.97°E

- Former constituency for the Haryana Legislative Assembly

Constituency details
- Country: India
- Region: North India
- State: Haryana
- Established: 1968
- Abolished: 2005
- Total electors: 1,13,983

Rohat Assembly constituency was an assembly constituency in the India state of Haryana.

== Members of the Legislative Assembly ==
Election	Member	Party
1967	B. Singh	Independent politician
1968	Kanwar Singh	Indian National Congress
1972	Phool Chand	Indian National Congress
1977	Om Prakash	Janata Party
1982	Bhim Singh	Lokdal
1987	Mahendra	Lokdal
1991	Hukam Singh	Indian National Congress
1996	Krishana Gahlawat	Haryana Vikas Party
2000	Padam Singh	Indian National Lok Dal
2005	Sukhbir Singh	Nationalist Congress Party

== Election results ==
=== Assembly Election 2005 ===
2005 Haryana Legislative Assembly election: Rohat
Party	Candidate	Votes	%	±%
NCP	Sukhbir Singh	43,246	52.97%	New
INLD	Padam Singh	20,106	24.63%	▼24.21
INC	Krishana Gahlawat	14,060	17.22%	▲8.59
BJP	Nawal Singh	1,623	1.99%	New
BSP	Yashpal Singh	787	0.96%	▲0.07
LJP	Anand Toor	327	0.40%	New
Margin of victory		23,140	28.34%	▲20.66
Turnout		81,640	71.62%	▲3.48
Registered electors		1,13,983		▲6.13
NCP gain from INLD		Swing	▲4.14	

=== Assembly Election 2000 ===
2000 Haryana Legislative Assembly election: Rohat
Party	Candidate	Votes	%	±%
INLD	Padam Singh	35,739	48.83%	New
Independent	Sukhbir Singh	30,114	41.15%	New
INC	Sanjay	6,320	8.64%	▲0.15
BSP	Balbir	657	0.90%	New
Margin of victory		5,625	7.69%	▲4.62
Turnout		73,185	69.06%	▲4.60
Registered electors		1,07,399		▼1.52
INLD gain from HVP		Swing	▲14.49	

=== Assembly Election 1996 ===
1996 Haryana Legislative Assembly election: Rohat
Party	Candidate	Votes	%	±%
HVP	Krishana Gahlawat	23,799	34.34%	▲15.17
SAP	Padam Singh	21,676	31.28%	New
Independent	Sukhbir Singh	10,809	15.60%	New
INC	Rampal Dahiya	5,878	8.48%	▼27.78
Independent	Nathu Ram	3,680	5.31%	New
AIIC(T)	Satbir	792	1.14%	New
Margin of victory		2,123	3.06%	▲2.99
Turnout		69,296	65.56%	▲7.77
Registered electors		1,09,056		▲11.21
HVP gain from INC		Swing	▼1.92	

=== Assembly Election 1991 ===
1991 Haryana Legislative Assembly election: Rohat
Party	Candidate	Votes	%	±%
INC	Hukam Singh	19,834	36.26%	▲8.25
JP	Mohinder Singh	19,796	36.20%	▲31.29
HVP	Nawal Singh	10,484	19.17%	New
Haryana Chhatra Yuva Morcha	Devinder Singh	1,716	3.14%	New
BJP	Ram Dhan	1,499	2.74%	New
Jawan Kisan Mazdur Party	Sube Singh	309	0.56%	New
Independent	Rajinder Singh	306	0.56%	New
Margin of victory		38	0.07%	▼34.28
Turnout		54,692	58.27%	▼10.26
Registered electors		98,059		▲9.49
INC gain from LKD		Swing	▼26.10	

=== Assembly Election 1987 ===
1987 Haryana Legislative Assembly election: Rohat
Party	Candidate	Votes	%	±%
LKD	Mahendra	36,882	62.37%	▲6.20
INC	Rizaq Ram	16,570	28.02%	▼6.84
JP	Bhim Singh	2,899	4.90%	New
Independent	Pyare Lal	1,548	2.62%	New
Independent	Lekh Ram	342	0.58%	New
Independent	Satish S/O Shiv Ram	299	0.51%	New
Margin of victory		20,312	34.35%	▲13.04
Turnout		59,137	66.88%	▼0.72
Registered electors		89,559		▲15.97
LKD hold		Swing	▲6.20	

=== Assembly Election 1982 ===
1982 Haryana Legislative Assembly election: Rohat
Party	Candidate	Votes	%	±%
LKD	Bhim Singh	28,952	56.17%	New
INC	Shanti Devi	17,971	34.86%	▲17.87
Independent	Kanwar Singh	3,037	5.89%	New
Independent	Dalel Singh	679	1.32%	New
Independent	Nathu Ram	324	0.63%	New
Independent	Mahender Kaur	308	0.60%	New
Margin of victory		10,981	21.30%	▼19.36
Turnout		51,548	67.62%	▲5.49
Registered electors		77,224		▲16.59
LKD gain from JP		Swing	▼1.49	

=== Assembly Election 1977 ===
1977 Haryana Legislative Assembly election: Rohat
Party	Candidate	Votes	%	±%
JP	Om Prakash	23,396	57.66%	New
INC	Nawal Singh	6,897	17.00%	▼12.84
Independent	Nathu Ram	3,684	9.08%	New
Independent	Raghbir Singh	3,321	8.18%	New
VHP	Kawar Singh	3,279	8.08%	New
Margin of victory		16,499	40.66%	▲39.16
Turnout		40,577	61.92%	▼2.97
Registered electors		66,237		▲21.82
JP gain from INC(O)		Swing	▲22.58	

=== Assembly Election 1972 ===
1972 Haryana Legislative Assembly election: Rohat
Party	Candidate	Votes	%	±%
INC(O)	Phool Chand	12,249	35.07%	New
Independent	Kanwar Singh	11,726	33.58%	New
INC	Shanti Devi	10,419	29.83%	▼24.04
Independent	Ratan Singh	530	1.52%	New
Margin of victory		523	1.50%	▼6.26
Turnout		34,924	65.81%	▲22.54
Registered electors		54,373		▲8.39
INC(O) gain from INC		Swing	▼18.80	

=== Assembly Election 1968 ===
1968 Haryana Legislative Assembly election: Rohat
Party	Candidate	Votes	%	±%
INC	Kanwar Singh	11,268	53.88%	New
Independent	Phool Chand	9,646	46.12%	New
Margin of victory		1,622	7.76%	
Turnout		20,914	42.59%	
Registered electors		50,166		
INC win (new seat)				
