= Pai Assembly constituency =

Constituency of the Haryana legislative assembly in India

Coordinates: 29.71°N 76.53°E

- Former constituency for the Haryana Legislative Assembly

Constituency details
- Country: India
- Region: North India
- State: Haryana
- Established: 1977
- Abolished: 2005
- Total electors: 1,12,851

Pai Assembly constituency was an assembly constituency in the India state of Haryana.

== Members of the Legislative Assembly ==
Election	Member	Party
1977	Jagjit Singh Pohlu	Vishal Haryana Party
1982	Nar Singh Dhanda	Lokdal
1987	Nar Singh Dhanda	Lokdal
1991	Tejender Pal Singh	Indian National Congress
1996	Ram Pal Majra	Samata Party
2000	Ram Pal Majra	Indian National Lok Dal
2005	Tejender Pal Singh	Independent politician

== Election results ==
=== Assembly Election 2005 ===
2005 Haryana Legislative Assembly election: Pai
Party	Candidate	Votes	%	±%
Independent	Tejender Pal Singh	32,437	35.14%	New
INLD	Ram Pal Majra	25,935	28.10%	▼20.40
INC	Sajjan Singh	25,749	27.90%	▼12.25
BJP	Nar Singh Dhanda	2,618	2.84%	New
BSP	Deepa	1,842	2.00%	▼3.02
BRP	Fauji Hawa Singh Dhull	1,532	1.66%	New
Independent	Ram Pal Majra	1,030	1.12%	New
Independent	Ishwar	721	0.78%	New
Independent	Jagdish	372	0.40%	New
Margin of victory		6,502	7.04%	▼1.31
Turnout		92,305	81.79%	▲8.82
Registered electors		1,12,851		▲4.28
Independent gain from INLD		Swing	▼13.35	

=== Assembly Election 2000 ===
2000 Haryana Legislative Assembly election: Pai
Party	Candidate	Votes	%	±%
INLD	Ram Pal Majra	38,296	48.49%	New
INC	Tejender Pal Singh	31,700	40.14%	▲20.71
HVP	Nar Singh Dhanda	4,353	5.51%	▼23.13
BSP	Bhagwan Singh	3,957	5.01%	▼7.81
Margin of victory		6,596	8.35%	▲5.39
Turnout		78,970	73.91%	▲1.38
Registered electors		1,08,223		▲0.81
INLD gain from SAP		Swing	▲16.89	

=== Assembly Election 1996 ===
1996 Haryana Legislative Assembly election: Pai
Party	Candidate	Votes	%	±%
SAP	Ram Pal Majra	24,291	31.60%	New
HVP	Nar Singh Dhanda	22,016	28.64%	▲7.68
INC	Tejender Pal Singh	14,938	19.44%	▼22.09
BSP	Ram Singh	9,854	12.82%	▲7.76
AIIC(T)	Gurcharan Singh	4,211	5.48%	New
Margin of victory		2,275	2.96%	▼13.88
Turnout		76,861	74.79%	▲3.24
Registered electors		1,07,356		▲13.91
SAP gain from INC		Swing	▼9.92	

=== Assembly Election 1991 ===
1991 Haryana Legislative Assembly election: Pai
Party	Candidate	Votes	%	±%
INC	Tejender Pal Singh	26,752	41.53%	▲18.63
JP	Nar Singh Dhanda	15,904	24.69%	New
HVP	Harphool Singh	13,505	20.96%	New
BSP	Kartara	3,262	5.06%	New
Independent	Sispal	1,644	2.55%	New
Independent	Ram Pal Majra	1,015	1.58%	New
Independent	Nafe Singh	729	1.13%	New
BJP	Balbir	493	0.77%	New
Margin of victory		10,848	16.84%	▼29.19
Turnout		64,423	71.25%	▼6.35
Registered electors		94,245		▲9.92
INC gain from LKD		Swing	▼27.40	

=== Assembly Election 1987 ===
1987 Haryana Legislative Assembly election: Pai
Party	Candidate	Votes	%	±%
LKD	Nar Singh Dhanda	44,151	68.93%	▲23.32
INC	Harphul Singh	14,668	22.90%	▼14.20
Independent	Bhale Ram	4,307	6.72%	New
Independent	Shiv Kumar	427	0.67%	New
Margin of victory		29,483	46.03%	▲37.52
Turnout		64,053	75.60%	▲1.20
Registered electors		85,736		▲15.83
LKD hold		Swing	▲23.32	

=== Assembly Election 1982 ===
1982 Haryana Legislative Assembly election: Pai
Party	Candidate	Votes	%	±%
LKD	Nar Singh Dhanda	24,816	45.61%	New
INC	Tejender Pal Singh	20,188	37.10%	▲31.43
Independent	Jagjit Singh Pohlu	3,948	7.26%	New
Independent	Ram Chander	3,740	6.87%	New
JP	Ram Pal Majra	884	1.62%	▼33.61
Margin of victory		4,628	8.51%	▼2.12
Turnout		54,414	74.64%	▲9.87
Registered electors		74,021		▲20.05
LKD gain from VHP		Swing	▼0.26	

=== Assembly Election 1977 ===
1977 Haryana Legislative Assembly election: Pai
Party	Candidate	Votes	%	±%
VHP	Jagjit Singh Pohlu	17,997	45.86%	New
JP	Kushal Pal Singh	13,827	35.24%	New
Independent	Chatarbhuj	4,283	10.91%	New
INC	Shankar Lal	2,224	5.67%	New
Independent	Randhir Singh	909	2.32%	New
Margin of victory		4,170	10.63%	
Turnout		39,240	64.50%	
Registered electors		61,656		
VHP win (new seat)				
