= Mundhal Khurd Assembly constituency =

Constituency of the Haryana legislative assembly in India

Coordinates: 28.980°N 76.195°E

- Former constituency for the Haryana Legislative Assembly

Constituency details
- Country: India
- Region: North India
- State: Haryana
- District: Bhiwani
- Established: 1967
- Abolished: 2005
- Total electors: 1,26,496

Mundhal Khurd Assembly constituency was an assembly constituency in the India state of Haryana.

== Members of the Legislative Assembly ==
Election	Member	Party
1967	J. Singh	Independent politician
1968	Swaroop Singh	Indian National Congress
1972	Swaroop Singh	Indian National Congress
1977	Tek Ram	Janata Party
1982	Balbir Singh	Lokdal
1987	Vasudev	Lokdal
1991	Chhatar Singh Chauhan	Haryana Vikas Party
1996	Chhatar Singh Chauhan	Haryana Vikas Party
2000	Shashi Ranjan Panwar	Indian National Lok Dal
2005	Ranbir Singh Mahendra	Indian National Congress

== Election results ==
=== Assembly election 2005 ===
2005 Haryana Legislative Assembly election: Mundhal Khurd
Party	Candidate	Votes	%	±%
INC	Ranbir Singh Mahendra	42,587	45.67%	▲14.15
INLD	Raghvir Singh	31,001	33.24%	▼13.03
BJP	Om Prakash Mann	13,723	14.71%	New
BSP	Anoop	2,496	2.68%	▼7.42
LJP	Karambir Ranga	623	0.67%	New
Independent	Jagdish	514	0.55%	New
BRP	Kaptan	493	0.53%	New
Margin of victory		11,586	12.42%	▼2.33
Turnout		93,259	73.72%	▲4.40
Registered electors		1,26,496		▲15.08
INC gain from INLD		Swing	▼0.60	

=== Assembly election 2000 ===
2000 Haryana Legislative Assembly election: Mundhal Khurd
Party	Candidate	Votes	%	±%
INLD	Shashi Ranjan Panwar	35,260	46.27%	New
INC	Ranbir Singh Mahendra	24,017	31.52%	▲4.78
BSP	Nirmala Devi	7,693	10.09%	▲4.81
HVP	Chhatar Singh Chauhan	7,191	9.44%	▼38.06
SP	Raghbir Singh	1,145	1.50%	▼0.20
Independent	Mahabir Singh	607	0.80%	New
Margin of victory		11,243	14.75%	▼6.01
Turnout		76,207	70.04%	▲5.67
Registered electors		1,09,920		▼1.64
INLD gain from HVP		Swing	▼1.23	

=== Assembly election 1996 ===
1996 Haryana Legislative Assembly election: Mundhal Khurd
Party	Candidate	Votes	%	±%
HVP	Chhatar Singh Chauhan	33,788	47.50%	▲1.22
INC	Shashi Ranjan	19,017	26.73%	▼2.45
SAP	Jagat Singh	8,772	12.33%	New
BSP	Phool Bai	3,756	5.28%	New
AIIC(T)	Biraj Devi	2,079	2.92%	New
SP	Balbir Singh	1,214	1.71%	New
Margin of victory		14,771	20.76%	▲3.67
Turnout		71,138	65.38%	▲5.00
Registered electors		1,11,756		▲12.48
HVP hold		Swing	▲1.22	

=== Assembly election 1991 ===
1991 Haryana Legislative Assembly election: Mundhal Khurd
Party	Candidate	Votes	%	±%
HVP	Chhatar Singh Chauhan	26,965	46.28%	New
INC	Bir Singh	17,006	29.18%	▲3.39
JP	Siri Kishan	9,791	16.80%	New
BJP	Risihi Ram	1,829	3.14%	New
Independent	Dushyant	1,164	2.00%	New
Margin of victory		9,959	17.09%	▲3.31
Turnout		58,271	60.35%	▼7.00
Registered electors		99,353		▲10.58
HVP gain from LKD		Swing	▲6.70	

=== Assembly election 1987 ===
1987 Haryana Legislative Assembly election: Mundhal Khurd
Party	Candidate	Votes	%	±%
LKD	Vasudev	23,342	39.57%	▼4.92
INC	Chhatar Singh Chauhan	15,216	25.80%	▼15.57
Independent	Bir Singh	11,970	20.29%	New
Independent	Narain	3,011	5.10%	New
Independent	Suresh Rohila	1,529	2.59%	New
VHP	Balbir Singh	1,475	2.50%	New
Independent	Om Parkash	1,270	2.15%	New
Margin of victory		8,126	13.78%	▲10.65
Turnout		58,982	68.00%	▼7.33
Registered electors		89,848		▲16.61
LKD hold		Swing	▼4.92	

=== Assembly election 1982 ===
1982 Haryana Legislative Assembly election: Mundhal Khurd
Party	Candidate	Votes	%	±%
LKD	Balbir Singh	25,019	44.50%	New
INC	Bir Singh	23,261	41.37%	▲22.82
Independent	Ram Autar	5,481	9.75%	New
JP	Brijpal Singh	567	1.01%	▼47.89
Independent	Nathu Ram	371	0.66%	New
Independent	Gaja Nand	332	0.59%	New
Margin of victory		1,758	3.13%	▼27.22
Turnout		56,228	74.19%	▲6.86
Registered electors		77,050		▲22.69
LKD gain from JP		Swing	▼4.40	

=== Assembly election 1977 ===
1977 Haryana Legislative Assembly election: Mundhal Khurd
Party	Candidate	Votes	%	±%
JP	Tek Ram	20,302	48.90%	New
INC	Devi Parsan	7,703	18.55%	▼16.59
Independent	Brij Lal	5,092	12.26%	New
Independent	Bhalleram	1,886	4.54%	New
Independent	Ram Avtar	1,877	4.52%	New
Independent	Dariya	832	2.00%	New
Independent	Mangal Singh	753	1.81%	New
Independent	Nasib Singh	588	1.42%	New
Independent	Magej Singh	520	1.25%	New
Independent	Dalip Singh	506	1.22%	New
Independent	Ram Chander	455	1.10%	New
Margin of victory		12,599	30.34%	▲24.48
Turnout		41,520	67.07%	▼9.59
Registered electors		62,802		▲14.35
JP gain from INC		Swing	▲13.76	

=== Assembly election 1972 ===
1972 Haryana Legislative Assembly election: Mundhal Khurd
Party	Candidate	Votes	%	±%
INC	Swaroop Singh	14,610	35.14%	▼3.28
VHP	Jaswant Singh	12,172	29.28%	New
Independent	Niha Singh	10,852	26.10%	New
Independent	Kulbir Singh	3,391	8.16%	New
Independent	Hawa Singh	552	1.33%	New
Margin of victory		2,438	5.86%	▲1.26
Turnout		41,577	77.45%	▲16.07
Registered electors		54,922		▲5.93
INC hold		Swing	▼3.28	

=== Assembly election 1968 ===
1968 Haryana Legislative Assembly election: Mundhal Khurd
Party	Candidate	Votes	%	±%
INC	Swaroop Singh	11,878	38.42%	▲9.80
SWA	Jaswant Singh	10,456	33.82%	New
ABJS	Dina Nath	7,440	24.06%	New
RPI	Mani Ram	639	2.07%	New
Independent	Jage Ram	391	1.26%	New
Margin of victory		1,422	4.60%	▲1.22
Turnout		30,918	60.92%	▼11.46
Registered electors		51,846		▲5.66
INC gain from Independent		Swing	▲6.42	

=== Assembly election 1967 ===
1967 Haryana Legislative Assembly election: Mundhal Khurd
Party	Candidate	Votes	%	±%
Independent	J. Singh	11,163	32.00%	New
INC	S. Singh	9,985	28.62%	New
Independent	D. Singh	5,013	14.37%	New
SSP	R. Singh	3,048	8.74%	New
Independent	S. Ram	2,794	8.01%	New
Independent	K. Singh	1,118	3.20%	New
Independent	S. Singh	639	1.83%	New
Independent	B. Lal	526	1.51%	New
Independent	D. Chand	427	1.22%	New
Margin of victory		1,178	3.38%	
Turnout		34,885	74.95%	
Registered electors		49,067		
Independent win (new seat)				
