= Hassangarh Assembly constituency =

Constituency of the Haryana legislative assembly in India

Coordinates: 28.84°N 76.85°E

- Former constituency for the Haryana Legislative Assembly

Constituency details
- Country: India
- Region: North India
- State: Haryana
- Established: 1967
- Abolished: 2005
- Total electors: 1,10,742

Hassangarh Assembly constituency was an assembly constituency in the Indian state of Haryana.

== Members of the Legislative Assembly ==
Election	Member	Party
1967	S. Chand	Indian National Congress
1968	Maru Singh	Indian National Congress
1972	Maru Singh	Indian National Congress
1977	Sant Kumar	Janata Party
1982	Bananti Devi	Lokdal
1987	Om Parkahs Bhardwaj	Lokdal
1991	Balwant Singh	Janata Party
1996	Balwant Singh	Samata Party
2000	Balwant Singh	Indian National Lok Dal
2005	Naresh Kumar	Bharatiya Janata Party

== Election results ==
=== Assembly Election 2005 ===
2005 Haryana Legislative Assembly election: Hassangarh
Party	Candidate	Votes	%	±%
BJP	Naresh Kumar	36,328	45.76%	New
INC	Chakrvrty Sharma	26,230	33.04%	▲3.60
INLD	Balwant Singh	14,288	18.00%	▼16.62
Independent	Surender	594	0.75%	New
RLD	Ramesh	370	0.47%	New
BSP	Rajender	358	0.45%	New
Independent	Sukhvir	354	0.45%	New
Margin of victory		10,098	12.72%	▲9.74
Turnout		79,385	71.68%	▲1.28
Registered electors		1,10,742		▲17.64
BJP gain from INLD		Swing	▲11.14	

=== Assembly Election 2000 ===
2000 Haryana Legislative Assembly election: Hassangarh
Party	Candidate	Votes	%	±%
INLD	Balwant Singh	22,943	34.62%	New
Independent	Naresh Kumar Malik	20,967	31.64%	New
INC	Virender Kumar	19,512	29.44%	▲15.63
Independent	Nafe Singh	999	1.51%	New
Independent	Ramesh	663	1.00%	New
NCP	Saroj	522	0.79%	New
HVP	Bimla Devi	349	0.53%	▼16.80
Margin of victory		1,976	2.98%	▼6.10
Turnout		66,271	70.43%	▲8.55
Registered electors		94,135		▼1.07
INLD gain from SAP		Swing	▼0.14	

=== Assembly Election 1996 ===
1996 Haryana Legislative Assembly election: Hassangarh
Party	Candidate	Votes	%	±%
SAP	Balwant Singh	20,454	34.75%	New
AIIC(T)	Veerendra Kumar	15,108	25.67%	New
HVP	Basanti Devi	10,200	17.33%	▲11.45
INC	Rambhaj	8,129	13.81%	▼26.78
Independent	Rajendra	2,097	3.56%	New
Independent	Ranbir	974	1.65%	New
Independent	Satlok	871	1.48%	New
Independent	Jagphool	310	0.53%	New
Margin of victory		5,346	9.08%	▲0.60
Turnout		58,852	64.73%	▲1.41
Registered electors		95,152		▲1.06
SAP gain from JP		Swing	▼14.32	

=== Assembly Election 1991 ===
1991 Haryana Legislative Assembly election: Hassangarh
Party	Candidate	Votes	%	±%
JP	Balwant Singh	27,929	49.08%	New
INC	Virendra Kumar	23,100	40.59%	▲17.69
HVP	Sant Kumar	3,346	5.88%	New
Independent	Shri Bhagwan	1,028	1.81%	New
BJP	Ravi Chand Sindhu	481	0.85%	New
Margin of victory		4,829	8.49%	▼33.53
Turnout		56,909	62.39%	▼4.75
Registered electors		94,154		▲10.57
JP gain from LKD		Swing	▼15.85	

=== Assembly Election 1987 ===
1987 Haryana Legislative Assembly election: Hassangarh
Party	Candidate	Votes	%	±%
LKD	Om Parkahs Bhardwaj	36,041	64.92%	▲4.15
INC	Jai Kiran	12,716	22.91%	▼10.51
Independent	Zile Singh	2,557	4.61%	New
VHP	Basanti Devi	2,417	4.35%	New
Independent	Bhale Ram	374	0.67%	New
Independent	Rajender Singh Kataria	362	0.65%	New
Independent	Jagdish Khanakwal	315	0.57%	New
Margin of victory		23,325	42.02%	▲14.65
Turnout		55,514	66.97%	▼2.23
Registered electors		85,154		▲15.00
LKD hold		Swing	▲4.15	

=== Assembly Election 1982 ===
1982 Haryana Legislative Assembly election: Hassangarh
Party	Candidate	Votes	%	±%
LKD	Bananti Devi	30,344	60.78%	New
INC	Anand	16,683	33.41%	▲19.35
Independent	Raj Singh	821	1.64%	New
Independent	Jagdish	697	1.40%	New
Independent	Ranbir	535	1.07%	New
JP	Shyam Kumar	510	1.02%	▼49.67
Margin of victory		13,661	27.36%	▲6.86
Turnout		49,927	68.57%	▲7.70
Registered electors		74,048		▲16.83
LKD gain from JP		Swing	▲10.08	

=== Assembly Election 1977 ===
1977 Haryana Legislative Assembly election: Hassangarh
Party	Candidate	Votes	%	±%
JP	Sant Kumar	19,191	50.69%	New
VHP	Sheonath	11,429	30.19%	New
INC	Maru Singh	5,323	14.06%	▼19.03
Independent	Kapur Singh	1,221	3.23%	New
Independent	Jugti Ram	693	1.83%	New
Margin of victory		7,762	20.50%	▲14.76
Turnout		37,857	60.26%	▼5.56
Registered electors		63,383		▲12.37
JP gain from INC		Swing	▲17.61	

=== Assembly Election 1972 ===
1972 Haryana Legislative Assembly election: Hassangarh
Party	Candidate	Votes	%	±%
INC	Maru Singh	12,185	33.09%	▼19.58
Independent	Raghbir Singh	10,069	27.34%	New
INC(O)	Ram Chander	7,608	20.66%	New
Independent	Harnarain Singh	4,093	11.11%	New
Independent	Raghbir Singh	2,872	7.80%	New
Margin of victory		2,116	5.75%	▼27.70
Turnout		36,827	66.55%	▲13.53
Registered electors		56,404		▲6.97
INC hold		Swing	▼19.58	

=== Assembly Election 1968 ===
1968 Haryana Legislative Assembly election: Hassangarh
Party	Candidate	Votes	%	±%
INC	Maru Singh	14,372	52.66%	▲21.26
Independent	Raghbir Singh	5,244	19.22%	New
Independent	Kali Ram	3,754	13.76%	New
SWA	Nafe Singh	2,857	10.47%	New
ABJS	Duli Chand	491	1.80%	New
Independent	Siri Krishan	317	1.16%	New
VHP	Sada Ram	255	0.93%	New
Margin of victory		9,128	33.45%	▲27.52
Turnout		27,290	52.67%	▼18.32
Registered electors		52,727		▲3.90
INC hold		Swing	▲21.26	

=== Assembly Election 1967 ===
1967 Haryana Legislative Assembly election: Hassangarh
Party	Candidate	Votes	%	±%
INC	S. Chand	11,167	31.40%	New
Independent	H. Singh	9,058	25.47%	New
Independent	J. Singh	8,041	22.61%	New
SSP	B. Singh	5,123	14.41%	New
CPI	D. Singh	1,547	4.35%	New
Independent	M. Ram	627	1.76%	New
Margin of victory		2,109	5.93%	
Turnout		35,563	72.84%	
Registered electors		50,746		
INC win (new seat)				
