= 2000 Haryana Legislative Assembly election =

Legislative assembly election in Haryana, India

- 22 February 2000

All 90 seats to the Haryana Legislative Assembly 46 seats needed for a majority
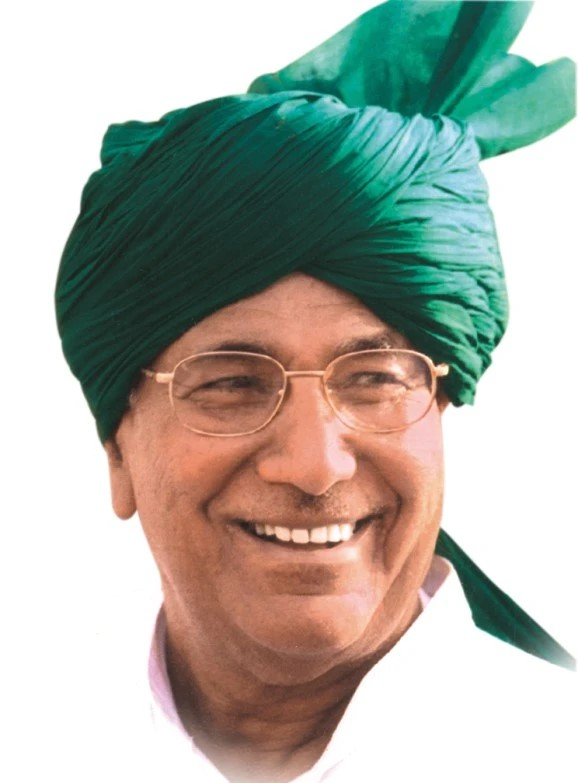

	First party	Second party
Leader	Om Prakash Chautala	Bhajan Lal Bishnoi
Party	INLD	INC
Leader since	24 July 1999	1982
Leader's seat	Rori	Adampur
Last election	New	9
Seats won	47	21
Seat change	New	▲12
Percentage	29.61%	31.22%
Chief Minister before election
Om Prakash Chautala
INLD
Elected Chief Minister
Om Prakash Chautala
INLD

The 2000 Haryana Legislative Assembly election was held on 22 February 2000, to elect all 90 members of the Haryana Legislative Assembly. Results were declared on 25 February 2000. Indian National Lok Dal won 47 seats and formed the government.

== Parties and alliances ==
Party/Alliance Name		Flag	Electoral symbol	Leader	Seats contested
NDA	Indian National Lok Dal			Om Prakash Chautala	62
NDA	Bharatiya Janata Party			Ramesh Joshi	28
Indian National Congress				Bhajan Lal Bishnoi	90
Haryana Vikas Party				Bansi Lal	82

== Results ==
The results were declared on 25 February 2000.

Party	Candidates	Seats Won	Vote %
Indian National Lok Dal	62	47	29.61
Indian National Congress	90	21	31.22
Bharatiya Janata Party	29	6	8.94
Bahujan Samaj Party	83	1	5.74
Nationalist Congress Party	24	1	0.51
Haryana Vikas Party	82	2	5.55
Republican Party of India	5	1	0.62
Independent	519	11	16.90
Total		90	

== Elected members ==
Winner, runner-up, voter turnout, and victory margin in every constituency
Assembly Constituency		Turnout	Winner				Runner Up				Margin
#k	Names	%	Candidate	Party	Votes	%	Candidate	Party	Votes	%	Margin
1	Kalka	59.22	Chander Mohan	INC	61,581	51.68	Sham Lal	BJP	46,738	39.22	14,843
2	Naraingarh	76.10	Pawan Kumar	INLD	32,092	38.47	Lal Singh	INC	24,659	29.56	7,433
3	Sadhaura	78.08	Balwant Singh	INLD	30,106	32.10	Deep Chand	INC	22,628	24.12	7,478
4	Chhachhrauli	87.02	Kanwar Pal	BJP	31,948	34.89	Akram Khan	IND	28,527	31.16	3,421
5	Yamunanagar	59.65	Dr. Jai Parkash Shrama	INC	20,742	23.75	Kamla Verma	BJP	17,978	20.58	2,764
6	Jagadhri	75.04	Dr. Bishan Lal Saini	BSP	25,952	29.13	Rameshwar Chouhan	BJP	22,670	25.44	3,282
7	Mulana	71.59	Risal Singh	INLD	40,682	47.05	Phool Chand Mullana	INC	35,560	41.12	5,122
8	Ambala Cantt.	63.13	Anil Vij	IND	25,045	45.57	Kabir Dev	BJP	15,988	29.09	9,057
9	Ambala City	60.58	Veena Chhibber	BJP	29,949	42.84	Kiran Bala	INC	23,840	34.11	6,109
10	Naggal	78.24	Jasbir Mallour	INLD	53,884	57.40	Nirmal Singh S/O Hazara Singh	INC	35,111	37.40	18,773
11	Indri	75.98	Bhim Sain	IND	31,767	32.84	Bal Krishan	INLD	30,924	31.97	843
12	Nilokheri	73.28	Dharm Pal	INLD	43,326	51.40	Jai Singh	INC	34,072	40.42	9,254
13	Karnal	59.69	Jai Parkash	IND	31,495	37.41	Satish Kalra	BJP	27,762	32.98	3,733
14	Jundla	61.94	Naphe Singh	INLD	40,868	56.78	Raj Kumar	INC	22,013	30.58	18,855
15	Gharaunda	71.34	Ramesh Rana	INLD	43,479	51.35	Jai Pal Sharma	IND	20,009	23.63	23,470
16	Assandh	64.85	Krishan Lal	INLD	44,392	57.96	Raj Rani	INC	21,150	27.61	23,242
17	Panipat	60.41	Balbir Paul	INC	43,514	41.16	Manohar Lal	BJP	29,305	27.72	14,209
18	Samalkha	71.79	Kartar Singh Bhadana	INLD	37,174	42.42	Hari Singh Nalwa	INC	25,159	28.71	12,015
19	Naultha	72.93	Satbir Singh Kadiyan	INLD	44,882	54.46	Ranjeet	BSP	19,401	23.54	25,481
20	Shahbad	69.78	Kapoor Chand	BJP	28,490	37.77	Tara Singh	INC	24,496	32.47	3,994
21	Radaur	76.58	Banta Ram	INLD	38,551	47.72	Ram Singh	INC	31,996	39.60	6,555
22	Thanesar	69.52	Ashok Kumar	INLD	44,678	48.64	Shashi Saini	INC	30,877	33.62	13,801
23	Pehowa	73.58	Jaswinder Singh	INLD	36,031	41.12	Balbir Singh Saini	IND	21,940	25.04	14,091
24	Guhla	69.74	Amar Singh	INLD	51,402	56.55	Dilu Ram	INC	36,428	40.08	14,974
25	Kaithal	71.65	Leela Ram	INLD	35,440	42.28	Dharam Pal S/O Didara	IND	17,483	20.86	17,957
26	Pundri	76.99	Tejvir Singh	IND	21,559	24.44	Narinder S/O Thaukar Dass	IND	19,790	22.44	1,769
27	Pai	73.91	Ram Pal Majra	INLD	38,296	48.49	Tejender Pal Singh	INC	31,700	40.14	6,596
28	Hassangarh	70.43	Balwant Singh	INLD	22,943	34.62	Naresh Kumar Malik	IND	20,967	31.64	1,976
29	Kiloi	70.75	Bhupinder Singh Hooda	INC	39,513	53.48	Dharam Pal	INLD	27,555	37.30	11,958
30	Rohtak	59.68	Shadi Lal Batra	INC	36,494	47.63	Munish	BJP	32,830	42.85	3,664
31	Meham	77.68	Balbir	INLD	38,167	45.42	Anand Singh	INC	33,821	40.25	4,346
32	Kalanaur	64.36	Sarita Narian	BJP	26,498	45.63	Kartar Devi	INC	23,981	41.29	2,517
33	Beri	70.33	Dr. Raghuvir Singh Kadian	INC	34,504	49.87	Dr.Virender Pal	INLD	27,896	40.32	6,608
34	Salhawas	70.82	Anita Yadav	INC	40,893	53.44	Hukam Singh	INLD	28,151	36.79	12,742
35	Jhajjar	56.24	Dariyav Khatik	IND	25,052	38.50	Phul Chand	INC	14,142	21.73	10,910
36	Badli, Haryana	67.68	Dheer Pal Singh	INLD	31,694	48.11	Naresh Kumar	INC	21,968	33.35	9,726
37	Bahadurgarh	61.31	Nafe Singh Rathee	INLD	38,582	49.11	Ramesh Singh	INC	36,915	46.99	1,667
38	Baroda	69.79	Ramesh Kumar	INLD	35,966	52.14	Shyam Chand	INC	23,946	34.71	12,020
39	Gohana	68.52	Ram Kuwar	INLD	23,059	29.21	Jagbir Singh Malik	HVP	13,601	17.23	9,458
40	Kailana	72.02	Jitender Singh	INC	35,653	42.79	Ved Singh	INLD	34,913	41.90	740
41	Sonipat	58.78	Dev Raj Diwan	IND	30,341	35.76	Devi Dass	BJP	26,856	31.65	3,485
42	Rai	66.64	Suraj Mal	INLD	35,381	44.74	Satpal	INC	29,526	37.33	5,855
43	Rohat	69.06	Padam Singh	INLD	35,739	48.83	Sukhbir Singh	IND	30,114	41.15	5,625
44	Kalayat	68.84	Deena Ram	INLD	28,370	40.54	Baldev Singh	INC	17,823	25.47	10,547
45	Narwana	78.00	Om Parkash Chautala	INLD	41,923	48.14	Randeep Singh	INC	39,729	45.62	2,194
46	Uchana Kalan	77.81	Bhag Singh	INLD	39,715	44.98	Birender Singh	INC	32,773	37.12	6,942
47	Rajound	70.68	Ram Kumar	INLD	24,415	35.61	Satvinder Singh	INC	15,726	22.94	8,689
48	Jind	69.88	Mange Ram Gupta	INC	41,621	44.22	Gulshan Lal	INLD	36,978	39.29	4,643
49	Julana	73.65	Sher Singh	INC	34,657	44.98	Suraj Bhan Kajal	INLD	32,556	42.25	2,101
50	Safidon	74.40	Ram Phal	INLD	45,382	52.93	Bachan Singh	INC	37,004	43.16	8,378
51	Faridabad	51.37	Chander Bhatia	BJP	56,008	50.02	Akagar Chand Chaudhry	INC	38,002	33.94	18,006
52	Mewla–Maharajpur	51.14	Krishan Pal	BJP	50,912	39.29	Mahender Pratap	BSP	50,751	39.17	161
53	Ballabgarh	57.86	Rajinder Singh Bisla	IND	38,112	38.16	Ram Bilas Sharma	BJP	30,040	30.08	8,072
54	Palwal	74.18	Karan Singh Dalal	RPI	37,539	43.35	Devender Chauhan	INLD	24,487	28.27	13,052
55	Hassanpur	67.72	Udai Bhan	IND	37,390	48.87	Jagdish Nayar	INLD	32,535	42.52	4,855
56	Hathin	77.51	Bhagwan Sahai Rawat	INLD	23,777	29.46	Harsh Kumar	HVP	22,423	27.78	1,354
57	Ferozepur Jhirka	70.41	Chaudhary Mohammad Ilyas	INLD	44,288	50.32	Shakrulla Khan	INC	26,728	30.37	17,560
58	Nuh	71.42	Hamid Hussain	INLD	31,454	40.08	Chaudhary Khurshid Ahmed	INC	22,020	28.06	9,434
59	Taoru	73.12	Zakir Hussain	INC	45,126	49.82	Suraj Pal Singh	BJP	34,916	38.55	10,210
60	Sohna	69.76	Dharam Pal	INC	32,645	37.23	Sukhbir Singh	IND	21,071	24.03	11,574
61	Gurgaon	55.98	Gopi Chand	IND	40,493	37.94	Dharambir	INC	25,181	23.59	15,312
62	Pataudi	66.02	Ram Bir Singh	INLD	42,127	52.91	Kirpa Ram Punia	INC	33,188	41.68	8,939
63	Badhra	73.71	Ranbir Singh	INLD	25,205	29.55	Narpender Singh	HVP	18,415	21.59	6,790
64	Dadri	69.90	Jagjit Singh	NCP	23,943	30.43	Shakuntla	INLD	23,166	29.44	777
65	Mundhal Khurd	70.04	Shashi Ranjan Panwar	INLD	35,260	46.27	Ranbir Singh Mahendra	INC	24,017	31.52	11,243
66	Bhiwani	61.94	Bansi Lal	HVP	33,199	46.39	Vasudev Sharma	INC	25,130	35.11	8,069
67	Tosham	76.74	Dharambir	INC	49,132	52.24	Surender Singh	HVP	28,335	30.13	20,797
68	Loharu	70.71	Bahadur Singh	INLD	41,439	46.60	Somvir Singh	HVP	35,740	40.19	5,699
69	Bawani Khera	70.78	Ramkishan	HVP	35,410	43.66	Jagannath	INC	22,134	27.29	13,276
70	Barwala	76.03	Jai Prakash	INC	37,486	41.67	Parmila Barwala	INLD	31,618	35.15	5,868
71	Narnaund	76.53	Ram Bhagat S/O Dhan Singh	IND	31,786	41.03	Virender Singh S/O Diwan	INC	29,013	37.45	2,773
72	Hansi	74.11	Subhash Chand	INLD	22,435	25.87	Amir Chand	IND	16,728	19.29	5,707
73	Bhattu Kalan	81.38	Sampat Singh	INLD	48,823	55.27	Jagdish Nehra	INC	33,218	37.60	15,605
74	Hisar	65.17	Om Parkash Jindal	INC	39,017	41.34	Hari Singh Saini	IND	26,128	27.68	12,889
75	Ghirai	79.31	Puran Singh	INLD	42,491	49.19	Prof. Chhattar Pal Singh	INC	37,821	43.78	4,670
76	Tohana	75.80	Nishan Singh	INLD	43,076	45.23	Harpal Singh S/O Nand Lal	INC	37,196	39.06	5,880
77	Ratia	70.77	Jarnail Singh S/O Hakam Singh	INLD	38,224	47.09	Mahabir Parshad	IND	16,169	19.92	22,055
78	Fatehabad	64.23	Lila Krishan	INLD	44,112	49.98	Jai Narain	INC	23,133	26.21	20,979
79	Adampur	73.98	Bhajan Lal	INC	63,174	69.87	Ganeshi Lal	BJP	17,117	18.93	46,057
80	Darba Kalan	81.99	Vidya Devi	INLD	48,438	48.63	Dr. K.V.Singh	INC	26,371	26.48	22,067
81	Ellenabad	72.74	Bhagi Ram	INLD	50,235	54.41	Om Parkash S/O Sheo Chand	INC	35,181	38.10	15,054
82	Sirsa	68.03	Lachhman Dass Arora	INC	40,522	41.67	Jagdish Chopra	BJP	25,431	26.15	15,091
83	Rori	83.04	Om Prakash Chautala	INLD	57,397	60.10	Ranjit Singh S/O Devi Lal	INC	34,791	36.43	22,606
84	Dabwali	70.55	Dr. Sita Ram	INLD	51,672	62.05	Labh Singh	INC	24,679	29.63	26,993
85	Bawal	67.69	Dr. Muni Lal Ranga	INLD	52,524	59.84	Shakuntla Bhagwaria	INC	33,652	38.34	18,872
86	Rewari	66.90	Ajay Singh Yadav	INC	26,036	28.96	Vijay Somani	IND	21,112	23.49	4,924
87	Jatusana	66.58	Inderjeet Singh	INC	40,443	41.89	Jagdish Yadav	INLD	34,803	36.05	5,640
88	Mahendragarh	73.83	Dan Singh	INC	68,472	66.88	Ram Bilas Sharma	BJP	29,622	28.93	38,850
89	Ateli	69.47	Narender Singh	INC	31,755	34.59	Santosh D/O Bhagwan Singh	INLD	31,421	34.23	334
90	Narnaul	56.55	Moola Ram	IND	15,488	21.82	Radhey Shyam	IND	15,061	21.21	427

== Cabinet ==
- Om Prakash Chautala ministry
