= Kuldeep Sharma (politician) =

Indian politician

Member of Haryana Legislative Assembly
- In office 2009–2019
- Preceded by: Constituency Established
- Succeeded by: Nirmal Rani
- Constituency: Ganaur

Speaker of Haryana Legislative Assembly
- In office 4 March 2011 – 3 November 2014
- Preceded by: Harmohinder Singh Chatha
- Succeeded by: Kanwar Pal Gujjar

Personal details
- Born: 3 April 1957 (age 69)
- Citizenship: Indian
- Party: Indian National Congress
- Spouse: Neelam Sharma
- Occupation: Politician

Kuldeep Sharma (born 3 April 1957) is an Indian politician from Haryana and former member of Haryana Legislative Assembly from Ganaur.

He was first elected in 2009 Haryana Legislative assembly election as an Indian National Congress candidate, and served as the speaker of the house. Sharma was re-elected from the same constituency in the 2014 election.
