= Shanno Devi =

Indian politician

Speaker of the Haryana Legislative Assembly
- In office 6 December 1966 – 17 March 1967

Deputy speaker of the Punjab Legislative Assembly
- In office 20 March 1951 – 26 March 1951
- In office 19 March 1962 – 31 October 1966

Personal details
- Born: 1 June 1901
- Died: 17 July 1978 (aged 77)
- Party: Indian National Congress
- Occupation: Politician

Shanno Devi (1 June 1901 – 17 July 1978) was an Indian politician was the first woman speaker of a State Assembly in India. She was member of the Indian National Congress from the state of Punjab. She was the speaker of the Haryana Legislative Assembly from 6 December 1966 to 17 March 1967, and the deputy speakers of the Punjab Legislative Assembly from 19 March 1962 to 31 October 1966.

== Political career ==
Devi was from the Indian National Congress party and represented the Amritsar City West constituency (1951 to 1957) and the Jagadhri constituency (1962 to 1966) of the Indian state of Punjab. Devi was first elected to the Punjab Legislative Assembly (then undivided India) in 1940 from Multan defeating the son of Ganga Ram by about 6000 votes. She was re-elected for the same seat in 1946 by defeating her closest rival candidate by 19000 votes. In the following election of 1951, she contested on behalf of Indian National Congress and she won against Parkash Chand of the Bhartiya Jan Sangh by about 8000 votes, and was elected again as a member of the Punjab Legislative Assembly in the 1962 assembly election on an Indian National Congress ticket by defeating Inder Sain of the JS by about 5000 votes. On 6 December 1966, she joined Haryana legislative assembly as its first speaker, where she also served as a deputy speaker.

== Personal life ==
Devi was born in Multan, then undivided India. Her father Lal Sait Ram Khanna was a Government servant. Devi graduated from Kanya Maha Vidyalaya, Jalandhar and started indulging into politics as a student leader, holding posts as district president of the congress party. After the Partition of India she moved to Punjab, India. She was elected twice to the Punjab Legislative Assembly and then to Haryana Legislative Assembly.
