= 1996 Haryana Legislative Assembly election =

State Assembly elections in India

- 10 May 1996

All 90 seats to the Haryana Legislative Assembly 46 seats needed for a majority
- Turnout: 78,68,951 (70.5%)
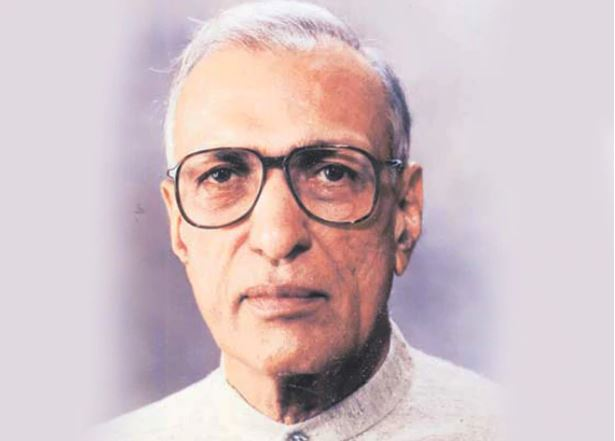

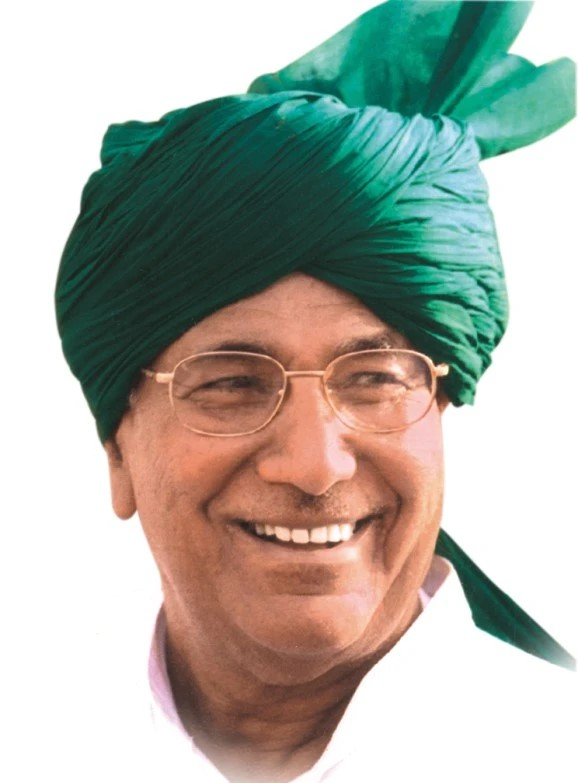

	First party	Second party	Third party
			BJP
Leader	Bansi Lal	Om Prakash Chautala	--
Party	HVP	SAP	BJP
Alliance	HVP+BJP	–	HVP+BJP
Leader since	1991	1996
Leader's seat	Tosham	Rori	--
Last election	12	New	2
Seats won	33	24	11
Seat change	▲21	▲24	▲9
Percentage	22.7%	20.6%	8.9%
Swing	▲10.16%	New
	Fourth party
Leader	Bhajan Lal Bishnoi
Party	INC
Leader since	1982
Leader's seat	Adampur
Last election	51
Seats won	9
Seat change	▼42
Percentage	20.8%
Swing	▼12.95%
Chief Minister before election
Bhajan Lal
Indian National Congress
Elected Chief Minister
Bansi Lal
Haryana Vikas Party

The 1996 Haryana Legislative Assembly election was held in the Indian state of Haryana to elect 90 members of the state's legislative assembly, in the first-past-the-post system from 90 constituencies.

Haryana Vikas Party' Bansi Lal was elected Chief Minister of Haryana after his party gained majority seats with the help of Bharatiya Janta Party.

== Parties and alliances ==
=== BJP + HVP Alliance ===
No.	Party	Flag	Symbol	Leader	Seats contested
1.	Haryana Vikas Party			Bansi Lal	65
2.	Bharatiya Janata Party			Ramesh Joshi	25

=== Indian National Congress ===
No.	Party	Flag	Symbol	Leader	Seats contested
1.	Indian National Congress			Bhajan Lal Bishnoi	90

=== Samata Party ===
No.	Party	Flag	Symbol	Leader	Seats contested
1.	Samata Party			Om Prakash Chautala	89

=== Tiwari Congress ===
No.	Party	Flag	Symbol	Leader	Seats contested
1.	All India Indira Congress (Tiwari)			Birender Singh	62

== Results ==
Summary of results of the Haryana Legislative Assembly election, 1996
Party	Candidates	Seats won	Votes	Vote %
Haryana Vikas Party	65	33	17,16,572	22.7%
Samta Party	89	24	15,57,914	20.6%
Bharatiya Janata Party	25	11	6,72,558	8.9%
Independent	2022	10	11,73,533	15.5%
Indian National Congress	90	9	15,76,882	20.8%
All India Indira Congress (Tiwari)	62	3	2,42,638	3.2%

== Elected members ==
Constituency			Winner				Runner Up				Margin	%
#	Name	Poll %	Candidate	Party	Votes	%	Candidate	Party	Votes	%	Margin	%
1	Kalka	69.97%	Chander Mohan	INC	54,929	40.97	Sham Lal	BJP	34,300	25.58	20,629	15.39
2	Naraingarh	78.08%	Raj Kumar	HVP	22,309	27.23	Man Singh	BSP	14,262	17.41	8,047	9.82
3	Sadhaura (SC)	78.09%	Ramji Lal	SAP	26,142	28.41	Deep Chand	IND	24,075	26.16	2,067	2.25
4	Chhachhrauli	86.52%	Akram Khan	IND	22,302	25.15	Aman Kumar	BSP	21,925	24.73	377	0.42
5	Yamunanagar	66.16%	Kamla Verma	BJP	35,825	35.50	Malik Chand	IND	18,369	18.20	17,456	17.30
6	Jagadhri	78.41%	Subhash Chand	HVP	26,709	29.39	Bishan Lal Saini	BSP	20,074	22.09	6,635	7.30
7	Mullana (SC)	73.79%	Rishal Singh	SAP	22,592	26.46	Phool Chand	INC	20,930	24.51	1,662	1.95
8	Ambala Cant.	67.17%	Anil	IND	22,735	40.10	Raj Rani	INC	16,645	29.36	6,090	10.74
9	Ambala City	66.74%	Faqir Chand	BJP	28,570	38.18	Sumer Chand	INC	24,900	33.27	3,670	4.91
10	Naggal	78.33%	Nirmal Singh	IND	34,822	38.43	Jasbir Singh Mallaur	HVP	15,162	16.73	19,660	21.70
11	Indri	78.66%	Bhim Sen	IND	20,930	21.63	Des Raj	INC	16,698	17.25	4,232	4.38
12	Nilokheri	78.67%	Jai Singh	INC	31,536	36.02	Bakshish Singh	SAP	21,954	25.08	9,582	10.94
13	Karnal	67.90%	Shashipal Mehta	BJP	35,511	37.53	Jai Parkash	INC	27,093	28.63	8,418	8.90
14	Jundla (SC)	69.37%	Nafe Singh	SAP	26,722	34.54	Raj Kumar	INC	15,470	19.99	11,252	14.55
15	Gharaunda	72.59%	Ramesh Sulekh Chand	BJP	20,230	24.19	Ramesh Kumar Rana	SAP	20,219	24.18	11	0.01
16	Assandh (SC)	65.47%	Krishan Lal	SAP	28,333	37.90	Rajinder Singh	HVP	25,840	34.57	2,493	3.33
17	Panipat	70.02%	Om Parkash	IND	49,123	42.38	Balbir Paul	INC	31,508	27.18	17,615	15.20
18	Samalkha	76.07%	Kartar Singh Bhadana	HVP	20,103	23.04	Phool Pati	SAP	17,723	20.31	2,380	2.73
19	Naultha	74.13%	Bijender	HVP	24,790	31.24	Satbir Singh Kadian	SAP	23,667	29.82	1,123	1.42
20	Shahabad	77.21%	Kapoor Chand	BJP	27,307	32.29	Mohinder Singh	SAP	19,664	23.26	7,643	9.03
21	Radaur (SC)	78.39%	Banta Ram	SAP	30,765	36.85	Ram Singh	INC	21,184	25.38	9,581	11.47
22	Thanesar	76.35%	Ashok Kumar	SAP	25,175	25.57	Ramesh Kumar	IND	20,200	20.51	4,975	5.06
23	Pehowa	77.22%	Jasvinder Singh Sandhu	SAP	35,482	39.10	Balbir Singh Saini	INC	21,887	24.12	13,595	14.98
24	Guhla (SC)	78.54%	Dillu Ram	INC	34,385	35.75	Amar Singh	SAP	31,599	32.85	2,786	2.90
25	Kaithal	73.79%	Charan Dass	SAP	27,384	33.65	Roshan Lal Tiwari	HVP	23,145	28.44	4,239	5.21
26	Pundri	78.32%	Narendra Sharma	IND	21,542	25.39	Ishwar Singh	INC	20,311	23.94	1,231	1.45
27	Pai	74.79%	Ram Pal	SAP	24,291	31.60	Nar Singh	HVP	22,016	28.64	2,275	2.96
28	Hassangarh	64.73%	Balwant Singh	SAP	20,454	34.75	Veerendra Kumar	AIIC(T)	15,108	25.67	5,346	9.08
29	Kiloi	68.72%	Shri Krishan	SAP	27,884	40.37	Ram Phool	HVP	19,719	28.55	8,165	11.82
30	Rohtak	70.69%	Shri Kishan Dass	HVP	56,863	64.85	Subhash Batra	INC	24,045	27.42	32,818	37.43
31	Meham	71.51%	Balbir	SAP	24,210	32.24	Anand Singh	INC	23,953	31.89	257	0.35
32	Kalanaur (SC)	65.77%	Kartar Devi	INC	16,733	28.47	Jai Narain	BJP	15,818	26.91	915	1.56
33	Beri	71.53%	Virender Pal	SAP	20,522	30.20	Raghbir Singh	INC	16,435	24.19	4,087	6.01
34	Salhawas	63.76%	Dharmavir	HVP	27,840	41.54	Suraj Bhan	INC	11,517	17.18	16,323	24.36
35	Jhajjar (SC)	61.96%	Ram Parkash Dahiya	HVP	22,266	32.75	Kirpa Ram	JHM	15,657	23.03	6,609	9.72
36	Badli	69.61%	Dhir Pal Singh	SAP	23,305	35.01	Manphool Singh	HVP	17,743	26.66	5,562	8.35
37	Bahadurgarh	63.58%	Nafe Singh	SAP	27,555	33.78	Raj Pal	HVP	26,657	32.68	898	1.10
38	Baroda (SC)	69.02%	Ramesh Kumar	SAP	28,181	41.51	Chander Bhan	HVP	26,197	38.59	1,984	2.92
39	Gohana	68.98%	Jagbir Singh	HVP	22,837	28.88	Kishan Singh	SAP	21,965	27.77	872	1.11
40	Kailana	71.73%	Ramesh Chander	HVP	24,390	30.47	Ved Singh	SAP	22,724	28.38	1,666	2.09
41	Sonepat	64.40%	Dev Raj Dewan	IND	47,269	53.15	Om Parkash Hari Singh	SP	10,129	11.39	37,140	41.76
42	Rai	62.85%	Suraj Mal	SAP	23,490	32.04	Mohander	HVP	19,512	26.61	3,978	5.43
43	Rohat	65.56%	Krishana Gahlawat	HVP	23,799	34.34	Padam Singh	SAP	21,676	31.28	2,123	3.06
44	Kalayat (SC)	65.01%	Ram Bhaj	HVP	23,351	36.41	Dina Ram	SAP	18,233	28.43	5,118	7.98
45	Narwana	81.04%	Randeep Singh	INC	28,286	32.63	Jai Parkash	HVP	27,437	31.65	849	0.98
46	Uchana Kalan	71.78%	Birender Singh	AIIC(T)	21,755	28.18	Bhag Singh	SAP	17,843	23.11	3,912	5.07
47	Rajond	70.87%	Satvinder Singh	AIIC(T)	18,179	27.56	Ram Kumar	SAP	15,255	23.13	2,924	4.43
48	Jind	72.64%	Brij Mohan	HVP	40,803	44.48	Mange Ram	INC	22,245	24.25	18,558	20.23
49	Julana	72.53%	Satya Narain Lathar	HVP	34,195	46.77	Suraj Bhan S/o Harnarain	SAP	22,425	30.67	11,770	16.10
50	Safidon	76.81%	Ramphal	SAP	21,502	25.22	Ranbir Singh	HVP	17,301	20.30	4,201	4.92
51	Faridabad	54.70%	Chander	BJP	62,925	49.31	A.c. Chaudhary	INC	28,518	22.35	34,407	26.96
52	Mewla Maharajpur	52.22%	Krishan Pal	BJP	66,300	46.97	Mahender Pratap Singh	INC	39,883	28.25	26,417	18.72
53	Ballabgarh	56.63%	Anand Kumar	BJP	51,721	53.54	Rajender S/o Gaj Raj	INC	19,558	20.25	32,163	33.29
54	Palwal	69.85%	Karan Singh Dalal	HVP	40,219	50.64	Subhash Chaudhary	BSP	13,832	17.42	26,387	33.22
55	Hassanpur (SC)	63.57%	Jagdish Nayar	HVP	28,318	40.97	Udai Bhan	IND	22,748	32.91	5,570	8.06
56	Hathin	68.11%	Harsh Kumar	HVP	16,252	23.51	Ajmat Khan	AIIC(T)	10,131	14.65	6,121	8.86
57	Ferozepur Jhirka	65.76%	Azad	SAP	24,056	30.27	Abdul Razaq	HVP	21,414	26.94	2,642	3.33
58	Nuh	63.28%	Khurshid Ahmad	AIIC(T)	20,401	30.36	Hamid Hussain	SAP	12,274	18.27	8,127	12.09
59	Taoru	71.26%	Suraj Pal	BJP	29,995	35.06	Zakir Hussain	INC	18,480	21.60	11,515	13.46
60	Sohna	70.73%	Narbir Singh	HVP	30,411	35.04	Dharam Pal	INC	20,606	23.74	9,805	11.30
61	Gurgaon	61.81%	Dharambir	INC	33,716	30.38	Sita Ram	BJP	26,358	23.75	7,358	6.63
62	Pataudi (SC)	62.83%	Narayan Singh	HVP	31,834	43.18	Ram Veer Singh	SAP	16,409	22.26	15,425	20.92
63	Badhra	70.00%	Nripender	HVP	42,142	52.98	Ravinder	SAP	14,715	18.50	27,427	34.48
64	Dadri	68.64%	Satpal Sangwan	HVP	33,690	44.81	Jagjit Singh	INC	22,269	29.62	11,421	15.19
65	Mundhal Khurd	65.38%	Chhater Singh Chauhan	HVP	33,788	47.50	Shashi Ranjan	INC	19,017	26.73	14,771	20.77
66	Bhiwani	65.13%	Ram Bhaj	HVP	44,584	59.20	Shiv Kumar	INC	19,712	26.17	24,872	33.03
67	Tosham	74.29%	Bansi Lal	HVP	47,274	53.60	Dharam Bir	INC	34,472	39.09	12,802	14.51
68	Loharu	67.72%	Somvir Singh	HVP	47,559	57.86	Hiranand Arya	SAP	11,126	13.54	36,433	44.32
69	Bawani Khera (SC)	69.51%	Jagan Nath	HVP	44,372	57.22	Raghvir Singh Ranga	SAP	13,838	17.84	30,534	39.38
70	Barwala	74.58%	Relu Ram	IND	30,046	34.91	Anant Ram	HVP	19,257	22.37	10,789	12.54
71	Narnaund	76.25%	Jaswant Singh	HVP	31,439	41.04	Virender Singh	INC	20,666	26.98	10,773	14.06
72	Hansi	73.65%	Attar Singh	HVP	51,767	60.44	Amir Chand	INC	23,096	26.97	28,671	33.47
73	Bhattu Kalan	84.20%	Mani Ram Godara	HVP	41,433	48.25	Sampat Singh	SAP	33,355	38.84	8,078	9.41
74	Hissar	68.00%	Om Parkash Mahajan	IND	30,451	32.93	Hari Singh Saini	INC	26,646	28.81	3,805	4.12
75	Ghirai	73.74%	Kanwal Singh	HVP	21,497	27.20	Chhatar Pal Singh	IND	21,171	26.79	326	0.41
76	Tohana	80.58%	Vinod Kumar	SAP	39,957	41.71	S. Harpal Singh	INC	29,575	30.88	10,382	10.83
77	Ratia (SC)	76.27%	Ram Sarup Rama	HVP	28,044	34.86	Atma Singh	SAP	17,327	21.54	10,717	13.32
78	Fatehabad	73.94%	Harminder Singh	HVP	36,199	38.71	Lila Krishan	INC	18,078	19.33	18,121	19.38
79	Adampur	79.66%	Bhajan Lal	INC	54,140	57.15	Surender Singh	HVP	34,133	36.03	20,007	21.12
80	Darba Kalan	84.49%	Vidya Devi	SAP	36,944	38.51	Prahlad Singh	HVP	36,750	38.31	194	0.20
81	Ellenabad (SC)	76.99%	Bhagi Ram	SAP	37,107	40.86	Karnail Singh	HVP	29,909	32.94	7,198	7.92
82	Sirsa	75.26%	Ganeshi Lal	BJP	35,419	35.42	Lachhman Dass	INC	31,599	31.60	3,820	3.82
83	Rori	86.34%	Om Parkash	SAP	41,867	45.28	Jagdish Nehra	INC	33,485	36.22	8,382	9.06
84	Dabwali (SC)	75.98%	Mani Ram	SAP	29,434	35.81	Jagsir Singh	HVP	20,697	25.18	8,737	10.63
85	Bawal (SC)	63.71%	Jaswant Singh	HVP	38,973	47.61	Shakuntala Bhagwaria	INC	23,974	29.29	14,999	18.32
86	Rewari	65.55%	Ajay Singh	INC	22,099	26.70	Randhir Singh Kapriwas	IND	20,332	24.56	1,767	2.14
87	Jatusana	66.47%	Jagdish Yadav	HVP	38,185	41.31	Inderjeet Singh	INC	29,304	31.70	8,881	9.61
88	Mahendragarh	70.00%	Ram Bilas	BJP	19,015	20.84	Dan Singh	IND	15,307	16.77	3,708	4.07
89	Ateli	66.50%	Narender Singh	INC	22,114	26.14	Rao Omprakash Engineer	HVP	19,270	22.78	2,844	3.36
90	Narnaul	69.21%	Kailash Chand	IND	25,671	31.19	Kailash Chand	BJP	20,325	24.70	5,346	6.49

== Bye Elections ==
A.C. No.	Constituency Name	Type A.C.	Winner Candidate	Party
1.	Adampur	Gen	Kuldeep Bishnoi	Indian National Congress
2.	Fatehabad	Gen	Sampat Singh	Haryana Lok Dal (Rashtriya)
3.	Jhajjar	SC	Kanta Devi	Haryana Vikas Party
