= Pawan Kharkhoda =

Indian politician

Member of Haryana Legislative Assembly
- Incumbent
- Assumed office 8 October 2024
- Preceded by: Jaiveer Singh
- Constituency: Kharkhoda

Personal details
- Political party: Bharatiya Janata Party
- Profession: Politician

Pawan Kharkhoda is an Indian politician from Haryana. He is a Member of the Haryana Legislative Assembly from 2024, representing Kharkhoda Assembly constituency as a Member of the Bharatiya Janta Party.

== See also ==
- 2024 Haryana Legislative Assembly election
- Haryana Legislative Assembly
