= Beri Assembly constituency =

Legislative Assembly constituency in Haryana State, India

Coordinates: 28.7°N 76.58°E

Beri
- Constituency No. 67 for the Haryana Legislative Assembly

Constituency details
- Country: India
- Region: North India
- State: Haryana
- District: Jhajjar
- Lok Sabha constituency: Rohtak
- Total electors: 1,85,556
- Reservation: None

Member of Legislative Assembly
- 15th Haryana Legislative Assembly
- Incumbent Raghuvir Singh Kadian
- Party: Indian National Congress

Beri is one of the 90 constituencies of the Legislative Assembly of Haryana state in India.

It is part of Jhajjar district.

== Members of the Legislative Assembly ==
Election	Name	Party
1967	Partap Singh Doulta	Indian National Congress
1968	Ran Singh Ahlawat	Indian National Congress
1972	Partap Singh Doulta	Independent
1977	Ran Singh Ahlawat	Janata Party
1980^	Ajit Singh Kadian	Janata Party (Secular)
1982	Om Parkash Kadyan	Lokdal
1987	Raghuvir Singh Kadian	Lokdal
1991	Om Parkash Kadyan	Indian National Congress
1996	Virender Pal Ahlawat	Samata Party
2000	Raghuvir Singh Kadian	Indian National Congress
2005	Raghuvir Singh Kadian	Indian National Congress
2009	Raghuvir Singh Kadian	Indian National Congress
2014	Raghuvir Singh Kadian	Indian National Congress
2019	Raghuvir Singh Kadian	Indian National Congress
2024	Raghuvir Singh Kadian	Indian National Congress

== Election results ==
=== Assembly Election 2024 ===
2024 Haryana Legislative Assembly election: Beri
Party	Candidate	Votes	%	±%
INC	Raghuvir Singh Kadian	60,630	50.96	▲11.56
BJP	Sanjay Kumar	25,160	21.15	▼7.17
Independent	Amit Kumar	24,626	20.70	New
INLD	Permod	2,171	1.82	New
Independent	Inderjeet Suhag	2,162	1.82	New
AAP	Sonu	1,682	1.41	▼0.23
Independent	Gowardhan Singh	1,127	0.95	New
NOTA	None of the Above	289	0.24	New
Margin of victory		35,470	29.82	▲18.73
Turnout		1,18,966	64.91	▼1.98
Registered electors		1,85,556		▲4.97
INC hold		Swing	▲11.56	

=== Assembly Election 2019 ===
2019 Haryana Legislative Assembly election: Beri
Party	Candidate	Votes	%	±%
INC	Dr. Raghuvir Singh Kadian	46,022	39.40	▲7.80
BJP	Vikram Kadian	33,070	28.31	▲8.03
JJP	Upender Kadian	14,969	12.82	New
BSP	Ramesh Dalal	8,764	7.50	▲6.38
Independent	Shiv Kumar Rangeela	6,059	5.19	New
NCP	Ajay Ahlawat Advocate	2,564	2.20	New
AAP	Ashvini Dulhera	1,924	1.65	New
LSP	Rahul	1,219	1.04	New
INLD	Om Pahlawan	1,040	0.89	▼13.19
Margin of victory		12,952	11.09	▲7.23
Turnout		1,16,796	66.90	▼6.67
Registered electors		1,74,588		▲10.35
INC hold		Swing	▲7.80	

=== Assembly Election 2014 ===
2014 Haryana Legislative Assembly election: Beri
Party	Candidate	Votes	%	±%
INC	Dr. Raghuvir Singh Kadian	36,793	31.61	▼7.85
Independent	Chatar Singh	32,300	27.75	New
BJP	Vikram Kadian	23,609	20.28	▲19.65
INLD	Dr. Santosh Dighal	16,394	14.08	▼2.16
Independent	Sunil Kumar @ Ballu Pehlwan	2,683	2.30	New
HLP	Vijay Pal	1,309	1.12	New
BSP	Sanjay Kumar	1,304	1.12	▼0.74
HJCPV	P. T. Mouji Ram	1,271	1.09	New
Margin of victory		4,493	3.86	▼1.55
Turnout		1,16,402	73.57	▲4.58
Registered electors		1,58,218		▲14.11
INC hold		Swing	▼7.85	

=== Assembly Election 2009 ===
2009 Haryana Legislative Assembly election: Beri
Party	Candidate	Votes	%	±%
INC	Dr. Raghuvir Singh Kadian	37,742	39.46	▼16.55
Independent	Chatar Singh	32,566	34.05	New
INLD	Om Parkash	15,538	16.24	▼19.68
Haryana Swantra Party	Sumit	4,549	4.76	New
BSP	Shyam Phul	1,784	1.87	New
Independent	Mukesh Dutt	738	0.77	New
BJP	Ashok Kumar	603	0.63	▼3.19
HJC(BL)	Sunil Kumar	570	0.60	New
Margin of victory		5,176	5.41	▼14.68
Turnout		95,650	68.99	▼3.55
Registered electors		1,38,650		▲30.60
INC hold		Swing	▼16.55	

=== Assembly Election 2005 ===
2005 Haryana Legislative Assembly election: Beri
Party	Candidate	Votes	%	±%
INC	Dr. Raghuvir Singh Kadian	43,133	56.01	▲6.14
INLD	Om Pehlwan	27,665	35.93	▼4.39
BJP	Dr. Santosh Gochhi	2,943	3.82	New
SP	Balwan Sharma	1,685	2.19	New
Independent	Samander Singh	544	0.71	New
Margin of victory		15,468	20.09	▲10.54
Turnout		77,007	72.53	▲2.22
Registered electors		1,06,166		▲7.90
INC hold		Swing	▲6.14	

=== Assembly Election 2000 ===
2000 Haryana Legislative Assembly election: Beri
Party	Candidate	Votes	%	±%
INC	Dr. Raghuvir Singh Kadian	34,504	49.87	▲25.68
INLD	Dr.Virender Pal	27,896	40.32	New
Independent	Santosh Devi	3,569	5.16	New
HVP	Kultaj Singh	1,595	2.31	▼21.33
Independent	Ramniwas	875	1.26	New
BSP	Jai Bhagwan	389	0.56	New
Independent	Harish Chander	360	0.52	New
Margin of victory		6,608	9.55	▲3.54
Turnout		69,188	70.33	▲1.22
Registered electors		98,394		▲0.05
INC gain from SAP		Swing	▲19.67	

=== Assembly Election 1996 ===
1996 Haryana Legislative Assembly election: Beri
Party	Candidate	Votes	%	±%
SAP	Virender Pal	20,522	30.20	New
INC	Raghubir Singh	16,435	24.19	▼18.69
HVP	Om Prakash Beri	16,061	23.64	New
Independent	Surender	6,676	9.82	New
SP	Anand Prakash	2,734	4.02	New
Independent	Usha	2,019	2.97	New
Independent	Harishamsher Singh	640	0.94	New
AIIC(T)	Prem Singh	497	0.73	New
Independent	Surender Singh	421	0.62	New
Margin of victory		4,087	6.01	▼3.48
Turnout		67,950	71.53	▲8.47
Registered electors		98,340		▲1.94
SAP gain from INC		Swing	▼12.67	

=== Assembly Election 1991 ===
1991 Haryana Legislative Assembly election: Beri
Party	Candidate	Votes	%	±%
INC	Om Parkash	25,077	42.87	▲24.21
JP	Virender Pal	19,521	33.38	New
JD	Raghubir Singh	12,032	20.57	New
Independent	Anand Parkash	744	1.27	New
BJP	Baljit	354	0.61	New
Margin of victory		5,556	9.50	▼10.39
Turnout		58,489	62.59	▼1.11
Registered electors		96,473		▲9.42
INC gain from LKD		Swing	▼2.80	

=== Assembly Election 1987 ===
1987 Haryana Legislative Assembly election: Beri
Party	Candidate	Votes	%	±%
LKD	Raghubir Singh	24,860	45.67	▼12.07
VHP	Om Parkash	14,034	25.78	New
INC	Ram Singh	10,158	18.66	▼13.52
Independent	Prahlad	3,032	5.57	New
Independent	Hans Raj	783	1.44	New
Independent	Sat Bir Singh	539	0.99	New
Margin of victory		10,826	19.89	▼5.67
Turnout		54,432	64.27	▼1.91
Registered electors		88,169		▲17.66
LKD hold		Swing	▼12.07	

=== Assembly Election 1982 ===
1982 Haryana Legislative Assembly election: Beri
Party	Candidate	Votes	%	±%
LKD	Om Parkash	27,536	57.74	New
INC	Dalip Singh	15,347	32.18	New
Independent	Partap Singh Doulta	2,348	4.92	New
Independent	Mahinder Singh	1,308	2.74	New
Independent	Sat Parkash	454	0.95	New
JP	Ran Singh	367	0.77	New
Margin of victory		12,189	25.56	
Turnout		47,691	64.50	
Registered electors		74,933		
LKD win (new seat)				

=== Assembly By-election 1980 ===
1980 Haryana Legislative Assembly by-election: Beri
Party	Candidate	Votes	%	±%
	Ajit Singh Kadian	23,174		New
JP	B.Singh	20,917		New
Independent	R. Kumar	359		New
Independent	Raghbir	265		New
Independent	I.Singh	243		New
Margin of victory		2,257		
win (new seat)				

=== Assembly Election 1977 ===
1977 Haryana Legislative Assembly election: Beri
Party	Candidate	Votes	%	±%
JP	Ran Singh	22,228	53.30	New
Independent	Dalip Singh	18,244	43.75	New
Independent	Barhma	1,132	2.71	New
Margin of victory		3,984	9.55	▲0.66
Turnout		41,704	66.12	▲5.25
Registered electors		63,787		▼7.06
JP gain from Independent		Swing		

=== Assembly Election 1972 ===
1972 Haryana Legislative Assembly election: Beri
Party	Candidate	Votes	%	±%
Independent	Partap Singh Doulta	20,782	50.36	New
INC	Nawa Singh	17,112	41.46	▼26.11
Independent	Bera Singh	2,950	7.15	New
Independent	Bhagwana	426	1.03	New
Margin of victory		3,670	8.89	▼39.44
Turnout		41,270	61.32	▼0.40
Registered electors		68,633		▲13.18
Independent gain from INC		Swing	▼17.21	

=== Assembly Election 1968 ===
1968 Haryana Legislative Assembly election: Beri
Party	Candidate	Votes	%	±%
INC	Ran Singh	24,801	67.57	▲15.07
Independent	Partap Singh Doulta	7,060	19.23	New
SWA	Raghubir Singh	4,133	11.26	New
VHP	Brij Mohan	512	1.39	New
Independent	Jagdish	198	0.54	New
Margin of victory		17,741	48.34	▲15.89
Turnout		36,704	61.62	▼13.11
Registered electors		60,640		▲3.83
INC hold		Swing	▲15.07	

=== Assembly Election 1967 ===
1967 Haryana Legislative Assembly election: Beri
Party	Candidate	Votes	%	±%
INC	Partap Singh Doulta	22,577	52.50	New
Independent	N. Kumar	8,624	20.05	New
Independent	U. Singh	7,369	17.14	New
Independent	H. Singh	2,248	5.23	New
Independent	K. Singh	1,379	3.21	New
Independent	C. Bhan	807	1.88	New
Margin of victory		13,953	32.45	
Turnout		43,004	76.62	
Registered electors		58,403		
INC win (new seat)				

== See also ==
- List of constituencies of the Haryana Legislative Assembly
- Jhajjar district
