= Kharkhoda Assembly constituency =

Legislative Assembly constituency in Haryana State, India

Coordinates: 28.88°N 76.91°E

- Constituency No. 30 for the Haryana Legislative Assembly

Constituency details
- Country: India
- Region: North India
- State: Haryana
- District: Sonipat
- Lok Sabha constituency: Sonipat
- Established: 2009
- Total electors: 1,77,712
- Reservation: SC

Member of Legislative Assembly
- 15th Haryana Legislative Assembly
- Incumbent Pawan Kharkhoda
- Party: BJP
- Elected year: 2024

Kharkhauda is one of the 90 Legislative Assembly constituencies of Haryana state in India.

It is part of Sonipat district and is reserved for candidates belonging to the Scheduled Castes.

== Members of the Legislative Assembly ==
Year	Member	Party
Till 2009: Constituency did not exist
2009	Jaiveer Singh	Indian National Congress
2014	Jaiveer Singh	Indian National Congress
2019	Jaiveer Singh	Indian National Congress
2024	Pawan Kharkhoda	Bharatiya Janata Party

== Election results ==
=== Assembly Election 2024 ===
2024 Haryana Legislative Assembly election: Kharkhoda
Party	Candidate	Votes	%	±%
BJP	Pawan Kharkhoda	58,084	51.08	▲30.81
INC	Jaiveer Singh	52,449	46.12	▲8.07
INLD	Pritam Khokar	1,593	1.40	▲0.62
NOTA	None of the Above	336	0.30	New
Margin of victory		5,635	4.96	▲3.43
Turnout		1,13,716	64.20	▲1.46
Registered electors		1,77,712		▲9.62
BJP gain from INC		Swing	▲13.02	

=== Assembly Election 2019 ===
2019 Haryana Legislative Assembly election: Kharkhoda
Party	Candidate	Votes	%	±%
INC	Jaiveer Singh	38,577	38.05	▲0.64
JJP	Pawan Kharkhoda	37,033	36.53	
BJP	Meena Rani	20,542	20.26	▲6.46
BSP	Shadi Lal	1,655	1.63	
LSP	Sagar Bakheta	1,270	1.25	
INLD	Vinod	789	0.78	▼21.45
AAP	Bindu	541	0.53	
Margin of victory		1,544	1.52	▼12.50
Turnout		1,01,373	62.74	▼7.28
Registered electors		1,61,586		▲11.89
INC hold		Swing	▲0.64	

=== Assembly Election 2014 ===
2014 Haryana Legislative Assembly election: Kharkhoda
Party	Candidate	Votes	%	±%
INC	Jaiveer Singh	37,829	37.41	▼26.64
Independent	Pawan Kharkhoda	23,647	23.39	
INLD	Anita	22,477	22.23	▼4.75
BJP	Dr. Kuldeep Kakran	13,953	13.80	▲10.54
HJC(BL)	Neelam Rani	1,271	1.26	▼0.1
Margin of victory		14,182	14.03	▼23.05
Turnout		1,01,108	70.01	▲13.18
Registered electors		1,44,415		▲20.36
INC hold		Swing	▼26.64	

=== Assembly Election 2009 ===
2009 Haryana Legislative Assembly election: Kharkhoda
Party	Candidate	Votes	%	±%
INC	Jaiveer Singh	43,684	64.06	
INLD	Raju	18,400	26.98	
BJP	Ram Niwas	2,224	3.26	
BSP	Rajvir	2,110	3.09	
HJC(BL)	Mahavir Singh Kalon	923	1.35	
Independent	Phool Singh	544	0.80	
Margin of victory		25,284	37.08	
Turnout		68,193	56.83	
Registered electors		1,19,988		
INC win (new seat)				

== See also ==
- List of constituencies of the Haryana Legislative Assembly
- Sonipat district
