= Jagadhri Assembly constituency =

Constituency of the Haryana legislative assembly in India

Coordinates: 30.16°N 77.30°E

Jagadhri
- Constituency No. 8 for the Haryana Legislative Assembly

Constituency details
- Country: India
- Region: North India
- State: Haryana
- Division: Ambala
- District: Yamunanagar
- Lok Sabha constituency: Ambala
- Established: 1967
- Total electors: 2,32,785
- Reservation: None

Member of Legislative Assembly
- 15th Haryana Legislative Assembly
- Incumbent Akram Khan
- Party: Indian National Congress
- Elected year: 2024

Jagadhri is one of the 90 constituencies in the Haryana Legislative Assembly of Haryana, a northern state of India. Jagadhri is also part of Ambala Lok Sabha constituency. Jagadhri assembly constituency is considered as gurjar dominant. The number of gurjar voters in this seat is around 60 thousand. Since 1977 the MLA from this area (previously Chhachhrauli assembly constituency) has been from the gurjar community.

== Members of Legislative Assembly ==
Year	Member	Party
1967	D. Prakash	Bharatiya Jana Sangh
1968	Rameshwar Dass	Indian National Congress
1972	Om Prakash Sharma	Independent
1977	Brij Mohan	Janata Party
1982	Om Parkash Sharma	Indian National Congress
1987	Brij Mohan	Bharatiya Janata Party
1991	Om Prakash Sharma	Haryana Vikas Party
1996	Subhash Chand	Haryana Vikas Party
2000	Bishan Lal Saini	Bahujan Samaj Party
2005	Subhash Chand	Indian National Congress
2009	Akram Khan	Bahujan Samaj Party
2014	Kanwar Pal Gujjar	Bharatiya Janata Party
2019	Kanwar Pal Gujjar	Bharatiya Janata Party
2024	Akram Khan	Indian National Congress

== Election results ==
=== Assembly Election 2024 ===
2024 Haryana Legislative Assembly election: Jagadhri
Party	Candidate	Votes	%	±%
INC	Akram Khan	67,403	36.83	▲7.53
BJP	Kanwar Pal Gujjar	60,535	33.07	▼5.81
AAP	Adarsh Pal Singh	43,813	23.94	New
BSP	Darshan Lal	6,436	3.52	▼24.59
ASP(KR)	Ashok Kumar	2,684	1.47	New
NOTA	None of the Above	749	0.41	▼0.23
Margin of victory		6,868	3.75	▼5.84
Turnout		1,83,032	78.27	▼0.55
Registered electors		2,32,785		▲7.98
INC gain from BJP		Swing	▼2.06	

=== Assembly Election 2019 ===
2019 Haryana Legislative Assembly election: Jagadhri
Party	Candidate	Votes	%	±%
BJP	Kanwar Pal Gujjar	66,376	38.88	▼5.90
INC	Akram Khan	50,003	29.29	▲23.53
BSP	Adarsh Pal Singh	47,988	28.11	3.94
JJP	Arjun Singh	2,342	1.37	
NOTA	Nota	1,091	0.64	
INLD	Baljeet Sharma	861	0.50	−8.42
Margin of victory		16,373	9.59	−11.02
Turnout		1,70,709	78.83	−5.92
Registered electors		2,16,563		10.77
BJP hold		Swing	-5.90	

=== Assembly Election 2014 ===
2014 Haryana Legislative Assembly election: Jagadhri
Party	Candidate	Votes	%	±%
BJP	Kanwar Pal Gujjar	74,203	44.78	20.28
BSP	Akram Khan	40,047	24.17	−6.68
INLD	Dr. Bishan Lal Saini	14,794	8.93	−5.33
Independent	Uday Vir Singh	10,609	6.40	
INC	Bhupal Singh Bhati	9,549	5.76	−21.74
HJC(BL)	Arjun Singh	3,569	2.15	
Independent	Zakir Hussain	2,743	1.66	
Independent	Lal Singh	2,506	1.51	
HLP	Rajiv Gupta (Kaku)	1,690	1.02	
Independent	Jai Chand Chauhan	1,001	0.60	
Margin of victory		34,156	20.61	17.26
Turnout		1,65,695	84.75	2.98
Registered electors		1,95,515		23.71
BJP gain from BSP		Swing	13.93	

=== Assembly Election 2009 ===
2009 Haryana Legislative Assembly election: Jagadhri
Party	Candidate	Votes	%	±%
BSP	Akram Khan	39,868	30.85	1.96
INC	Subhash Chand	35,540	27.50	−4.54
BJP	Kanwar Pal Gujjar	31,657	24.50	12.06
INLD	Rajiv Kumar	18,425	14.26	−6.77
Independent	Jai Chand Chauhan	1,509	1.17	
SP	Harpreet Singh	882	0.68	
NCP	Sudesh Rani	758	0.59	
Margin of victory		4,328	3.35	0.19
Turnout		1,29,222	81.77	4.76
Registered electors		1,58,037		20.24
BSP gain from INC		Swing	-1.19	

=== Assembly Election 2005 ===
2005 Haryana Legislative Assembly election: Jagadhri
Party	Candidate	Votes	%	±%
INC	Subhash Chand	32,432	32.04	18.13
BSP	Rajiv Kumar	29,238	28.89	−0.24
INLD	Dr. Bishan Lal Saini	21,284	21.03	
BJP	Rameshwar Kumar	12,591	12.44	−13.00
BRP	Jitender Pal	2,778	2.74	
Independent	Shekhar Babu	1,076	1.06	
Independent	Vikram Singh	688	0.68	
Independent	Pradeep Kumar	553	0.55	
Margin of victory		3,194	3.16	−0.53
Turnout		1,01,208	77.00	1.96
Registered electors		1,31,435		10.65
INC gain from BSP		Swing	2.92	

=== Assembly Election 2000 ===
2000 Haryana Legislative Assembly election: Jagadhri
Party	Candidate	Votes	%	±%
BSP	Dr. Bishan Lal Saini	25,952	29.13	7.03
BJP	Rameshwar Chouhan	22,670	25.44	
Independent	Subhash Chand	14,163	15.89	
INC	Dr. Ram Parkash	12,400	13.92	−1.97
HVP	Nand Kumar	4,714	5.29	−24.10
Independent	Bal Krishan Goel	2,584	2.90	
Independent	Dr. Om Parkash	2,563	2.88	
Independent	Dalip Chand	2,359	2.65	
NCP	Ranvir Singh	927	1.04	
Independent	Ishwar Chand	587	0.66	
Margin of victory		3,282	3.68	−3.62
Turnout		89,104	75.04	−3.37
Registered electors		1,18,787		−1.68
BSP gain from HVP		Swing	5.66	

=== Assembly Election 1996 ===
1996 Haryana Legislative Assembly election: Jagadhri
Party	Candidate	Votes	%	±%
HVP	Subhash Chand	26,709	29.39	5.93
BSP	Bishan Lal Saini	20,074	22.09	0.85
INC	Om Parkash Sharma	14,434	15.88	3.74
SAP	Raj Kumar Saini	13,890	15.29	
Independent	Bal Krishan Goel	7,570	8.33	
AIIC(T)	Devinder	2,040	2.24	
Independent	Rajeev Kumar Gupta	1,583	1.74	
Independent	Ombir Singh	1,513	1.66	
Independent	Pradeep Kumar	618	0.68	
Independent	Nasib Singh	611	0.67	
Independent	Ramesh Chand	500	0.55	
Margin of victory		6,635	7.30	5.07
Turnout		90,871	78.41	5.55
Registered electors		1,20,818		14.66
HVP hold		Swing	5.93	

=== Assembly Election 1991 ===
1991 Haryana Legislative Assembly election: Jagadhri
Party	Candidate	Votes	%	±%
HVP	Om Prakash Sharma	17,316	23.47	
BSP	Vishan Lal Saini	15,671	21.24	
BJP	Brij Mohan	14,364	19.47	−27.47
JP	Raj Kumar Saini	12,919	17.51	15.65
INC	Bal Krishan Goel	8,963	12.15	−16.08
Independent	Ramesh Kashyap	2,167	2.94	
Independent	Chaman Lal	747	1.01	
Independent	Mohan	678	0.92	
Independent	Dharam Vir	477	0.65	
Margin of victory		1,645	2.23	−16.48
Turnout		73,791	72.86	−3.43
Registered electors		1,05,373		18.83
HVP gain from BJP		Swing	-23.47	

=== Assembly Election 1987 ===
1987 Haryana Legislative Assembly election: Jagadhri
Party	Candidate	Votes	%	±%
BJP	Brij Mohan	31,236	46.94	13.62
INC	Om Parkash Sharma	18,787	28.23	−13.05
Independent	Amuna Kumar	10,007	15.04	
Independent	Kawar Bhan	3,527	5.30	
JP	Tajinder Parkash	1,239	1.86	−0.50
Independent	Rajiv Kumar	578	0.87	
Independent	Sunil Kumar	421	0.63	
Margin of victory		12,449	18.71	10.74
Turnout		66,550	76.29	5.63
Registered electors		88,674		22.89
BJP gain from INC		Swing	5.66	

=== Assembly Election 1982 ===
1982 Haryana Legislative Assembly election: Jagadhri
Party	Candidate	Votes	%	±%
INC	Om Prakash Sharma	20,639	41.28	−0.08
BJP	Brij Mohan	16,656	33.31	
Independent	Jugal Kishore	4,377	8.75	
Independent	Samey Singh	1,737	3.47	
JP	Ram Parkash	1,183	2.37	−53.30
Independent	Maya Ram	986	1.97	
Independent	Munshi Ram	943	1.89	
Independent	Hari Ram	935	1.87	
Independent	Ram Kishan	654	1.31	
Independent	Puran	500	1.00	
Independent	Kamlesh Kumar	399	0.80	
Margin of victory		3,983	7.97	−6.33
Turnout		49,998	70.66	−1.05
Registered electors		72,155		18.04
INC gain from JP		Swing	-14.38	

=== Assembly Election 1977 ===
1977 Haryana Legislative Assembly election: Jagadhri
Party	Candidate	Votes	%	±%
JP	Brij Mohan	24,091	55.66	
INC	Om Prakash Sharma	17,902	41.36	10.86
Independent	Jagjit Singh	684	1.58	
Independent	Satpal	391	0.90	
Margin of victory		6,189	14.30	4.05
Turnout		43,281	71.71	−3.81
Registered electors		61,128		9.22
JP gain from Independent		Swing	14.91	

=== Assembly Election 1972 ===
1972 Haryana Legislative Assembly election: Jagadhri
Party	Candidate	Votes	%	±%
Independent	Om Prakash Sharma	16,618	40.75	
INC	Sadhu Ram	12,439	30.50	−15.73
ABJS	Brij Mohan	7,977	19.56	−12.66
Independent	Mangal Ram	1,085	2.66	
Independent	Rattan Lal	852	2.09	
RPI(K)	Sumer Chand	774	1.90	
Independent	Samey Singh	471	1.16	
Independent	Sher Singh	295	0.72	
Independent	Harnam Singh	266	0.65	
Margin of victory		4,179	10.25	−3.76
Turnout		40,777	75.52	17.15
Registered electors		55,970		8.75
Independent gain from INC		Swing	-5.48	

=== Assembly Election 1968 ===
1968 Haryana Legislative Assembly election: Jagadhri
Party	Candidate	Votes	%	±%
INC	Rameshwar Dass	13,534	46.23	10.18
ABJS	Brij Mohan	9,432	32.22	−8.90
Independent	Om Prakash Sharma	4,692	16.03	
RPI	Mansa Ram	794	2.71	
PSP	Kanwar Bhan	367	1.25	
Independent	Madan Mohan	184	0.63	
Independent	Ajmer Singh	130	0.44	
Independent	Rahun Lal	78	0.27	
Independent	Shame Singh	63	0.22	
Margin of victory		4,102	14.01	8.94
Turnout		29,274	58.38	−20.15
Registered electors		51,468		7.13
INC gain from BSP		Swing	5.11	

=== Assembly Election 1967 ===
1967 Haryana Legislative Assembly election: Jagadhri
Party	Candidate	Votes	%	±%
ABJS	D. Prakash	14,665	41.12	
INC	G. Singh	12,856	36.05	
SWA	R. A. Singh	3,742	10.49	
Independent	T. Dass	2,740	7.68	
Independent	M. Ram	1,169	3.28	
Independent	S. Chand	338	0.95	
Independent	R. Dass	154	0.43	
Margin of victory		1,809	5.07	
Turnout		35,664	78.52	
Registered electors		48,041		
BSP win (new seat)				

== See also ==
- Jagadhri
- Yamuna Nagar district
- List of constituencies of Haryana Legislative Assembly
