= Ishwar Singh (politician, born 1950) =

Indian politician (born 1950)

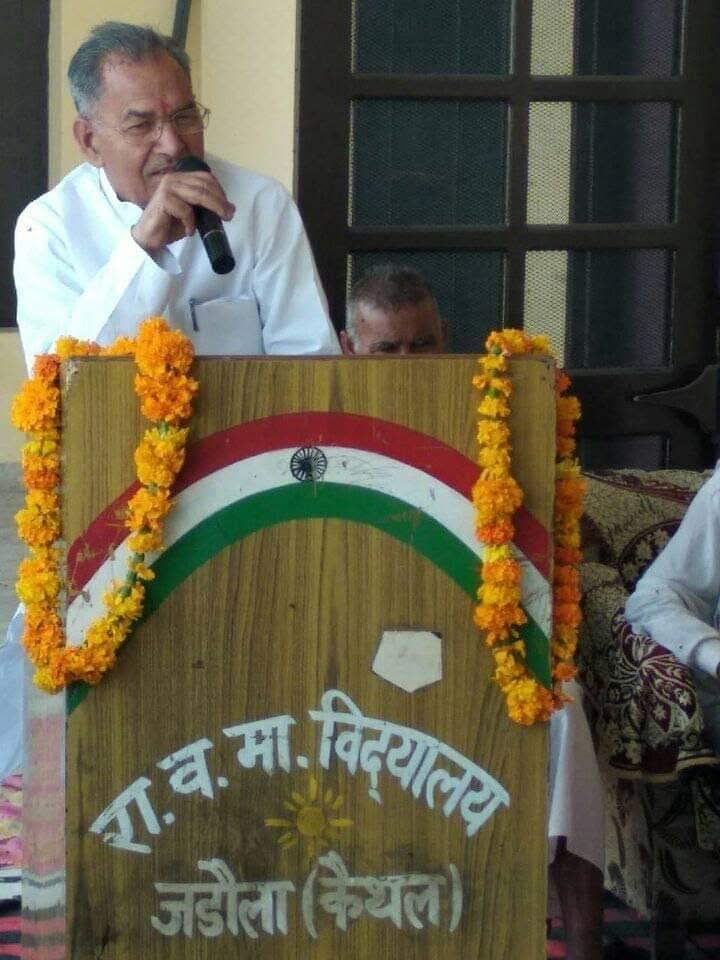
A speech on the essence of life of Valmiki Ji Bhagwan at Balmiki Parkat Divas

Ishwar Singh Jadaula (born 10 April 1950, Jadaula, Kaithal district, Haryana) is a politician from Indian Congress in Haryana state of India. He was a member of Rajya Sabha from Haryana during 2008–2014. He is also an elected Vidhan sabha member from Guhla Cheeka.

He lives at Kurukshetra in the Haryana.
