= Harvinder Kalyan =

Indian politician

Speaker of the Haryana Legislative Assembly
- Incumbent
- Assumed office 25 October 2024
- Leader of the House: Nayab Singh Saini
- Deputy Speaker: Krishan Lal Middha
- Preceded by: Gian Chand Gupta
- Constituency: Gharaunda (Karnal district) in Haryana Vidhan Sabha

Member of Haryana Legislative Assembly
- Incumbent
- Assumed office 2014
- Preceded by: Narender Sangwan
- Constituency: Gharaunda

Personal details
- Born: 15 January 1967 (age 59) Kutail, Karnal, Haryana
- Party: Bharatiya Janata Party
- Other political affiliations: Bahujan Samaj Party; Indian National Congress
- Spouse: Reshma Kalyan Naik
- Children: Ayeshna Kalyan
- Education: BTech from BNCoE, Pusad under Sant Gadge Baba Amravati University
- Occupation: Politician
- Profession: Agriculturist
- Website: Official Website
- As of 21 October, 2014

Harvinder Kalyan (born 15 January 1967) is an Indian politician. He was elected to the Haryana Legislative Assembly from Gharaunda in the 2014, 2019 and 2024 Haryana Legislative Assembly election as a member of the Bharatiya Janata Party. He was elected as the 19th speaker of Haryana Legislative Assembly on 25 October 2024.

== Personal life ==
Harvinder Singh Kalyan was born in 1967 in village Kutail near Madhuban of Karnal in Haryana to his farmer father Devi Singh Kalyan (Ex Chairman Haryana Agro Industries Corporation Ltd.(Govt. Of Haryana).

In 1985, he enrolled for the Bachelor of Engineering (Civil engineering) degree from Babasaheb Naik College of Engineering, Pusad (BNCoE, Pusad) (affiliated to Sant Gadge Baba Amravati University) from Pusad town of Yavatmal district in Maharashtra.

He is married to Reshma Kalyan (housewife/writer), daughter of Manohar Naik. Manohar Naik has been elected as Member of the Legislative Assembly from the Pusad (Vidhan Sabha constituency) of the Maharashtra Legislative Assembly in Yavatmal district from 1995 to 1999, 2004–2009, 2009–2014, and 2014–2019.

== Political life ==
Kalyan joined politics under the youth wing of Indian National Congress, which he eventually left to join the Bahujan Samaj Party.

In 2009, contested and lost elections from Gharaunda constituency of Haryana Legislative Assembly as Bahujan Samaj Party candidate.

In July 2014, he left the Bahujan Samaj Party and joined the Bhartiya Janata Party (BJP). On 19 October 2014, he contested and won elections with a margin of 18700 votes from Gharaunda constituency of Haryana Legislative Assembly as a BJP candidate.

He was elected Speaker of the Haryana Legislative Assembly on October 25, 2024.
