= Kanwar Pal Gujjar =

Indian politician

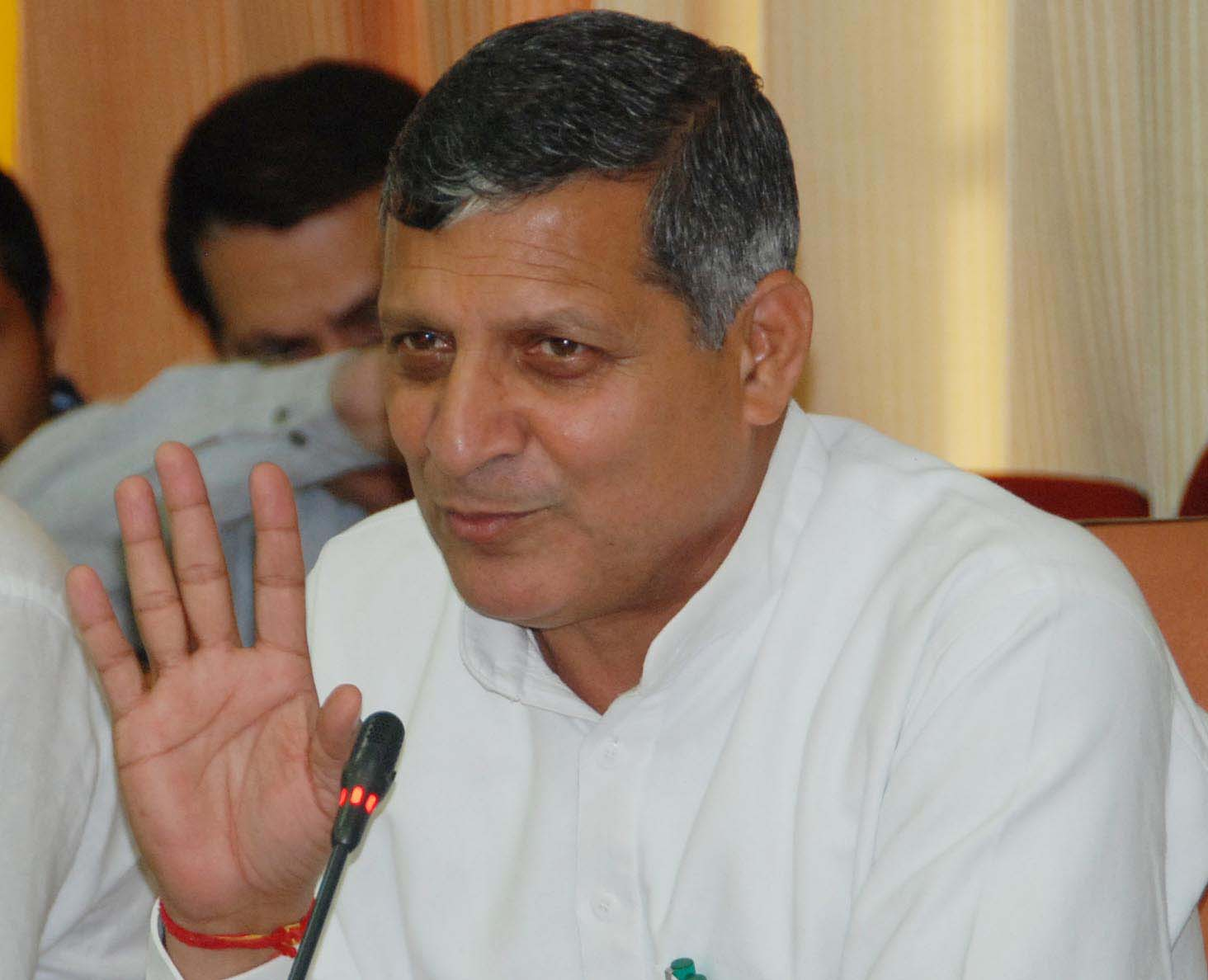

Cabinet Minister Government of Haryana
- In office 14 November 2019 – 17 October 2024
- Ministry: Term
- Minister of Education: 14 November 2019 -17 October 2024
- Minister of Forest: 14 November 2019 - 17 October 2024
- Minister of Parliamentary Affairs: 14 November 2019 -17 October 2024
- Minister of Tourism, Hospitality, Art & Cultural Affairs: 14 November 2019 - 17 October 2024

Speaker of Haryana Legislative Assembly
- In office 3 November 2014 – 4 November 2019
- Preceded by: Kuldeep Sharma
- Succeeded by: Gian Chand Gupta

Member of Haryana Legislative Assembly
- In office 2014–2024
- Preceded by: Akram Khan
- Succeeded by: Akram Khan
- Constituency: Jagadhri
- In office 2000–2005
- Preceded by: Akram Khan
- Succeeded by: Arjan Singh
- Constituency: Chhachhrauli

Personal details
- Born: 8 May 1960 (age 66) Bahadurpur, Punjab, India
- Party: Bharatiya Janata Party
- Spouse: Sunita Gujjar
- Children: 3
- Occupation: Politician

Kanwar Pal Gujjar is an Indian politician who was the speaker of the Haryana Legislative Assembly from 26 October 2014 to 4 November 2019. He is a member of the Bharatiya Janata Party and was elected to the assembly from Jagadhri two times. He was born in Yamunanagar, Haryana.

== Life and career ==
Gujjar was born to a Hindu Gujjar family on 8 May 1960 in Bahadurpur to father Chandan Singh and mother Jagwati Devi. He did matriculation from Haryana Board of School.

Education, Bhiwani in 1976-1977 and then pursued Bachelor of Arts from Mukund Lal College Yamunanagar, Kurukshetra University in 1979, but dropped out in the second year. Gujjar is married to Sunita Gujjar, with whom he has two daughters and a son, Nischal Chaudary.

He became MLA twice. He was elected MLA in 2000 when INLD-BJP ruled the state.
