= Ishwar Singh (politician, born 1926) =

Indian politician (1926–1998)

Chaudhary Ishwar Singh (5 November 1926 – 1998) was a leader of the Congress Party and served as the speaker of Haryana Vidhan Sabha from 1991 to 1996. He was elected as MLA for four times by the electorates of Pundri constituency of Haryana. He is well known for his contribution to uplift the poor and oppressed people in the society, and for uplifting girls to get higher education by building three degree colleges in the constituency of Pundri.

== Background ==
Chaudhary Ishwar Singh was born on 5 November 1926 in the house of a poor farmer of village Staundi of Karnal District, Haryana. He received early education in his native village, and then moved to Panipat where he came out in his matriculation examination with flying colors. Then, he moved to Rohtak and obtained his degree in Bachelors of Arts. To obtain his license of teaching degree, he moved to Meerut.

During Chaudhary Ishwar Singh's time at these centers of learning, certain incidents occurred which helped to determine the future course of his life. His teachers were very much impressed by his learning habits and took keen interest in grooming him into a great scholar. His pursuit of knowledge took him to different places which left an indelible imprint on his adolescent and young formative mind. During his student days, Chaudhary Ishwar Singh went through the teachings and messages of Swami Vivekananda, which provided him with a purpose for social action: although he could not have the stimulus of personal contact with Swami. He decided to mitigate the social ills of illiteracy, poverty and hunger which affected rural people.

After Chaudhary Ishwar Singh obtained his L.T Degree, instead of competing for lucrative government jobs, he chose to join the teaching profession which suited his temperament and qualifications, as he considered it a noble profession to serve the community. In his first attempt, he was selected by the interview board: the education department issued him an appointment letter for the post of social studies teacher and posted him at Government High School, Samalkha (Karnal). Though his academic career came to an end when he became a teacher and then became active in politics, his pursuit of learning remained a lifelong passion.

== Political career ==
Chaudhary Ishwar Singh was elected to the Haryana Assembly as an independent candidate for the first time in 1968, and then again in 1972, 1982, and 1991 on the Congress Party ticket. He had political vision and was instrumental in setting up many educational institutions. He served as the Speaker of the Haryana Vidhan Sabha from 1991 to 1996 under the last Bhajan Lal government of Haryana.

== Social contribution ==
Chaudhary Ishwar Singh had significant influence due to his closeness to Bhajan Lal, the Bishnoi leader and Chief Minister of Haryana on several occasions. Apart from that, Ishwar Singh Ji did a lot of social work. He ensured the opening of many educational institutions in his constituency of Pundri, and had a power station built close to the village of Kaul.

Chaudhary Ishwar Singh also stressed the importance of education for women, stating that "if a male is educated a family will be educated but if a female will educated the whole society will be educated". In this context, he established three women colleges named as Ch. Ishwar Singh Kanya Mahavidyalaya, Fatehpur-Pundri (Kaithal) in 1984, and Ch. Ishwar Singh Kanya Mahavidyalaya, Dhand-Dadwana (Kaithal), Ch. Ishwar Singh Mahila Shikshan Mahavidyalaya, Fatehpur-Pundri (Kaithal) in 1994. These colleges provide higher education to the girls of about sixty villages.
