= Raghuvir Singh Kadian =

Indian politician (born 1944)

Dr Raghuvir Singh Kadian

14th Speaker of the Haryana Legislative Assembly
- In office 13 January 2006 - 27 October 2009
- Preceded by: Harmohinder Singh Chatha
- Succeeded by: Harmohinder Singh Chatha

Cabinet Minister Government of Haryana
- In office 1987 - 1990
- Ministry and departments: Cooperation; Forest; Jails; Labour; Employment

Member of the Haryana Legislative Assembly
- Incumbent
- Assumed office 1987 - 1991, 2000 - present

Personal details
- Born: 5 June 1944 (age 82) Dubaldhan, Punjab, British India
- Party: Indian National Congress
- Spouse: Uttra Kadian
- Children: 2

Raghuvir Singh Kadian (born 5 June 1944) is an Indian politician who served as the 14th speaker of the Haryana Legislative Assembly from 2006 to 2009. He is a former cabinet minister in the Government of Haryana between 1987 and 1990. He has been elected to the Haryana Legislative Assembly for seven terms between 1987 and 2024 from Beri, Haryana. He was also elected as the pro tem speaker of the Haryana Legislative Assembly in 2019. He is a member of the Indian National Congress.

== Early life and education ==
Raghuvir Singh Kadian was born on June 5, 1944, in Dubaldhan, Punjab, British India. Kadian educational qualifications are Bachelor of Science (Ag. & A.H.) Hons, Master of Science (An. Sc.), and a Ph.D. in Animal Nutrition.

== Political career ==
Kadian political career began with his involvement in student politics, where he served as the President of the Haryana Students Association from 1967 to 1969. His mainstream political career began when he was elected as a Member of the Haryana Legislative Assembly (MLA) from the Beri constituency in 1987. He has been elected to the Haryana Legislative Assembly for seven terms between 1987 and 2024 from Beri, Haryana.

He served as the cabinet minister for Cooperation, Forest, Jails, Labour, and Employment from 1987 to 1990 in Government of Haryana. He also served as the 14th speaker of the Haryana Legislative Assembly from January 2006 to October 2009. In 2019, he was elected as the pro-term speaker of the Haryana Legislative Assembly.
