= All India Indira Congress (Tiwari) =

- Leader: Narayan Datt Tiwari
- Founder: Narayan Datt Tiwari, Arjun Singh, Natwar Singh, Rangarajan Kumaramangalam & Vazhapadi Ramamurthy
- Founded: 1996
- Dissolved: 1997
- Split from: Indian National Congress
- Merged into: Indian National Congress
- Colours: Aqua Blue

Election symbol
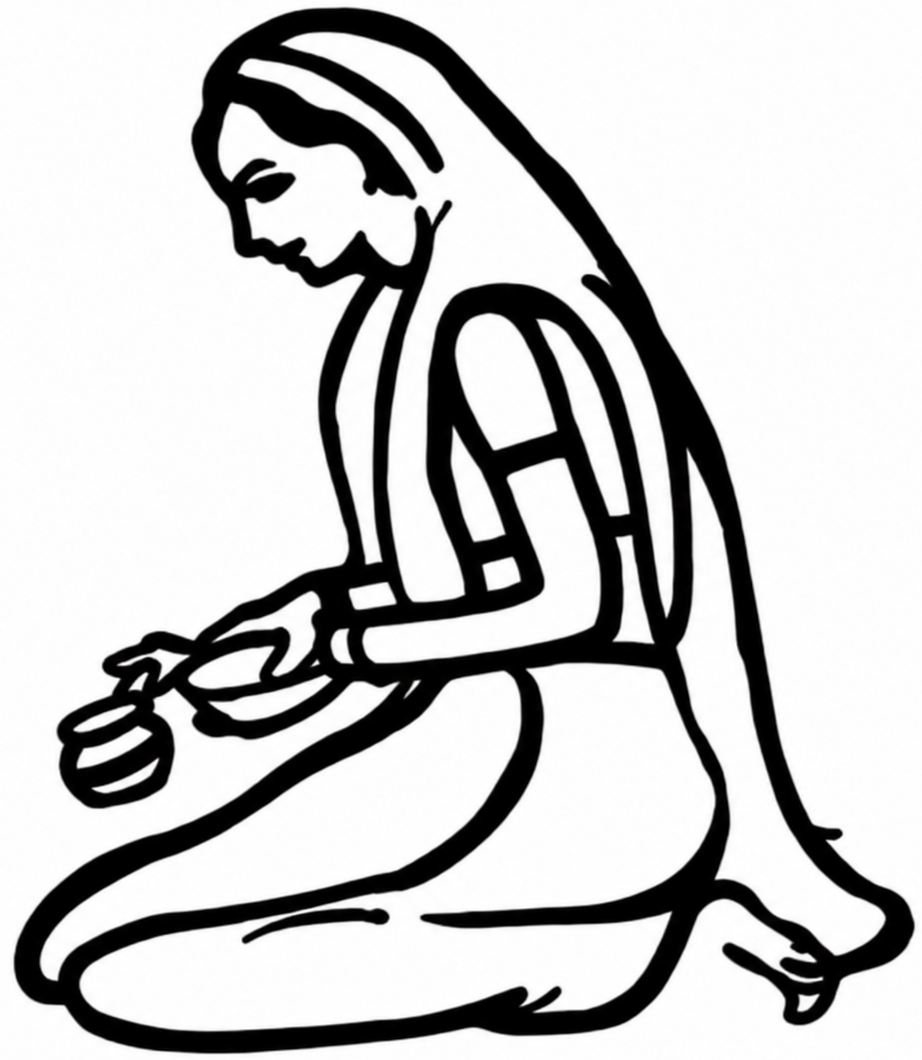
- A Lady offering flowers

The All India Indira Congress (Tiwari) was a political party in India set up by dissident Indian National Congress party leaders Narayan Datt Tiwari, Arjun Singh, Natwar Singh, Rangarajan Kumaramangalam, Yashpal Arya and Sheila Dikshit. The party later merged with the Congress party when Sitaram Kesari took over the party.

== Election results ==
| Year | Election | Seats Won | Change in Seat | % of votes | votes swing | Ref. |
|---|---|---|---|---|---|---|
| 1996 Indian general election | 11th Lok Sabha | 4 | ▲4 | 1.5% | 1.5% | |
| 1996 Uttar Pradesh Legislative Assembly election | | 4 | ▲4 | 1.3% | 1.3% | |
| 1996 Jammu and Kashmir Legislative Assembly election | | 1 | ▲1 | 0.7% | 0.7% | |
| 1996 West Bengal Legislative Assembly election | | 0 | 0 | 0.1% | 0.1% | |
| 1996 Tamil Nadu Legislative Assembly election | | 0 | 0 | 0.1% | 0.1% | |

== See also ==
- Indian National Congress breakaway parties
- Indian National Congress (R)
