= Gurgaon Lok Sabha constituency =

Lok Sabha constituency in Haryana

Coordinates: 28.4°N 77.0°E

Gurgaon HR-9
- Lok Sabha constituency
- Interactive Map Outlining Gurgaon Lok Sabha constituency

Constituency details
- Country: India
- Region: North India
- State: Haryana
- Assembly constituencies: Bawal; Rewari; Pataudi; Badshahpur; Gurgaon; Sohna; Nuh; Ferozepur Jhirka; Punahana
- Established: 1952
- Reservation: None

Member of Parliament
- 18th Lok Sabha
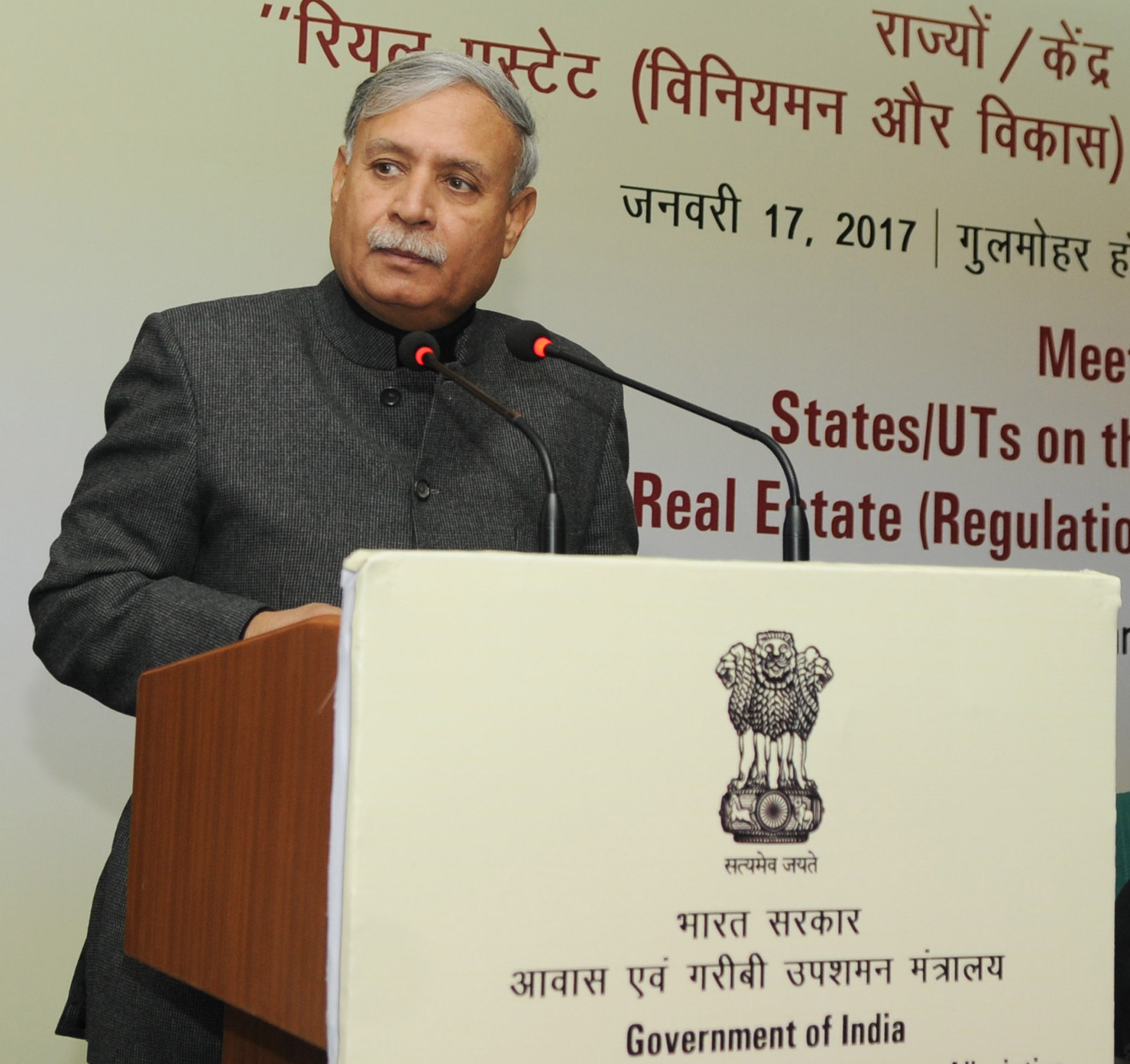
- Incumbent Rao Inderjit Singh
- Party: BJP
- Alliance: NDA
- Elected year: 2024

Gurgaon Lok Sabha constituency is one of the 10 Lok Sabha (parliamentary) constituencies in Haryana state in northern India. This constituency was in existence from 1952 to 1977. It came into existence again in 2008 as a part of the implementation of the recommendations of the Delimitation Commission of India constituted in 2002. This constituency was created by merging five assembly segments of erstwhile Mahendragarh constituency with four assembly segments of erstwhile Faridabad constituency.

== Assembly segments ==
At present, Gurgaon Lok Sabha constituency comprises nine Vidhan Sabha (legislative assembly) constituencies. These are:

#	Name	District	Member	Party	Leading (in 2024)
72	Bawal (SC)	Rewari	Krishan Kumar	BJP	BJP
74	Rewari	Rewari	Laxman Singh Yadav	BJP	BJP
75	Pataudi (SC)	Gurugram	Bimla Chaudhary	BJP	BJP
76	Badshahpur	Gurugram	Rao Narbir Singh	BJP	BJP
77	Gurgaon	Gurugram	Mukesh Sharma	BJP	BJP
78	Sohna	Gurugram	Tejpal Tanwar	BJP	BJP
79	Nuh	Nuh	Aftab Ahmed	INC	INC
80	Ferozepur Jhirka	Nuh	Mamman Khan	INC	INC
81	Punahana	Nuh	Mohammad Ilyas	INC	INC

== Members of Parliament ==
The Gurgaon Lok Sabha constituency was created in 1952. The list of Member of Parliament (MP) is as follows:

Year	Member	Party
1952	Thakur Das Bhargava	Indian National Congress
1957	Abul Kalam Azad	Indian National Congress
1958^	Prakash Vir Shastri	Independent
1962	Gajraj Singh Yadav	Indian National Congress
1967	Abdul Ghani Dar	Independent
1971	Tayyab Husain	Indian National Congress
1977–2008 : Constituency abolished
2009	Rao Inderjit Singh	Indian National Congress
2014	Rao Inderjit Singh	Bharatiya Janata Party
2019	Rao Inderjit Singh	Bharatiya Janata Party
2024	Rao Inderjit Singh	Bharatiya Janata Party

== Election results ==
=== 2024 ===
2024 Indian general election: Gurgaon
Party	Candidate	Votes	%	±%
BJP	Rao Inderjit Singh	808,336	50.48	▼10.46
INC	Raj Babbar	7,33,257	45.79	▲11.55
JJP	Rahul Yadav (Fazilpuria)	13,278	0.83	▲0.23
BSP	Vijay Khatana	8,946	0.56	▼1.24
NOTA	None of the Above	6,417	0.4	▲0.03
Majority		75,079	4.68	▼22.02
Turnout		16,03,233	62.02	▼5.31
BJP hold		Swing		

Legislative Assembly Wise Results

No.	Assembly	1st Position	Party	Votes	2nd Position	Party	Votes	Margin
72	Bawal	Rao Inderjit Singh	BJP	85,903	Raj Babbar	INC	63,654	▲22,249
74	Rewari	Rao Inderjit Singh	BJP	96,938	Raj Babbar	INC	60,409	▲36,529
75	Pataudi	Rao Inderjit Singh	BJP	1,01,187	Raj Babbar	INC	58,197	▲42,990
76	Badshahpur	Rao Inderjit Singh	BJP	1,96,805	Raj Babbar	INC	75,081	▲1,21,724
77	Gurgaon	Rao Inderjit Singh	BJP	1,62,825	Raj Babbar	INC	60,439	▲1,02,386
78	Sohna	Rao Inderjit Singh	BJP	89,654	Raj Babbar	INC	83,543	▲6,111
79	Nuh	Raj Babbar	INC	98,070	Rao Inderjit Singh	BJP	30,568	▼67,502
80	Ferozepur Jhirka	Raj Babbar	INC	1,23,658	Rao Inderjit Singh	BJP	25,100	▼98,558
81	Punahana	Raj Babbar	INC	1,08,645	Rao Inderjit Singh	BJP	16,181	▼92,464

=== 2019 ===
2019 Indian general elections: Gurgaon
Party	Candidate	Votes	%	±%
BJP	Rao Inderjit Singh	881,546	60.94	▲12.08
INC	Capt. Ajay Singh Yadav	4,95,290	34.24	▲24.12
NOTA	None of the Above	5,389	0.37	▲0.17
Majority		3,86,256	26.70	▲5.90
Turnout		14,48,101	67.33	▼4.25
BJP hold		Swing		

Legislative Assembly Wise Results

No.	Assembly	1st Position	Party	Votes	2nd Position	Party	Votes	Margin
72	Bawal	Rao Inderjit Singh	BJP	1,16,493	Capt. Ajay Singh Yadav	INC	26,500	▲89,993
74	Rewari	Rao Inderjit Singh	BJP	1,19,912	Capt. Ajay Singh Yadav	INC	34,811	▲85,101
75	Pataudi	Rao Inderjit Singh	BJP	1,20,882	Capt. Ajay Singh Yadav	INC	26,062	▲94,820
76	Badshahpur	Rao Inderjit Singh	BJP	1,85,138	Capt. Ajay Singh Yadav	INC	42,188	▲1,42,950
77	Gurgaon	Rao Inderjit Singh	BJP	1,62,627	Capt. Ajay Singh Yadav	INC	39,520	▲1,23,107
78	Sohna	Rao Inderjit Singh	BJP	89,198	Capt. Ajay Singh Yadav	INC	53,336	▲35,862
79	Nuh	Capt. Ajay Singh Yadav	INC	82,116	Rao Inderjit Singh	BJP	34,258	▼47,858
80	Ferozepur Jhirka	Capt. Ajay Singh Yadav	INC	1,08,324	Rao Inderjit Singh	BJP	26,466	▼81,858
81	Punahana	Capt. Ajay Singh Yadav	INC	81,876	Rao Inderjit Singh	BJP	22,267	▼59,609

=== 2014 ===
2014 Indian general elections: Gurgaon
Party	Candidate	Votes	%	±%
BJP	Rao Inderjit Singh	644,780	48.82	▲32.18
INLD	Zakir Hussain	3,70,058	28.02	▲28.02
INC	Rao Dharampal	1,33,713	10.12	▼26.71
AAP	Yogendra Yadav	79,452	6.02	New
BSP	Dharampal	65,009	4.92	▼20.69
NOTA	None of the Above	2,657	0.20	▲0.20
Majority		2,74,722	20.80	▲9.58
Turnout		13,20,620	71.58	▲10.81
BJP gain from INC		Swing	▲32.18	

Legislative Assembly Wise Results

No.	Assembly	1st Position	Party	Votes	2nd Position	Party	Votes	3rd Position	Party	Votes	4th Position	Party	Votes	5th Position	Party	Votes
72	Bawal	Rao Inderjit Singh	BJP	84,828	Zakir Hussain	INLD	20,387	Dharampal	BSP	11,318	Rao Dharampal	INC	9,612	Yogendra Yadav	AAP	5,008
74	Rewari	Rao Inderjit Singh	BJP	95,353	Rao Dharampal	INC	13,093	Zakir Hussain	INLD	11,298	Yogendra Yadav	AAP	11,265	Dharampal	BSP	6,296
75	Pataudi	Rao Inderjit Singh	BJP	92,020	Zakir Hussain	INLD	18,449	Rao Dharampal	INC	12,599	Dharampal	BSP	8,193	Yogendra Yadav	AAP	4,452
76	Badshahpur	Rao Inderjit Singh	BJP	1,30,918	Rao Dharampal	INC	22,193	Yogendra Yadav	AAP	21,670	Zakir Hussain	INLD	18,876	Dharampal	BSP	11,665
77	Gurgaon	Rao Inderjit Singh	BJP	1,25,164	Yogendra Yadav	AAP	27,601	Rao Dharampal	INC	17,687	Zakir Hussain	INLD	11,317	Dharampal	BSP	5,147
78	Sohna	Rao Inderjit Singh	BJP	64,165	Zakir Hussain	INLD	46,849	Dharampal	BSP	15,816	Rao Dharampal	INC	8,712	Yogendra Yadav	AAP	3,650
79	Nuh	Zakir Hussain	INLD	69,175	Rao Inderjit Singh	BJP	21,121	Rao Dharampal	INC	17,968	Dharampal	BSP	2,591	Yogendra Yadav	AAP	1,884
80	Ferozepur Jhirka	Zakir Hussain	INLD	92,536	Rao Dharampal	INC	18,945	Rao Inderjit Singh	BJP	18,172	Dharampal	BSP	2,101	Yogendra Yadav	AAP	2,065
81	Punahana	Zakir Hussain	INLD	81,165	Rao Dharampal	INC	12,888	Rao Inderjit Singh	BJP	12,745	Dharampal	BSP	1,880	Yogendra Yadav	AAP	1,847

=== 2009 ===
2009 Indian general elections: Gurgaon
Party	Candidate	Votes	%	±%
INC	Rao Inderjit Singh	278,516	36.83	
BSP	Zakir Hussain	1,93,652	25.61	
BJP	Sudha Yadav	1,25,837	16.64	
HJC(BL)	Narbir Singh	1,17,260	15.51	
LJP	Yashpal	11,838	1.57	
Majority		84,864	11.22	
Turnout		7,56,236	60.77	new
INC win (new seat)				

== See also ==
- Gurgaon district
- Mahendragarh (Lok Sabha constituency)
- List of constituencies of the Lok Sabha
