= First Khattar ministry =

Indian political party roles in 2014

- Ministry of the State of Haryana
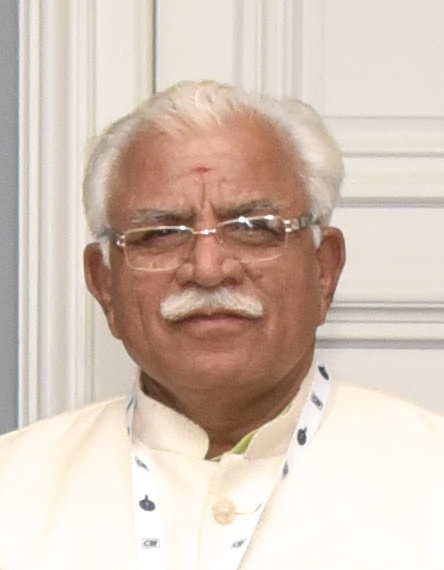
- Manohar Lal Khattar; Hon'ble Chief Minister of Haryana
- Date formed: 26 October 2014
- Date dissolved: 27 October 2019

People and organisations
- Head of state: Kaptan Singh Solanki; Satyadev Narayan Arya
- Head of government: Manohar Lal Khattar
- Member parties: Bhartiya Janta Party
- Status in legislature: Majority
- Opposition party: Indian National Lok Dal
- Opposition leader: Abhay Chautala

History
- Election: 2014
- Predecessor: Second Hooda ministry
- Successor: Second Khattar ministry

Bharatiya Janata Party secured absolute majority in 2014 Haryana assembly election. Manohar Lal Khattar was elected leader of the party in the assembly and was sworn in as chief minister of Haryana in October 2014. Here is the list of the ministers:

== Council of Ministers ==
Portfolio	Minister	Took office	Left office	Party
Chief Minister; Home; General Administration; Personnel & Training; Power; Town & Country Planning and Urban Estates; Administration of Justice; Electronics & Information Technology; Raj Bhawan Affairs; Renewable Energy; Other departments not allocated to any Minister	Manohar Lal Khattar	26 October 2014	27 October 2019	BJP
Minister of Education; Minister of Technical Education; Minister of Tourism; Minister of Parliamentary Affairs; Minister of Archaeology & Museums; Minister of Hospitality	Ram Bilas Sharma	26 October 2014	27 October 2019	BJP
Minister of Transport	Ram Bilas Sharma	26 October 2014	24 July 2015	BJP
Minister of Transport	Krishan Lal Panwar	24 July 2015	27 October 2019	BJP
Minister of Food & Supplies	Ram Bilas Sharma	26 October 2014	24 July 2015	BJP
Minister of Food & Supplies	Karan Dev Kamboj (Independent Charge)	24 July 2015	27 October 2019	BJP
Minister of Civil Aviation	Ram Bilas Sharma	26 October 2014	22 July 2016	BJP
Minister of Civil Aviation	Rao Narbir Singh	22 July 2016	27 October 2019	BJP
Minister of Finance; Minister of Revenue & Disaster Management; Minister of Excise & Taxation; Minister of Planning; Minister of Law & Justice; Minister of Institutional Finance & Credit Control; Minister of Consolidation; Minister of Rehabilitation	Captain Abhimanyu	26 October 2014	27 October 2019	BJP
Minister of Forests	Captain Abhimanyu	26 October 2014	24 July 2015	BJP
Minister of Forests	Rao Narbir Singh	24 July 2015	27 October 2019	BJP
Minister of Industrial Training	Captain Abhimanyu	26 October 2014	24 July 2015	BJP
Minister of Industrial Training	Rao Narbir Singh	24 July 2015	22 July 2016	BJP
Minister of Industrial Training	Vipul Goel	22 July 2016	27 October 2019	BJP
Minister of Industries & Commerce	Captain Abhimanyu	26 October 2014	22 July 2016	BJP
Minister of Industries & Commerce	Vipul Goel	22 July 2016	27 October 2019	BJP
Minister of Environment	Captain Abhimanyu	26 October 2014	22 July 2016	BJP
Minister of Environment	Vipul Goel	22 July 2016	27 October 2019	BJP
Minister of Labour & Employment	Captain Abhimanyu	26 October 2014	22 July 2016	BJP
Minister of Labour & Employment	Nayab Singh (Independent Charge)	22 July 2016	3 June 2019	BJP
Minister of Agriculture; Minister of Development & Panchayat; Minister of Animal Husbandry & Dairying; Minister of Fisheries	O. P. Dhankar	26 October 2014	27 October 2019	BJP
Minister of Irrigation & Water Resources	O. P. Dhankar	26 October 2014	22 July 2016	BJP
Minister of Mines & Geology	O. P. Dhankar	22 July 2016	27 October 2019	BJP
Minister of Health; Minister of Medical Education & Research; Minister of AYUSH; Minister of Sports & Youth Affairs	Anil Vij	26 October 2014	27 October 2019	BJP
Minister of ESI	Anil Vij	26 October 2014	24 July 2015	BJP
Minister of ESI	Captain Abhimanyu	24 July 2015	27 October 2019	BJP
Minister of Archives	Anil Vij	24 July 2015	27 October 2019	BJP
Minister of Election	Anil Vij	26 October 2014	22 July 2016	BJP
Minister of Election	Ram Bilas Sharma	22 July 2016	27 October 2019	BJP
Minister of Science & Technology	Anil Vij	22 July 2016	27 October 2019	BJP
Minister of Public Works (B&R)	Rao Narbir Singh	26 October 2014	27 October 2019	BJP
Minister of Public Health Engineering	Rao Narbir Singh	26 October 2014	27 October 2019	BJP
Minister of Public Health Engineering	Ghanshyam Saraf (Independent Charge)	24 July 2015	22 July 2016	BJP
Minister of Public Health Engineering	Banwari Lal (Independent Charge)	22 July 2016	27 October 2019	BJP
Minister of Architecture	Rao Narbir Singh	22 July 2016	27 October 2019	BJP
Minister of Women & Child Development	Kavita Jain	26 October 2014	27 October 2019	BJP
Minister of SC & BC Welfare	Kavita Jain	26 October 2014	24 July 2015	BJP
Minister of SC & BC Welfare	Krishan Kumar (Independent Charge)	24 July 2015	27 October 2019	BJP
Minister of Urban Local Bodies	Kavita Jain	24 July 2015	27 October 2019	BJP
Minister of Social Justice & Empowerment	Kavita Jain	26 October 2014	22 July 2016	BJP
Minister of Social Justice & Empowerment	Krishan Kumar (Independent Charge)	22 July 2016	27 October 2019	BJP
Minister of Information & Public Relations	Kavita Jain	22 July 2016	5 April 2018	BJP
Minister of Art & Cultural Affairs	Kavita Jain	22 July 2016	9 August 2018	BJP
Minister of Art & Cultural Affairs	Ram Bilas Sharma	9 August 2018	27 October 2019	BJP
Minister of Jails	Krishan Lal Panwar	22 July 2016	27 October 2019	BJP

== Ministers of state ==
Portfolio	Minister	Took office	Left office	Party
Minister of Cooperation (Independent Charge); Minister of Printing & Stationery(Independent Charge)	Bikram Singh Thekedar	26 October 2014	22 July 2016	BJP
Minister of Cooperation (Independent Charge); Minister of Printing & Stationery(Independent Charge)	Manish Grover	22 July 2016	27 October 2019	BJP
Minister of Development & Panchayats	Bikram Singh Thekedar	26 October 2014	24 July 2015	BJP
Minister of Agriculture	Bikram Singh Thekedar	24 July 2015	22 July 2016	BJP
Minister of Urban Local Bodies	Manish Grover	22 July 2016	27 October 2019	BJP
Minister of SC & BC Welfare	Krishan Kumar	26 October 2014	24 July 2015	BJP
Minister of Social Justice & Empowerment; Minister of Women & Child Development	Krishan Kumar	26 October 2014	22 July 2016	BJP
Minister of Food & Supplies	Karan Dev Kamboj	26 October 2014	24 July 2015	BJP
Minister of Transport	Karan Dev Kamboj	26 October 2014	24 July 2015	BJP
Minister of Tourism	Karan Dev Kamboj	26 October 2014	24 July 2015	BJP
Minister of Hospitality	Karan Dev Kamboj	26 October 2014	24 July 2015	BJP
Minister of Forests	Karan Dev Kamboj	24 July 2015	27 October 2019	BJP
Minister of Excise & Taxation	Ghanshyam Saraf	24 July 2015	22 July 2016	BJP
Minister of Mines & Geology	Nayab Singh	24 July 2015	3 June 2019	BJP
Minister of Renewable Energy	Nayab Singh	24 July 2015	22 July 2016	BJP
Minister of Renewable Energy	Banwari Lal	22 July 2016	27 October 2019	BJP

== See also ==
- Second Manohar Lal Khattar ministry
