= Manohar Lal Khattar ministry =

Manohar Lal Khattar ministry may refer to these governments of Haryana, India headed by Manohar Lal Khattar as chief minister:

- First Khattar ministry (2014–2019)
- Second Khattar ministry (2019–2024)
