= Rao Dharampal =

Indian politician (1942–2021)

Dharampal Singh Yadav

Member of the Haryana Legislative Assembly
- Constituency: Badshahpur

Personal details
- Born: 2 April 1942 village Sirhol in Gurgaon
- Died: 26 April 2021 (aged 79)
- Party: Indian National Congress
- Spouse: Vidya Devi
- Children: Virender Yadav, Surander Yadav, Geeta Yadav, Sarita Yadav
- Website: http://raodharampal.com

Dharampal Singh Yadav (2 April 1942 – 26 April 2021) was an Indian politician.

He served as the MLA from Sohna from 1987 to 1996 and 2000 to 2004, before serving as the MLA from Badshahpur from 2009 to 2014 and 2019 until his death in 2021.

He became vice-president of Haryana Pradesh Congress Committee in 1997. A proposal to establish an OBC Cell led by Dharampal was passed with Sonia Gandhi's approval.

== Early life ==
Dharampal Yadav was born in Sirhol, a village in Gurgaon District of South Haryana. His father, Sh. Maha Ram Yadav, was a freedom fighter and had served for years with Sh. Subhash Chandra Bose in Indian National Army.

He completed his Bachelor's degree in Arts and completed a Diploma in Automobiles. He took over the family business and mixed social work with business.

He was jailed with Indira Gandhi in 1978 during the Jail Bharo Andolan.

== Political career ==
His political career started in 1987 when, after he was denied an Assembly position from Sohna by Congress, he contested as an independent against the incumbent and won. However, he joined Congress in 1991 when it offered him the ticket. He participated in Indian general election, 2014 (Haryana) and became part of Gurgaon (Lok Sabha constituency).

== Electoral performance ==
2009 Haryana Legislative Assembly election: Badshahpur
Party	Candidate	Votes	%	±%
INC	Dharampal Yadav	50,557	34.59	New
Independent	Rakesh Daultabad	39,172	26.80	New
INLD	Gopi Chand	25,824	17.67	New
BJP	Mukesh Sharma	15,163	10.37	New
Independent	Bir Singh	7,148	4.89	New
Independent	Man Singh	2,341	1.60	New
BSP	Shiksha Yadav	1,770	1.21	New
HJC(BL)	Beg Raj	1,581	1.08	New
Independent	Subash	811	0.55	New
Margin of victory		11,385	7.79	
Turnout		1,46,156	64.61	
Registered electors		2,26,206		
INC win (new seat)				

== Personal life ==
Dharampal Yadav was married to Smt. Vidya Devi in 1963. They had four children: Virender Yadav, Surander Yadav, Geeta Yadav and Sarita Yadav.

He actively participated in social activities associated with "Indira Gandhi Children holiday Home" at Damdama and was a member of Lions and Rotary Clubs.

He died of COVID-19-related illness in Gurgaon on 26 April 2021 during the COVID-19 pandemic in India.

== Positions held ==
- 1991 – 1992 – Minister of Housing Board (Haryana Govt.)
- 1992 – 1994 – Minister of Animal Husbandry (Haryana Govt.)
- 1994 – 1996 – Minister of Environment & Forest (Haryana Govt.)

== See also ==
- Bhupinder Singh Hooda
- Manmohan Singh
- Sonia Gandhi
- Badshahpur
- Gurgaon
