= Randhir Singh Kapriwas =

Indian politician

Member of Haryana Legislative Assembly
- In office 2014–2019
- Preceded by: Ajay Singh Yadav
- Succeeded by: Chiranjeev Rao
- Constituency: Rewari

Personal details
- Born: Randhir Singh Yadav; 4 April 1946 (age 80) Kapriwas Rewari, India
- Party: Bharatiya Janta Party (2005-2019)
- Children: 2 (sons); 4 (daughters)
- Relatives: Shivtaj Singh Yadav (father)
- Education: Punjab University
- Profession: Politician

Randhir Singh Kapriwas is a former member of the Haryana Legislative Assembly from the Bharatiya Janata Party representing the Rewari constituency in Rewari district of Haryana.
