= Sukhbir Kataria =

Indian politician (born 1964)

MLA, Member 12th of Haryana Legislative Assembly
- In office 2009–2014
- Preceded by: Dharambir
- Succeeded by: Umesh Aggarwal

Personal details
- Born: 9 September 1964 (age 62) Gurgaon
- Citizenship: Indian
- Party: Indian National Congress
- Spouse: Ritu Kataria
- Children: 2
- Occupation: Politician

Sukhbir Kataria is an Indian politician and was a member of Legislative Assembly of Haryana. He won the 2009 Haryana Legislative Assembly election being an independent candidate from Gurgaon Assembly constituency.

== Early life ==
Kataria was born on 9 September 1964 in Gurgaon in the Indian state of Haryana to father Ch. Bhim Singh Kataria.

== Career ==
In 1995, Kataria was elected as a vice-chairman of Block Samiti of Gurgaon, and the Sarpanch of the Gurgaon village in 2000. He also held the post of Municipal Councilor of Gurgaon in 2005.

In 2009, Kataria was elected as an independent candidate from Gurgaon Assembly constituency to the Haryana legislative assembly. He was among the richest candidates in Haryana, with a reported wealth of ₹30 crore. He campaigned on a platform of infrastructure improvements. He was appointed the minister of agriculture and cooperation, and youth and sports.

== Criminal Cases ==
Kataria is accused of forging documents and to provide his relatives and supporters multiple Voter ID cards in 2009 Haryana state assembly election.

On 10 February 2012, he was summoned by the Judicial magistrate to answer the complaint of forgery, cheating, criminal conspiracy and violating Representation of the People's Act, 1950, filed by Umesh Agrawal, a BJP candidate in the 2009 state election. A police case was initially registered on 5 January 2013.

On 14 November 2013, Gurgaon civil court ordered to register a police case against Kataria for providing wrong information in reply to an application submitted through Right to Information Act by Om Prakash Kataria, chief of NGO Matdata Jagrookta Manch. In 2014, a petition was filed against Kataria by Om Prakash Kataria in Haryana district court alleging, he is involved in making of illegal Voter identity cards and Ration cards using fake documents, and demanding registration of a criminal case against him.

On 5 March 2014, the Judicial magistrate of the district court ordered to lodge a police case against Kataria and a case was registered against him in Sector 5 police station, Gurgaon for cheating, faking documents and criminal conspiracy under sections 420, 467, 468, 471 and 120-B of the Indian Penal Code.

On 9 February 2014, the court of Judicial magistrate, Gurgaon ordered to register another police case against Kataria for his alleged involvement in forgery, cheating and criminal conspiracy. It was the number seven police case against Kataria.

== Personal life ==
Kataria married Ritu Kataria in 1990. They have two children, one son and one daughter.

Political offices
Preceded by Dharambir	MLA for Gurgaon; 2009-2014	Succeeded by Umesh Aggarwal
