= Rakesh Daultabad =

Indian politician (died 2024)

MLA
- In office 26 October 2019 – 25 May 2024
- Preceded by: Rao Narbir Singh
- Succeeded by: Rao Narbir Singh
- Constituency: Badshahpur

Personal details
- Born: 1978/1979 Daultabad
- Died: 25 May 2024 (aged 45) Gurugram, Haryana, India
- Party: Independent
- Spouse: Kumudni Rakesh Daultabad
- Children: Milind Rakesh Daultabad, Dev Jangu
- Occupation: Politician
- Profession: Politician

Chaudhary Rakesh Janghu alias Rakesh Daultabad (1978/1979 – 25 May 2024) was an Indian politician. He was elected to the Haryana Legislative Assembly from Badshahpur in the 2019 Haryana Legislative Assembly election as a member and Independent candidate. Daultabad defeated Manish Yadav of Bharatiya Janata Party. Later as an independent MLA he supported Manohar Lal Khattar's and Nayab Singh Saini's governments in Haryana. He was the founder of Parivartan Sangh, an organisation that aims at facilitating healthcare, improving education levels, empowering women and taking several other community initiatives. Improving Badshahpur's educational standards and healthcare and encouraging youth to enter politics are some of the key issues Daultabad focused on. He died from a heart attack at a private hospital in Gurugram, on 25 May 2024, at the age of 45.

== Electoral performance ==
2014 Haryana Legislative Assembly election: Badshahpur
Party	Candidate	Votes	%	±%
BJP	Rao Narbir Singh	86,672	39.82	▲29.44
INLD	Rakesh Daultabad	68,540	31.49	▲13.82
Independent	Mukesh Sharma	35,297	16.22	New
INC	Virender Singh Yadav	10,989	5.05	▼29.54
BSP	Bir Singh	8,433	3.87	▲2.66
Independent	Lakhpat	2,373	1.09	New
Independent	Rakesh Bhardwaj	1,913	0.88	New
NOTA	None of the Above	1,287	0.59	New
Margin of victory		18,132	8.33	▲0.54
Turnout		2,17,676	68.56	▲3.95
Registered electors		3,17,474		▲40.35
BJP gain from INC		Swing	▲5.23	

2019 Haryana Legislative Assembly election: Badshahpur
Party	Candidate	Votes	%	±%
Independent	Rakesh Daultabad	106,827	47.06	New
BJP	Manish Yadav	96,641	42.58	▲2.76
INC	Kamalbir Singh (Mintu)	10,610	4.67	▼0.37
JJP	Rishi Raj Rana	2,964	1.31	New
NOTA	Nota	1,654	0.73	▲0.14
Margin of victory		10,186	4.49	▼3.84
Turnout		2,26,990	57.28	▼11.28
Registered electors		3,96,281		▲24.82
Independent gain from BJP		Swing	▲7.25	
