= Jatusana Assembly constituency =

Constituency of the Haryana legislative assembly in India

Coordinates: 28°20′N 76°33′E

- Former constituency for the Haryana Legislative Assembly

Constituency details
- Country: India
- Region: North India
- State: Haryana
- Established: 1967
- Abolished: 2005
- Total electors: 1,55,198

Jatusana Assembly constituency was an assembly constituency in the India state of Haryana.

== Members of the Legislative Assembly ==
Election	Member	Party
1967	J. Singh	Independent
1968	Rao Birender Singh	Vishal Haryana Party
1972	Maha Singh	Indian National Congress
1977	Rao Inderjit Singh	Vishal Haryana Party
1982	Rao Inderjit Singh	Indian National Congress
1987	Narbir Singh	Lokdal
1991	Rao Inderjit Singh	Indian National Congress
1996	Jagdish Yadav	Haryana Vikas Party
2000	Rao Inderjit Singh	Indian National Congress
2005	Rao Yadavendra Singh	Indian National Congress

== Election results ==
=== Assembly Election 2005 ===
2005 Haryana Legislative Assembly election: Jatusana
Party	Candidate	Votes	%	±%
INC	Rao Yadavendra Singh	39,276	33.80%	▼8.09
INLD	Jagdish Yadav	37,817	32.55%	▼3.51
BJP	Narbir Singh	31,085	26.75%	New
SP	Raghu Yadav	3,824	3.29%	▲2.27
BSP	Balbir Singh	1,025	0.88%	▼12.86
Independent	Narender Kumar	960	0.83%	New
Independent	Comrade Ishwar Singh	636	0.55%	New
BRP	Sunita Devi	536	0.46%	New
LKD	Udham Singh	473	0.41%	New
Margin of victory		1,459	1.26%	▼4.59
Turnout		1,16,194	74.87%	▲8.34
Registered electors		1,55,198		▲6.96
INC hold		Swing	▼8.09	

=== Assembly Election 2000 ===
2000 Haryana Legislative Assembly election: Jatusana
Party	Candidate	Votes	%	±%
INC	Rao Inderjit Singh	40,443	41.89%	▲10.19
INLD	Jagdish Yadav	34,803	36.05%	New
BSP	Rajinder Singh Lodha	13,267	13.74%	▲8.95
Independent	Dr. Dharamvir Yadav	4,032	4.18%	New
HVP	Kuldip Singh	1,229	1.27%	▼40.04
SP	Satyaveer	986	1.02%	New
Independent	Suresh Kumar Khola	817	0.85%	New
Independent	Capt. Ganpat Ram	513	0.53%	New
Margin of victory		5,640	5.84%	▼3.77
Turnout		96,536	66.58%	▲2.28
Registered electors		1,45,101		▲0.87
INC gain from HVP		Swing	▲0.58	

=== Assembly Election 1996 ===
1996 Haryana Legislative Assembly election: Jatusana
Party	Candidate	Votes	%	±%
HVP	Jagdish Yadav	38,185	41.31%	▲14.05
INC	Rao Inderjit Singh	29,304	31.70%	▼16.98
SAP	Rajinder Singh Lodha	16,706	18.07%	New
BSP	Balbir Singh	4,426	4.79%	New
Independent	Omparkash	505	0.55%	New
Independent	Rajender	499	0.54%	New
Margin of victory		8,881	9.61%	▼11.81
Turnout		92,430	66.47%	▲6.69
Registered electors		1,43,852		▲16.49
HVP gain from INC		Swing	▼7.37	

=== Assembly Election 1991 ===
1991 Haryana Legislative Assembly election: Jatusana
Party	Candidate	Votes	%	±%
INC	Rao Inderjit Singh	34,606	48.68%	▲7.16
HVP	Jagdish Yadav	19,380	27.26%	New
JP	Rajinder Singh Lodha	10,356	14.57%	New
BJP	Anang Pal	3,091	4.35%	New
Independent	Sardar Singh	2,010	2.83%	New
Margin of victory		15,226	21.42%	▲9.21
Turnout		71,085	60.66%	▼10.74
Registered electors		1,23,484		▲11.65
INC gain from LKD		Swing	▼5.05	

=== Assembly Election 1987 ===
1987 Haryana Legislative Assembly election: Jatusana
Party	Candidate	Votes	%	±%
LKD	Narbir Singh	40,592	53.73%	▲24.19
INC	Rao Inderjit Singh	31,367	41.52%	▼6.29
Independent	Rajender	1,108	1.47%	New
Independent	Sheotaj Singh	771	1.02%	New
Independent	Kamla Devi	392	0.52%	New
VHP	Yogender	388	0.51%	New
Margin of victory		9,225	12.21%	▼6.06
Turnout		75,548	69.49%	▲5.79
Registered electors		1,10,597		▲14.02
LKD gain from INC		Swing	▲5.92	

=== Assembly Election 1982 ===
1982 Haryana Legislative Assembly election: Jatusana
Party	Candidate	Votes	%	±%
INC	Rao Inderjit Singh	28,994	47.81%	▲33.63
LKD	Maha Singh	17,912	29.54%	New
Independent	Yudhbir Singh	8,263	13.63%	New
Independent	Satyawan	2,549	4.20%	New
Independent	Kamala Devi	861	1.42%	New
Independent	Randhir Singh	658	1.09%	New
Independent	Dharam Singh	579	0.95%	New
Independent	Ajit Singh	455	0.75%	New
Margin of victory		11,082	18.27%	▲7.69
Turnout		60,642	64.05%	▲1.21
Registered electors		96,994		▲18.75
INC gain from VHP		Swing	▲8.28	

=== Assembly Election 1977 ===
1977 Haryana Legislative Assembly election: Jatusana
Party	Candidate	Votes	%	±%
VHP	Rao Inderjit Singh	19,799	39.53%	▼4.06
JP	Raj Singh	14,500	28.95%	New
INC	Maha Singh	7,100	14.18%	▼40.80
Independent	Bansi Dhar	3,445	6.88%	New
Independent	Matadin	3,099	6.19%	New
Independent	Kamla Yadav	628	1.25%	New
Independent	Champadevi	541	1.08%	New
SUCI(C)	Satyawan	523	1.04%	New
Independent	Banwari	446	0.89%	New
Margin of victory		5,299	10.58%	▼0.80
Turnout		50,081	62.34%	▼4.83
Registered electors		81,681		▲18.66
VHP gain from INC		Swing	▼15.44	

=== Assembly Election 1972 ===
1972 Haryana Legislative Assembly election: Jatusana
Party	Candidate	Votes	%	±%
INC	Maha Singh	25,028	54.97%	▲14.89
VHP	Sumitra Devi	19,847	43.59%	▼15.72
Independent	Banwari	653	1.43%	New
Margin of victory		5,181	11.38%	▼7.85
Turnout		45,528	67.76%	▲0.56
Registered electors		68,834		▲12.06
INC gain from VHP		Swing		

=== Assembly Election 1968 ===
1968 Haryana Legislative Assembly election: Jatusana
Party	Candidate	Votes	%	±%
VHP	Rao Birender Singh	23,890	59.31%	New
INC	Nihal Singh	16,144	40.08%	▼3.93
Independent	Chiman Lal	247	0.61%	New
Margin of victory		7,746	19.23%	▲14.76
Turnout		40,281	67.33%	▲1.83
Registered electors		61,425		▲2.94
VHP gain from Independent		Swing		

=== Assembly Election 1967 ===
1967 Haryana Legislative Assembly election: Jatusana
Party	Candidate	Votes	%	±%
Independent	J. Singh	18,443	48.48%	New
INC	N. Singh	16,742	44.01%	New
Independent	Banwari	1,835	4.82%	New
Independent	S. Lal	708	1.86%	New
Independent	S. Lal	312	0.82%	New
Margin of victory		1,701	4.47%	
Turnout		38,040	66.89%	
Registered electors		59,671		
Independent win (new seat)				
