= Bawal Assembly constituency =

Legislative Assembly constituency in Haryana State, India

Coordinates: 28.1°N 76.59°E

Bawal
- Constituency No. 72 for the Haryana Legislative Assembly

Constituency details
- Country: India
- Region: North India
- State: Haryana
- District: Rewari
- Lok Sabha constituency: Gurgaon
- Total electors: 2,31,756
- Reservation: SC

Member of Legislative Assembly
- 15th Haryana Legislative Assembly
- Incumbent Krishan Kumar
- Party: Bharatiya Janata Party
- Elected year: 2024

Bawal is one of the 90 Legislative Assembly constituencies of Haryana state in India.

Located in Rewari district, the constituency is reserved for candidates belonging to the Scheduled Castes.

== Members of the Legislative Assembly ==
Year	Member	Party
1967	Kanhia Lal	Independent
1968	Jee Sukh	Vishal Haryana Party
1972	Ram Prashad	Indian National Congress
1977	Shakuntla Bhagwaria	Janata Party
1982	Shakuntla Bhagwaria	Indian National Congress
1987	Muni Lal	Lokdal
1991	Shakuntla Bhagwaria	Indian National Congress
1996	Jaswant Singh	Haryana Vikas Party
2000	Muni Lal Ranga	Indian National Lok Dal
2005	Shakuntla Bhagwaria	Independent
2009	Rameshwar Dayal Rajoria	Indian National Lok Dal
2014	Banwari Lal	Bharatiya Janata Party
2019	Banwari Lal	Bharatiya Janata Party
2024	Krishan Kumar	Bharatiya Janata Party

== Election results ==
=== Assembly Election 2024 ===
2024 Haryana Legislative Assembly election: Bawal
Party	Candidate	Votes	%	±%
BJP	Dr. Krishan Kumar	86,858	55.28%	▲7.29
INC	Dr. M.L. Ranga	66,847	42.54%	▲16.96
INLD	Sampat Ram Dahanwal	1,440	0.92%	▼1.58
NOTA	None of the Above	483	0.31%	▼0.12
Margin of victory		20,011	12.73%	▼9.67
Turnout		1,57,135	68.57%	▲0.46
Registered electors		2,31,756		▲8.47
BJP hold		Swing	▲7.29	

=== Assembly Election 2019 ===
2019 Haryana Legislative Assembly election: Bawal
Party	Candidate	Votes	%	±%
BJP	Banwari Lal	69,049	47.99%	▼4.87
INC	Muni Lal Ranga	36,804	25.58%	▲16.67
JJP	Shyam Sunder Sabharwal	30,446	21.16%	New
INLD	Sampat Ram Dahanwal	3,589	2.49%	▼23.21
BSP	Machhander Rai	1,637	1.14%	▲0.06
Margin of victory		32,245	22.41%	▼4.74
Turnout		1,43,893	68.10%	▼5.04
Registered electors		2,11,284		▲12.22
BJP hold		Swing	▼4.87	

=== Assembly Election 2014 ===
2014 Haryana Legislative Assembly election: Bawal
Party	Candidate	Votes	%	±%
BJP	Banwari Lal	72,792	52.86%	▲43.52
INLD	Shyam Sunder	35,401	25.71%	▼27.52
INC	Jaswant Singh	12,272	8.91%	▼24.29
Independent	Neelam Bhagwaria Chander	10,211	7.41%	New
BSP	Rajwanti	1,487	1.08%	▲0.00
Independent	Raj Singh	1,445	1.05%	New
Independent	Lekh Ram Mehra	879	0.64%	New
Margin of victory		37,391	27.15%	▲7.13
Turnout		1,37,714	73.14%	▲6.58
Registered electors		1,88,276		▲14.07
BJP gain from INLD		Swing	▼0.37	

=== Assembly Election 2009 ===
2009 Haryana Legislative Assembly election: Bawal
Party	Candidate	Votes	%	±%
INLD	Rameshwar Dayal Rajoria	58,473	53.22%	▲31.86
INC	Shakuntla Bhagwaria	36,472	33.20%	▲0.46
BJP	Jawahar Lal	10,258	9.34%	▲2.12
BSP	Zile Ram	1,181	1.07%	▼0.16
HJC(BL)	Sanjay	980	0.89%	New
Independent	Sunder Lal	859	0.78%	New
SP	Jagdish	801	0.73%	New
Margin of victory		22,001	20.03%	▲17.11
Turnout		1,09,863	66.57%	▼5.27
Registered electors		1,65,046		▲10.80
INLD gain from Independent		Swing	▲17.57	

=== Assembly Election 2005 ===
2005 Haryana Legislative Assembly election: Bawal
Party	Candidate	Votes	%	±%
Independent	Shakuntla Bhagwaria	38,153	35.66%	New
INC	Bharat Singh S/O Surjan	35,032	32.74%	▼5.60
INLD	Muni Lal Ranga	22,853	21.36%	▼38.48
BJP	Jaswant Singh	7,721	7.22%	New
BSP	Lalita Bharti	1,318	1.23%	▲0.51
LJP	Ramesh Thekedar	795	0.74%	New
Independent	Lachhi Ram	599	0.56%	New
Margin of victory		3,121	2.92%	▼18.58
Turnout		1,06,996	71.83%	▲4.76
Registered electors		1,48,953		▲13.82
Independent gain from INLD		Swing	▼24.18	

=== Assembly Election 2000 ===
2000 Haryana Legislative Assembly election: Bawal
Party	Candidate	Votes	%	±%
INLD	Muni Lal Ranga	52,524	59.84%	New
INC	Shakuntla Bhagwaria	33,652	38.34%	▲9.05
BSP	Chhater Singh Nimwal	632	0.72%	▼4.60
Margin of victory		18,872	21.50%	▲3.18
Turnout		87,772	67.69%	▲5.59
Registered electors		1,30,869		▼1.72
INLD gain from HVP		Swing		

=== Assembly Election 1996 ===
1996 Haryana Legislative Assembly election: Bawal
Party	Candidate	Votes	%	±%
HVP	Jaswant Singh	38,973	47.61%	▲38.86
INC	Shakuntla Bhagwaria	23,974	29.29%	▼18.09
SAP	Ved Parkash Bawalia	6,424	7.85%	New
SP	Rameshwar Dayal Rajoria	5,793	7.08%	New
BSP	Krishan Kumar Bagri	4,358	5.32%	New
AIIC(T)	Dinesh Singh	659	0.81%	New
JD	Lachi Ram	555	0.68%	New
Margin of victory		14,999	18.32%	▲3.72
Turnout		81,863	63.71%	▲4.57
Registered electors		1,33,153		▲13.60
HVP gain from INC		Swing	▲0.23	

=== Assembly Election 1991 ===
1991 Haryana Legislative Assembly election: Bawal
Party	Candidate	Votes	%	±%
INC	Shakuntla Bhagwaria	31,605	47.38%	▲19.84
JP	Hargi Ram Bhagotia	21,864	32.78%	New
HVP	Jaswant Singh	5,837	8.75%	New
BJP	Ram Niwas	3,073	4.61%	New
Independent	Ram Sarup	1,866	2.80%	New
Independent	Sher Singh	413	0.62%	New
Margin of victory		9,741	14.60%	▲7.75
Turnout		66,708	58.78%	▼6.55
Registered electors		1,17,211		▲10.86
INC gain from LKD		Swing	▲9.05	

=== Assembly Election 1987 ===
1987 Haryana Legislative Assembly election: Bawal
Party	Candidate	Votes	%	±%
LKD	Muni Lal	25,717	38.33%	▲11.80
Independent	Shakuntla Bhagwaria	21,117	31.47%	New
INC	Rameshwar Dayal Rajoria	18,476	27.53%	▼31.67
Independent	Chander Parkash	596	0.89%	New
VHP	Parbhati Ram	473	0.70%	New
Independent	Umrao	409	0.61%	New
Margin of victory		4,600	6.86%	▼25.83
Turnout		67,101	64.48%	▲0.83
Registered electors		1,05,730		▲16.93
LKD gain from INC		Swing	▼20.88	

=== Assembly Election 1982 ===
1982 Haryana Legislative Assembly election: Bawal
Party	Candidate	Votes	%	±%
INC	Shakuntla Bhagwaria	33,534	59.21%	▲52.20
LKD	Murari Lal	15,022	26.52%	New
Independent	Kanhia Lal	5,242	9.26%	New
Independent	Mohan Lal	913	1.61%	New
JP	Chander Parkash	805	1.42%	▼45.04
Independent	Puran Chand	565	1.00%	New
Independent	Shri Ram	363	0.64%	New
Margin of victory		18,512	32.69%	▲24.79
Turnout		56,637	63.89%	▲5.50
Registered electors		90,423		▲16.32
INC gain from JP		Swing	▲12.75	

=== Assembly Election 1977 ===
1977 Haryana Legislative Assembly election: Bawal
Party	Candidate	Votes	%	±%
JP	Shakuntla Bhagwaria	20,637	46.46%	New
VHP	Mohan Lal	17,128	38.56%	▼1.78
INC	Ram Parshad	3,111	7.00%	▼52.66
Independent	Mani Lal	952	2.14%	New
Independent	Manohar	777	1.75%	New
Independent	Jai Sukh Lal	715	1.61%	New
Independent	Surat Singh	603	1.36%	New
Independent	Mangal Ram	445	1.00%	New
Margin of victory		3,509	7.90%	▼11.42
Turnout		44,419	57.99%	▼7.64
Registered electors		77,737		▲29.17
JP gain from INC		Swing	▼13.20	

=== Assembly Election 1972 ===
1972 Haryana Legislative Assembly election: Bawal
Party	Candidate	Votes	%	±%
INC	Ram Prashad	23,259	59.66%	▲26.00
VHP	Kanhia Lal	15,727	40.34%	▼10.87
Margin of victory		7,532	19.32%	▲1.77
Turnout		38,986	66.72%	▲13.31
Registered electors		60,184		
INC gain from VHP		Swing		

=== Assembly Election 1968 ===
1968 Haryana Legislative Assembly election: Bawal
Party	Candidate	Votes	%	±%
VHP	Jee Sukh	14,141	51.21%	New
INC	Hira Lal	9,295	33.66%	▲7.81
SWA	Ram Parshad	4,176	15.12%	New
Margin of victory		4,846	17.55%	▲15.83
Turnout		27,612	53.28%	▼2.16
Registered electors		53,645		▲1.69
VHP gain from Independent		Swing		

=== Assembly Election 1967 ===
1967 Haryana Legislative Assembly election: Bawal
Party	Candidate	Votes	%	±%
Independent	Kanhia Lal	8,227	29.08%	New
Independent	R. Parshad	7,739	27.35%	New
INC	Hira Lal	7,314	25.85%	New
Independent	M. Ram	1,816	6.42%	New
Independent	S. Ram	1,083	3.83%	New
Independent	M. Lal	889	3.14%	New
ABJS	B. Sen	806	2.85%	New
Independent	Badri	421	1.49%	New
Margin of victory		488	1.72%	
Turnout		28,295	58.12%	
Registered electors		52,755		
Independent win (new seat)				

== See also ==
- List of constituencies of the Haryana Legislative Assembly
- Rewari district
