= Sudhir Singla =

Indian politician

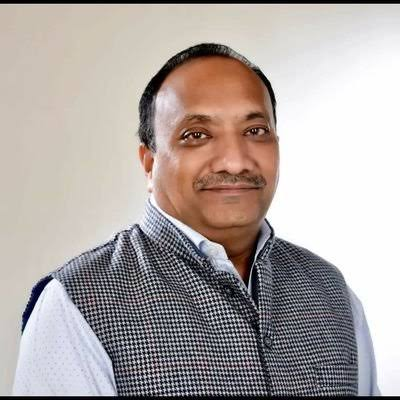

Member of the Haryana Legislative Assembly
- In office 24 October 2019 – 8 October 2024
- Preceded by: Umesh Aggarwal
- Succeeded by: Mukesh Sharma
- Constituency: Gurgaon

Personal details
- Born: 13 October 1965 (age 60)
- Party: Bharatiya Janata Party
- Spouse: Mrs. Sunita Singla
- Children: Vivek Singla; Divya Singla
- Parents: Sita Ram Singla (father); Kamla Devi (mother)
- Education: LLB, Meerut University
- Occupation: Politician

Sudhir Singla (born 13 October 1965) is an Indian politician. He was elected to the Haryana Legislative Assembly from Gurgaon in the 2019 Haryana Legislative Assembly election as a member of the Bharatiya Janata Party.

== Family ==
Sudhir's father Late Sh. Sita Ram Singla, joined R.S.S. and thereafter, he started rendering his services at grass root level in B.J.P. and held the post of Vice President, B.J.P. Haryana. He was also President of Haryana B.J.P. Disciplinary committee. In the year 1975, due to the emergency he went to jail by invoking Satyagraha. In 1987, he contested assembly election from Gurgaon assembly seat and held the post of MoS and remained as Sports Minister, I.T.I. minister and also remained as Chairman, Khadi Gram Udyog. In year 1996, in coalition government with H.V.P., he remained as Chairman of Haryana bureau of enterprises. He belongs to village Mozabad. In year 2016, in the same village, government in its own campus, started functioning I.T.I.

== Early life and education ==
Sudhir was born on 13 October 1965. He is married to Mrs. Sunita Singla. He was the member of ABVP in his college days. He has two children, Vivek and Divya Singla. He completed his LLB from Meerut University.

== Career ==
Sudhir is also member of executive committee of Aggarwal Dharamshala, Gurugram. He is holding post of District Vice President, B.J.P., Gurugram. He has been practicing civil law since year 1994 at District Courts, Gurugram. He is a MLA and a well respected person in Gurugam.
