= Second Khattar ministry =

Government of Haryana, India, 2019–2024

- Ministry of the State of Haryana
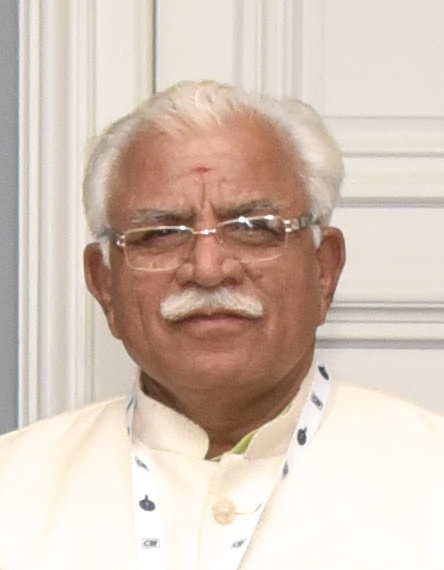
- Hon'ble Chief Minister of Haryana
- Date formed: 27 October 2019
- Date dissolved: 12 March 2024

People and organisations
- Head of state: Governor; Bandaru Dattatreya
- Head of government: Manohar Lal Khattar
- Deputy head of government: Dushyant Chautala
- Total no. of members: 12
- Member parties: Bhartiya Janata Party; Jannayak Janta Party; Independent
- Status in legislature: Coalition
- Opposition party: Indian National Congress
- Opposition leader: Bhupinder Singh Hooda

History
- Election: 2019
- Predecessor: First Khattar ministry
- Successor: First Saini ministry

Second Manohar Lal Khattar ministry was the Council of Ministers in Haryana, a state in North India headed by Manohar Lal Khattar of the BJP from 27 October 2019.

In the government, the Chief Minister was the leader of the BJP, while the Deputy Chief Minister from the JJP. Here is the list of ministers

== Council of Ministers ==
Portfolio	Minister	Took office	Left office	Party
Chief Minister; Finance; Town & Country Planning and Urban Estates; Public Health Engineering; Irrigation and Water Resources; Information Technology; Electronics and Communication; Information; Public Relations & Languages; Planning; Administration of Justice; Environment & Climate Change; Architecture; *General Administration; Criminal Investigation (CID); Personnel & Training; Raj Bhawan Affairs; Other departments not allocated to any Minister	Manohar Lal Khattar	27 October 2019	12 March 2024	BJP
Deputy Chief Minister; Revenue and Disaster Management; Excise and Taxation; Industries and Commerce; Public Works (B&R); Food, Civil Supplies and Consumer Affairs; Labour and Employment; Civil Aviation; Rehabilitation; Consolidation	Dushyant Chautala	27 October 2019	12 March 2024	JJP
Minister of Home; Minister of Urban Local Bodies; Minister of Health; Minister of Medical Education & Research; Minister of AYUSH; Minister of Technical Education; Minister of Science and Technology.	Anil Vij	15 November 2019	12 March 2024	BJP
Minister of Education; Minister of Forests; Minister of Tourism; Minister of Parliamentary Affairs; Minister of Hospitality; Minister of Art and Cultural affairs	Kanwar Pal Gujjar	15 November 2019	12 March 2024	BJP
Minister of Transport; Minister of Mines and Geology; Minister of Skill development and Industry Training	Mool Chand Sharma	15 November 2019	12 March 2024	BJP
Minister of Power; Minister of New and Renewable energy Minister of Jails	Ranjit Singh Chautala	15 November 2019	12 March 2024	Independent
Minister of Agriculture and Farmers Welfare; MInister of Animal Husbandry and Dairying; Minister of Fisheries; Minister of Law & Legislation	Jai Parkash Dalal	15 November 2019	12 March 2024	BJP
Minister of Cooperation; Minister of Welfare of SCs and BCs	Banwari Lal	15 November 2019	12 March 2024	BJP
Urban Local Bodies; Housing for all	Kamal Gupta	28 December 2021	12 March 2024	BJP
Development and Panchayats; Archaeology	Devender Singh Babli	28 December 2021	12 March 2024	JJP

== Ministers of state ==
Portfolio	Minister	Took office	Left office	Party
Minister of Social justice and Empowerment; Minister of Sainik and Ardh Sainik Welfare (Independent Charge)	Om Parkash Yadav	15 November 2019	12 March 2024	BJP
Minister of Women and Child Development (Independent Charge)	Kamlesh Dhanda	15 November 2019	12 March 2024	BJP
Minister of Archaeology and Museums (Independent Charge); Minister of Labour and Employment (Attached with the Deputy Chief Minister)	Anoop Dhanak	15 November 2019	12 March 2024	JJP
Minister of Sports and Youth Affairs; Minister of Printing and Stationery (Independent Charge)	Sandeep Singh	15 November 2019	1 January 2023	BJP
