= Rao Narbir Singh =

Indian politician

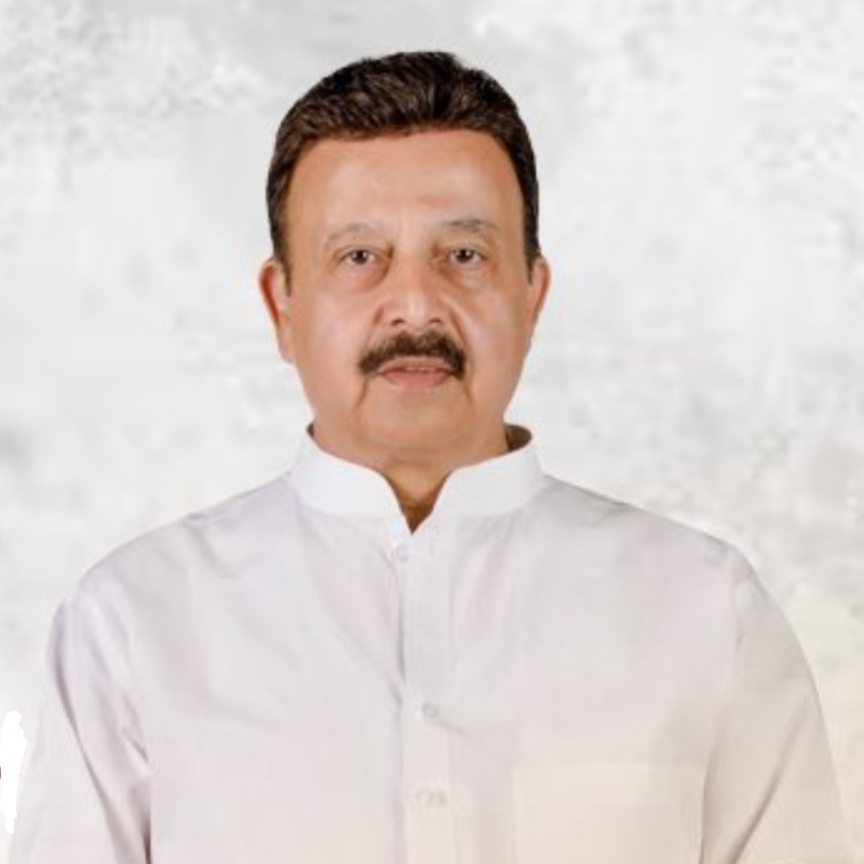

Minister of Industries and Commerce, Government of Haryana
- Incumbent
- Assumed office 17 October 2024
- Chief Minister: Nayab Singh Saini
- Preceded by: Mool Chand Sharma

Minister of Environment & Forest, Government of Haryana
- Incumbent
- Assumed office 17 October 2024
- Chief Minister: Nayab Singh Saini
- Preceded by: Sanjay Singh

Minister of Public Works Department, Government of Haryana
- In office 26 October 2014 – 27 October 2019
- Chief Minister: Manohar Lal Khattar
- Succeeded by: Dushyant Chautala

Minister of Public Health Engineering, Government of Haryana
- In office 26 October 2014 – 27 October 2019
- Chief Minister: Manohar Lal Khattar
- Succeeded by: Manohar Lal Khattar

Member of Haryana Legislative Assembly
- Incumbent
- Assumed office 2024
- Preceded by: Rakesh Daultabad
- Constituency: Badshahpur Assembly constituency
- In office 2014–2019
- Preceded by: Rao Dharampal
- Succeeded by: Rakesh Daultabad
- Constituency: Badshahpur Assembly constituency
- In office 1996–2000
- Preceded by: Rao Dharampal
- Succeeded by: Rao Dharampal
- Constituency: Sohna Assembly constituency
- In office 1987–1991
- Preceded by: Rao Inderjit Singh
- Succeeded by: Rao Inderjit Singh
- Constituency: Jatusana Assembly constituency

Personal details
- Born: 2 April 1961 (age 65) Gurgaon, Haryana, India
- Party: Bharatiya Janata Party
- Other political affiliations: Indian National Congress; Haryana Janhit Congress (BL); Haryana Vikas Party; Lok Dal; Bahujan Samaj Party
- Spouse: Anita Singh
- Children: 2
- Occupation: Politician; social worker; agriculturist
- Website: raonarbirsingh.in

Rao Narbir Singh is an Indian politician of the Bharatiya Janata Party, MLA from Badshahpur Assembly constituency of 2024-2029 Haryana Legislative Assembly, and holds 4 ministeries in 2024-29 Government of Haryana, namely the Ministry of Industries and Commerce, Environment, Foreign Cooperation, and Sainik Welfare. Exemplifying Aaya Ram Gaya Ram style of politics, he has been member of 6 different parties and switched parties at least 6 times. He is also a political dynast as his father late Mahavir Singh Yadav was a former Cabinet Minister in the State of Haryana and grandfather late Rao Mohar Singh Yadav also served as an M.L.C. in pre-partition Punjab in 1942.

He was denied ticket to contest 2019 election and hence was not a MLA during 2019-24 period. Earlier, from 2014 to 2019, he was Cabinet Minister in Government of Haryana for the Department of Public Works (B&R) and Department of Public Health Engineering (Water Supply and Sanitation).

== Early life ==
Singh was born in Gurgaon on 2 April 1961. He is a grandson of Mohar Singh Yadav who was an M.L.C. in Punjab state before partition of India and Pakistan in 1942. His father Mahavir Singh Yadav was also a former cabinet Minister in the State of Haryana.

== Political career ==
He has successfully contested Legislative elections from Jatusana (Haryana) in 1987 and Sohna (Haryana) in 1996. He has previously held the portfolios of State Home Minister in 1987 and Transport, Food & Supply and Cooperation Minister in 1996 in the Government of Haryana. He became the youngest elected representative in the country to hold the office of State Home Ministry at age 26. He also had additional charge of Sports and Printing & Stationery ministry in 1996. He unsuccessfully contested Lok Sabha election from Gurgaon in 2009.

== Electoral record ==
Year	Election	Party	Constituency Name	Result
1987	7th Haryana Assembly	Lok Dal	Jatusana	Won
1991	8th Haryana Assembly	Indian National Congress	Salhawas	Lost
1996	9th Haryana Assembly	Haryana Vikas Party	Sohna	Won
2000	10th Haryana Assembly	Bahujan Samaj Party	Gurgaon	Lost
2005	11th Haryana Assembly	Bharatiya Janata Party	Jatusana	Lost
2009	15th Lok Sabha	Haryana Janhit Congress (BL)	Gurgaon	Lost
2014	13th Haryana Assembly	Bharatiya Janata Party	Badshahpur	Won
2024	15th Haryana Assembly	Bharatiya Janata Party	Badshahpur	Won

== Career graph ==
- 1982 – Director, Central Cooperative Bank, Gurgaon
- 1983 – Sarpanch, Village Gairatpur Bass
- 1984 – chairman, Market Committee, Sohna
- 1987 – MLA (Jatusana constituency)
- 1987 – State Home Minister, Government of Haryana youngest minister at age of 25? which is record and holds till now
- 1996 – MLA (Sohna constituency)
- 1996 – Food & Civil Supplies, Transport and Cooperative Minister, Government of Haryana
- 2014 onward – chairman, Rao Mohar Singh College of Education, Behrampur
- 2014 onward - Vice-president, BJP Haryana.
- 2014 - Cabinet Minister, Government of Haryana for Department of Public Works (B&R), Haryana Official website and Department of Public Health Engineering (Water Supply and Sanitation), Haryana
