= Badshahpur Assembly constituency =

Constituency of the Haryana legislative assembly in India

Coordinates: 28.398°N 77.054°E

- Constituency No. 76 for the Haryana Legislative Assembly

Constituency details
- Country: India
- Region: North India
- State: Haryana
- Division: Gurgaon
- District: Gurgaon
- Lok Sabha constituency: Gurgaon
- Total electors: 5,13,878
- Reservation: None

Member of Legislative Assembly
- 15th Haryana Legislative Assembly
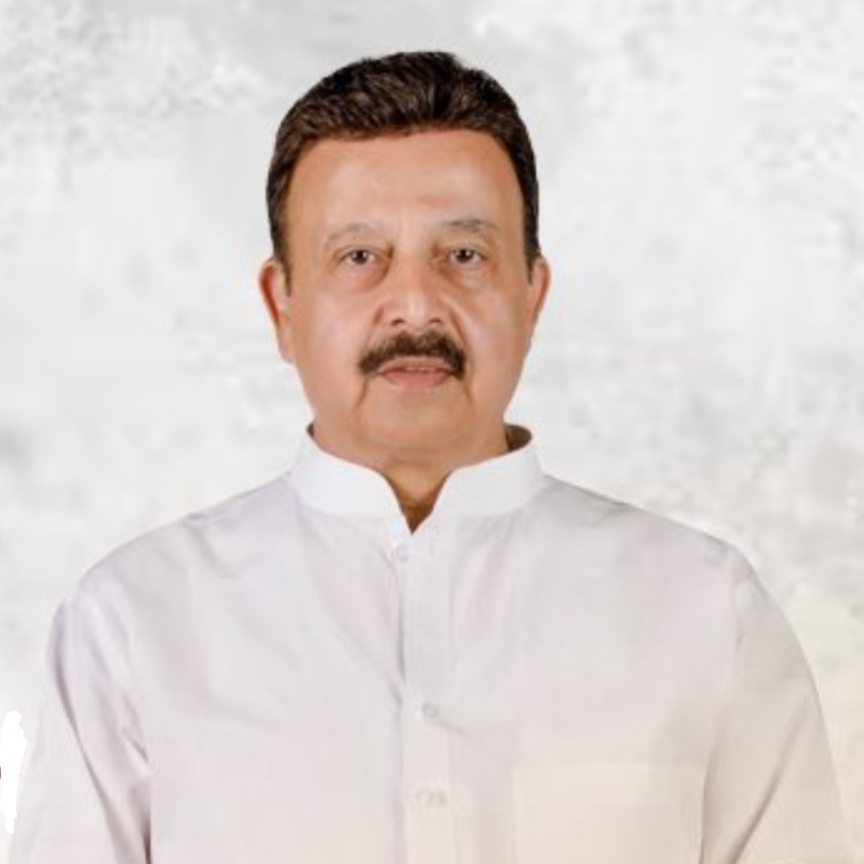
- Incumbent Rao Narbir Singh
- Party: BJP
- Elected year: 2024

Badshahpur Assembly constituency is one of the 90 constituencies in the Legislative Assembly of Haryana, a northern state of India. It is a part of Gurgaon Lok Sabha constituency.

== Members of the Legislative Assembly ==
Year	Member	Party
Till 2009: Constituency did not exist
2009	Rao Dharmapal Singh	Indian National Congress
2014	Rao Narbir Singh	Bharatiya Janata Party
2019	Ch. Rakesh Daultabad	Independent
2024	Rao Narbir Singh	Bharatiya Janata Party

== Election results ==
=== Assembly Election 2024 ===
2024 Haryana Legislative Assembly election: Badshahpur
Party	Candidate	Votes	%	±%
BJP	Rao Narbir Singh	145,503	51.54	▲8.97
INC	Vardhan Yadav	84,798	30.04	▲25.37
Independent	Kumudni Rakesh Daultabad	30,885	10.94	New
AAP	Bir Singh Biru Sarpanch	12,943	4.59	New
SUCI(C)	Comrade Balwan Singh	3,038	1.08	New
BSP	Joginder Singh	1,561	0.55	▼0.12
NOTA	None of the Above	1,803	0.64	▼0.09
Margin of victory		60,705	21.50	▲17.02
Turnout		2,82,285	54.19	▼3.09
Registered electors		5,13,878		▲31.46
BJP gain from Independent		Swing	▲4.48	

=== Assembly Election 2019 ===
2019 Haryana Legislative Assembly election: Badshahpur
Party	Candidate	Votes	%	±%
Independent	Rakesh Daultabad	106,827	47.06	New
BJP	Manish Yadav	96,641	42.58	▲2.76
INC	Kamalbir Singh (Mintu)	10,610	4.67	▼0.37
JJP	Rishi Raj Rana	2,964	1.31	New
NOTA	Nota	1,654	0.73	▲0.14
Margin of victory		10,186	4.49	▼3.84
Turnout		2,26,990	57.28	▼11.28
Registered electors		3,96,281		▲24.82
Independent gain from BJP		Swing	▲7.25	

=== Assembly Election 2014 ===
2014 Haryana Legislative Assembly election: Badshahpur
Party	Candidate	Votes	%	±%
BJP	Rao Narbir Singh	86,672	39.82	▲29.44
INLD	Rakesh Daultabad	68,540	31.49	▲13.82
Independent	Mukesh Sharma	35,297	16.22	New
INC	Virender Singh Yadav	10,989	5.05	▼29.54
BSP	Bir Singh	8,433	3.87	▲2.66
Independent	Lakhpat	2,373	1.09	New
Independent	Rakesh Bhardwaj	1,913	0.88	New
NOTA	None of the Above	1,287	0.59	New
Margin of victory		18,132	8.33	▲0.54
Turnout		2,17,676	68.56	▲3.95
Registered electors		3,17,474		▲40.35
BJP gain from INC		Swing	▲5.23	

=== Assembly Election 2009 ===
2009 Haryana Legislative Assembly election: Badshahpur
Party	Candidate	Votes	%	±%
INC	Dharampal Yadav	50,557	34.59	New
Independent	Rakesh Daultabad	39,172	26.80	New
INLD	Gopi Chand	25,824	17.67	New
BJP	Mukesh Sharma	15,163	10.37	New
Independent	Bir Singh	7,148	4.89	New
Independent	Man Singh	2,341	1.60	New
BSP	Shiksha Yadav	1,770	1.21	New
HJC(BL)	Beg Raj	1,581	1.08	New
Independent	Subash	811	0.55	New
Margin of victory		11,385	7.79	
Turnout		1,46,156	64.61	
Registered electors		2,26,206		
INC win (new seat)				
