= Rewari Assembly constituency =

Constituency of the Haryana legislative assembly in India

Coordinates: 28.20°N 76.61°E

- Constituency No. 74 for the Haryana Legislative Assembly

Constituency details
- Country: India
- Region: North India
- State: Haryana
- District: Rewari
- Lok Sabha constituency: Gurgaon
- Established: 1967
- Total electors: 2,53,367
- Reservation: None

Member of Legislative Assembly
- 15th Haryana Legislative Assembly
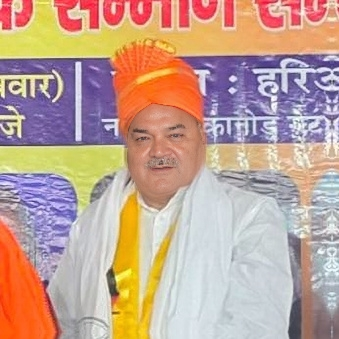
- Incumbent Laxman Singh Yadav
- Party: BJP
- Elected year: 2024

Rewari Assembly constituency is one of the 90 Vidhan Sabha constituencies in Haryana state in northern India. It comes under Gurgaon Lok Sabha constituency.

== Members of Legislative Assembly ==
Year	Member	Party
1967	Sumitra Devi Yadav	Indian National Congress
1968	Sumitra Devi Yadav	Vishal Haryana Party
1972	Rao Abhey Singh	Indian National Congress
1977	Rao Ram Singh	Janata Party
1982	Rao Ram Singh	Independent
1987	Raghu Yadav	Lokdal
1991	Ajay Singh Yadav	Indian National Congress
1996	Ajay Singh Yadav	Indian National Congress
2000	Ajay Singh Yadav	Indian National Congress
2005	Ajay Singh Yadav	Indian National Congress
2009	Ajay Singh Yadav	Indian National Congress
2014	Rao Randhir Kapriwas	Bharatiya Janata Party
2019	Chiranjeev Rao	Indian National Congress
2024	Laxman Singh Yadav	Bharatiya Janata Party

== Election results ==
=== Assembly Election 2024 ===
2024 Haryana Legislative Assembly election: Rewari
Party	Candidate	Votes	%	±%
BJP	Laxman Singh Yadav	83,747	49.95	▲22.96
INC	Chiranjeev Rao	54,978	32.79	▲4.97
AAP	Satish Yadav	18,427	10.99	New
Independent	Prashant Sunny Yadav	7,787	4.64	New
NOTA	None of the Above	665	0.40	▼0.10
Margin of victory		28,769	17.16	▲16.32
Turnout		1,67,667	66.04	▼0.91
Registered electors		2,53,367		▲7.81
BJP gain from INC		Swing	▲22.12	

=== Assembly Election 2019 ===
2019 Haryana Legislative Assembly election: Rewari
Party	Candidate	Votes	%	±%
INC	Chiranjeev Rao	43,870	27.82	▲7.29
BJP	Sunil Kumar	42,553	26.99	▼25.93
Independent	Randhir Singh Kapriwas	36,778	23.33	New
Independent	Prashant Sunny Yadav	22,104	14.02	New
JJP	Malkhan Singh	3,826	2.43	New
BSP	Pritam Jangid	2,455	1.56	▲0.70
Swaraj India	Manju Bala	1,197	0.76	New
LSP	Chander Shekhar Saini	1,089	0.69	New
Independent	Somany Vijay	911	0.58	New
Margin of victory		1,317	0.84	▼28.83
Turnout		1,57,668	66.95	▼8.23
Registered electors		2,35,494		▲15.52
INC gain from BJP		Swing	▼25.09	

=== Assembly Election 2014 ===
2014 Haryana Legislative Assembly election: Rewari
Party	Candidate	Votes	%	±%
BJP	Randhir Singh Kapriwas	81,103	52.92	▲32.66
INLD	Satish Yadav	35,637	23.25	▲20.57
INC	Ajay Singh Yadav	31,471	20.53	▼19.78
BSP	Pritam Kumar	1,312	0.86	▼4.47
HJC(BL)	Raghu Yadav	935	0.61	▼0.36
Independent	Vijay Somany	784	0.51	New
Margin of victory		45,466	29.66	▲18.63
Turnout		1,53,268	75.18	▲2.49
Registered electors		2,03,862		▲23.04
BJP gain from INC		Swing	▲12.60	

=== Assembly Election 2009 ===
2009 Haryana Legislative Assembly election: Rewari
Party	Candidate	Votes	%	±%
INC	Ajay Singh Yadav	48,557	40.31	▼4.40
Independent	Satish S/O Roshan Lal	35,269	29.28	New
BJP	Randhir Singh Kapriwas	24,396	20.25	▼12.78
BSP	Vijay Somany	6,418	5.33	▲2.58
INLD	Anil Kumar	3,225	2.68	▼2.66
HJC(BL)	Rajinder Singh	1,164	0.97	New
Margin of victory		13,288	11.03	▼0.65
Turnout		1,20,446	72.69	▼1.07
Registered electors		1,65,691		▲11.72
INC hold		Swing	▼4.40	

=== Assembly Election 2005 ===
2005 Haryana Legislative Assembly election: Rewari
Party	Candidate	Votes	%	±%
INC	Ajay Singh Yadav	48,924	44.72	▲15.75
BJP	Randhir Singh Kapriwas	36,145	33.04	▲23.02
Independent	Vijay Somany	12,140	11.10	New
INLD	Thekedar Rajinder Singh	5,840	5.34	New
BSP	Manjeet	3,003	2.74	New
Independent	Sudesh	969	0.89	New
Independent	Rohtash	574	0.52	New
Margin of victory		12,779	11.68	▲6.20
Turnout		1,09,404	73.77	▲6.89
Registered electors		1,48,312		▲10.34
INC hold		Swing	▲15.75	

=== Assembly Election 2000 ===
2000 Haryana Legislative Assembly election: Rewari
Party	Candidate	Votes	%	±%
INC	Ajay Singh Yadav	26,036	28.96	▲2.27
Independent	Vijay Somani	21,112	23.49	New
Independent	Randhir Singh Kapriwas	20,016	22.27	New
Independent	Rajender Singh	10,167	11.31	New
BJP	Shiv Rattan Singh	9,006	10.02	▼12.41
Independent	Hirdey Ram	1,266	1.41	New
Independent	Ashok Gulati	624	0.69	New
HVP	Sheo Lal	542	0.60	New
Independent	Radhey Shyam	536	0.60	New
Margin of victory		4,924	5.48	▲3.34
Turnout		89,890	66.90	▲4.33
Registered electors		1,34,414		▲1.56
INC hold		Swing	▲2.27	

=== Assembly Election 1996 ===
1996 Haryana Legislative Assembly election: Rewari
Party	Candidate	Votes	%	±%
INC	Ajay Singh Yadav	22,099	26.70	▼26.08
Independent	Randhir Singh Kapriwas	20,332	24.56	New
BJP	Sharda	18,566	22.43	▲10.82
BSP	Ishwar Yadav	7,362	8.89	New
SP	Master Brinder Singh	5,943	7.18	New
SAP	Sunil Rao	2,705	3.27	New
Independent	Shri Ram Sambharya	2,004	2.42	New
AIIC(T)	K . R. Khurana	1,262	1.52	New
Akhil Bharatiya Jan Sangh	Jagdish Sharma	472	0.57	New
Margin of victory		1,767	2.13	▼38.05
Turnout		82,779	65.55	▲4.69
Registered electors		1,32,344		▲19.14
INC hold		Swing	▼26.08	

=== Assembly Election 1991 ===
1991 Haryana Legislative Assembly election: Rewari
Party	Candidate	Votes	%	±%
INC	Ajay Singh Yadav	33,922	52.78	▲29.36
HVP	Rajinder Singh	8,098	12.60	New
BJP	Shiv Rattan Singh	7,463	11.61	New
Independent	Inderpal	5,092	7.92	New
Sarvajati Janta Panchayat	Mittar Sain	4,198	6.53	New
LKD	Jaggan Singh	1,758	2.74	▼52.64
Independent	Jai Singh	931	1.45	New
Jawan Kisan Mazdur Party	Chiranji S/O Mam Chand	655	1.02	New
Doordarshi Party	Lal Chand	432	0.67	New
Independent	Joginder	367	0.57	New
Margin of victory		25,824	40.18	▲8.23
Turnout		64,269	59.98	▼12.01
Registered electors		1,11,081		▲11.06
INC gain from LKD		Swing	▼2.59	

=== Assembly Election 1987 ===
1987 Haryana Legislative Assembly election: Rewari
Party	Candidate	Votes	%	±%
LKD	Raghu Yadav	38,694	55.38	New
INC	Hukam Chand	16,368	23.42	▼15.47
Independent	Ram Singh	11,214	16.05	New
Independent	Sheo Lal	1,010	1.45	New
Independent	Ram Singh	369	0.53	New
Margin of victory		22,326	31.95	▲17.62
Turnout		69,876	70.93	▼2.11
Registered electors		1,00,018		▲18.34
LKD gain from Independent		Swing	▲2.15	

=== Assembly Election 1982 ===
1982 Haryana Legislative Assembly election: Rewari
Party	Candidate	Votes	%	±%
Independent	Ram Singh	32,378	53.22	New
INC	Sumitra Devi	23,662	38.90	▲31.72
JP	Raghu Yadav	3,121	5.13	▼39.28
BJP	Mahabir Singh	1,017	1.67	New
Independent	Ved Prakash	657	1.08	New
Margin of victory		8,716	14.33	▲14.13
Turnout		60,835	73.07	▲8.98
Registered electors		84,519		▲20.87
Independent gain from JP		Swing	▲8.81	

=== Assembly Election 1977 ===
1977 Haryana Legislative Assembly election: Rewari
Party	Candidate	Votes	%	±%
JP	Ram Singh	19,563	44.41	New
VHP	Shiv Rattan Singh	19,477	44.22	▲0.25
INC	Prem Swaroop	3,161	7.18	▼38.61
Independent	Hardayal	598	1.36	New
Independent	Kishan Chand	439	1.00	New
Independent	Lal Singh	358	0.81	New
Independent	Ladli Prasad	352	0.80	New
Margin of victory		86	0.20	▼1.63
Turnout		44,050	63.69	▼6.27
Registered electors		69,927		▲27.54
JP gain from INC		Swing	▼1.38	

=== Assembly Election 1972 ===
1972 Haryana Legislative Assembly election: Rewari
Party	Candidate	Votes	%	±%
INC	Abhai Singh	17,389	45.79	▲7.36
VHP	Shoe Raj Singh	16,696	43.97	▼5.22
Independent	Babu Dayal	1,705	4.49	New
Independent	Zile Singh	995	2.62	New
Independent	Amar Singh	439	1.16	New
Independent	Ramesh Chander Bhargava	405	1.07	New
Independent	Hari Krishan	346	0.91	New
Margin of victory		693	1.82	▼8.93
Turnout		37,975	70.73	▲7.86
Registered electors		54,828		▲10.32
INC gain from VHP		Swing	▼3.40	

=== Assembly Election 1968 ===
1968 Haryana Legislative Assembly election: Rewari
Party	Candidate	Votes	%	±%
VHP	Sumitra Devi	15,010	49.19	New
INC	Babu Dayal	11,727	38.43	▼17.57
ABJS	Abhai Singh	3,124	10.24	▼29.5
RPI	Mohan Lal	655	2.15	New
Margin of victory		3,283	10.76	▼5.51
Turnout		30,516	63.05	▼6.13
Registered electors		49,701		▲1.73
VHP gain from INC		Swing	▼6.81	

=== Assembly Election 1967 ===
1967 Haryana Legislative Assembly election: Rewari
Party	Candidate	Votes	%	±%
INC	Sumitra Devi	18,474	56.00	New
ABJS	Abhai Singh	13,108	39.73	New
CPI	B. Dass	1,009	3.06	New
Independent	Ved Prakash	399	1.21	New
Margin of victory		5,366	16.27	
Turnout		32,990	70.46	
Registered electors		48,855		
INC win (new seat)				

== See also ==
- Rewari
- List of constituencies of the Haryana Legislative Assembly
