= Indri City =

Indri
- City
- Indri
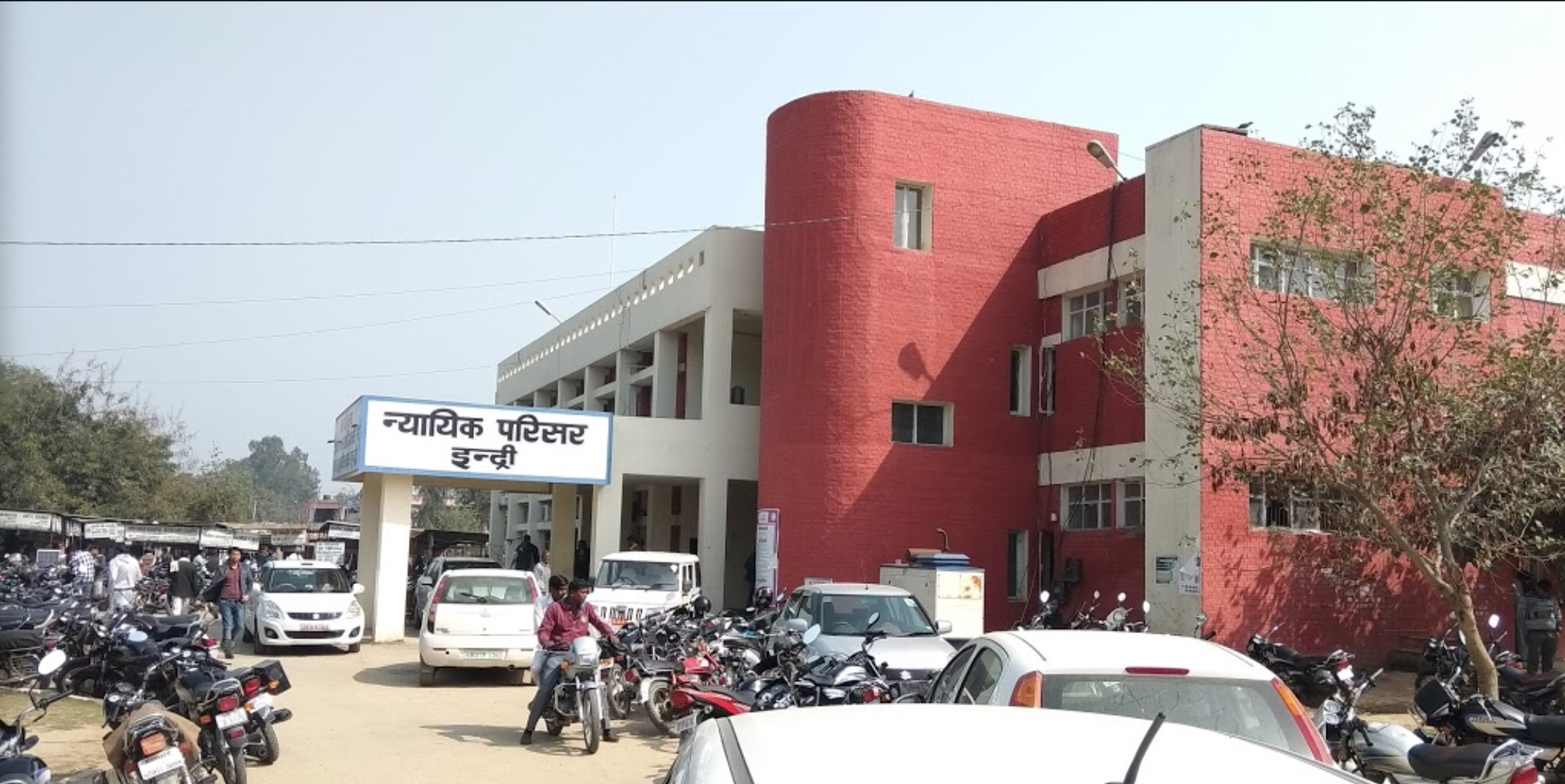
- Indri Tehsil in Karnal district, Haryana

- Location in Haryana, India Indri (India)
- Coordinates: 29.88°N 77.07°E
- Country: India
- State: Haryana
- District: Karnal
- Settled: 1888

Government
  - Type: municipal committee
  - Body: Bharatiya Janata Party
  - MLA: Ram Kumar Kashyap (BJP)
  - Mayor: Shivani Goel

Population (2011)
  - Total: 17,487

Languages
  - Official: Hindi, Haryanvi
- Time zone: UTC+5:30 (IST)
- PIN: 132041
- Telephone: 0184
- ISO 3166 code: IN-HR
- Vehicle registration: HR 75
- Website: haryana.gov.in

Indri is a city and a municipal committee in Karnal district in the Indian state of Haryana. It is about 24 km from Karnal City, the district headquarters. Indri is situated on state highway 7. The Indri city is divided into 13 wards for which elections are held every 5 years. Indri is famous for fair of a saint from Pakistan called Simran Das ji (Kachi Samadhi).

== Demographics ==
As of 2011 India census, Indri had a population of 17,487 of which 9,199 are males while 8,288 are females as per report released by Census India 2011.

The population of children with age of 0-6 is 2349 which is 13.43% of the total population of Indri (MC). In Indri Municipal Committee, the female sex ratio is 893 against the state average of 879. Moreover, the child sex ratio in Indri is around 834 compared to Haryana state average of 834. The literacy rate of Indri city is 75.41%, lower than the state average of 75.55%. In Indri, male literacy is around 80.82% while the female literacy rate is 69.47%.

== Governance ==
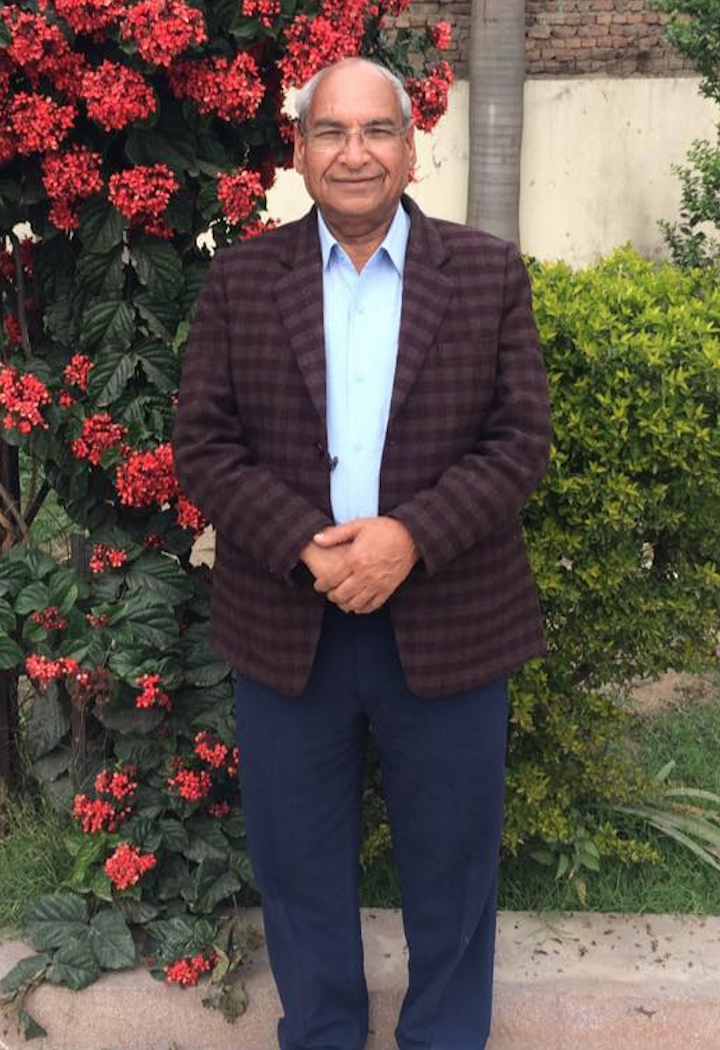
Ram Kumar Kashyap Deputy Speaker of Haryana Assembly Indri

Ram Kumar Kashyap is current Member of Legislative Assembly of Indri City constituency and Deputy Speaker of Haryana Assembly. He contested and won the elections from BJP ticket in the Haryana Legislative Assembly. After 2014 the city has gome through various developments. New State Roads, 4 Lane Indri-Karnal, Upgrading Schools, Herbal Park, Upgrading Civil Hospitals.

== Sub-Division ==
Former Haryana Chief Minister Bhupinder Singh Hooda and Ex MLA Bhim Sain Mehta upgraded Indri tehsil as a sub-division after winning by-elections.

The Punjab and Haryana high court has decided to open a sub-divisional court at Indri which is operational in Q4 2011. Vehicles with number plate HR-75 are registered in Indri RTO office in Haryana.

== Flora and fauna ==
Indri has a lot of biodiversity in flora and fauna. The city has its own new Herbal Park. Trees and plants found in this township region are babul/kikar, eucalyptus, sehtoot/mulberry, jamun, putush bushes, congress grass or gajar ghans etc. Birds found over this township region are sparrows, mynas, pigeons, kingfishers, parrots, egrets, etc. The species of fauna found over this township region include domestic animals such as cows, buffaloes, horses, monkey etc. including some reptiles such as mongoose, snakes etc.

Herbal Park is established(2015) to educate people about the traditional Indian system of medicine for generating awareness, preserving gene pool and production of quality seeds and seedlings for distribution to farmers. Farmers are also being encouraged for ex-situ cultivation and propagation of medicinal plants to save the natural biodiversity and Income Generation. These herbal Parks will help in conservation of species and also serve as gene-pool both for indigenous & exotic species.

== Climate ==
Temperature is extreme throughout the summer and winter and pleasant in other months of year.

== Administration ==
Indri is Town with Sub-Division having Regional Transport Office, Subdivisional Court, Tehsil, Civil Hospital & Antyodaya Saral Kendra.

== Utility services ==
The water supply in Indri is managed by its Jal Board and is very well managed. Indri Electric Supply Undertaking is managed by the UHBVN. BSNL provides teleservices for landline and mobile and many other services.
