= Umesh Aggarwal =

Indian politician

MLA, 13th Haryana Legislative Assembly
- In office 20 October 2014 – 24 October 2019
- Preceded by: Sukhbir Kataria
- Succeeded by: Sudhir Singla
- Constituency: Gurgaon (Vidhan Sabha constituency)

Haryana BJP media-in-charge
- In office 26 April 2018 – 14 March 2022
- Preceded by: Rajiv Jain

Personal details
- Born: 1 July 1970 (age 56) Gurgaon, Haryana, India
- Party: Aam Aadmi Party (2022-Present)
- Other political affiliations: Bharatiya Janata Party (2014-2022)
- Spouse: Anita Aggarwal
- Children: 1
- Education: M.A.
- Alma mater: Dronacharya Government College, Gurgaon
- Website: Official website

Umesh Aggarwal (born 1 July 1970) is an Indian politician affiliated with the AAP and is a member of the 13th Haryana Legislative Assembly, representing Gurgaon (Vidhan Sabha constituency).

He was also serving as Haryana BJP media-in-charge since his appointment in April 2018 till February 2022, before he joined AAP.

== Career ==
In 2014, Umesh Aggarwal won the 2014 Haryana Legislative Assembly election with a record margin of 84,095 votes from Gurgaon, defeating Gopi Chand Gehlot of Indian National Lok Dal. In April 2018, he was appointed the state media-in-charge of Bharatiya Janata Party in Haryana.

== Criminal Allegations ==
In 2015, a Delhi court had put on trial Umesh Aggarwal and Sandeep Luthra for allegedly raping a woman in a hotel after giving her sedative-laced drink.

However, in 2017 the court absolved them for alleged offences of rape on the grounds that the prosecution had not been able to prove its case against them beyond reasonable doubts. The three accused had argued that there was a monetary dispute between the woman and Rekha Suri (the third person accused and friend of the woman), due to which allegations were made by her against all three. Additional Sessions Judge Shail Jain said the woman had turned hostile and there was nothing incriminating against the accused. The judge also dispensed with the recording of the statements of the accused.

== Positions held ==
| # | From | To | Position | Refs. |
|---|---|---|---|---|
| 01 | 20 October 2014 | 24 October 2019 | Member, 13th Haryana Legislative Assembly | |
| 02 | 26 April 2018 | Incumbent | Haryana BJP media-in-charge | |

== See also ==
- Haryana Legislative Assembly
- 2014 Haryana Legislative Assembly election

Political offices
| Preceded by Sukhbir Kataria | MLA for Gurgaon; 20 October 2014 – present | Incumbent |
