= Indri Assembly constituency =

Legislative Assembly constituency in Haryana State, India

Coordinates: 29.89°N 77.05°E

Indri
- Constituency No. 20 for the Haryana Legislative Assembly

Constituency details
- Country: India
- Region: North India
- State: Haryana
- District: Karnal
- Lok Sabha constituency: Karnal
- Total electors: 2,18,617
- Reservation: None

Member of Legislative Assembly
- 15th Haryana Legislative Assembly
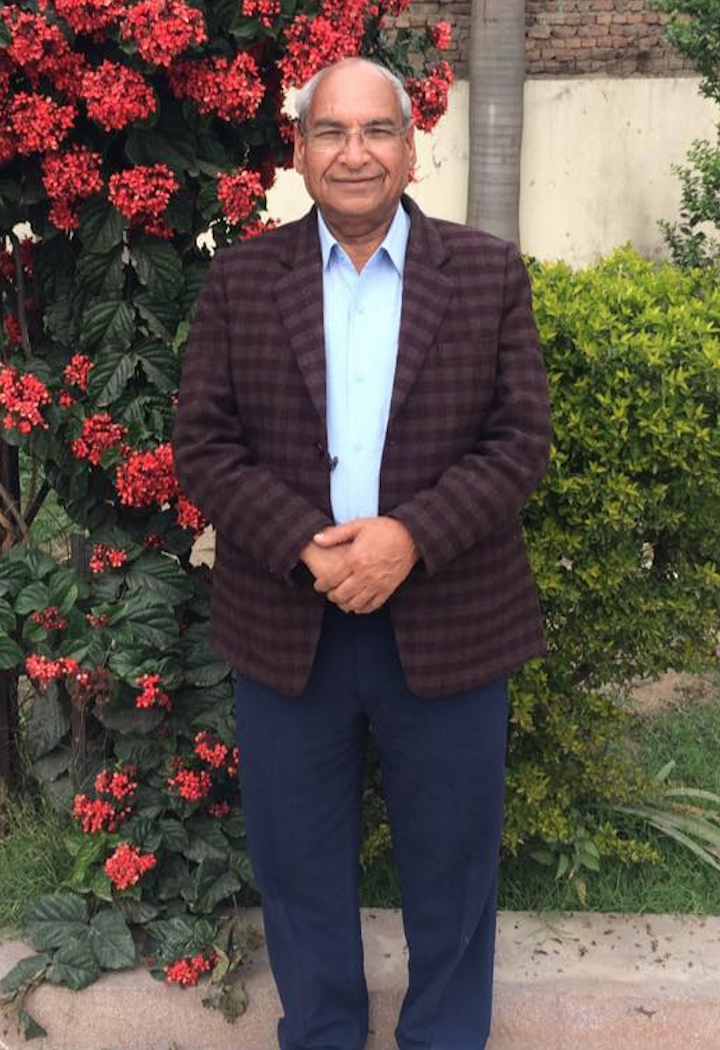
- Incumbent Ram Kumar Kashyap
- Party: Bharatiya Janata Party

Indri Assembly constituency is one of the 90 Legislative Assembly constituencies of Haryana state in India.

It is part of Karnal district. Ram Kumar Kashyap is the current MLA.

== Members of the Legislative Assembly ==
Year	Member	Party
1967	Parsani Devi Dhillon	Indian National Congress
1968	Parsani Devi Dhillon	Indian National Congress
1972	Parsani Devi Dhillon	Indian National Congress
1977	Des Raj	Janata Party
1982	Lachhman Singh	Lokdal
1987	Lachhman Singh	Lokdal
1991	Janki Devi Maan	Haryana Vikas Party
1996	Bhimsain Mehta	Independent
2000	Bhimsain Mehta	Independent
2005	Rakesh Kamboj	Indian National Congress
2008^	Bhimsain Mehta	Indian National Congress
2009	Ashok Kashyap	Indian National Lok Dal
2014	Karan Dev Kamboj	Bharatiya Janata Party
2019	Ram Kumar Kashyap	Bharatiya Janata Party
2024	Ram Kumar Kashyap	Bharatiya Janata Party

== Election results ==
=== Assembly Election 2024 ===
2024 Haryana Legislative Assembly election: Indri
Party	Candidate	Votes	%	±%
BJP	Ram Kumar Kashyap	80,465	51.39%	▲13.38
INC	Rakesh Kamboj	65,316	41.71%	▲29.96
BSP	Surender Udana	7,498	4.79%	▲0.19
AAP	Hawa Singh	1,483	0.95%	New
JJP	Kuldeep Singh Mandhan	1,187	0.76%	▼7.62
NOTA	None of the Above	428	0.27%	▼0.23
Margin of victory		15,149	9.68%	▲4.47
Turnout		1,56,577	71.59%	▼0.73
Registered electors		2,18,617		▲10.88
BJP hold		Swing	▲13.38	

=== Assembly Election 2019 ===
2019 Haryana Legislative Assembly election: Indri
Party	Candidate	Votes	%	±%
BJP	Ram Kumar Kashyap	54,221	38.01%	▲5.44
Independent	Rakesh Kamboj	46,790	32.80%	
INC	Dr. Navjot Kashyap	16,776	11.76%	▼1.44
JJP	Gurdev Singh	11,946	8.37%	
BSP	Hawa Singh	6,564	4.60%	▲1.25
INLD	Pardeep Kamboj	1,765	1.24%	▼14.34
LSP	Karta Ram	1,722	1.21%	
CPI	Ranjeet Singh	758	0.53%	▼0.13
NOTA	Nota	718	0.50%	▼0.01
Margin of victory		7,431	5.21%	▼11.79
Turnout		1,42,655	72.32%	▼7.24
Registered electors		1,97,250		▲11.71
BJP hold		Swing	▲5.44	

=== Assembly Election 2014 ===
2014 Haryana Legislative Assembly election: Indri
Party	Candidate	Votes	%	±%
BJP	Karan Dev Kamboj	45,756	32.57%	▲30.1
INLD	Usha Kashyap	21,881	15.58%	▼17.41
HJC(BL)	Rakesh Kamboj	18,892	13.45%	▼9.94
INC	Bhim Sain	18,550	13.20%	▼11.65
Independent	Rajiv Kumar Rangeela	12,830	9.13%	
Independent	Rakesh Baagh Singh	7,857	5.59%	
Independent	Ami Chand	5,893	4.19%	
BSP	Sushil Kumar	4,702	3.35%	▼3.42
CPI	Ranjeet Singh	931	0.66%	▼0.06
NOTA	None of the Above	716	0.51%	
Margin of victory		23,875	16.99%	▲8.86
Turnout		1,40,484	79.56%	▲3.53
Registered electors		1,76,573		▲20.06
BJP gain from INLD		Swing	▼0.42	

=== Assembly Election 2009 ===
2009 Haryana Legislative Assembly election: Indri
Party	Candidate	Votes	%	±%
INLD	Dr. Ashok Kashyap	36,886	32.99%	▲14.63
INC	Bhim Sain	27,789	24.85%	▼10.53
HJC(BL)	Rakesh	26,153	23.39%	
BSP	Sunil Kumar	7,569	6.77%	
Independent	Mohinder Panjokhara	5,217	4.67%	
BJP	Dharampal Sandilay	2,765	2.47%	▼5.26
NCP	Ved Pal	1,968	1.76%	▲0.3
CPI	Jila Singh	803	0.72%	
Margin of victory		9,097	8.14%	▼8.87
Turnout		1,11,817	76.03%	▼3.50
Registered electors		1,47,068		▲1.59
INLD gain from INC		Swing	▼2.40	

=== Assembly Election 2005 ===
2005 Haryana Legislative Assembly election: Indri
Party	Candidate	Votes	%	±%
INC	Rakesh Kumar	40,740	35.38%	▲19.54
Independent	Bhim Sain	21,162	18.38%	
INLD	Dr. Ashok Kashyap	21,134	18.36%	▼13.61
BRP	Angrej Singh Dhumsi	14,266	12.39%	
BJP	Mahender Kumar	8,901	7.73%	
Independent	Raj Pal Chhabra	4,452	3.87%	
NCP	Ved Pal	1,683	1.46%	▼3.6
Independent	Hari Chand	656	0.57%	
Margin of victory		19,578	17.00%	▲16.13
Turnout		1,15,135	79.53%	▲3.56
Registered electors		1,44,768		▲13.70
INC gain from Independent		Swing	▲2.55	

=== Assembly Election 2000 ===
2000 Haryana Legislative Assembly election: Indri
Party	Candidate	Votes	%	±%
Independent	Bhim Sain	31,767	32.84%	
INLD	Bal Krishan	30,924	31.97%	
INC	Randeep	15,325	15.84%	▼1.41
BSP	Kali Ram	6,973	7.21%	▼8.98
NCP	Ved Pal	4,892	5.06%	
HVP	Balbir S/O Santosh	2,922	3.02%	▼10.18
CPI	Zila Singh	1,393	1.44%	
Independent	Ravinder Nath Bhartiya	1,072	1.11%	
Margin of victory		843	0.87%	▼3.50
Turnout		96,735	75.98%	▲0.38
Registered electors		1,27,328		▼0.54
Independent hold		Swing	▲11.21	

=== Assembly Election 1996 ===
1996 Haryana Legislative Assembly election: Indri
Party	Candidate	Votes	%	±%
Independent	Bhim Sain	20,930	21.63%	
INC	Des Raj	16,698	17.25%	▲2.12
BSP	Dalbir	15,663	16.19%	▲4.63
SAP	Angrej Singh	14,109	14.58%	
HVP	Ved Pal	12,773	13.20%	▼5.62
Independent	Surinder Singh	8,994	9.29%	
JD	Lachhman	2,188	2.26%	
AIIC(T)	Jai Bhagwan	1,332	1.38%	
Margin of victory		4,232	4.37%	▲3.76
Turnout		96,772	78.66%	▲5.69
Registered electors		1,28,013		▲20.99
Independent gain from HVP		Swing	▲2.81	

=== Assembly Election 1991 ===
1991 Haryana Legislative Assembly election: Indri
Party	Candidate	Votes	%	±%
HVP	Janki Devi	13,917	18.81%	
Independent	Bhim Sain	13,461	18.20%	
INC	Parsani Devi	11,193	15.13%	▼12.07
JP	Jai Parkash	10,940	14.79%	
BSP	Mai Lal	8,546	11.55%	
Independent	Bal Krishan S/O Hari Swroop	6,290	8.50%	
Independent	Nathi Ram	3,266	4.42%	
BJP	Bal Kishan S/O Jai Narain	2,469	3.34%	
Independent	Nafe Singh	1,336	1.81%	
Independent	Sarjeet Singh	693	0.94%	
Margin of victory		456	0.62%	▼27.41
Turnout		73,970	73.59%	▼4.15
Registered electors		1,05,808		▲13.54
HVP gain from LKD		Swing	▼36.41	

=== Assembly Election 1987 ===
1987 Haryana Legislative Assembly election: Indri
Party	Candidate	Votes	%	±%
LKD	Lachhman	38,114	55.23%	▲6.83
INC	Des Raj	18,771	27.20%	▼11.68
Independent	Mai Lal	6,908	10.01%	
Independent	Navin Parkash	3,501	5.07%	
VHP	Dharam Singh	681	0.99%	
Independent	Janardhan	628	0.91%	
Margin of victory		19,343	28.03%	▲18.51
Turnout		69,013	75.06%	▲5.17
Registered electors		93,189		▲22.58
LKD hold		Swing	▲6.83	

=== Assembly Election 1982 ===
1982 Haryana Legislative Assembly election: Indri
Party	Candidate	Votes	%	±%
LKD	Lachhman	25,345	48.40%	
INC	Des Raj	20,359	38.88%	▲8.9
Independent	Sat Pal	3,057	5.84%	
Independent	Ram Singh	1,053	2.01%	
JP	Om Prakash	897	1.71%	▼65.8
Independent	Sadhu Ram	382	0.73%	
Independent	Joginder Singh	350	0.67%	
Independent	Ravi Datt	330	0.63%	
Margin of victory		4,986	9.52%	▼28.01
Turnout		52,368	70.20%	▼1.73
Registered electors		76,020		▲19.28
LKD gain from JP		Swing	▼19.12	

=== Assembly Election 1977 ===
1977 Haryana Legislative Assembly election: Indri
Party	Candidate	Votes	%	±%
JP	Des Raj	30,386	67.52%	
INC	Surjit Singh	13,493	29.98%	▼17.39
Independent	Sat Pal	793	1.76%	
VHP	Ram Sarup Giri	334	0.74%	
Margin of victory		16,893	37.53%	▲34.99
Turnout		45,006	71.59%	▼4.81
Registered electors		63,732		▲2.69
JP gain from INC		Swing	▲20.15	

=== Assembly Election 1972 ===
1972 Haryana Legislative Assembly election: Indri
Party	Candidate	Votes	%	±%
INC	Parsani Devi	22,174	47.37%	▲12.2
INC(O)	Des Raj	20,982	44.82%	
Independent	Basheshar Dass	1,845	3.94%	
Independent	Mangat Ram	1,519	3.24%	
Independent	Jai Ram Sarup	293	0.63%	
Margin of victory		1,192	2.55%	▼6.49
Turnout		46,813	77.63%	▲17.83
Registered electors		62,064		▲15.89
INC hold		Swing	▲12.20	

=== Assembly Election 1968 ===
1968 Haryana Legislative Assembly election: Indri
Party	Candidate	Votes	%	±%
INC	Parsani Devi	10,846	35.16%	▼11.76
Independent	Des Raj	8,060	26.13%	
VHP	Mool Chand	5,413	17.55%	
ABJS	Ved Pal	4,472	14.50%	▼1.69
SWA	Ajit Kumar Singh	2,054	6.66%	
Margin of victory		2,786	9.03%	▼21.70
Turnout		30,845	59.32%	▼12.66
Registered electors		53,554		▲3.51
INC hold		Swing	▼11.76	

=== Assembly Election 1967 ===
1967 Haryana Legislative Assembly election: Indri
Party	Candidate	Votes	%	±%
INC	Parsani Devi	17,056	46.92%	
ABJS	T. Ram	5,885	16.19%	
Independent	G. Ram	4,969	13.67%	
Independent	R. Kishan	3,325	9.15%	
CPI(M)	B. Singh	3,286	9.04%	
RPI	P. Singh	1,705	4.69%	
Independent	K. Ram	125	0.34%	
Margin of victory		11,171	30.73%	
Turnout		36,351	75.39%	
Registered electors		51,738		
INC win (new seat)				

== See also ==
- List of constituencies of the Haryana Legislative Assembly
- Karnal district
