= Gurgaon Assembly constituency =

Constituency of the Haryana legislative assembly in India

Coordinates: 28.45°N 77.01°E

- Constituency No. 77 for the Haryana Legislative Assembly

Constituency details
- Country: India
- Region: North India
- State: Haryana
- District: Gurgaon
- Lok Sabha constituency: Gurgaon
- Established: 1968
- Total electors: 4,37,674
- Reservation: None

Member of Legislative Assembly
- 15th Haryana Legislative Assembly
- Incumbent Mukesh Sharma
- Party: BJP
- Elected year: 2024

Gurgaon Assembly constituency is one of the 90 constituencies in the Haryana Legislative Assembly of Haryana a north state of India. Gurgaon is also part of Gurgaon Lok Sabha constituency.

== Members of Legislative Assembly ==
Year	Member	Party
1967	Pratap Singh Thakran	Bharatiya Jana Sangh
1968	Rao Mahabir Singh	Indian National Congress
1972	Rao Mahabir Singh	Indian National Congress
1977	Pratap Singh Thakran	Janata Party
1982	Dharambir Yadav	Indian National Congress
1987	Sita Ram Singla	Bharatiya Janata Party
1991	Dharambir Yadav	Indian National Congress
1996	Dharambir Yadav	Indian National Congress
2000	Gopi Chand Gahlawat	Independent
2005	Dharambir Yadav	Indian National Congress
2009	Sukhbir Kataria	Independent
2014	Umesh Aggarwal	Bharatiya Janata Party
2019	Sudhir Singla	Bharatiya Janata Party
2024	Mukesh Sharma	Bharatiya Janata Party

== Election results ==
=== Assembly Election 2024 ===
2024 Haryana Legislative Assembly election: Gurgaon
Party	Candidate	Votes	%	±%
BJP	Mukesh Sharma	122,615	53.29%	▲9.95
Independent	Naveen Goyal	54,570	23.72%	New
INC	Mohit Grover	46,947	20.40%	▲8.17
AAP	Dr. Nishant Anand	2,177	0.95%	▼2.02
NOTA	None of the Above	1,075	0.47%	▼0.23
Margin of victory		68,045	29.57%	▲11.96
Turnout		2,30,147	51.88	▼0.42
Registered electors		4,37,674		▲22.55
BJP hold		Swing	▲9.95	

=== Assembly Election 2019 ===
2019 Haryana Legislative Assembly election: Gurgaon
Party	Candidate	Votes	%	±%
BJP	Sudhir Singla	81,953	43.33	▼12.51
Independent	Mohit Grover	48,638	25.72	New
INC	Sukhbir Kataria	23,126	12.23	▲2.18
JJP	Sube Singh Bohra	9,331	4.93	New
Independent	Gaje Singh Kablana	8,279	4.38	New
AAP	Ranbeer Singh Rathi(R S Rathee)	5,612	2.97	New
Independent	Bhopal Singh Rao	4,553	2.41	New
BSP	Narender Singh	1,858	0.98	▼1.08
Independent	Ashwani Sharma	1,346	0.71	New
NOTA	Nota	1,317	0.70	▼0.05
Margin of victory		33,315	17.62	▼26.65
Turnout		1,89,116	52.30	▼11.80
Registered electors		3,61,581		▲22.00
BJP hold		Swing	▼12.51	

=== Assembly Election 2014 ===
2014 Haryana Legislative Assembly election: Gurgaon
Party	Candidate	Votes	%	±%
BJP	Umesh Aggarwal	106,106	55.85	▲36.80
INLD	Gopi Chand Gahlot	22,011	11.59	▲9.12
INC	Dharambir Gaba	19,094	10.05	▼20.97
Independent	Sukhbir Kataria	15,755	8.29	New
Independent	Gaje Singh Kablana	15,082	7.94	New
BSP	Dharam Vir	3,923	2.06	▼1.46
Independent	R. S. Rathee	2,176	1.15	New
NOTA	None of the Above	1,414	0.74	New
Margin of victory		84,095	44.26	▲42.55
Turnout		1,89,993	64.11	▲9.94
Registered electors		2,96,368		▲28.11
BJP gain from Independent		Swing	▲23.12	

=== Assembly Election 2009 ===
2009 Haryana Legislative Assembly election: Gurgaon
Party	Candidate	Votes	%	±%
Independent	Sukhbir Kataria	41,013	32.73	New
INC	Dharambir	38,873	31.02	▼23.56
BJP	Umesh Aggarwal	23,864	19.04	▲7.69
Independent	R. S. Rathee	5,951	4.75	New
HJC(BL)	Kanhiya Lal	4,674	3.73	New
BSP	Bhim Singh Rathee	4,420	3.53	▲1.44
INLD	Mani Ram Sharma	3,089	2.46	▼22.90
Margin of victory		2,140	1.71	▼27.51
Turnout		1,25,317	54.17	▲6.30
Registered electors		2,31,340		▼20.80
Independent gain from INC		Swing	▼21.85	

=== Assembly Election 2005 ===
2005 Haryana Legislative Assembly election: Gurgaon
Party	Candidate	Votes	%	±%
INC	Dharambir	76,319	54.58%	▲30.99
INLD	Gopi Chand	35,465	25.36%	New
BJP	Sudha	15,879	11.36%	▼5.35
Independent	Col. Ratan Singh	5,839	4.18%	New
BSP	Ram Chander Vashist	2,923	2.09%	▼12.62
CPI	Subhash Chand	1,101	0.79%	New
Independent	Satish Maratha	782	0.56%	New
Margin of victory		40,854	29.22%	▲14.87
Turnout		1,39,829	47.87%	▼8.03
Registered electors		2,92,086		▲52.98
INC gain from Independent		Swing	▲16.64	

=== Assembly Election 2000 ===
2000 Haryana Legislative Assembly election: Gurgaon
Party	Candidate	Votes	%	±%
Independent	Gopi Chand	40,493	37.94%	New
INC	Dharambir	25,181	23.59%	▼6.79
BJP	Tilak Raj	17,833	16.71%	▼7.04
BSP	Rao Narbir Singh	15,704	14.71%	▲11.19
Independent	Manohar Lal Dhingra	2,413	2.26%	New
HVP	Mukesh Sharma	1,377	1.29%	New
Independent	Dhanno Bai Hizra	1,283	1.20%	New
Independent	Bhagwan Dass	677	0.63%	New
Independent	Mahesh Kumar	622	0.58%	New
Margin of victory		15,312	14.35%	▲7.72
Turnout		1,06,726	55.98%	▼4.12
Registered electors		1,90,931		▲3.27
Independent gain from INC		Swing	▲7.56	

=== Assembly Election 1996 ===
1996 Haryana Legislative Assembly election: Gurgaon
Party	Candidate	Votes	%	±%
INC	Dharambir	33,716	30.38%	▼13.84
BJP	Sita Ram Singla	26,358	23.75%	▲10.56
SAP	Gopi Chand	26,097	23.52%	New
JD	Krishan Lal	8,157	7.35%	▼1.61
AIIC(T)	Khazan Singh	4,286	3.86%	New
BSP	Madan Lal S/O Haria	3,916	3.53%	New
Independent	Madan Lal S/O Kotu Ram	2,162	1.95%	New
Independent	Vashistha Kumar	1,764	1.59%	New
SHS	Bishan	580	0.52%	New
Margin of victory		7,358	6.63%	▼16.27
Turnout		1,10,968	61.81%	▼0.75
Registered electors		1,84,880		▲34.01
INC hold		Swing	▼13.84	

=== Assembly Election 1991 ===
1991 Haryana Legislative Assembly election: Gurgaon
Party	Candidate	Votes	%	±%
INC	Dharambir S/O Pannu Ram	37,081	44.23%	▲14.01
Independent	Gopi Chand	17,879	21.32%	New
BJP	Sita Ram Singla	11,060	13.19%	▼46.64
JD	Gajraj Singh	7,513	8.96%	New
JP	Nawal Singh	5,786	6.90%	New
Independent	Yashwant Singh	733	0.87%	New
Independent	Mahender Singh	717	0.86%	New
Independent	Jagdish Raghav	594	0.71%	New
Independent	Manohar Lal Goyal	562	0.67%	New
Margin of victory		19,202	22.90%	▼6.71
Turnout		83,844	62.31%	▼10.87
Registered electors		1,37,961		▲21.68
INC gain from BJP		Swing	▼15.60	

=== Assembly Election 1987 ===
1987 Haryana Legislative Assembly election: Gurgaon
Party	Candidate	Votes	%	±%
BJP	Sita Ram Singla	48,596	59.83%	▲31.18
INC	Dharam Vir Gawa	24,545	30.22%	▼12.57
Independent	Gajraj Singh Rao	5,354	6.59%	New
CPI	K. D. Rishi	1,155	1.42%	▼0.52
Margin of victory		24,051	29.61%	▲15.47
Turnout		81,227	72.71%	▲5.22
Registered electors		1,13,377		▲29.87
BJP gain from INC		Swing	▲17.04	

=== Assembly Election 1982 ===
1982 Haryana Legislative Assembly election: Gurgaon
Party	Candidate	Votes	%	±%
INC	Dharambir	24,809	42.78%	▲28.75
BJP	Sita Ram Singla	16,610	28.64%	New
Independent	Partap Singh Thakran	9,649	16.64%	New
Independent	Gajraj Singh	3,941	6.80%	New
CPI	K. D. Rishi	1,126	1.94%	New
JP	Phool Chand Suman	438	0.76%	▼38.14
Independent	Sita Ram Sharma	388	0.67%	New
Margin of victory		8,199	14.14%	▲3.59
Turnout		57,986	67.34%	▲5.84
Registered electors		87,301		▲32.35
INC gain from JP		Swing	▲3.89	

=== Assembly Election 1977 ===
1977 Haryana Legislative Assembly election: Gurgaon
Party	Candidate	Votes	%	±%
JP	Pratap Singh Thakran	15,543	38.90%	New
Independent	Ram Chander	11,327	28.35%	New
INC	Kamla Devi	5,608	14.03%	▼38.94
Independent	Sultan Singh	3,224	8.07%	New
Independent	Hit Ahbhalashi	1,429	3.58%	New
Independent	Banwari Lal	1,247	3.12%	New
Independent	Chamel Devi	751	1.88%	New
Independent	Rajesh	491	1.23%	New
Margin of victory		4,216	10.55%	▼2.15
Turnout		39,961	61.29%	▼3.48
Registered electors		65,962		▼4.77
JP gain from INC		Swing	▼14.08	

=== Assembly Election 1972 ===
1972 Haryana Legislative Assembly election: Gurgaon
Party	Candidate	Votes	%	±%
INC	Mahabir Singh	23,507	52.98%	▼5.15
ABJS	Ram Chander Gulati	17,873	40.28%	▲2.58
Independent	Surrendera Singh	1,903	4.29%	New
Independent	Balbir Singh	1,090	2.46%	New
Margin of victory		5,634	12.70%	▼7.73
Turnout		44,373	65.23%	▲9.30
Registered electors		69,263		▲15.36
INC hold		Swing	▼5.15	

=== Assembly Election 1968 ===
1968 Haryana Legislative Assembly election: Gurgaon
Party	Candidate	Votes	%	±%
INC	Mahabir Singh	19,114	58.12%	▲16.03
ABJS	Partap Singh Thakran	12,396	37.69%	▼15.13
Independent	Charan Singh	634	1.93%	New
Independent	Ganga Jiwan	319	0.97%	New
Independent	Ganeshi	249	0.76%	New
Independent	Roop Chand	173	0.53%	New
Margin of victory		6,718	20.43%	▲9.70
Turnout		32,885	56.24%	▼14.81
Registered electors		60,043		▲6.14
INC gain from ABJS		Swing	▲5.30	

=== Assembly Election 1967 ===
1967 Haryana Legislative Assembly election: Gurgaon
Party	Candidate	Votes	%	±%
ABJS	Pratap Singh Thakran	20,792	52.82%	New
INC	Kanhaya Lal	16,567	42.09%	New
RPI	R. Sarup	1,001	2.54%	New
Independent	S. Ram	548	1.39%	New
Independent	B. Aggarwal	454	1.15%	New
Margin of victory		4,225	10.73%	
Turnout		39,362	73.20%	
Registered electors		56,569		
ABJS win (new seat)				

== See also ==
- Gurgaon
- Gurgaon district
- List of constituencies of the Haryana Legislative Assembly
