= Karan Dev Kamboj =

Indian politician

Minister of State Government of Haryana
- In office 26 October 2014 – 27 October 2019
- Ministry: Term
- Minister of Food & Civil Supplies (Independent Charge): 24 July 2015 - 27 October 2019
- Minister of Forest: 24 July 2015 - 27 October 2019
- Minister of Food & Civil Supplies Minister of Transport Minister of Tourism: 26 October 2014 - 24 July 2015

Member of Haryana Legislative Assembly
- In office 2014–2019
- Preceded by: Ashok Kashyap
- Succeeded by: Ram Kumar Kashyap
- Constituency: Indri

Personal details
- Other political affiliations: Bhartiya Janta Party (until 2024)

Karan Dev Kamboj is an Indian National Congress politician and former member of legislative assembly (MLA) of Haryana state in India, from 2014 to 2019. He represented Indri constituency in the Haryana Legislative Assembly, and was sworn in as minister of state transport of Haryana after the BJP won in the Haryana Legislative Assembly election, 2014.
