= Jaswant Singh Bawal =

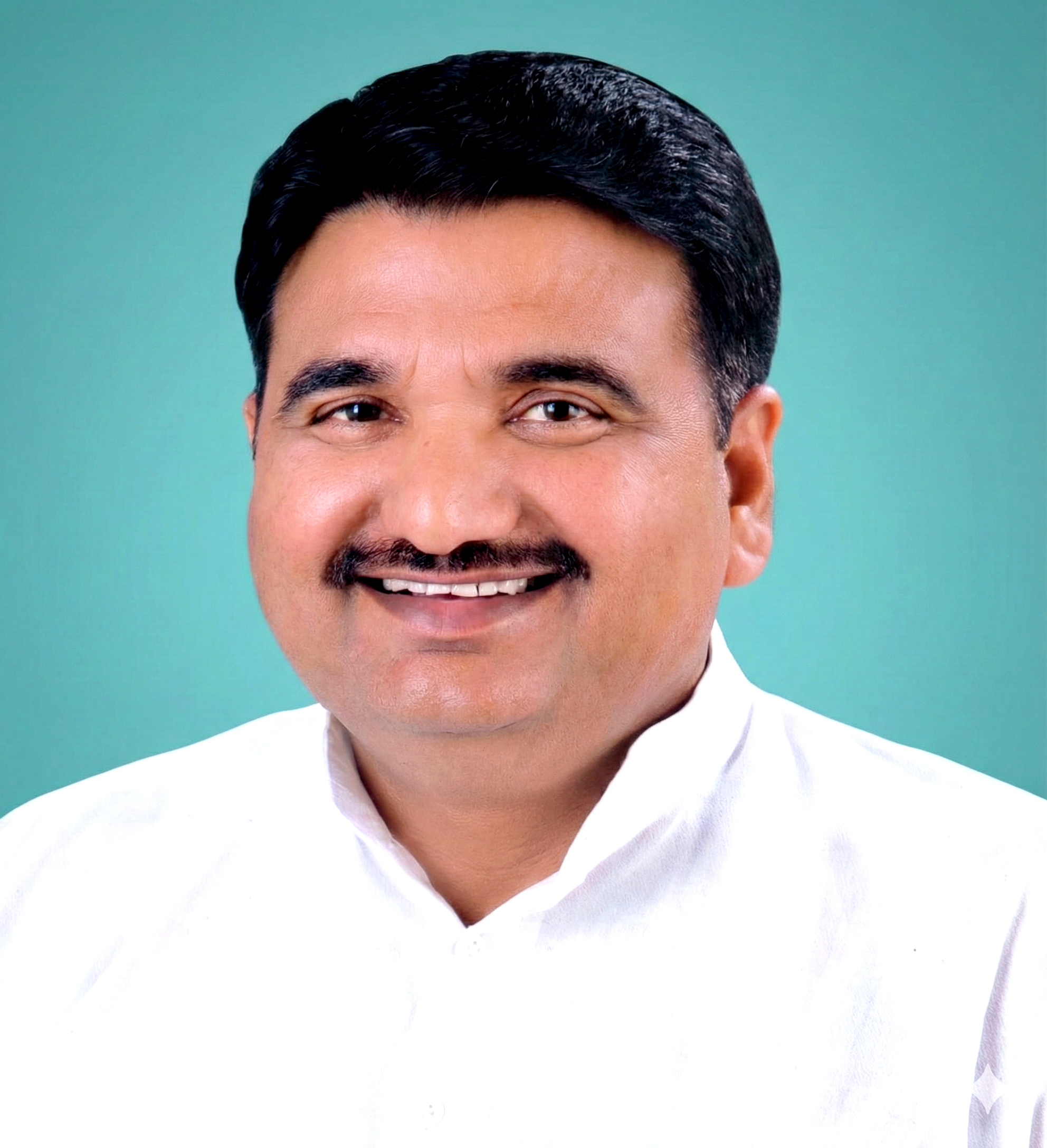
- Jaswant Singh Bawal in 2014

Member of the Haryana Legislative Assembly
- In office 1996–2000
- Constituency: Bawal

Minister for Agriculture, Revenue, P.W.D (B&R), Public Health, Punjab Waqf Board, and Civil Aviation
- In office 1996–1999
- Premier: Bansi Lal

Personal details
- Born: Rewari district, Haryana, India
- Party: Indian National Congress
- Other political affiliations: Haryana Vikas Party (1996–2000); Haryana Janhit Congress
- Parent: Ram Prashad (Former MLA) (father)
- Education: Maharshi Dayanand University (B.A.); University of Delhi (LL.B.)
- Occupation: Politician

Jaswant Singh Bawal is an Indian politician and veteran leader from Haryana. He served as a Member of the Legislative Assembly (MLA) and held multiple cabinet portfolios (State Minister) in the Government of Haryana. He belongs to a prominent political family in the Rewari district, representing the Bawal Assembly constituency.

== Early life and education ==
Jaswant Singh Bawal was born into a political family. His father, Ram Prashad, was a veteran politician who served as the MLA for the Bawal constituency, winning the 1972 election representing the Indian National Congress.

He completed his Bachelor of Arts (B.A.) from Maharshi Dayanand University (MDU Rohtak) in 1986. He later pursued legal studies, earning an LL.B. from the University of Delhi in 1992.

Inspired by his father's legacy, he became active in social and political movements in the Ahirwal region.

== Political career ==
Bawal's political journey is marked by his long-standing association with the development of the Bawal region and the welfare of the Scheduled Caste (SC) community.

=== 1996 Election and Ministry ===
In the 1996 Haryana Legislative Assembly election, Bawal contested from the Bawal constituency on a Haryana Vikas Party (HVP) ticket. He won the seat, defeating Shakuntla Bhagwaria of the Indian National Congress. Following the victory, he was appointed as a Cabinet Minister in the government led by Chief Minister Bansi Lal.

During his tenure as a minister, he held several key portfolios:

- Agriculture
- Revenue
- P.W.D (B&R)
- Public Health
- Punjab Waqf Board
- Civil Aviation
- Fishries

=== Party affiliations ===
Over his career, Bawal has been a significant figure across different political platforms:

- Haryana Janhit Congress (HJC): He served as a senior leader and state vice-president for several years.
- Indian National Congress: He rejoined the Congress in 2014 and again in 2024, citing his ideological roots in the party his father once represented.
- Bharatiya Janata Party (BJP): He had a brief tenure with the BJP before returning to the Congress fold in May 2024.

== Electoral performance ==
Year	Constituency	Party	Result
1996	Bawal	Haryana Vikas Party	Won
2005	Bawal	Independent	Lost
2014	Bawal	Indian National Congress	Lost

== See also ==
- Bawal Assembly constituency
- Haryana Vikas Party
