= Bikram Singh Thekedar =

Indian politician

Minister of State Government of Haryana
- In office 26 October 2014 – 22 July 2016
- Ministry: Term
- Minister of Agriculture: 24 July 2015 - 22 July 2016
- Minister of Rural Development & Panchayat Raj: 26 October 2014 - 24 July 2015
- Minister of Co-operation (Independent Charge): 26 October 2014 - 22 July 2016

Member of Haryana Legislative Assembly
- In office 2014–2019
- Preceded by: Yaduvender Singh
- Succeeded by: Laxman Singh Yadav
- Constituency: Kosli

Personal details
- Born: 10 April 1970 (age 56) Pataudi, Gurgaon, Haryana
- Party: Bharatiya Janata Party
- Spouse: Suresh Devi
- Children: Two
- Occupation: Political & Social Worker, Agriculturist

Bikram Singh Thekedar is a Bharatiya Janata Party (BJP) politician, Former Member of Legislative Assembly (MLA) representing Kosli constituency in the Haryana Legislative Assembly, and was sworn-in as Minister of State of Haryana on 26 October 2014. He is also an active social worker. He holds the charge for the following 3 departments:

- Department of Cooperation (Independent Charge), Haryana.
- Department of Printing and Stationery (Independent Charge), Haryana.
- Department of Agriculture (Attached with Agriculture Minister), Haryana.

== Personal life ==
Bikram Singh was born in Gurgaon, Haryana on 10 April 1970 to Dalip Singh and Rajballa. He has one brother and two sisters, with Bikram being the eldest of the four. He completed his graduation from D.A.V College, Ajmer, Rajasthan and is married to Suresh Devi.
