= Ram Kumar Kashyap =

Indian politician

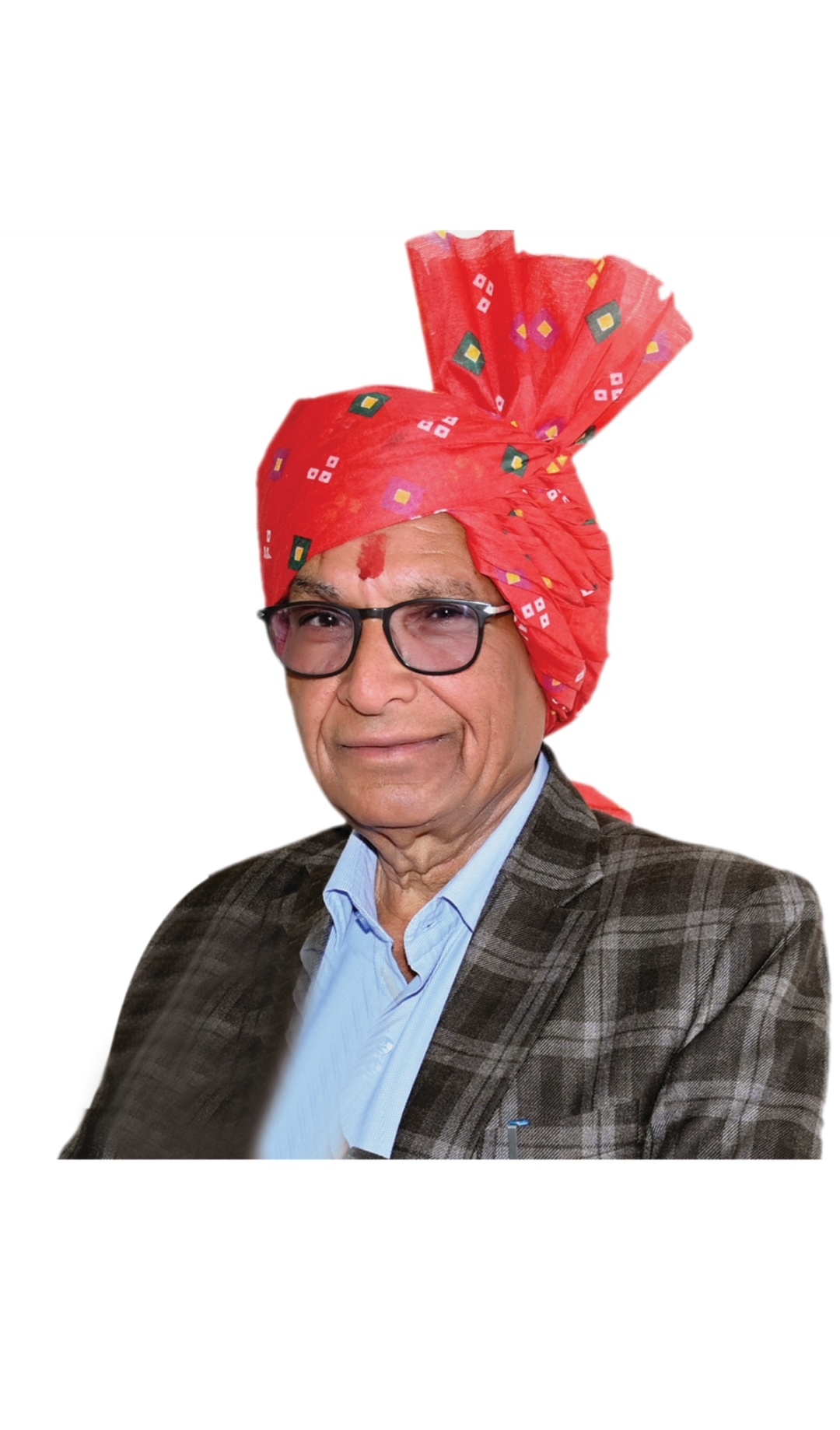
- Kashyap in 2025

Government Chief Whip, Haryana
- Incumbent
- Assumed office 2024 - Present
- Constituency: Indri

Member of Haryana Legislative Assembly
- Incumbent
- Assumed office 2019 - 2024
- Preceded by: Karan Dev Kamboj
- Constituency: Indri

Member of Parliament, Rajya Sabha
- In office 2014–2019
- Constituency: Haryana

Member, Haryana Public Service Commission
- In office 2004–2009

Personal details
- Born: Ram Kumar Kashyap; 6 March 1951 (age 75) Ugala, Haryana, India
- Party: Bharatiya Janata Party (2019–present)
- Other political affiliations: Indian National Lok Dal (till 2019)
- Spouse: Jeeto Devi
- Children: 3
- Profession: Politician

Ram Kumar Kashyap (born 6 March 1951) is an Indian politician, social worker, and farmer from Haryana, India. He is currently serving as a Member of the Haryana Legislative Assembly from Indri since 2019 and as the Chief Whip in the Government of Haryana. He is a member of the Bharatiya Janata Party.

He has previously served as a Member of Parliament in the Rajya Sabha and as a member of the Haryana Public Service Commission (HPSC).

== Early life and education ==
Ram Kumar Kashyap was born on 6 March 1951. His father's name is Banarsi Das. He holds a Master's degree in Economics (M.A.) and a Bachelor of Laws (LL.B).

== Career ==
He served in the Statistics Department of Haryana for approximately 26 years. In addition, he has been active as a farmer and social worker.

== Social and organizational roles ==
Ram Kumar Kashyap has served as the former State President of the Haryana Kashyap Rajput Sabha and has worked for the upliftment of various sections of society.

== Political career ==
- 2004 – 2009: Member, Haryana Public Service Commission (HPSC)
- 2014 – 2019: Member of Parliament, Rajya Sabha
- 2019 – 2024: Member of Legislative Assembly, Indri (Haryana)
- 2024 – present: Member of Legislative Assembly, Indri and Government Chief Whip,Haryana

== Personal life ==
He is married and belongs to the Kashyap-Rajput community. His residence is in Kurukshetra, Haryana.
