= Ajay Singh Yadav =

Indian politician

President of All India Congress Committee(OBC Department)
- Incumbent
- Assumed office 25 February 2022 — 10 April 2025
- Preceded by: Tamradhwaj Sahu
- Succeeded by: Dr. Anil Kumar Yadav

Member of Haryana Legislative Assembly
- In office 1991 – 2014
- Preceded by: Raghu Yadav
- Succeeded by: Randhir Singh Kapriwas
- Constituency: Rewari

Minister of Power, Forests & Environment Government of Haryana
- In office 2005 – 2009

Minister of Irrigation, Public Works & Elections Government of Haryana
- In office 2009 – 2014

Personal details
- Born: 2 November 1958 (age 67) Saharanwas, Rewari
- Party: Indian National Congress until 2024
- Spouse: Shakuntla Yadav
- Children: 2 (including Chiranjeev Rao)

Captain Ajay Singh Yadav is a former Indian National Congress politician from the state of Haryana, India. In 2008 he was appointed as Minister of Power, Forests and Environment and was formerly minister of Irrigation, Revenue and Elections for that state. In February 2022, he was appointed the National Chairman of Other Backward Class department of the All India Congress Committee.

== Early life ==
Ajay Singh Yadav was born on 2 November 1958 in a Yadav family at Saharanwas village, Rewari district, Haryana. His father was Rao Abhey Singh, who had also been a Member of the Legislative Assembly in Haryana. He was educated at various places including Jaipur, Chandigarh, New Delhi and Rewari, graduating with the degrees of BSc and LL.B. Singh became second lieutenant in the Indian Army on 7 June 1980, and resigned seven years later on 26 June 1987 as captain. After his military service, Singh pursued a political career in Rewari district.

== Electoral performance ==
1991 Haryana Legislative Assembly election: Rewari
Party	Candidate	Votes	%	±%
INC	Ajay Singh Yadav	33,922	52.78	▲29.36
HVP	Rajinder Singh	8,098	12.60	New
BJP	Shiv Rattan Singh	7,463	11.61	New
Independent	Inderpal	5,092	7.92	New
Sarvajati Janta Panchayat	Mittar Sain	4,198	6.53	New
LKD	Jaggan Singh	1,758	2.74	▼52.64
Independent	Jai Singh	931	1.45	New
Jawan Kisan Mazdur Party	Chiranji S/O Mam Chand	655	1.02	New
Doordarshi Party	Lal Chand	432	0.67	New
Independent	Joginder	367	0.57	New
Margin of victory		25,824	40.18	▲8.23
Turnout		64,269	59.98	▼12.01
Registered electors		1,11,081		▲11.06
INC gain from LKD		Swing	▼2.59	

1996 Haryana Legislative Assembly election: Rewari
Party	Candidate	Votes	%	±%
INC	Ajay Singh Yadav	22,099	26.70	▼26.08
Independent	Randhir Singh Kapriwas	20,332	24.56	New
BJP	Sharda	18,566	22.43	▲10.82
BSP	Ishwar Yadav	7,362	8.89	New
SP	Master Brinder Singh	5,943	7.18	New
SAP	Sunil Rao	2,705	3.27	New
Independent	Shri Ram Sambharya	2,004	2.42	New
AIIC(T)	K . R. Khurana	1,262	1.52	New
Akhil Bharatiya Jan Sangh	Jagdish Sharma	472	0.57	New
Margin of victory		1,767	2.13	▼38.05
Turnout		82,779	65.55	▲4.69
Registered electors		1,32,344		▲19.14
INC hold		Swing	▼26.08	

2000 Haryana Legislative Assembly election: Rewari
Party	Candidate	Votes	%	±%
INC	Ajay Singh Yadav	26,036	28.96	▲2.27
Independent	Vijay Somani	21,112	23.49	New
Independent	Randhir Singh Kapriwas	20,016	22.27	New
Independent	Rajender Singh	10,167	11.31	New
BJP	Shiv Rattan Singh	9,006	10.02	▼12.41
Independent	Hirdey Ram	1,266	1.41	New
Independent	Ashok Gulati	624	0.69	New
HVP	Sheo Lal	542	0.60	New
Independent	Radhey Shyam	536	0.60	New
Margin of victory		4,924	5.48	▲3.34
Turnout		89,890	66.90	▲4.33
Registered electors		1,34,414		▲1.56
INC hold		Swing	▲2.27	

2005 Haryana Legislative Assembly election: Rewari
Party	Candidate	Votes	%	±%
INC	Ajay Singh Yadav	48,924	44.72	▲15.75
BJP	Randhir Singh Kapriwas	36,145	33.04	▲23.02
Independent	Vijay Somany	12,140	11.10	New
INLD	Thekedar Rajinder Singh	5,840	5.34	New
BSP	Manjeet	3,003	2.74	New
Independent	Sudesh	969	0.89	New
Independent	Rohtash	574	0.52	New
Margin of victory		12,779	11.68	▲6.20
Turnout		1,09,404	73.77	▲6.89
Registered electors		1,48,312		▲10.34
INC hold		Swing	▲15.75	

2014 Haryana Legislative Assembly election: Rewari
Party	Candidate	Votes	%	±%
BJP	Randhir Singh Kapriwas	81,103	52.92	▲32.66
INLD	Satish Yadav	35,637	23.25	▲20.57
INC	Ajay Singh Yadav	31,471	20.53	▼19.78
BSP	Pritam Kumar	1,312	0.86	▼4.47
HJC(BL)	Raghu Yadav	935	0.61	▼0.36
Independent	Vijay Somany	784	0.51	New
Margin of victory		45,466	29.66	▲18.63
Turnout		1,53,268	75.18	▲2.49
Registered electors		2,03,862		▲23.04
BJP gain from INC		Swing	▲12.60	

2009 Haryana Legislative Assembly election: Rewari
Party	Candidate	Votes	%	±%
INC	Ajay Singh Yadav	48,557	40.31	▼4.40
Independent	Satish S/O Roshan Lal	35,269	29.28	New
BJP	Randhir Singh Kapriwas	24,396	20.25	▼12.78
BSP	Vijay Somany	6,418	5.33	▲2.58
INLD	Anil Kumar	3,225	2.68	▼2.66
HJC(BL)	Rajinder Singh	1,164	0.97	New
Margin of victory		13,288	11.03	▼0.65
Turnout		1,20,446	72.69	▼1.07
Registered electors		1,65,691		▲11.72
INC hold		Swing	▼4.40	

== Political career ==
Singh was a Member of the Legislative Assembly in Haryana for six consecutive terms, totalling 25 years.

He held the following offices:

- Member, A.I.C.C.
- Member, P.C.C.
- Deputy Leader Congress Legislative Party
- President D.C.C., Rewari
- Secretary, Haryana State Kisan Congress
- Minister for Jails, for Printing & Stationery, for Social Welfare and Women as well as for Child Development
- Officiated C.L.P. Leader in Haryana
- Deputy Leader C.L.P. in Haryana
- AICC State Observer for Rajasthan, Himachal Pradesh and Madhya Pradesh during Assembly and Lok Sabha elections.
- Finance, Irrigation & PWD Minister.
- National Chairman, A.I.C.C. O.B.C. (present)

He has been a Member of Legislative Assembly. On 29 July 2014, Singh resigned from his post and submitted his resignation letter to Bhupinder Singh Hooda. However, Singh has not resigned from the party.

== Legal issues ==
Yadav and his sister, Justice Nirmal Yadav of Punjab and Haryana High Court, were accused of influencing a land deal in Solan, Himachal Pradesh in 2008 by putting undue pressure on Panchkula Tehsildar Satish Kumar to issue residence certificate without proper documents. Official inquiries supported claims of impropriety, which Yadav denied.
