= Krishan Kumar (Bawal politician) =

Indian politician

Krishan Kumar (born 1969) is an Indian doctor and politician from Haryana. He is a member of the Haryana Legislative Assembly from Bawal Assembly constituency, which is reserved for Scheduled Caste community, in Rewari district, on the Delhi Jaipur National Highway and about 15 km from the district headquarters. He won the 2024 Haryana Legislative Assembly election, representing the Bharatiya Janata Party.

== Early life and education ==
Krishan Kumar is from Kosli tehsil, Rewari district, Haryana. He is the son of Shri Munni Lal. He is an E.N.T. specialist. He completed his Master of Surgery (Ear, Nose and Throat) in 2004 at a college affiliated with (PGI) Pandit Bhagwat Dayal Sharma Post Graduate Institute of Medical Sciences, Rohtak, Haryana. He served as a Chief Medical Officer from 1993 in many districts and as a Civil Surgeon in Rewari. He was in the state government's medical service as a Director (Health Services) in 2025 when he took voluntary retirement a day before he was nominated by the BJP and entered politics as a greenhorn. His brother in law, Harinder Singh, who also took voluntary retirement form government service, won from Hodal (Palwal), also on the BJP ticket.

== Career ==
Kumar is a first time MLA winning the Bawal Assembly constituency representing the Bharatiya Janata Party in the 2024 Haryana Legislative Assembly election. He polled 86,858 votes and defeated his nearest rival, ML Ranga of the Indian National Congress, by a margin of 20,011 votes. He is known as a loyalist of union minister Rao Inderjit Singh, and was given the ticket by the BJP ahead of two-time MLA and former minister in Saini government, Banwari Lal.
