= Banwari Lal (Haryana politician) =

Indian politician

Cabinet Minister Government of Haryana
- In office 14 November 2019 – 17 October 2024
- Ministry: Term
- Minister of Co-operation: 14 November 2019 - 17 October 2024
- Minister of Welfare of Scheduled Castes & Backward Classes: 14 November 2019 - 14 October 2024

Minister of State Government of Haryana
- In office 22 July 2016 – 27 October 2019
- Ministry: Term
- Minister of Public Health Engineering (Independent Charge): 22 July 2016 - 27 October 2019
- Minister of Renewable Energy: 22 July 2016 - 27 October 2019

Member of Haryana Legislative Assembly
- In office 2014–2024
- Preceded by: Rameshwar Dayal
- Succeeded by: Krishna Kumar
- Constituency: Bawal

Personal details
- Party: Bharatiya Janata Party
- Occupation: Politician

Banwari Lal is an Indian politician. He was elected to the Haryana Legislative Assembly from Bawal in the 2019 Haryana Legislative Assembly election as a member of the Bharatiya Janta Party.
