= Mukesh Sharma (Haryana politician) =

Indian politician

Member of Haryana Legislative Assembly
- Incumbent
- Assumed office 8 October 2024
- Preceded by: Sudhir Singla
- Constituency: Gurgaon

Personal details
- Party: Bharatiya Janata Party
- Profession: Politician

Mukesh Sharma is an Indian politician from Haryana. He is a Member of the Haryana Legislative Assembly from 2024, representing Gurgaon Assembly constituency as a Member of the Bharatiya Janata Party.

== Electoral record ==
Year	Election	Party	Constituency Name	Result	Votes gained	Vote share%
2009	13th Haryana Assembly	Bharatiya Janata Party	Badshahpur	Lost	15,163	10.37%
2014	14th Haryana Assembly	Independent	Badshahpur	Lost	35,297	16.22%
2024	16th Haryana Assembly	Bharatiya Janata Party	Gurgaon	Won	1,22,615	53.29%

== See also ==
- 2024 Haryana Legislative Assembly election
- Haryana Legislative Assembly
