= 2019 Haryana Legislative Assembly election =

Assembly election in Haryana

- 21 October 2019

All 90 seats in the Haryana Legislative Assembly 46 seats needed for a majority
- Turnout: 68.30% (▼8.34%)
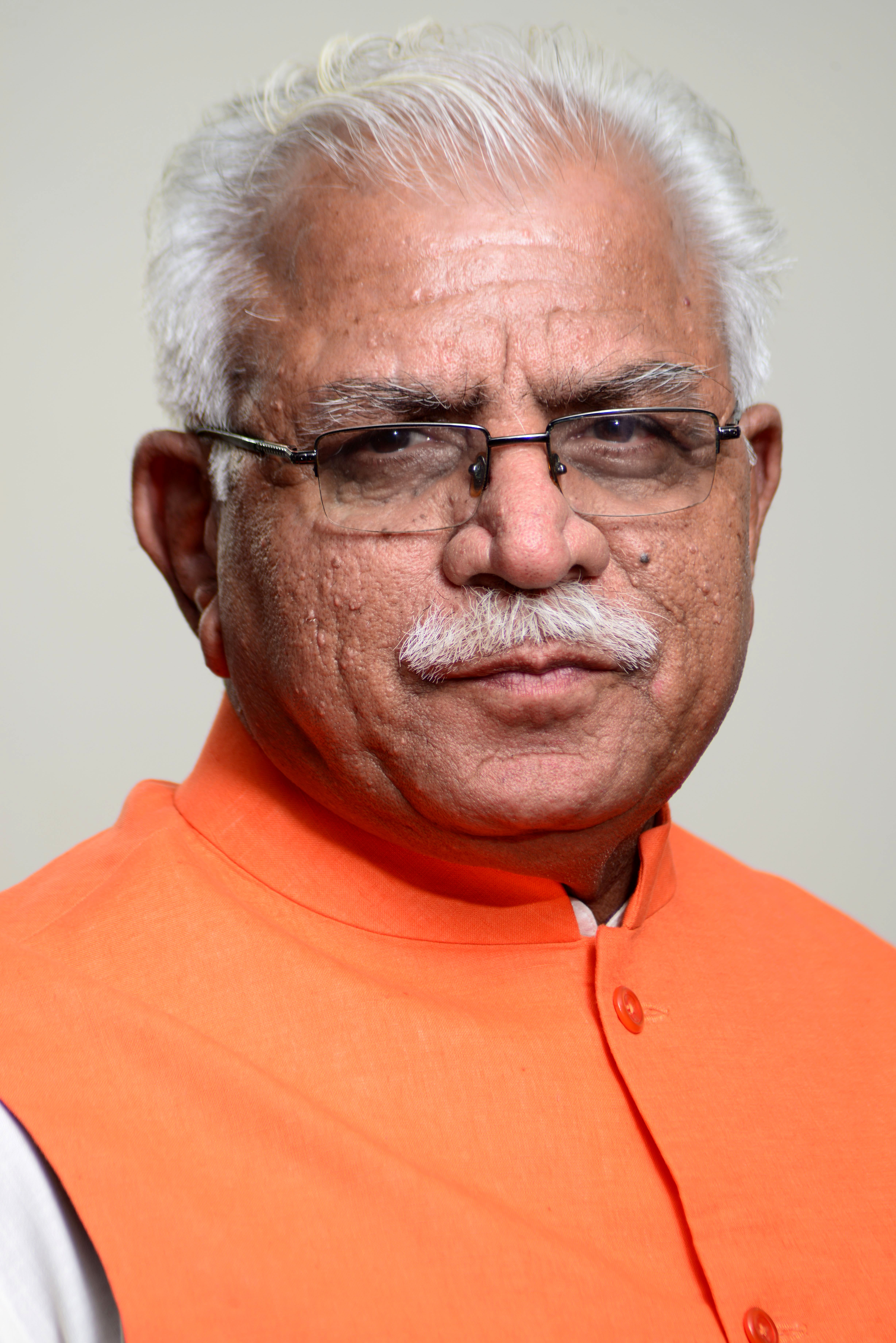

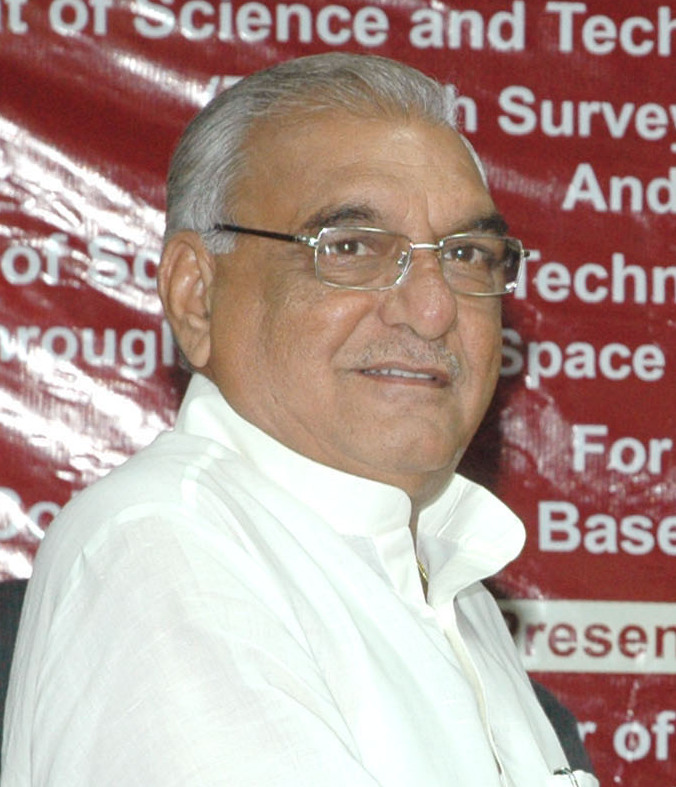

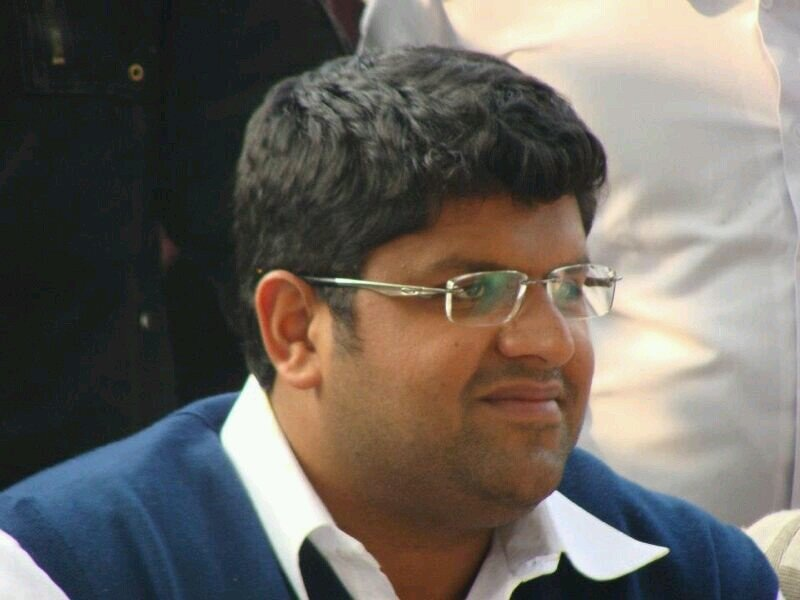

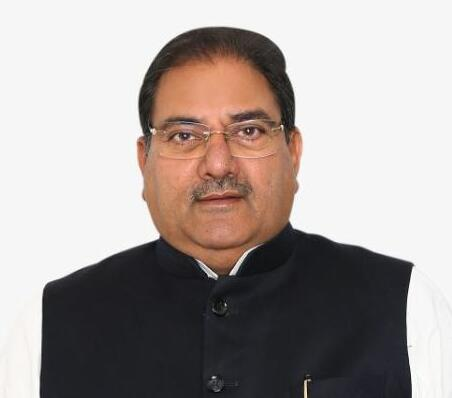
| | Majority party | Minority party |
|---|---|---|
| Leader | Manohar Lal Khattar | Bhupinder Singh Hooda |
| Party | BJP | INC |
| Alliance | NDA | UPA |
| Leader since | 2014 | 2000 |
| Leader's seat | Karnal | Garhi Sampla- Kiloi |
| Last election | 33.20%, 47 seats | 20.58%, 15 seats |
| Seats won | 40 | 31 |
| Seat change | ▼7 | ▲16 |
| Percentage | 36.49% | 28.08% |
| Swing | ▲3.29% | ▲7.50% |
| | Third party | Fourth party |
| Leader | Dushyant Chautala | Abhay Singh Chautala |
| Party | JJP | INLD |
| Alliance | - | - |
| Leader since | 2018 | 2014 |
| Leader's seat | Uchana Kalan | Ellenabad |
| Last election | New | 24.11%, 19 seats |
| Seats won | 10 | 1 |
| Seat change | ▲10 | ▼18 |
| Percentage | 14.8% | 2.44% |
| Swing | ▲14.8% | ▼21.67% |
- Seatwise Result Map of the election

- Structure of the Haryana Legislative Assembly after the election
Chief Minister before election
Manohar Lal Khattar
BJP
Elected Chief Minister
Manohar Lal Khattar
BJP

Legislative Assembly election was held in the Indian state of Haryana on 21 October 2019 to elect all 90 members of the Haryana Legislative Assembly. The final voter turnout was recorded at 68.20%. The results were announced on 24 October 2019.

The Bharatiya Janata Party emerged as the single largest party and formed the government in a post-poll alliance with the Jannayak Janta Party and seven Independent MLAs. BJP's Manohar Lal Khattar and JJP President Dushyant Chautala were sworn in as Chief Minister and Deputy Chief Minister respectively of the BJP-JJP alliance government.

In the previous election in 2014, the Bharatiya Janata Party had won a majority and ended the 10-year rule of the Congress government in the state and Manohar Lal Khattar became the Chief Minister.

== Elections ==
=== Schedule ===
| Poll Event | Haryana |
|---|---|
| Notification date | 27 September 2019 |
| Last Date for filing Nominations | 4 October 2019 |
| Scrutiny of Nominations | 5 October 2019 |
| Last date for withdrawal of Candidature | 7 October 2019 |
| Date of Poll | 21 October 2019 |
| Counting of Votes | 24 October 2019 |
Source: Business Today

=== Voter turnout ===
After the final count the turnout was updated to 68.20%. Fatehabad 73.7%, Kaithal 73.3%, Jagadhari 73%, and Hathin 72.5% had highest turnout. Gurugram 51.2%, Badkhal 51.3%, and Tigaon 53.2% had lowest turnout of just above 50%.

== Parties and alliances ==
=== National Democratic Alliance ===
| No. | Party | Flag | Symbol | Photo | Leader | Seats contested |
|---|---|---|---|---|---|---|
| 1. | Bharatiya Janata Party | | | | Manohar Lal Khattar | 90 |

=== United Progressive Alliance ===
| No. | Party | Flag | Symbol | Photo | Leader | Seats contested |
|---|---|---|---|---|---|---|
| 1. | Indian National Congress | | | | Bhupinder Singh Hooda | 90 |

=== Jannayak Janata Party ===
| No. | Party | Flag | Symbol | Photo | Leader | Seats contested |
|---|---|---|---|---|---|---|
| 1. | Jannayak Janata Party | | | | Dushyant Chautala | 87 |

=== INLD-SAD Alliance ===
| No. | Party | Flag | Symbol | Photo | Leader | Seats contested |
|---|---|---|---|---|---|---|
| 1. | Indian National Lok Dal | | | | Abhay Singh Chautala | 81 |
| 2. | Shiromani Akali Dal | | | | | 3 |

== List of Candidates ==
| Constituency | | BJP | | INC | | JJP | | INLD+ | |
| No. | Name | Party | Candidate | Party | Candidate | Party | Candidate | Party | Candidate |
|---|---|---|---|---|---|---|---|---|---|
| 1 | Kalka | BJP | Latika Sharma | INC | Pardeep Chaudhary | JJP | Kiran Chaudhary | INLD | Satinder Singh |
| 2 | Panchkula | BJP | Gian Chand Gupta | INC | Chander Mohan | JJP | Ajay Gautam | INLD | Karundeep Chaudhary |
| 3 | Naraingarh | BJP | Surender Singh | INC | Shalley | JJP | Ram Singh Dhillon | INLD | Jagmal Singh Rolloyo |
| 4 | Ambala Cantt. | BJP | Anil Vij | INC | Venu Singla | Did not contest | | Did not contest | |
| 5 | Ambala City | BJP | Aseem Goel Naneola | INC | Jasbir Mallour | JJP | Harpal Singh Kamboj | Did not contest | |
| 6 | Mulana (SC) | BJP | Rajbir Singh | INC | Varun Chaudhary | JJP | Amar Nath | INLD | Daya Rani |
| 7 | Sadhaura (SC) | BJP | Balwant Singh | INC | Renu Bala | JJP | Dr. Kusum Sherwal | INLD | Sushma Devi |
| 8 | Jagadhri | BJP | Kanwar Pal | INC | Akram Khan | JJP | Arjun Singh | INLD | Baljeet Sharma |
| 9 | Yamunanagar | BJP | Ghanshyam Dass | INC | Nirmal Chauhan | JJP | Salesh Tyagi | INLD | Dilbag Singh |
| 10 | Radaur | BJP | Karan Dev | INC | Bishan Lal | JJP | Manga Ram | INLD | Rajbeer |
| 11 | Ladwa | BJP | Dr. Pawan Saini | INC | Mewa Singh | JJP | Dr. Santosh Dahiya | INLD | Sapna Barshami |
| 12 | Shahbad | BJP | Krishan Kumar | INC | Anil Kumar Dhantori | JJP | Ram Karan | INLD | Sandeep Kumar |
| 13 | Thanesar | BJP | Subhash Sudha | INC | Ashok Kumar Arora | JJP | Yogesh Kumar | INLD | Kalawati |
| 14 | Pehowa | BJP | Sandeep Singh | INC | Mandeep Singh Chattha | JJP | Randhir Singh | INLD | Manjit Singh |
| 15 | Guhla (SC) | BJP | Para Ram Alias Ravi Taranwali | INC | Chaudhary Dilu Ram | JJP | Ishwar Singh | SAD | Ram Kumar Valmiki |
| 16 | Kalayat | BJP | Kamlesh Dhanda | INC | Jai Parkash | JJP | Satvinder Singh | INLD | Om Parkash |
| 17 | Kaithal | BJP | Leela Ram | INC | Randeep Singh Surjewala | JJP | Ramphal Malik | INLD | Anil Kumar |
| 18 | Pundri | BJP | Vedpal Advocate | INC | Satbir Bhana | JJP | Rajesh Kumar (Raju Dhull Pai) | INLD | Gian Singh |
| 19 | Nilokheri (SC) | BJP | Bhagwan Dass | INC | Banta Ram | JJP | Bhim Singh Jalala | INLD | Sonika Gill |
| 20 | Indri | BJP | Ram Kumar | INC | Dr. Navjot Kashyap | JJP | Gurdev Singh | INLD | Pardeep Kamboj |
| 21 | Karnal | BJP | Manohar Lal | INC | Tarlochan Singh | JJP | Tej Bahadur | Did not contest | |
| 22 | Gharaunda | BJP | Harvinder Kalyan | INC | Anil Kumar | JJP | Umed Singh Kashyap | INLD | Maninder Rana |
| 23 | Assandh | BJP | Bakhshish Singh Virk | INC | Shamsher Singh Gogi | JJP | Brij Sharma | INLD | Dharmvir Padha |
| 24 | Panipat Rural | BJP | Mahipal Dhanda | INC | Om Parkash Jain | JJP | Devender Kadian | INLD | Kuldeep Rathee |
| 25 | Panipat City | BJP | Parmod Kumar Vij | INC | Sanjay Aggarwal | JJP | Jaidev Naultha | INLD | Suresh Saini |
| 26 | Israna (SC) | BJP | Krishan Lal Panwar | INC | Balbir Singh | JJP | Dayanand Urlana | INLD | Ravi Kalsan Bandh |
| 27 | Samalkha | BJP | Shashi Kant Kaushik | INC | Dharam Singh Chhoker | JJP | Brham Pal Rawal | INLD | Prem Lata |
| 28 | Ganaur | BJP | Nirmal Rani | INC | Kuldip Sharma | JJP | Randhir Singh Malik | INLD | Bijender Shekhpura |
| 29 | Rai | BJP | Mohan Lal Badoli | INC | Jai Tirath | JJP | Ajit Antil | INLD | Inderjit |
| 30 | Kharkhauda (SC) | BJP | Meena Rani | INC | Jaiveer Singh | JJP | Pawan Kumar | INLD | Vinod |
| 31 | Sonipat | BJP | Kavita Jain | INC | Surender Panwar | JJP | Amit | INLD | Balkishan Sharma |
| 32 | Gohana | BJP | Tirath Rana | INC | Jagbir Singh Malik | JJP | Kuldeep Malik | INLD | Om Parkash |
| 33 | Baroda | BJP | Yogeshwar Dutt | INC | Sri Krishan Hooda | JJP | Bhupinder Malik | INLD | Joginder |
| 34 | Julana | BJP | Parminder Singh Dhull | INC | Dharmender Singh Dhull | JJP | Amarjeet Dhanda | INLD | Amit Malik Nidani |
| 35 | Safidon | BJP | Bachan Singh Arya | INC | Subhash Gangoli | JJP | Dayanand Kundu | INLD | Joginder Kalwa |
| 36 | Jind | BJP | Dr. Krishan Lal Middha | INC | Anshul Singla | JJP | Mahabir Gupta | INLD | Vijender Kumar |
| 37 | Uchana kalan | BJP | Prem Lata | INC | Bal Ram | JJP | Dushyant Chautala | INLD | Satpal |
| 38 | Narwana (SC) | BJP | Santosh Rani | INC | Vidya Rani Danoda | JJP | Ram Niwas | INLD | Sushil Kumar |
| 39 | Tohana | BJP | Subhash Barala | INC | Paramvir Singh | JJP | Devender Singh Babli | INLD | Rajpal Saini |
| 40 | Fatehabad | BJP | Dura Ram | INC | Prahlad Singh Gillan Khera | JJP | Dr. Virender Siwatch | INLD | Suman Lata |
| 41 | Ratia (SC) | BJP | Lakshman Napa | INC | Jarnail Singh | JJP | Manju Bala | SAD | Kulvinder Singh |
| 42 | Kalawali (SC) | BJP | Balkaur Singh | INC | Shishpal Singh | JJP | Nirmal Singh Malri | SAD | Rajinder Singh Desujodha |
| 43 | Dabwali | BJP | Aditya | INC | Amit Sihag | JJP | Saravjit Singh Masitan | INLD | Dr. Sita Ram |
| 44 | Rania | BJP | Ram Chand Kamboj | INC | Vineet Kamboj | JJP | Kuldeep Singh | INLD | Ashok Kumar Verma |
| 45 | Sirsa | BJP | Pardeep Ratusaria | INC | Hoshiari Lal | JJP | Rajender Ganeriwala | Did not contest | |
| 46 | Ellenabad | BJP | Pawan Beniwal | INC | Bharat Singh Beniwal | JJP | O. P. Sihag | INLD | Abhay Singh Chautala |
| 47 | Adampur | BJP | Sonali Phogat | INC | Kuldeep Bishnoi | JJP | Ramesh Kumar | INLD | Rajesh Godara |
| 48 | Uklana (SC) | BJP | Asha Khedar | INC | Bala Devi | JJP | Anoop Dhanak | INLD | Lalita Taank |
| 49 | Narnaund | BJP | Captain Abhimanyu | INC | Baljeet Sihag | JJP | Ram Kumar Gautam | INLD | Jassi Petwar |
| 50 | Hansi | BJP | Vinod Bhayana | INC | Om Prakash | JJP | Rahul Makkar | INLD | Kulbir Singh |
| 51 | Barwala | BJP | Surender Punia | INC | Bhupender Gangwa | JJP | Jogi Ram Sihag | INLD | Raghuvinder Khokha |
| 52 | Hisar | BJP | Dr. Kamal Gupta | INC | Ram Niwas Rara | JJP | Jitender Sheoran Manav | INLD | Pramod Bagri (Valmiki) |
| 53 | Nalwa | BJP | Ranbir Gangwa | INC | Randhir Panihar | JJP | Virender Choudhary | INLD | Satpal Kajla |
| 54 | Loharu | BJP | Jai Parkash Dalal | INC | Somvir Singh | JJP | Alka Arya | INLD | Raj Singh Gagarwas |
| 55 | Badhra | BJP | Sukhwinder | INC | Ranbir Singh Mahendra | JJP | Naina Singh | INLD | Vijay Kumar |
| 56 | Dadri | BJP | Babita Kumari | INC | Major Nirpender Singh Sangwan | JJP | Satpal Sangwan | INLD | Nitin Pal Janghu |
| 57 | Bhiwani | BJP | Ghanshyam Saraf | INC | Amar Singh Haluwasia | JJP | Dr. Shiv Shanker Bhardwaj | INLD | Anil Kathpalia |
| 58 | Tosham | BJP | Shashi Ranjan Parmar | INC | Kiran Choudhry | JJP | Sita Ram | INLD | Kamla Rani |
| 59 | Bawani Khera (SC) | BJP | Bishamber Singh | INC | Ramkishan Fauji | JJP | Ram Singh Vaid | INLD | Dharam Devi |
| 60 | Meham | BJP | Shamsher Kharkara | INC | Anand Singh Dangi | JJP | Hargian Mokhra | Did not contest | |
| 61 | Garhi Sampla-Kiloi | BJP | Satish Nandal | INC | Bhupinder Singh Hooda | JJP | Dr. Sandeep Hooda | INLD | Krishan |
| 62 | Rohtak | BJP | Manish Kumar Grover | INC | Bharat Bhushan Batra | JJP | Rajesh Saini | INLD | Puneet |
| 63 | Kalanaur (SC) | BJP | Ramavtar Balmiki | INC | Shakuntla Khatak | JJP | Rajender Valmiki | INLD | Baljraj Khasa Bhalli |
| 64 | Bahadurgarh | BJP | Naresh Kaushik | INC | Rajinder Singh Joon | JJP | Sanjay Dalal | INLD | Nafe Singh Rathee |
| 65 | Badli | BJP | Omprakash Dhankhar | INC | Kuldeep Vats | JJP | Sanjay Kablana | INLD | Mahabir Gulia |
| 66 | Jhajjar (SC) | BJP | Rakesh Kumar | INC | Geeta Bhukkal | JJP | Naseeb Kumar | INLD | Jogender Singh |
| 67 | Beri | BJP | Vikram Kadian | INC | Dr. Raghuvir Singh Kadian | JJP | Upender Kadian | INLD | Om Pahlawan |
| 68 | Ateli | BJP | Sitaram | INC | Arjun Singh | JJP | Samrat | INLD | Neetu Yadav |
| 69 | Mahendragarh | BJP | Ram Bilas Sharma | INC | Rao Dan Singh | JJP | Foji Rao Ramesh Palri | INLD | Rajender Singh |
| 70 | Narnaul | BJP | Om Prakash Yadav | INC | Narender Singh | JJP | Kamlesh Saini | INLD | Rajesh Kumar |
| 71 | Nangal chaudhry | BJP | Dr. Abhe Singh Yadav | INC | Raja Ram | JJP | Mula Ram | INLD | Suman Devi |
| 72 | Bawal (SC) | BJP | Dr. Banwari Lal | INC | Dr. M.L. Ranga | JJP | Shyam Sunder Sabharwal | INLD | Sampat Ram Dahanwal |
| 73 | Kosli | BJP | Laxman Singh Yadav | INC | Yaduvender Singh | JJP | Ramphal S/o Richhpal | INLD | Kiran Pal Yadav |
| 74 | Rewari | BJP | Sunil Kumar | INC | Chiranjeev Rao | JJP | Malkhan Singh | INLD | Kamla Devi |
| 75 | Pataudi (SC) | BJP | Satya Parkash | INC | Sudhir Kumar | JJP | Deep Chand | INLD | Sukhbir Tanwar |
| 76 | Badshahpur | BJP | Manish Yadav | INC | Rao Kamalbir Singh (Mintu) | JJP | Rishi Raj Rana | INLD | Sonu Thakran |
| 77 | Gurgaon | BJP | Sudhir Singla | INC | Sukhbir Kataria | JJP | Sube Singh Bohra | INLD | Birham Parkash Jangra Advocate |
| 78 | Sohna | BJP | Sanjay Singh | INC | Shamsuddin | JJP | Rohtas Singh | INLD | Rohtash |
| 79 | Nuh | BJP | Zakir Hussain | INC | Aftab Ahmed | JJP | Tayyab Hussain | INLD | Nasir Husain |
| 80 | Ferozepur Jhirka | BJP | Naseem Ahmed | INC | Mamman Khan | JJP | Aman Ahmed | INLD | Ayyub Khan |
| 81 | Punahana | BJP | Nauksham Chaudhary | INC | Mohd Ilyas | JJP | Iqbal | INLD | Subhan Khan |
| 82 | Hathin | BJP | Praveen Dagar | INC | Mohammad Israil | JJP | Harsh Kumar | INLD | Rani Devi |
| 83 | Hodal (SC) | BJP | Jagdish Nayar | INC | Udai Bhan | JJP | Yashveer | INLD | Ram Pal |
| 84 | Palwal | BJP | Deepak Mangla | INC | Karan Singh | JJP | Gaya Lal | INLD | Satpal |
| 85 | Prithla | BJP | Sohan Pal | INC | Raghubir Tewatia | Did not contest | | INLD | Narender Singh |
| 86 | Faridabad NIT | BJP | Nagender Bhadana | INC | Neeraj Sharma | JJP | Tejpal | INLD | Jagjit Pannu |
| 87 | Badkhal | BJP | Seema Trikha | INC | Vijay Pratap Singh | JJP | Islamudeen Pappu | INLD | Ajay Bhadana |
| 88 | Ballabhgarh | BJP | Mool Chand Sharma | INC | Anand Kaushik | Did not contest | | INLD | Rohtash |
| 89 | Faridabad | BJP | Narender Gupta | INC | Lakhan Kumar Singla | JJP | Kuldeep Tewatia | Did not contest | |
| 90 | Tigaon | BJP | Rajesh Nagar | INC | Lalit Nagar S/o Sh. Bharat Singh | JJP | Pardeep Chaudhary | INLD | Umesh Bhati |

== Surveys and Polls ==
=== Vote share ===
| Publishing Date | Polling Agency | | | |
| Publishing Date | Polling Agency | NDA | UPA | Others |
| 26 September 2019 | ABP News – C Voter | 46 % | 22% | 32% |
| 18 October 2019 | IANS – C Voter | 47.5 % | 21.4 % | 30.7% |

=== Best Choice for Chief Minister ===
| Publishing Date | Polling Agency | | | | | | | | | | | |
| Publishing Date | Polling Agency | Manohar Lal Khattar | Bhupinder Singh Hooda | Dushyant Chautala | Ashok Tanwar | Abhay Chautala | Deepender Hooda | Om Prakash Chautala | Kuldeep Bishnoi | Naveen Jaihind | others | can't say |
| 26 September 2019 | ABP News – C Voter | 48.1 % | 12.6% | 11.1% | 4.3 | 1.7 | 1.3 | 1 | 0.7 | 0.4 | 12.8 | 5.9 |

=== Seat Projections ===
| Poll type | Publishing Date | Polling Agency | | | | Majority |
| Poll type | Publishing Date | Polling Agency | NDA | UPA | Others | Majority |
| Opinion polls | 26 September 2019 | ABP News-CVoter | 78 | 08 | 04 | 33 |
| Opinion polls | 26 September 2019 | Patriotic Voter | 51 | 25 | 14 | 11 |
| Opinion polls | 27 September 2019 | NewsX – Pollstrat | 76 | 06 | 08 | 31 |
| Opinion polls | 17 October 2019 | Republic - Jan Ki Baat | 58-70 | 12-15 | 5-8 | 13-25 |
| Opinion polls | 18 October 2019 | ABP-CVoter | 83 | 3 | 4 | 38 |
| Opinion polls | 18 October 2019 | IANS-CVoter | 79-87 | 1-7 | – | 34-42 |
| Exit polls | | India Today - Axis | 32-44 | 30-42 | 6-10 | HUNG |
| Exit polls | | TV9 - Bharatvarsh | 47 | 23 | 20 | 2 |
| Exit polls | | News18 - IPSOS | 75 | 10 | 5 | 30 |
| Exit polls | | Patriotic Voter | 46 | 26 | 18 | 1 |
| Exit polls | | Republic Media - Jan Ki Baat | 52-63 | 15-19 | 12-18 | 7-18 |
| Exit polls | | ABP News - C Voter | 72 | 8 | 10 | 27 |
| Exit polls | | NewsX - Pollstrat | 75-80 | 9-12 | 1-4 | 30-35 |
| Exit polls | | Times Now | 77 | 11 | 8 | 32 |

== Detailed Results ==
Vote Share
1. BJP (36.5%)
2. INC (28.1%)
3. JJP (14.8%)
4. BSP (4.21%)
5. INLD (2.44%)
6. Independent (9.17%)
7. Other (4.77%)

| Parties and coalitions | Popular vote | | | Seats | |
| Parties and coalitions | Votes | % | ±pp | Won | +/− |
|---|---|---|---|---|---|
| Bharatiya Janata Party | 4,569,016 | 36.49% | ▲3.39 | 40 | ▼7 |
| Indian National Congress | 3,515,498 | 28.08% | ▲7.55 | 31 | ▲16 |
| Jannayak Janata Party | 1,858,033 | 14.80% | New | 10 | ▲10 |
| Indian National Lok Dal | 305,486 | 2.44% | ▼21.67 | 1 | ▼18 |
| Haryana Lokhit Party | 81,641 | 0.66% | ▼0.56 | 1 | ▲1 |
| Bahujan Samaj Party | 518,812 | 4.21% | ▼0.16 | 0 | ▼1 |
| Shiromani Akali Dal | 47,336 | 0.38% | ▼0.24 | 0 | ▼1 |
| Independents | 1,129,942 | 9.17% | ▲6.34 | 7 | ▲2 |
| None of the Above | 65,270 | 0.53% | | | |
| Total | 12,520,177 | 100.00 | | 90 | ±0 |
| Valid votes | 12,520,177 | 99.85 | | | |
| Invalid votes | 19,076 | 0.15 | | | |
| Votes turnout | 12,539,253 | 68.20 | | | |
| Abstentions | 5,847,429 | 31.80 | | | |
| Registered voters | 18,386,682 | | | | |

=== Democratic Standards ===
==== Performance of the political parties ====
During the election campaign, BJP had given the slogan of "75+" i.e. BJP will win more than 75 seats out of 90 seats in Haryana. But, BJP couldn't fulfill its target and it even lost the majority in the Legislative Assembly.

The INC emerged as the big gainer in the election. INC fought the election under the leadership of Selja Kumari and former chief minister Bhupinder Singh Hooda. Though INC couldn't reach the majority mark of 46 seats, it gained 15 seats in comparison to the previous election and won 30 seats.

==== Barrier to entry and politics of rich ====
83.3% (75 out of 90) are crorepati, that is, they own assets worth at least ₹10,000,000. Average worth of 2019 assembly members is ₹18.29 crore compare to ₹12.97 crore in 2014. 93.5% of INC (29 of 31), 92.5% of BJP (37 of 40), and 70% of JJP (7 of 10) are crorepati. With ₹25.26 crore per MLA, the average wealth of JJP is highest.

==== Criminality ====
Association for Democratic Reforms (ADR), a think tank which does poll analysis for accountability and transparency in democracy, found that the 13.3% (12 of 90) elected MLAs face criminal cases, highest being 4 from INC, followed by 2 from BJP, 1 from JJP, and rest being independent or single MLA parties.

==== Dynastism and nepotism ====
Dynasts had field day in the election results, several dynasts across various parties won elections.

Highest number of dynasts won from INC, namely Bhupinder Singh Hooda from Ranbir Singh Hooda, Kiran Choudhry from Bansi Lal clan, Kuldeep Bishnoi from Bhajan Lal clan, Chiranjeev Rao from Ajay Singh Yadav clan, Varun Chaudhary from Phool Chand Mullana; as well as Rao Dan Singh related to Rao Narbir Singh Aftab Ahmed, son of 5 time MLA, Khurshid Ahmed, Amit Sihag Chautala is another dynast who became INC MLA from Dabwali, he is grandson of Devi Lal.

Dynasts who won from BJP are Dura Ram of Bhajan Lal clan.

Highest number of winning dynasts were from the Devi Lal's Chautala clan which had fielded 6 family members from different parties and 5 of them won including Dushyant Chautala and his mother Naina Singh Chautala from JJP, Abhay Singh Chautala from INLD, and INC rebel Ranjit Singh Chautala as independent candidate; as well as Amit Sihag Chautala from Dabwali as INC MLA. This was followed by 2 from Bhajan Lal clan, namely Kuldeep Bishnoi and Dura Ram. Lone HLP party MLA Gopal Kanda is also from political family as his father too had contested General Elections in the past on Jan Sangh ticket.

==== Lack of female empowerment ====
Only 9 (10% of total legislature membership) female candidate were elected, 4 from Congress, 3 from BJP, 1 from JJP and 1 independent.

==== Educational standards of candidates ====
According to ADR report, only 69% (62 of 90) have at least a bachelor's degree, i.e. 31% lack even the basic degree,

== Results by district ==
| Division | District | Seats | | | | |
| Division | District | Seats | BJP | INC | JJP | OTH |
| Ambala | Panchkula | 2 | 1 | 1 | —N/a | —N/a |
| Ambala | Ambala | 4 | 2 | 2 | —N/a | —N/a |
| Ambala | Yamunanagar | 4 | 2 | 2 | —N/a | —N/a |
| Ambala | Kurukshetra | 4 | 2 | 1 | 1 | —N/a |
| Karnal | Kaithal | 4 | 2 | —N/a | 1 | 1 |
| Karnal | Karnal | 5 | 3 | 1 | —N/a | 1 |
| Karnal | Panipat | 4 | 2 | 2 | —N/a | —N/a |
| Rohtak | Sonipat | 6 | 2 | 4 | —N/a | —N/a |
| Rohtak | Bhiwani | 4 | 3 | 1 | —N/a | —N/a |
| Rohtak | Charkhi Dadri | 2 | —N/a | —N/a | 1 | 1 |
| Rohtak | Rohtak | 4 | —N/a | 3 | —N/a | 1 |
| Rohtak | Jhajjar | 4 | —N/a | 4 | —N/a | —N/a |
| Hisar | Jind | 5 | 1 | 1 | 3 | —N/a |
| Hisar | Fatehabad | 3 | 2 | —N/a | 1 | —N/a |
| Hisar | Sirsa | 5 | —N/a | 2 | —N/a | 3 |
| Hisar | Hisar | 7 | 3 | 1 | 3 | —N/a |
| Gurgaon | Mahendragarh | 4 | 3 | 1 | —N/a | —N/a |
| Gurgaon | Rewari | 3 | 2 | 1 | —N/a | —N/a |
| Gurgaon | Gurgaon | 4 | 3 | —N/a | —N/a | 1 |
| Faridabad | Nuh | 3 | —N/a | 3 | —N/a | —N/a |
| Faridabad | Palwal | 3 | 3 | —N/a | —N/a | —N/a |
| Faridabad | Faridabad | 6 | 4 | 1 | —N/a | 1 |
| Total | | 90 | 40 | 31 | 10 | 9 |

== Results by constituency ==
| Constituency | | Winner | | | | Runner-up | | | | Margin | |
| Constituency | | Candidate | Party | Votes | % | Candidate | Party | Votes | % | Votes | % |
|---|---|---|---|---|---|---|---|---|---|---|---|
| 1 | Kalka | Pardeep Chaudhary | INC | 57,948 | 45.26 | Latika Sharma | BJP | 52,017 | 40.63 | 5,931 | 4.63 |
| 2 | Panchkula | Gian Chand Gupta | BJP | 61,537 | 48.84 | Chander Mohan | INC | 55,904 | 44.37 | 5,633 | 4.47 |
| 3 | Naraingarh | Shalley Chaudhary | INC | 53,470 | 39.56 | Surender Singh | BJP | 32,870 | 24.32 | 20,600 | 15.24 |
| 4 | Ambala Cantt. | Anil Vij | BJP | 64,571 | 53.04 | Chitra Sarwara | IND | 44,406 | 36.48 | 20,165 | 16.56 |
| 5 | Ambala City | Aseem Goel | BJP | 64,896 | 42.20 | Nirmal Singh Mohra | IND | 55,944 | 36.38 | 8,952 | 5.82 |
| 6 | Mulana (SC) | Varun Chaudhary | INC | 67,051 | 43.60 | Rajbir Singh | BJP | 65,363 | 42.50 | 1,688 | 1.10 |
| 7 | Sadhaura (SC) | Renu Bala | INC | 65,806 | 40.01 | Balwant Singh | BJP | 48,786 | 29.66 | 17,020 | 10.35 |
| 8 | Jagadhri | Kanwar Pal | BJP | 66,376 | 38.88 | Akram Khan | INC | 50,003 | 29.29 | 16,373 | 9.59 |
| 9 | Yamunanagar | Ghanshyam Dass | BJP | 64,848 | 43.02 | Dilbag Singh | INLD | 63,393 | 42.05 | 1,455 | 0.97 |
| 10 | Radaur | Bishan Lal Saini | INC | 54,087 | 38.05 | Karan Dev | BJP | 51,546 | 36.26 | 2,541 | 1.79 |
| 11 | Ladwa | Mewa Singh Singroha | INC | 57,665 | 41.86 | Dr. Pawan Saini | BJP | 45,028 | 32.69 | 12,637 | 9.17 |
| 12 | Shahbad | Ram Karan | JJP | 69,233 | 55.35 | Krishan Kumar | BJP | 32,106 | 25.67 | 37,127 | 29.68 |
| 13 | Thanesar | Subhash Sudha | BJP | 55,759 | 43.03 | Ashok Kumar Arora | INC | 54,917 | 42.38 | 842 | 0.65 |
| 14 | Pehowa | Sandeep Singh | BJP | 42,613 | 34.69 | Mandeep Singh Chattha | INC | 37,299 | 30.36 | 5,314 | 4.33 |
| 15 | Guhla (SC) | Ishwar Singh | JJP | 36,518 | 27.82 | Chaudhary Dilu Ram | INC | 31,944 | 24.33 | 4,574 | 3.49 |
| 16 | Kalayat | Kamlesh Dhanda | BJP | 53,805 | 35.19 | Jai Parkash | INC | 44,831 | 29.32 | 8,974 | 5.87 |
| 17 | Kaithal | Leela Ram | BJP | 72,664 | 45.79 | Randeep Singh Surjewala | INC | 71,418 | 45.00 | 1,246 | 0.79 |
| 18 | Pundri | Randhir Singh Gollen | IND | 41,008 | 29.94 | Satbir Bhana | INC | 28,184 | 20.58 | 12,824 | 9.36 |
| 19 | Nilokheri (SC) | Dharam Pal Gonder | IND | 42,979 | 32.02 | Bhagwan Das KabirPanthi | BJP | 40,757 | 30.37 | 2,222 | 1.65 |
| 20 | Indri | Ram Kumar Kashyap | BJP | 54,221 | 38.01 | Rakesh Kamboj | IND | 46,790 | 32.80 | 7,431 | 5.21 |
| 21 | Karnal | Manohar Lal Khattar | BJP | 79,906 | 63.72 | Tarlochan Singh | INC | 34,718 | 27.68 | 45,188 | 36.04 |
| 22 | Gharaunda | Harvinder Kalyan | BJP | 67,209 | 46.71 | Anil Kumar | INC | 49,807 | 34.62 | 17,402 | 12.09 |
| 23 | Assandh | Shamsher Singh Gogi | INC | 32,114 | 20.94 | Narender Singh | BSP | 30,411 | 19.83 | 1,703 | 1.11 |
| 24 | Panipat Rural | Mahipal Dhanda | BJP | 67,086 | 40.77 | Devender Kadian | JJP | 45,125 | 27.42 | 21,961 | 13.35 |
| 25 | Panipat City | Parmod Kumar Vij | BJP | 76,863 | 62.84 | Sanjay Aggarwal | INC | 37,318 | 30.51 | 39,545 | 32.33 |
| 26 | Israna (SC) | Balbir Singh | INC | 61,376 | 48.21 | Krishan Lal Panwar | BJP | 41,361 | 32.49 | 20,015 | 15.72 |
| 27 | Samalkha | Dharam Singh Chhoker | INC | 81,898 | 52.16 | Shashi Kant Kaushik | BJP | 66,956 | 42.64 | 14,942 | 9.52 |
| 28 | Ganaur | Nirmal Rani | BJP | 57,830 | 48.33 | Kuldip Sharma | INC | 47,550 | 39.74 | 10,280 | 8.59 |
| 29 | Rai | Mohan Lal Badoli | BJP | 45,377 | 37.99 | Jai Tirath | INC | 42,715 | 35.76 | 2,662 | 2.23 |
| 30 | Kharkhauda (SC) | Jaiveer Singh | INC | 38,577 | 38.05 | Pawan Kharkhoda | JJP | 37,033 | 36.53 | 1,544 | 1.52 |
| 31 | Sonipat | Surender Panwar | INC | 79,438 | 59.51 | Kavita Jain | BJP | 46,560 | 34.88 | 32,878 | 24.63 |
| 32 | Gohana | Jagbir Singh Malik | INC | 39,531 | 33.39 | Raj Kumar Saini | LSP | 35,379 | 29.88 | 4,152 | 3.51 |
| 33 | Baroda | Krishan Hooda | INC | 42,566 | 34.67 | Yogeshwar Dutt | BJP | 37,726 | 30.73 | 4,840 | 3.94 |
| 34 | Julana | Amarjeet Dhanda | JJP | 61,942 | 49.01 | Parminder Singh Dhull | BJP | 37,749 | 29.87 | 24,193 | 19.14 |
| 35 | Safidon | Subhash Gangoli | INC | 57,468 | 42.28 | Bachan Singh Arya | BJP | 53,810 | 39.58 | 3,658 | 2.70 |
| 36 | Jind | Krishan Lal Middha | BJP | 58,370 | 47.20 | Mahabir Gupta | JJP | 45,862 | 37.09 | 12,508 | 10.11 |
| 37 | Uchana Kalan | Dushyant Chautala | JJP | 92,504 | 58.39 | Prem Lata | BJP | 45,052 | 28.44 | 47,452 | 29.95 |
| 38 | Narwana (SC) | Ramniwas Surjakhera | JJP | 79,578 | 51.91 | Santosh Rani | BJP | 48,886 | 31.89 | 30,692 | 20.02 |
| 39 | Tohana | Devender Singh Babli | JJP | 100,752 | 56.72 | Subhash Barala | BJP | 48,450 | 27.28 | 52,302 | 29.44 |
| 40 | Fatehabad | Dura Ram | BJP | 77,369 | 41.97 | Dr. Virender Siwatch | JJP | 74,069 | 40.18 | 3,300 | 1.79 |
| 41 | Ratia (SC) | Lakshman Napa | BJP | 55,160 | 34.97 | Jarnail Singh | INC | 53,944 | 34.20 | 1,216 | 0.77 |
| 42 | Kalawali (SC) | Shishpal Singh | INC | 53,059 | 39.76 | Rajinder Singh Desujodha | SAD | 33,816 | 25.34 | 19,243 | 14.42 |
| 43 | Dabwali | Amit Sihag | INC | 66,885 | 42.57 | Aditya Devilal | BJP | 51,238 | 32.61 | 15,647 | 9.96 |
| 44 | Rania | Ranjit Singh Chautala | IND | 53,825 | 37.48 | Gobind Kanda | HLP | 34,394 | 23.95 | 19,431 | 13.53 |
| 45 | Sirsa | Gopal Kanda | HLP | 44,915 | 31.65 | Gokul Setia | IND | 44,313 | 31.23 | 602 | 0.42 |
| 46 | Ellenabad | Abhay Singh Chautala | INLD | 57,055 | 37.86 | Pawan Beniwal | BJP | 45,133 | 29.95 | 11,922 | 7.91 |
| 47 | Adampur | Kuldeep Bishnoi | INC | 63,693 | 51.70 | Sonali Phogat | BJP | 34,222 | 27.78 | 29,471 | 23.92 |
| 48 | Uklana (SC) | Anoop Dhanak | JJP | 65,369 | 46.84 | Asha Khedar | BJP | 41,676 | 29.87 | 23,693 | 16.97 |
| 49 | Narnaund | Ram Kumar Gautam | JJP | 73,435 | 47.89 | Captain Abhimanyu | BJP | 61,406 | 40.04 | 12,029 | 7.85 |
| 50 | Hansi | Vinod Bhayana | BJP | 53,191 | 41.65 | Rahul Makkar | JJP | 30,931 | 24.22 | 22,260 | 17.43 |
| 51 | Barwala | Jogi Ram Sihag | JJP | 45,868 | 36.69 | Surender Punia | BJP | 41,960 | 33.56 | 3,908 | 3.13 |
| 52 | Hisar | Dr. Kamal Gupta | BJP | 49,675 | 50.39 | Ram Niwas Rara | INC | 33,843 | 34.33 | 15,832 | 16.06 |
| 53 | Nalwa | Ranbir Gangwa | BJP | 47,523 | 41.09 | Randhir Panihar | INC | 37,851 | 32.72 | 9,672 | 8.37 |
| 54 | Loharu | Jai Parkash Dalal | BJP | 61,365 | 44.02 | Somvir Singh | INC | 43,688 | 31.34 | 17,677 | 12.68 |
| 55 | Badhra | Naina Singh Chautala | JJP | 52,938 | 40.09 | Ranbir Singh Mahendra | INC | 39,234 | 29.72 | 13,704 | 10.37 |
| 56 | Dadri | Somveer Sangwan | IND | 43,849 | 34.66 | Satpal Sangwan | JJP | 29,577 | 23.38 | 14,272 | 11.28 |
| 57 | Bhiwani | Ghanshyam Saraf | BJP | 61,704 | 47.40 | Dr. Shiv Shanker Bhardwaj | JJP | 33,820 | 25.98 | 27,884 | 21.42 |
| 58 | Tosham | Kiran Choudhry | INC | 72,699 | 49.72 | Shashi Ranjan Parmar | BJP | 54,640 | 37.37 | 18,059 | 12.35 |
| 59 | Bawani Khera (SC) | Bishamber Singh | BJP | 52,387 | 38.51 | Ramkishan Fauji | INC | 41,492 | 30.50 | 10,895 | 8.01 |
| 60 | Meham | Balraj Kundu | IND | 49,418 | 35.39 | Anand Singh Dangi | INC | 37,371 | 26.76 | 12,047 | 8.63 |
| 61 | Garhi Sampla-Kiloi | Bhupinder Singh Hooda | INC | 97,755 | 65.82 | Satish Nandal | BJP | 39,443 | 26.56 | 58,312 | 39.26 |
| 62 | Rohtak | Bharat Bhushan Batra | INC | 50,437 | 43.93 | Manish Grover | BJP | 47,702 | 41.54 | 2,735 | 2.39 |
| 63 | Kalanaur (SC) | Shakuntla Khatak | INC | 62,151 | 46.53 | Ramavtar Balmiki | BJP | 51,527 | 38.58 | 10,624 | 7.95 |
| 64 | Bahadurgarh | Rajinder Singh Joon | INC | 55,825 | 40.77 | Naresh Kaushik | BJP | 40,334 | 29.45 | 15,491 | 11.32 |
| 65 | Badli | Kuldeep Vats | INC | 45,441 | 37.54 | Om Prakash Dhankar | BJP | 34,196 | 28.25 | 11,245 | 9.29 |
| 66 | Jhajjar (SC) | Geeta Bhukkal | INC | 46,480 | 41.80 | Rakesh Kumar | BJP | 31,481 | 28.31 | 14,999 | 13.49 |
| 67 | Beri | Raghuvir Singh Kadian | INC | 46,022 | 39.40 | Vikram Kadian | BJP | 33,070 | 28.31 | 12,952 | 11.09 |
| 68 | Ateli | Sitaram | BJP | 55,793 | 43.97 | Atar Lal | BSP | 37,387 | 29.46 | 18,406 | 14.51 |
| 69 | Mahendragarh | Rao Dan Singh | INC | 46,478 | 32.43 | Ram Bilas Sharma | BJP | 36,258 | 25.30 | 10,220 | 7.13 |
| 70 | Narnaul | Om Prakash Yadav | BJP | 42,732 | 43.21 | Kamlesh Saini | JJP | 28,017 | 28.33 | 14,715 | 14.88 |
| 71 | Nangal Chaudhry | Abhe Singh Yadav | BJP | 55,529 | 53.57 | Mula Ram | JJP | 34,914 | 33.68 | 20,615 | 19.89 |
| 72 | Bawal (SC) | Dr. Banwari Lal | BJP | 69,049 | 47.99 | Dr. M.L. Ranga | INC | 36,804 | 25.58 | 32,245 | 22.41 |
| 73 | Kosli | Laxman Singh Yadav | BJP | 78,813 | 52.42 | Yaduvender Singh | INC | 40,189 | 26.73 | 38,624 | 25.69 |
| 74 | Rewari | Chiranjeev Rao | INC | 43,870 | 27.82 | Sunil Kumar | BJP | 42,553 | 26.99 | 1,317 | 0.83 |
| 75 | Pataudi (SC) | Satya Prakash Jaravata | BJP | 60,633 | 44.20 | Narender Singh Pahari | IND | 24,054 | 17.53 | 36,579 | 26.67 |
| 76 | Badshahpur | Rakesh Daultabad | IND | 106,827 | 47.06 | Manish Yadav | BJP | 96,641 | 42.58 | 10,186 | 4.48 |
| 77 | Gurgaon | Sudhir Singla | BJP | 81,953 | 43.33 | Mohit Grover | IND | 48,638 | 25.72 | 33,315 | 17.61 |
| 78 | Sohna | Sanjay Singh | BJP | 59,117 | 36.16 | Rohtas Singh | JJP | 46,664 | 28.54 | 12,453 | 7.62 |
| 79 | Nuh | Chaudhary Aftab Ahmed | INC | 52,311 | 41.77 | Zakir Hussain | BJP | 48,273 | 38.55 | 4,038 | 3.22 |
| 80 | Ferozepur Jhirka | Mamman Khan | INC | 84,546 | 57.62 | Naseem Ahmed | BJP | 47,542 | 32.40 | 37,004 | 25.22 |
| 81 | Punahana | Chaudhary Mohammad Ilyas | INC | 35,092 | 28.76 | Rahish Khan | IND | 34,276 | 28.09 | 816 | 0.67 |
| 82 | Hathin | Praveen Dagar | BJP | 46,744 | 29.19 | Mohammad Israil | INC | 43,857 | 27.38 | 2,887 | 1.81 |
| 83 | Hodal (SC) | Jagdish Nayar | BJP | 55,864 | 45.80 | Udai Bhan | INC | 52,477 | 43.02 | 3,387 | 2.78 |
| 84 | Palwal | Deepak Mangla | BJP | 89,426 | 55.60 | Karan Singh Dalal | INC | 61,130 | 38.01 | 28,296 | 17.59 |
| 85 | Prithla | Nayan Pal Rawat | IND | 64,625 | 43.95 | Raghubir Tewatia | INC | 48,196 | 32.78 | 16,429 | 11.17 |
| 86 | Faridabad NIT | Neeraj Sharma | INC | 61,697 | 38.86 | Nagender Bhadana | BJP | 58,455 | 36.82 | 3,242 | 2.04 |
| 87 | Badkhal | Seema Trikha | BJP | 58,550 | 43.26 | Vijay Pratap Singh | INC | 56,005 | 41.38 | 2,545 | 1.88 |
| 88 | Ballabhgarh | Mool Chand Sharma | BJP | 66,708 | 54.42 | Anand Kaushik | INC | 24,995 | 20.39 | 41,713 | 34.03 |
| 89 | Faridabad | Narender Gupta | BJP | 65,887 | 54.41 | Lakhan Kumar Singla | INC | 44,174 | 36.48 | 21,713 | 17.93 |
| 90 | Tigaon | Rajesh Nagar | BJP | 97,126 | 57.38 | Lalit Nagar | INC | 63,285 | 37.39 | 33,841 | 19.99 |

== Bypolls (2019-2024) ==
| S.No | Date | Constituency | MLA before election | Party before election | Elected MLA | Party after election |
|---|---|---|---|---|---|---|
| 33 | 3 November 2020 | Baroda | Krishan Hooda | Indian National Congress | Indu Raj Narwal | Indian National Congress |
| 46 | 30 October 2021 | Ellenabad | Abhay Singh Chautala | Indian National Lok Dal | Abhay Singh Chautala | Indian National Lok Dal |
| 47 | 3 November 2022 | Adampur | Kuldeep Bishnoi | Indian National Congress | Bhavya Bishnoi | Bharatiya Janata Party |
| 21 | 25 May 2024 | Karnal | Manohar Lal Khattar | Bharatiya Janata Party | Nayab Singh Saini | Bharatiya Janata Party |

== See also ==
- 2019 Indian general election in Haryana
- 2019 Maharashtra Legislative Assembly election
- 2019 elections in India
- Elections in Haryana
- Political dynasties of Haryana and corruption
