= Badhra Assembly constituency =

Constituency of the Haryana legislative assembly in India

Coordinates: 28.51°N 75.94°E

- Constituency No. 55 for the Haryana Legislative Assembly

Constituency details
- Country: India
- Region: North India
- State: Haryana
- District: Charkhi Dadri
- Lok Sabha constituency: Bhiwani–Mahendragarh
- Established: 1967
- Total electors: 2,11,267
- Reservation: None

Member of Legislative Assembly
- 15th Haryana Legislative Assembly
- Incumbent Umed Singh Phogat
- Party: BJP
- Elected year: 2024

Badhra Assembly constituency is one of the 90 Legislative Assembly constituencies of Haryana state in northern India.

== Overview ==
Previously in Bhiwani district, Badhra became part of the new Charkhi Dadri district in 2016.

Badhra is part of Bhiwani-Mahendragarh Lok Sabha constituency along with eight other Assembly segments, namely, Dadri, Bhiwani, Tosham and Loharu in this district and Ateli, Mahendragarh, Narnaul and Nangal Chaudhry in Mahendragarh district.

== Members of Legislative Assembly ==
Year	Member	Party
1967	Attar Singh Sheoran	Independent
1968	Amir Singh Sangwan	Vishal Haryana Party
1972	Lajja Rani Sangwan	Indian National Congress
1977	Ran Singh Maan	Janata Party
1982	Chandrawati	Lok Dal
1987	Ran Singh Maan	Lok Dal
1991	Attar Singh Sheoran	Haryana Vikas Party
1996	Narpender Singh Sheoran	Haryana Vikas Party
2000	Ranbir Singh Mandola	Indian National Lok Dal
2005	Dharambir Singh Chaudhary	Indian National Congress
2009	Raghbir Singh Chhillar	Indian National Lok Dal
2014	Sukhvinder Sheoran	Bharatiya Janata Party
2019	Naina Singh Chautala	Jannayak Janata Party
2024	Umed Singh Phogat	Bharatiya Janata Party

== Election results ==
=== Assembly Election 2024 ===
2024 Haryana Legislative Assembly election: Badhra
Party	Candidate	Votes	%	±%
BJP	Umed Singh	59,315	41.17	▲16.05
INC	Somvir sheoran	51,730	35.90	▲6.19
Independent	Somveer Ghasola	26,730	18.55	New
INLD	Vijay Kumar	1,967	1.37	▼0.27
JJP	Yashvir	1,321	0.92	▼39.18
AAP	Rakesh Chandwas	1,221	0.85	New
NOTA	None of the Above	552	0.38	New
Margin of victory		7,585	5.26	▼5.11
Turnout		1,44,077	72.78	▲2.56
Registered electors		2,11,267		▲5.28
BJP gain from JJP		Swing	▲1.07	

=== Assembly Election 2019 ===
2019 Haryana Legislative Assembly election: Badhra
Party	Candidate	Votes	%	±%
JJP	Naina Singh Chautala	52,938	40.09	New
INC	Ranbir Singh Mahendra	39,234	29.72	▲4
BJP	Sukhvinder Sheoran	33,169	25.12	▼4.36
BSP	Shiv Kumar	2,994	2.27	▲1.7
INLD	Vijay Kumar	2,163	1.64	▼21.25
Sarva Hit Party	Vijay Kumar	667	0.51	New
Margin of victory		13,704	10.38	▲6.61
Turnout		1,32,032	70.22	▼7.94
Registered electors		1,88,030		▲10.71
JJP gain from BJP		Swing	▲10.61	

=== Assembly Election 2014 ===
2014 Haryana Legislative Assembly election: Badhra
Party	Candidate	Votes	%	±%
BJP	Sukhvinder Sheoran	39,139	29.48	▲25.13
INC	Ranbir Singh Mahendra	34,133	25.71	▼6.24
INLD	Raghbir Singh	30,388	22.89	▼9.73
Independent	Umed Singh Phogat	24,362	18.35	New
HJC(BL)	Devender Kumar	1,338	1.01	▼22.75
BSP	Inderjeet	757	0.57	▼3.98
Margin of victory		5,006	3.77	▲3.10
Turnout		1,32,744	78.16	▲7.00
Registered electors		1,69,841		▲15.02
BJP gain from INLD		Swing	▼3.14	

=== Assembly Election 2009 ===
2009 Haryana Legislative Assembly election: Badhra
Party	Candidate	Votes	%	±%
INLD	Raghbir Singh	34,280	32.62	▲7.55
INC	Ranbir Singh Mahendra	33,571	31.95	▼9.91
HJC(BL)	Ran Singh	24,963	23.76	New
BSP	Dalbir S/O Neki Ram	4,777	4.55	New
BJP	Narpender Singh	4,575	4.35	▲2.23
Smast Bhartiya Party	Narender	573	0.55	New
Margin of victory		709	0.67	▼16.11
Turnout		1,05,076	71.16	▼5.23
Registered electors		1,47,668		▲9.85
INLD gain from INC		Swing	▼9.23	

=== Assembly Election 2005 ===
2005 Haryana Legislative Assembly election: Badhra
Party	Candidate	Votes	%	±%
INC	Dharambir	42,981	41.86	▲33.01
INLD	Ranbir Singh	25,745	25.07	▼4.47
Independent	Narpender Singh	25,288	24.63	New
Independent	Dalbir	4,070	3.96	New
BJP	Dharampal	2,180	2.12	New
Margin of victory		17,236	16.79	▲8.83
Turnout		1,02,681	76.39	▲3.18
Registered electors		1,34,422		▲15.35
INC gain from INLD		Swing	▲12.31	

=== Assembly Election 2000 ===
2000 Haryana Legislative Assembly election: Badhra
Party	Candidate	Votes	%	±%
INLD	Ranbir Singh	25,205	29.55	New
HVP	Narpender Singh	18,415	21.59	▼31.39
Independent	Ran Singh	16,464	19.30	New
Independent	Ravinder Singh	7,792	9.13	New
INC	Chandrawati	7,547	8.85	▲3.91
Independent	Mahavir Singh	4,951	5.80	New
Independent	Jagat Singh	3,725	4.37	New
BSP	Satyabir Singh	447	0.52	▼1.28
Margin of victory		6,790	7.96	▼26.52
Turnout		85,309	73.71	▲4.82
Registered electors		1,16,539		▲0.18
INLD gain from HVP		Swing	▼23.43	

=== Assembly Election 1996 ===
1996 Haryana Legislative Assembly election: Badhra
Party	Candidate	Votes	%	±%
HVP	Narpender Singh	42,142	52.98	▲5.36
SAP	Ravinder Singh	14,715	18.50	New
Independent	Ran Singh	14,575	18.32	New
INC	Dharampal S/O Laluram	3,929	4.94	▼1.54
BSP	Mirsingh	1,435	1.80	New
Independent	Purshotamdass	1,001	1.26	New
Margin of victory		27,427	34.48	▲8.80
Turnout		79,548	70.00	▲8.70
Registered electors		1,16,328		▲13.03
HVP hold		Swing	▲5.36	

=== Assembly Election 1991 ===
1991 Haryana Legislative Assembly election: Badhra
Party	Candidate	Votes	%	±%
HVP	Attar Singh S/O Lok Ram	29,250	47.62	New
JP	Dalbir	13,480	21.95	New
Independent	Darya Singh	7,181	11.69	New
BJP	Attar Singh S/O Ram Sarup	5,356	8.72	New
INC	Dharam Singh	3,978	6.48	▼35.51
Independent	Vishamehar	879	1.43	New
Independent	Sultan	340	0.55	New
Margin of victory		15,770	25.67	▲17.96
Turnout		61,424	62.39	▼5.77
Registered electors		1,02,915		▲7.04
HVP gain from LKD		Swing	▼2.09	

=== Assembly Election 1987 ===
1987 Haryana Legislative Assembly election: Badhra
Party	Candidate	Votes	%	±%
LKD	Ran Singh S/O Sheokaran	31,279	49.71	▲9
INC	Attar Singh Mandiwala	26,423	41.99	▲3.32
VHP	Chandrawati	2,070	3.29	New
Independent	Ram Kumar	661	1.05	New
Independent	Suraj Bhan S/O Balwant Singh	640	1.02	New
INC(J)	Vijay Singh	412	0.65	New
Independent	Phool Chand	278	0.44	New
Margin of victory		4,856	7.72	▲5.68
Turnout		62,929	67.69	▲0.41
Registered electors		96,147		▲16.22
LKD hold		Swing	▲9.00	

=== Assembly Election 1982 ===
1982 Haryana Legislative Assembly election: Badhra
Party	Candidate	Votes	%	±%
LKD	Chandrawati	21,905	40.71	New
INC	Attar Singh	20,808	38.67	▲30.12
Independent	Piare Lal	3,795	7.05	New
Independent	Bhagwan Singh	2,282	4.24	New
Independent	Manohar Lal	1,719	3.19	New
JP	Dharampal	1,583	2.94	▼37.17
Independent	Satvir	597	1.11	New
Independent	Kanwal Singh	484	0.90	New
Independent	Sanwat Ram	305	0.57	New
Margin of victory		1,097	2.04	▼2.11
Turnout		53,809	66.25	▲1.81
Registered electors		82,725		▲20.45
LKD gain from JP		Swing	▲0.59	

=== Assembly Election 1977 ===
1977 Haryana Legislative Assembly election: Badhra
Party	Candidate	Votes	%	±%
JP	Ran Singh	17,423	40.11	New
Independent	Attar Singh	15,621	35.97	New
Independent	Ravinder Singh	3,734	8.60	New
INC	Daya Kumari	3,715	8.55	▼38.93
Independent	Gobind Lal	1,383	3.18	New
Independent	Dalip Singh	1,219	2.81	New
Independent	Chhotu Ram	270	0.62	New
Margin of victory		1,802	4.15	▼9.66
Turnout		43,433	64.25	▼0.72
Registered electors		68,680		▼3.39
JP gain from INC		Swing	▼7.37	

=== Assembly Election 1972 ===
1972 Haryana Legislative Assembly election: Badhra
Party	Candidate	Votes	%	±%
INC	Lajja Rani	21,591	47.48	▲26.3
INC(O)	Attar Singh	15,313	33.68	New
Independent	Dalip Singh	4,084	8.98	New
Independent	Ram Chand	1,588	3.49	New
BKD	Gunpai Singh	1,486	3.27	New
Independent	Gobind Lal	890	1.96	New
Independent	Gian Parkash	518	1.14	New
Margin of victory		6,278	13.81	▲5.78
Turnout		45,470	66.00	▲8.59
Registered electors		71,093		▲16.46
INC gain from VHP		Swing	▲13.58	

=== Assembly Election 1968 ===
1968 Haryana Legislative Assembly election: Badhra
Party	Candidate	Votes	%	±%
VHP	Amir Singh	11,460	33.90	New
Independent	Attar Singh	8,748	25.88	New
INC	Daya Kumari	7,159	21.18	▼2.66
Independent	Paras Ram	3,135	9.27	New
Independent	Umrao Singh	1,857	5.49	New
Independent	Bhola Ram	782	2.31	New
Independent	Nihal Singh	439	1.30	New
ABJS	Radha Kishan	221	0.65	New
Margin of victory		2,712	8.02	▼5.26
Turnout		33,801	57.23	▼11.88
Registered electors		61,044		▲1.59
VHP gain from Independent		Swing	▼3.22	

=== Assembly Election 1967 ===
1967 Haryana Legislative Assembly election: Badhra
Party	Candidate	Votes	%	±%
Independent	Attar Singh	15,003	37.13	New
INC	Chandrawati	9,635	23.84	New
Independent	Attar Singh	5,068	12.54	New
CPI(M)	D. Singh	4,539	11.23	New
RPI	D. Ram	3,132	7.75	New
Independent	Bhola Ram	2,844	7.04	New
Independent	Harphul	190	0.47	New
Margin of victory		5,368	13.28	
Turnout		40,411	69.94	
Registered electors		60,089		
Independent win (new seat)				

== See also ==
- Bhiwani
- Charkhi Dadri
- Badhra
