= Naina Singh Chautala =

Indian politician (born 1966)

Member of Haryana Legislative Assembly
- In office 2019–2024
- Preceded by: Sukhvinder Sheoran
- Succeeded by: Umed Singh
- Constituency: Badhra
- In office 2014-2019
- Preceded by: Ajay Singh Chautala
- Succeeded by: Amit Sihag Chautala
- Constituency: Dabwali

Personal details
- Born: 8 December 1966 (age 59) Daroli, Hisar, Haryana, India
- Citizenship: Indian
- Party: Jannayak Janata Party
- Other political affiliations: Indian National Lok Dal (till December 2018)
- Spouse: Ajay Singh Chautala
- Children: Dushyant Chautala, Digvijay Chautala
- Profession: Politician

Naina Singh Chautala is an Indian politician from Jannayak Janata Party and a former member of Haryana Legislative Assembly from Badhra. Previously (2014-2019), she was the member of Indian National Lok Dal and represented Dabwali in Haryana Legislative Assembly. She is married to Ajay Singh Chautala and mother of Dushyant Chautala and Digvijay Chautala. She is the third and last daughter of Ch. Bhim Singh Godara and Smt. Kantadevi Godara.

She was one of the four MLAs who joined her son's party Jannayak Janta Party after a split in Indian National Lok Dal.

== See also ==
- Devi Lal
- Dynastic politics of Haryana
- Dushyant Chautala
