= Satish Kumar Phagna =

Indian politician

Member of Haryana Legislative Assembly
- Incumbent
- Assumed office 8 October 2024
- Preceded by: Neeraj Sharma
- Constituency: Faridabad NIT

Personal details
- Party: Bharatiya Janata Party
- Profession: Politician

Satish Kumar Phagna is an Indian politician from Haryana. He is a Member of the Haryana Legislative Assembly elected in the 2024 elections, representing Faridabad NIT Assembly constituency as a member of the Bharatiya Janata Party.

== See also ==
- 2024 Haryana Legislative Assembly election
- Haryana Legislative Assembly
