= Faridabad NIT Assembly constituency =

Constituency of the Haryana legislative assembly in India

Coordinates: 28.389°N 77.301°E

- Constituency No. 86 for the Haryana Legislative Assembly

Constituency details
- Country: India
- Region: North India
- State: Haryana
- District: Faridabad
- Lok Sabha constituency: Faridabad
- Established: 2009
- Total electors: 3,17,514
- Reservation: None

Member of Legislative Assembly
- 15th Haryana Legislative Assembly
- Incumbent Satish Kumar Phagna
- Party: BJP
- Elected year: 2024

Faridabad NIT Assembly constituency is one of the 90 constituencies in the Haryana Legislative Assembly of Haryana a north state of India. Faridabad NIT is also part of Faridabad Lok Sabha constituency.

Satish Phagna is the current MLA from Faridabad NIT.

== Members of the Legislative Assembly ==
Year	Member	Party
Till 2009: Constituency did not exist
2009	Shiv Charan Lal Sharma	Independent
2014	Nagender Bhadana	Indian National Lok Dal
2019	Neeraj Sharma	Indian National Congress
2024	Satish Kumar Phagna	Bharatiya Janata Party

== Election results ==
=== Assembly Election 2024 ===
2024 Haryana Legislative Assembly election: Faridabad NIT
Party	Candidate	Votes	%	±%
BJP	Satish Kumar Phagna	91,992	47.54%	▲10.72
INC	Neeraj Sharma	58,775	30.38%	▼8.49
INLD	Nagender Bhadana	29,549	15.27%	▲14.49
JJP	Haji Karamat Ali	8,774	4.53%	New
AAP	Ravi Dagar	1,415	0.73%	▼1.31
NOTA	None of the Above	1,210	0.63%	▼0.25
Margin of victory		33,217	17.17%	▲15.13
Turnout		1,93,552	60.21	▼1.16
Registered electors		3,17,514		▲24.14
BJP gain from INC		Swing	▲8.68	

=== Assembly Election 2019 ===
2019 Haryana Legislative Assembly election: Faridabad NIT
Party	Candidate	Votes	%	±%
INC	Neeraj Sharma	61,697	38.86%	▲36.83
BJP	Nagender Bhadana	58,455	36.82%	▲11.84
BSP	Hazi Karamat Ali	17,574	11.07%	▲2.56
Independent	Chander Bhatia	6,992	4.40%	New
Independent	Pradeep Rana	3,928	2.47%	New
AAP	Santosh Kumar Yadav	3,240	2.04%	New
NOTA	Nota	1,384	0.87%	New
INLD	Jagjit Pannu	1,240	0.78%	▼31.17
JJP	Tejpal	1,208	0.76%	New
Margin of victory		3,242	2.04%	▲0.01
Turnout		1,58,755	61.36%	▼5.60
Registered electors		2,58,714		▲21.00
INC gain from INLD		Swing	▲6.92	

=== Assembly Election 2014 ===
2014 Haryana Legislative Assembly election: Faridabad NIT
Party	Candidate	Votes	%	±%
INLD	Nagender Bhadana	45,740	31.95%	▲27.16
Independent	Pandit Shiv Charan Lal Sharma	42,826	29.91%	New
BJP	Yashvir Singh	35,760	24.98%	▲16.68
BSP	Liyakat Ali	12,189	8.51%	▼1.12
INC	Gulshan Kumar Bagga	2,904	2.03%	▼16.56
Margin of victory		2,914	2.04%	▼7.36
Turnout		1,43,177	66.96%	▲2.12
Registered electors		2,13,818		▲65.37
INLD gain from Independent		Swing	▲3.96	

=== Assembly Election 2009 ===
2009 Haryana Legislative Assembly election: Faridabad NIT
Party	Candidate	Votes	%	±%
Independent	Pandit Shiv Charan Lal Sharma	23,461	27.98%	New
INC	Akagar Chand Chaudhry	15,586	18.59%	New
Independent	Nagender Bhadana	15,460	18.44%	New
BSP	Shiv Raj Lohia	8,074	9.63%	New
BJP	Mahender Bhadana	6,956	8.30%	New
INLD	Tejpal	4,011	4.78%	New
Independent	Dharambir Bhadhana	3,492	4.17%	New
RJD	Ved Prakash Yadav	2,565	3.06%	New
SP	Liyakat Ali	2,364	2.82%	New
CPI	Bechu Giri	939	1.12%	New
Margin of victory		7,875	9.39%	
Turnout		83,837	64.84%	
Registered electors		1,29,293		
Independent win (new seat)				

== See also ==
- Faridabad
- Faridabad district
- List of constituencies of Haryana Legislative Assembly
