= Dabwali Assembly constituency =

Constituency of the Haryana legislative assembly in India

Coordinates: 29.963°N 74.702°E

- Constituency No. 43 for the Haryana Legislative Assembly

Constituency details
- Country: India
- Region: North India
- State: Haryana
- Lok Sabha constituency: Sirsa
- Total electors: 2,07,272
- Reservation: None

Member of Legislative Assembly
- 15th Haryana Legislative Assembly
- Incumbent Aditya Devilal
- Party: INLD
- Elected year: 2024

Dabwali Assembly constituency is one of the 90 constituencies in the Haryana Legislative Assembly of Haryana, a state in northwest India. Dabwali is also part of Sirsa Lok Sabha constituency.

Aditya Chautala is the current MLA from Dabwali.

== Members of Legislative Assembly ==
| Year | Member | Party |
|---|---|---|
| 1967 | Kesra Ram | Indian National Congress |
| 1968 | Teja Singh | Independent |
| 1972 | Govardhan Dass Chauhan | Indian National Congress |
| 1977 | Mani Ram | Janata Party |
| 1982 | Govardhan Dass Chouhan | Indian National Congress |
| 1987 | Mani Ram | Lok Dal |
| 1991 | Santosh Chauhan Sarwan | Indian National Congress |
| 1996 | Mani Ram | Samata Party |
| 2000 | Sita Ram | Indian National Lok Dal |
| 2005 | Sita Ram | Indian National Lok Dal |
| 2009 | Ajay Singh Chautala | Indian National Lok Dal |
| 2014 | Naina Singh Chautala | Indian National Lok Dal |
| 2019 | Amit Sihag | Indian National Congress |
| 2024 | Aditya Devilal | Indian National Lok Dal |

== Election results ==
=== Assembly Election 2024 ===
2024 Haryana Legislative Assembly election: Dabwali
| Party | Candidate | Votes | % | ±% |
|---|---|---|---|---|
| INLD | Aditya Devilal | 56,074 | 34.42% | ▲28.80 |
| INC | Amit Sihag | 55,464 | 34.04% | ▼8.52 |
| JJP | Digvijay Singh Chautala | 35,261 | 21.64% | ▲7.00 |
| BJP | Baldev Singh Mangiana | 7,139 | 4.38% | ▼28.23 |
| AAP | Kuldeep Singh Gadrana | 6,606 | 4.05% | ▲3.24 |
| NOTA | None of the Above | 856 | 0.53% | ▼0.41 |
| Margin of victory | | 610 | 0.37% | ▼9.58 |
| Turnout | | 1,62,933 | 78.44% | ▼0.41 |
| Registered electors | | 2,07,272 | | ▲4.23 |
| INLD gain from INC | | Swing | ▼8.15 | |

=== Assembly Election 2019 ===
2019 Haryana Legislative Assembly election: Dabwali
| Party | Candidate | Votes | % | ±% |
|---|---|---|---|---|
| INC | Amit Sihag | 66,885 | 42.57 | ▲4.44 |
| BJP | Aditya Devilal | 51,238 | 32.61 | ▲18.34 |
| JJP | Saravjit Singh Masitan | 23,002 | 14.64 | New |
| INLD | Dr. Sita Ram | 8,825 | 5.62 | ▼37.98 |
| NOTA | Nota | 1,477 | 0.94 | ▼0.05 |
| BSP | Subhash Chander | 1,290 | 0.82 | ▲0.11 |
| AAP | Malkeet Singh | 1,276 | 0.81 | New |
| LSP | Sant Lal | 1,038 | 0.66 | New |
| Margin of victory | | 15,647 | 9.96 | ▲4.48 |
| Turnout | | 1,57,136 | 78.85 | ▼7.40 |
| Registered electors | | 1,99,291 | | ▲10.15 |
| INC gain from INLD | | Swing | ▼1.03 | |

=== Assembly Election 2014 ===
2014 Haryana Legislative Assembly election: Dabwali
| Party | Candidate | Votes | % | ±% |
|---|---|---|---|---|
| INLD | Naina Singh Chautala | 68,029 | 43.60 | ▼3.94 |
| INC | Dr. Kamalvir Singh | 59,484 | 38.12 | ▼0.54 |
| BJP | Dev Kumar Sharma | 22,261 | 14.27 | ▲13.49 |
| NOTA | None of the Above | 1,549 | 0.99 | New |
| BSP | Lilu Ram Assa Khera | 1,115 | 0.71 | ▼1.66 |
| HJC(BL) | Nirmal Bishnoi | 1,012 | 0.65 | ▼0.76 |
| HLP | Jagvinder Singh | 904 | 0.58 | New |
| Margin of victory | | 8,545 | 5.48 | ▼3.40 |
| Turnout | | 1,56,042 | 86.25 | ▼1.09 |
| Registered electors | | 1,80,921 | | ▲15.79 |
| INLD hold | | Swing | ▼3.94 | |

=== Assembly Election 2009 ===
2009 Haryana Legislative Assembly election: Dabwali
| Party | Candidate | Votes | % | ±% |
|---|---|---|---|---|
| INLD | Ajay Singh Chautala | 64,868 | 47.54 | ▼1.95 |
| INC | Dr. Kamalvir Singh | 52,760 | 38.66 | ▼3.02 |
| Independent | Ravinder Singh Chautala | 8,344 | 6.11 | New |
| BSP | Preet Mahender Singh | 3,240 | 2.37 | ▼0.28 |
| Independent | Jagdev Singh | 2,679 | 1.96 | New |
| HJC(BL) | Kuldeep Singh | 1,916 | 1.40 | New |
| BJP | Renu | 1,056 | 0.77 | ▼2.54 |
| Smast Bhartiya Party | Rajbir Singh | 774 | 0.57 | New |
| Margin of victory | | 12,108 | 8.87 | ▲1.06 |
| Turnout | | 1,36,459 | 87.34 | ▲9.73 |
| Registered electors | | 1,56,245 | | ▲18.05 |
| INLD hold | | Swing | ▼1.95 | |

=== Assembly Election 2005 ===
2005 Haryana Legislative Assembly election: Dabwali
| Party | Candidate | Votes | % | ±% |
|---|---|---|---|---|
| INLD | Dr. Sita Ram | 50,840 | 49.49 | ▼12.56 |
| INC | Jagan Nath | 42,815 | 41.68 | ▲12.05 |
| BJP | Jagtar Singh | 3,405 | 3.31 | New |
| BSP | Majer Singh | 2,729 | 2.66 | ▼3.53 |
| CPI | Ganpat Ram | 1,253 | 1.22 | New |
| Independent | Darshana Devi | 950 | 0.92 | New |
| LKD | Rajender Kaur | 733 | 0.71 | New |
| Margin of victory | | 8,025 | 7.81 | ▼24.60 |
| Turnout | | 1,02,725 | 77.61 | ▲7.56 |
| Registered electors | | 1,32,360 | | ▲11.33 |
| INLD hold | | Swing | ▼12.56 | |

=== Assembly Election 2000 ===
2000 Haryana Legislative Assembly election: Dabwali
| Party | Candidate | Votes | % | ±% |
|---|---|---|---|---|
| INLD | Dr. Sita Ram | 51,672 | 62.05 | New |
| INC | Labh Singh | 24,679 | 29.63 | ▲7.28 |
| BSP | Major Singh | 5,153 | 6.19 | ▼2.8 |
| HVP | Het Ram | 667 | 0.80 | ▼24.38 |
| Independent | Babu Lal | 586 | 0.70 | New |
| Independent | Parkash Singh | 473 | 0.57 | New |
| Margin of victory | | 26,993 | 32.41 | ▲21.78 |
| Turnout | | 83,279 | 70.55 | ▼2.98 |
| Registered electors | | 1,18,887 | | ▲5.62 |
| INLD gain from SAP | | Swing | ▲26.24 | |

=== Assembly Election 1996 ===
1996 Haryana Legislative Assembly election: Dabwali
| Party | Candidate | Votes | % | ±% |
|---|---|---|---|---|
| SAP | Mani Ram | 29,434 | 35.81 | New |
| HVP | Jagsir Singh | 20,697 | 25.18 | ▲23.59 |
| INC | Labh Singh | 18,379 | 22.36 | ▼21.8 |
| BSP | Lilu Ram Assa Khera | 7,386 | 8.98 | ▲0.84 |
| AIIC(T) | Piara Singh | 1,115 | 1.36 | New |
| Independent | Harvansh Kaur | 672 | 0.82 | New |
| Independent | Joginder Singh S/O Shoba Singh | 649 | 0.79 | New |
| Independent | Angrej Singh | 635 | 0.77 | New |
| Independent | Sukhdev | 533 | 0.65 | New |
| Independent | Piare Lal | 466 | 0.57 | New |
| Independent | Kalu Ram | 435 | 0.53 | New |
| Margin of victory | | 8,737 | 10.63 | ▼6.68 |
| Turnout | | 82,205 | 75.98 | ▲9.06 |
| Registered electors | | 1,12,560 | | ▼1.56 |
| SAP gain from INC | | Swing | ▼8.35 | |

=== Assembly Election 1991 ===
1991 Haryana Legislative Assembly election: Dabwali
| Party | Candidate | Votes | % | ±% |
|---|---|---|---|---|
| INC | Santosh Chauhan Sarwan | 32,296 | 44.15 | ▲18.44 |
| JP | Gain Chand | 19,637 | 26.85 | New |
| BSP | Suraj Bhan | 5,957 | 8.14 | New |
| BJP | Bhai Devi Lal | 5,481 | 7.49 | New |
| Independent | Surjit Singh | 3,369 | 4.61 | New |
| Independent | Kalu Ram | 3,126 | 4.27 | New |
| HVP | Rajinder Kumar Chauhan | 1,163 | 1.59 | New |
| Independent | Bimla Devi | 526 | 0.72 | New |
| Margin of victory | | 12,659 | 17.31 | ▼21.70 |
| Turnout | | 73,143 | 65.48 | ▼8.95 |
| Registered electors | | 1,14,343 | | ▲13.24 |
| INC gain from LKD | | Swing | ▼20.56 | |

=== Assembly Election 1987 ===
1987 Haryana Legislative Assembly election: Dabwali
| Party | Candidate | Votes | % | ±% |
|---|---|---|---|---|
| LKD | Mani Ram | 47,652 | 64.72 | ▲17.98 |
| INC | Govardhan Dass Chauhan | 18,930 | 25.71 | ▼21.98 |
| Independent | Mukha | 2,733 | 3.71 | New |
| Independent | Suraj Bhan | 2,299 | 3.12 | New |
| Independent | Kewal Krishan | 363 | 0.49 | New |
| Margin of victory | | 28,722 | 39.01 | ▲38.06 |
| Turnout | | 73,630 | 73.89 | ▲3.01 |
| Registered electors | | 1,00,972 | | ▲23.59 |
| LKD gain from INC | | Swing | ▲17.03 | |

=== Assembly Election 1982 ===
1982 Haryana Legislative Assembly election: Dabwali
| Party | Candidate | Votes | % | ±% |
|---|---|---|---|---|
| INC | Govardhan Dass Chauhan | 27,234 | 47.69 | ▲15.96 |
| LKD | Mani Ram | 26,694 | 46.74 | New |
| Independent | Sahib Ram | 1,053 | 1.84 | New |
| Independent | Gurnam Singh | 686 | 1.20 | New |
| Independent | Jasa Ram | 479 | 0.84 | New |
| Independent | Nopa Ram | 352 | 0.62 | New |
| Independent | Rameshwar Dass | 298 | 0.52 | New |
| Margin of victory | | 540 | 0.95 | ▼18.50 |
| Turnout | | 57,112 | 71.30 | ▲11.50 |
| Registered electors | | 81,696 | | ▲16.18 |
| INC gain from JP | | Swing | ▼3.48 | |

=== Assembly Election 1977 ===
1977 Haryana Legislative Assembly election: Dabwali
| Party | Candidate | Votes | % | ±% |
|---|---|---|---|---|
| JP | Mani Ram | 21,017 | 51.17 | New |
| INC | Govardhan Dass Chauhan | 13,032 | 31.73 | ▼47.85 |
| Independent | Gurdial Singh | 3,981 | 9.69 | New |
| Independent | Ajit Kumar Rangila | 2,576 | 6.27 | New |
| Independent | Mool Chand Joyia | 467 | 1.14 | New |
| Margin of victory | | 7,985 | 19.44 | ▼50.71 |
| Turnout | | 41,073 | 59.05 | ▲4.40 |
| Registered electors | | 70,317 | | ▲11.59 |
| JP gain from INC | | Swing | ▼28.41 | |

=== Assembly Election 1972 ===
1972 Haryana Legislative Assembly election: Dabwali
| Party | Candidate | Votes | % | ±% |
|---|---|---|---|---|
| INC | Govardhan Dass Chauhan | 27,086 | 79.58 | ▲46.42 |
| Independent | Gurdial Singh | 3,209 | 9.43 | |
| Independent | Nopa Ram | 2,714 | 7.97 | |
| Independent | Sarswati Devi | 1,026 | 3.01 | |
| Margin of victory | | 23,877 | 70.15 | ▲65.57 |
| Turnout | | 34,035 | 55.17 | ▼2.47 |
| Registered electors | | 63,016 | | ▲12.65 |
| INC gain from Independent | | Swing | ▲41.84 | |

=== Assembly Election 1968 ===
1968 Haryana Legislative Assembly election: Dabwali
| Party | Candidate | Votes | % | ±% |
|---|---|---|---|---|
| Independent | Teja Singh | 11,925 | 37.74 | |
| INC | Kesra Ram | 10,477 | 33.16 | ▼13.25 |
| Independent | Basti | 8,337 | 26.39 | |
| Independent | Prem Chander | 856 | 2.71 | |
| Margin of victory | | 1,448 | 4.58 | ▲1.93 |
| Turnout | | 31,595 | 57.88 | ▼4.34 |
| Registered electors | | 55,941 | | ▲3.73 |
| Independent gain from INC | | Swing | ▼8.66 | |

=== Assembly Election 1967 ===
1967 Haryana Legislative Assembly election: Dabwali
| Party | Candidate | Votes | % | ±% |
|---|---|---|---|---|
| INC | Kesra Ram | 15,221 | 46.41 | |
| Independent | P. Chander | 14,351 | 43.75 | |
| PSP | M. Ram | 1,502 | 4.58 | |
| Independent | D. Singh | 1,243 | 3.79 | |
| Independent | Began | 483 | 1.47 | |
| Margin of victory | | 870 | 2.65 | |
| Turnout | | 32,800 | 64.80 | |
| Registered electors | | 53,928 | | |
| INC win (new seat) | | | | |

== See also ==
- Dabwali
- Sirsa district
- List of constituencies of Haryana Legislative Assembly
