= Pataudi Assembly constituency =

Constituency of the Haryana legislative assembly in India

Coordinates: 28.32°N 76.78°E

Pataudi
- Constituency No. 75 for the Haryana Legislative Assembly

Constituency details
- Country: India
- Region: North India
- State: Haryana
- District: Gurgaon
- Lok Sabha constituency: Gurgaon
- Total electors: 2,56,786
- Reservation: SC

Member of Legislative Assembly
- 15th Haryana Legislative Assembly
- Incumbent Bimla Chaudhary
- Party: Bharatiya Janata Party
- Elected year: 2024

Pataudi is one of the 90 assembly constituencies of Haryana, which is a northern state of India. It is also part of Gurgaon Lok Sabha constituency. It is reserved for members of the Scheduled Castes.

== Members of the Legislative Assembly ==
Year	Member	Party
1967	Rao Birender Singh ex CM of Haryana	Indian National Congress
1968	Vivek Sharma	Vishal Haryana Party
1972	Sisram Thakran	Indian National Congress
1977	Narayan Singh	Vishal Haryana Party
1982	Mohan Lal Pippal	Indian National Congress
1987	Shiv Lal	Lokdal
1991	Mohan Lal Pippal	Janata Party
1996	Narayan Singh	Haryana Vikas Party
2000	Ram Bir Singh	Indian National Lok Dal
2005	Bhupinder Chaudhary	Indian National Congress
2009	Ganga Ram	Indian National Lok Dal
2014	Bimla Chaudhary	Bharatiya Janata Party
2019	Satya Prakash Jaravata	Bharatiya Janata Party
2024	Bimla Chaudhary	Bharatiya Janata Party

== Election results ==
=== Assembly Election 2024 ===
2024 Haryana Legislative Assembly election: Pataudi
Party	Candidate	Votes	%	±%
BJP	Bimla Chaudhary	98,519	62.40%	▲18.20
INC	Pearl Choudhary	51,989	32.93%	▲19.08
INLD	Pawan Kumar Bhora	3,214	2.04%	New
AAP	Pardeep Jatauli	1,874	1.19%	New
JJP	Amarnath J. E.	963	0.61%	▼13.70
NOTA	None of the Above	668	0.42%	▼0.11
Margin of victory		46,530	29.47%	▲2.81
Turnout		1,57,893	61.97%	▲0.30
Registered electors		2,56,786		▲14.53
BJP hold		Swing	▲18.20	

=== Assembly Election 2019 ===
2019 Haryana Legislative Assembly election: Pataudi
Party	Candidate	Votes	%	±%
BJP	Satya Prakash Jaravata	60,633	44.20	▼11.95
Independent	Narender Singh Pahari	24,054	17.53	New
JJP	Deepchand Chairman	19,629	14.31	New
INC	Sudhir Kumar	18,994	13.84	▲2.16
Independent	Pardeep Jatauli	5,062	3.69	New
BSP	Sunil	2,140	1.56	▲0.21
NOTA	Nota	732	0.53	New
Margin of victory		36,579	26.66	▼2.43
Turnout		1,37,194	61.67	▼6.77
Registered electors		2,22,465		▲13.67
BJP hold		Swing	▼11.95	

=== Assembly Election 2014 ===
2014 Haryana Legislative Assembly election: Pataudi
Party	Candidate	Votes	%	±%
BJP	Bimla Chaudhary	75,198	56.14	▲51.95
INLD	Ganga Ram	36,235	27.05	▼24.40
INC	Sudhir Kumar	15,652	11.69	▼13.95
BSP	Ajeet Singh	1,813	1.35	▼1.73
Independent	Sudesh Kumar	1,791	1.34	New
HJC(BL)	Rajesh Kumar	1,430	1.07	▼0.21
Margin of victory		38,963	29.09	▲3.27
Turnout		1,33,939	68.44	▲8.17
Registered electors		1,95,707		▲23.04
BJP gain from INLD		Swing	▲4.69	

=== Assembly Election 2009 ===
2009 Haryana Legislative Assembly election: Pataudi
Party	Candidate	Votes	%	±%
INLD	Ganga Ram	49,323	51.45	▲14.86
INC	Bhupinder Chaudhary	24,576	25.64	▼20.37
Independent	Rambir Singh	5,790	6.04	New
BJP	Resham Singh	4,020	4.19	▼6.41
Independent	Satya Prakash Jaravata	3,996	4.17	New
BSP	Net Ram	2,952	3.08	▲1.74
Margin of victory		24,747	25.82	▲16.40
Turnout		95,862	60.27	▼1.19
Registered electors		1,59,063		▲8.07
INLD gain from INC		Swing	▲5.45	

=== Assembly Election 2005 ===
2005 Haryana Legislative Assembly election: Pataudi
Party	Candidate	Votes	%	±%
INC	Bhupinder Chaudhary	41,612	46.00	▲4.32
INLD	Ganga Ram	33,096	36.59	▼16.32
BJP	Tulsi	9,587	10.60	New
SP	Ram Kishan	2,858	3.16	▲1.90
BSP	Net Ram	1,212	1.34	▲0.37
Independent	Dharam Chand	832	0.92	New
Independent	Seema Kumari	741	0.82	New
Margin of victory		8,516	9.41	▼1.81
Turnout		90,452	61.45	▼3.38
Registered electors		1,47,187		▲19.85
INC gain from INLD		Swing	▼6.90	

=== Assembly Election 2000 ===
2000 Haryana Legislative Assembly election: Pataudi
Party	Candidate	Votes	%	±%
INLD	Ram Bir Singh	42,127	52.91	New
INC	Kirpa Ram Punia	33,188	41.68	▲25.82
HVP	Narayan Singh	1,352	1.70	▼41.48
SP	Suman Lata	1,004	1.26	▼3.25
Margin of victory		8,939	11.23	▼9.70
Turnout		79,625	66.02	▲4.80
Registered electors		1,22,805		▲0.01
INLD gain from HVP		Swing	▲9.73	

=== Assembly Election 1996 ===
1996 Haryana Legislative Assembly election: Pataudi
Party	Candidate	Votes	%	±%
HVP	Narayan Singh	31,834	43.18	▲15.49
SAP	Ram Veer Singh	16,409	22.26	New
INC	Mohan Lal	11,694	15.86	▼4.56
BSP	Narayan Singh S/O Girdhari Lal	3,708	5.03	New
SP	Hardwari Lal	3,322	4.51	New
AIIC(T)	Bhupender Singh	2,219	3.01	New
Independent	Om Parkash	1,482	2.01	New
Margin of victory		15,425	20.92	▲13.49
Turnout		73,722	62.83	▲4.74
Registered electors		1,22,796		▲10.58
HVP gain from JP		Swing	▲8.06	

=== Assembly Election 1991 ===
1991 Haryana Legislative Assembly election: Pataudi
Party	Candidate	Votes	%	±%
JP	Mohan Lal	21,566	35.12%	▲34.35
HVP	Narayan Singh S/O Bichha Ram	17,004	27.69%	New
INC	Shiv Lal	12,542	20.43%	▼12.89
Independent	Narayan Singh S/O Girdhari Lal	3,019	4.92%	New
BJP	Man Singh	2,513	4.09%	New
Independent	Babu Ram	1,631	2.66%	New
LKD	Hardwari Lal	1,337	2.18%	▼57.56
Independent	Om Pal	633	1.03%	New
Margin of victory		4,562	7.43%	▼18.98
Turnout		61,399	57.73%	▼9.50
Registered electors		1,11,045		▲11.92
JP gain from LKD		Swing	▼24.61	

=== Assembly Election 1987 ===
1987 Haryana Legislative Assembly election: Pataudi
Party	Candidate	Votes	%	±%
LKD	Shiv Lal	38,400	59.73%	▲48.09
INC	Narayan Singh	21,421	33.32%	▼9.38
Independent	Hera Lal	1,922	2.99%	New
Independent	Amar Singh S/O Rich Pal	787	1.22%	New
JP	Mool Chand	499	0.78%	New
INC(J)	Sagd Singh	457	0.71%	New
Margin of victory		16,979	26.41%	▲24.92
Turnout		64,285	65.78%	▲1.14
Registered electors		99,218		▲18.60
LKD gain from INC		Swing	▲17.03	

=== Assembly Election 1982 ===
1982 Haryana Legislative Assembly election: Pataudi
Party	Candidate	Votes	%	±%
INC	Mohan Lal	22,739	42.70%	▲38.75
Independent	Narayan Singh	21,942	41.21%	New
LKD	Gore Lal	6,200	11.64%	New
Independent	Ram Singh	1,243	2.33%	New
Margin of victory		797	1.50%	▼0.31
Turnout		53,247	64.83%	▲7.98
Registered electors		83,655		▲19.50
INC gain from VHP		Swing	▼1.51	

=== Assembly Election 1977 ===
1977 Haryana Legislative Assembly election: Pataudi
Party	Candidate	Votes	%	±%
VHP	Narayan Singh	17,232	44.21%	▲5.42
JP	Ram Singh	16,528	42.41%	New
Independent	Thakar Das	2,007	5.15%	New
INC	Amar Nath	1,541	3.95%	▼51.95
Independent	Pirthi Ram	636	1.63%	New
Independent	Shiv Lal	581	1.49%	New
Independent	Keso Ram	450	1.15%	New
Margin of victory		704	1.81%	▼15.31
Turnout		38,975	56.40%	▼20.30
Registered electors		70,005		▲1.58
VHP gain from INC		Swing	▼11.69	

=== Assembly Election 1972 ===
1972 Haryana Legislative Assembly election: Pataudi
Party	Candidate	Votes	%	±%
INC	Sisram	29,273	55.91%	▲39.00
VHP	Ramjiwan Singh	20,313	38.79%	▼8.44
Independent	Mangtu Ram	2,331	4.45%	New
Independent	Balwant Singh	445	0.85%	New
Margin of victory		8,960	17.11%	▲4.02
Turnout		52,362	77.74%	▲7.83
Registered electors		68,916		▲9.24
INC gain from VHP		Swing	▲8.67	

=== Assembly Election 1968 ===
1968 Haryana Legislative Assembly election: Pataudi
Party	Candidate	Votes	%	±%
VHP	Ramjiwan Singh	20,306	47.23%	New
SWA	Sees Ram	14,678	34.14%	New
INC	Jagmal Singh	7,269	16.91%	▼33.34
Independent	Nepal Singh	379	0.88%	New
Independent	Randhir Singh	358	0.83%	New
Margin of victory		5,628	13.09%	▲10.89
Turnout		42,990	69.53%	▼8.31
Registered electors		63,084		▲7.63
VHP gain from INC		Swing	▼3.01	

=== Assembly Election 1967 ===
1967 Haryana Legislative Assembly election: Pataudi
Party	Candidate	Votes	%	±%
INC	B. Singh	22,517	50.25%	New
Independent	S. Ram	21,531	48.05%	New
RPI	P. Mal	764	1.70%	New
Margin of victory		986	2.20%	
Turnout		44,812	79.53%	
Registered electors		58,613		
INC win (new seat)				

== See also ==
- Pataudi
- List of constituencies of the Haryana Legislative Assembly
