= Indian National Students Organisation =

Students Organization in India

Indian National Students Organization
- Abbreviation: INSO
- Formation: August 5, 2003; 22 years ago
- Founder: Ajay Singh Chautala
- Founded at: JIND (Haryana)
- Official language: Haryanvi, Hindi
- Leader: Dushyant Chautala
- State President: Deepak Malik (EX MLA Candidate Baroda )
- Affiliations: Jannayak Janta Party (JJP)

Indian National Students Organization (INSO) is the leading and the fastest growing Students Organization in the North India, especially in the states of Haryana, Chandigarh, Delhi, Rajasthan and Punjab. It is an affiliate of Jannayak Janta Party, and founded by Ajay Singh Chautala.

INSo set a Guinness World Record on 1 December 2013 for maximum number of Eye Donation Pledge made by 10450 individuals at "student conference" organised at Rohtak in Haryana.

== See also ==
- Akhil Bharatiya Vidyarthi Parishad (ABVP) an affiliate of BJP
