= Anoop Dhanak =

Indian politician

Haryana Legislative Assembly
- In office 19 October 2014 – 8 October 2024
- Preceded by: Naresh Selwal
- Succeeded by: Naresh Selwal
- Constituency: Uklana

Personal details
- Party: Bhartiya Janata Party
- Other political affiliations: Jananayak Janata Party (2019-2024) Indian National Lok Dal (until 2019)

Anoop Dhanak is an Indian politician. He was elected to the Haryana Legislative Assembly from Uklana in the 2014 and 2019 elections as a member of the Indian National Lok Dal.

He was one of the four MLAs who joined the Dushyant Chautala's Jannayak Janta Party after a split in Indian National Lok Dal. He was named as minister of Independent Charge for Archaeology and Museums and Labour and Employment in Second Manohar Lal Khattar ministry from 2019. He joined the BJP in 2024 but lost from his seat.
