= Shahbad Assembly constituency =

Legislative Assembly constituency in Haryana State, India

Coordinates: 30.16°N 76.87°E

- Constituency No. 12 for the Haryana Legislative Assembly

Constituency details
- Country: India
- Region: North India
- State: Haryana
- District: Kurukshetra
- Lok Sabha constituency: Kurukshetra
- Total electors: 1,71,638
- Reservation: SC

Member of Legislative Assembly
- 15th Haryana Legislative Assembly
- Incumbent Ram Karan
- Party: Indian National Congress
- Elected year: 2024

Shahbad is one of the 90 Legislative Assembly constituencies of Haryana state in India.

It is part of Kurukshetra district and is reserved for candidates belonging to the Scheduled Castes. The current MLA is Ram Karan.

== Members of the Legislative Assembly ==
Year	Member	Party
1967	Jagdish Chander	Indian National Congress
1968	Jagdish Chander	Indian National Congress
1972	Amir Chand	Indian National Congress
1977	Surinder Singh	Janata Party
1982	Tara Singh	Indian National Congress
1987	Harnam Singh	Communist Party of India
1991	Kharaiti Lal	Bharatiya Janata Party
1996	Kapoor Chand	Bharatiya Janata Party
2000	Kapoor Chand	Bharatiya Janata Party
2005	Kharaiti Lal	Indian National Congress
2009	Anil Dhantori	Indian National Congress
2014	Krishan Kumar Bedi	Bharatiya Janata Party
2019	Ram Karan	Jannayak Janta Party
2024	Ram Karan	Indian National Congress

== Election results ==
=== Assembly Election 2024 ===
2024 Haryana Legislative Assembly election: Shahbad
Party	Candidate	Votes	%	±%
INC	Ram Karan	61,050	50.37%	▲35.30
BJP	Subhash Chand	54,609	45.05%	▲19.39
BSP	Chander Bhan Chauhan	1,638	1.35%	▲0.23
Mission Ekta Party	Kanta Aalldia	1,333	1.10%	New
AAP	Asha Rani	932	0.77%	New
NOTA	None of the Above	438	0.36%	▼0.32
Margin of victory		6,441	5.31%	▼24.37
Turnout		1,21,209	70.66%	▼6.51
Registered electors		1,71,638		▲5.83
INC gain from JJP		Swing	▼4.98	

=== Assembly Election 2019 ===
2019 Haryana Legislative Assembly election: Shahbad
Party	Candidate	Votes	%	±%
JJP	Ram Karan	69,233	55.35%	
BJP	Krishan Kumar	32,106	25.67%	−11.51%
INC	Anil Kumar Dhantori	18,844	15.07%	−8.10%
INLD	Sandeep Kumar	1,596	1.28%	−35.45%
BSP	Shakuntla Bhatti	1,398	1.12%	0.06%
LSP	Kulbir Singh	1,050	0.84%	
NOTA	Nota	857	0.69%	0.10%
Margin of victory		37,127	29.68%	29.22%
Turnout		1,25,084	77.17%	−5.86%
Registered electors		1,62,082		9.46%
JJP gain from BJP		Swing	18.17%	

=== Assembly Election 2014 ===
2014 Haryana Legislative Assembly election: Shahbad
Party	Candidate	Votes	%	±%
BJP	Krishan Kumar	45,715	37.18%	25.77%
INLD	Ram Karan	45,153	36.72%	7.52%
INC	Anil Kumar Dhantori	28,482	23.17%	−10.07%
BSP	Dr. Baldev Singh	1,303	1.06%	−5.82%
HJC(BL)	Memo Devi Ranga	862	0.70%	−0.39%
NOTA	None of the Above	717	0.58%	
Margin of victory		562	0.46%	−3.57%
Turnout		1,22,952	83.04%	8.73%
Registered electors		1,48,068		18.57%
BJP gain from INC		Swing	3.94%	

=== Assembly Election 2009 ===
2009 Haryana Legislative Assembly election: Shahbad
Party	Candidate	Votes	%	±%
INC	Anil Kumar Dhantori	30,843	33.24%	−6.33%
INLD	Jitender Kumar	27,102	29.21%	−8.29%
Independent	Ram Karan	14,352	15.47%	
BJP	Krishan Kumar	10,593	11.42%	3.52%
BSP	Dr. Baldev Singh	6,387	6.88%	0.90%
HJC(BL)	Suraj Bhan	1,012	1.09%	
CPI	Sarup Chand	934	1.01%	−1.44%
Independent	Karam Singh	867	0.93%	
Margin of victory		3,741	4.03%	1.95%
Turnout		92,796	74.31%	−2.05%
Registered electors		1,24,883		3.73%
INC hold		Swing	-6.33%	

=== Assembly Election 2005 ===
2005 Haryana Legislative Assembly election: Shahbad
Party	Candidate	Votes	%	±%
INC	Kharaiti Lal	36,377	39.57%	7.10%
INLD	Onkar Singh	34,465	37.49%	
BJP	Atam Parkash	7,261	7.90%	−29.87%
BSP	Ramesh Kumar	5,501	5.98%	−1.18%
BRP	Bhupinder Singh	4,698	5.11%	
CPI	Harnam Singh	2,252	2.45%	−1.59%
Independent	Sukhbir Singh Virk	805	0.88%	
Independent	Balbiro	544	0.59%	
Margin of victory		1,912	2.08%	−3.21%
Turnout		91,927	76.36%	6.58%
Registered electors		1,20,387		10.45%
INC gain from BJP		Swing	1.80%	

=== Assembly Election 2000 ===
2000 Haryana Legislative Assembly election: Shahbad
Party	Candidate	Votes	%	±%
BJP	Kapoor Chand	28,490	37.77%	5.47%
INC	Tara Singh	24,496	32.47%	15.11%
HVP	Sher Singh	11,670	15.47%	
BSP	Dalwinder Singh	5,406	7.17%	−2.48%
CPI	Joginder Singh	3,050	4.04%	0.08%
SJP(R)	Jagir Singh	2,322	3.08%	
Margin of victory		3,994	5.29%	−3.74%
Turnout		75,434	69.78%	−7.43%
Registered electors		1,08,997		−4.56%
BJP hold		Swing	11.67%	

=== Assembly Election 1996 ===
1996 Haryana Legislative Assembly election: Shahbad
Party	Candidate	Votes	%	±%
BJP	Kapoor Chand	27,307	32.29%	6.20%
SAP	Mohinder Singh	19,664	23.26%	
INC	Kharaiti Lal	14,678	17.36%	−5.02%
BSP	Raghubir Singh	8,158	9.65%	4.58%
AIIC(T)	Ram Singh	4,125	4.88%	
Independent	Jasbir Singh Bhinder	3,718	4.40%	
CPI	Harnam Singh	3,347	3.96%	−6.85%
Independent	Ram Chander Premi	1,050	1.24%	
Independent	Pawan Sharma	739	0.87%	
Margin of victory		7,643	9.04%	8.12%
Turnout		84,557	77.21%	3.64%
Registered electors		1,14,208		16.58%
BJP hold		Swing	6.20%	

=== Assembly Election 1991 ===
1991 Haryana Legislative Assembly election: Shahbad
Party	Candidate	Votes	%	±%
BJP	Kharaiti Lal	18,165	26.09%	15.52%
JP	Onkar Singh	17,524	25.17%	23.79%
INC	Jagdeep Singh	15,576	22.37%	9.52%
CPI	Harnam Singh	7,522	10.81%	−25.85%
Independent	Sohan Singh S/O Hukam Singh	4,768	6.85%	
BSP	Raghbir	3,529	5.07%	
Independent	Sohan Singh S/O Kartar Singh	1,712	2.46%	
Margin of victory		641	0.92%	−17.08%
Turnout		69,614	73.57%	−0.94%
Registered electors		97,966		10.58%
BJP gain from CPI		Swing	-10.56%	

=== Assembly Election 1987 ===
1987 Haryana Legislative Assembly election: Shahbad
Party	Candidate	Votes	%	±%
CPI	Harnam Singh	23,831	36.66%	25.88%
Independent	Khariti Lal	12,130	18.66%	
INC	Amir Chand	8,359	12.86%	−23.23%
BJP	Raghbir Chand	6,874	10.57%	−25.09%
Independent	Malik Singh	4,275	6.58%	
Independent	Amar Singh	2,923	4.50%	
Independent	Vir Singh	2,627	4.04%	
JP	Mihan Singh	899	1.38%	−6.69%
Independent	Jagjit Singh	546	0.84%	
Independent	Bijinder Singh	517	0.80%	
Independent	Ser Singh	332	0.51%	
Margin of victory		11,701	18.00%	17.57%
Turnout		65,008	74.51%	−2.37%
Registered electors		88,593		23.86%
CPI gain from INC		Swing	0.57%	

=== Assembly Election 1982 ===
1982 Haryana Legislative Assembly election: Shahbad
Party	Candidate	Votes	%	±%
INC	Tara Singh	19,507	36.09%	18.03%
BJP	Raghubir Chand	19,276	35.66%	
CPI	Harnam Singh	5,827	10.78%	3.45%
JP	Chhavi Parkash	4,364	8.07%	−43.04%
Independent	Vir Singh	3,904	7.22%	
Independent	Kurdia	344	0.64%	
Margin of victory		231	0.43%	−32.63%
Turnout		54,051	76.88%	9.81%
Registered electors		71,527		19.46%
INC gain from JP		Swing	-15.03%	

=== Assembly Election 1977 ===
1977 Haryana Legislative Assembly election: Shahbad
Party	Candidate	Votes	%	±%
JP	Surinder Singh	20,327	51.12%	
INC	Amir Chand	7,182	18.06%	−20.36%
Independent	Gurdev Ram	5,529	13.90%	
Independent	Shansher Kaur	2,983	7.50%	
CPI	Harnam Singh	2,914	7.33%	−29.76%
Independent	Jagjit Singh	702	1.77%	
Margin of victory		13,145	33.06%	31.72%
Turnout		39,766	67.07%	−9.41%
Registered electors		59,877		16.75%
JP gain from INC		Swing	12.70%	

=== Assembly Election 1972 ===
1972 Haryana Legislative Assembly election: Shahbad
Party	Candidate	Votes	%	±%
INC	Amir Chand	14,735	38.42%	−0.08%
CPI	Harnam Singh	14,224	37.09%	
ABJS	Santokh Singh	8,263	21.55%	−7.60%
Independent	Daleep Singh	655	1.71%	
INC(O)	Jagjit Singh	474	1.24%	
Margin of victory		511	1.33%	−4.82%
Turnout		38,351	76.48%	17.60%
Registered electors		51,287		10.88%
INC hold		Swing	-0.08%	

=== Assembly Election 1968 ===
1968 Haryana Legislative Assembly election: Shahbad
Party	Candidate	Votes	%	±%
INC	Jagdish Chander	10,215	38.50%	3.75%
VHP	Jagjit Singh	8,583	32.35%	
ABJS	Jai Dayal	7,733	29.15%	−4.68%
Margin of victory		1,632	6.15%	5.22%
Turnout		26,531	58.88%	−17.33%
Registered electors		46,256		3.28%
INC hold		Swing	3.75%	

=== Assembly Election 1967 ===
1967 Haryana Legislative Assembly election: Shahbad
Party	Candidate	Votes	%	±%
INC	Jagdish Chander	11,074	34.75%	
ABJS	K. Chand	10,778	33.83%	
Independent	S. Singh	8,664	27.19%	
Independent	K. Ram	896	2.81%	
Independent	S. Lal	452	1.42%	
Margin of victory		296	0.93%	
Turnout		31,864	76.21%	
Registered electors		44,788		
INC win (new seat)				

== See also ==
- List of constituencies of the Haryana Legislative Assembly
- Kurukshetra district
