= Ram Karan =

Indian politician

Member of the Haryana Legislative Assembly
- Incumbent
- Assumed office 2019
- Preceded by: Krishan Kumar
- Constituency: Shahbad

Personal details
- Party: Indian National Congress
- Other political affiliations: Jannayak Janata Party

Ram Karan is an Indian politician. He was elected to the Haryana Legislative Assembly from Shahbad in the 2019 Haryana Legislative Assembly election as a member of the Jannayak Janta Party. He was re-elected in the 2024 Haryana Assembly election as a member of the Indian National Congress.
