= INSO =

INSO may refer to:

- Iraqi National Symphony Orchestra
- Indian National Students Organisation
- Stellent, a software company (former name)
