= Nagender Bhadana =

MLA of Haryana

Member of the Haryana Legislative Assembly
- In office 2014–2019
- Preceded by: Pt. Shiv Charan Lal Sharma
- Succeeded by: Neeraj Sharma
- Constituency: Haryana Legislative Assembly

Personal details
- Party: Bharatiya Janata Party
- Other political affiliations: Indian National Lok Dal
- Occupation: Politician

Nagender Bhadana was a member of the Haryana Legislative Assembly from the Indian National Lok Dal representing the Faridabad NIT Vidhan sabha Constituency in Haryana from 2014 to 2019. He joined Bharatiya Janata Party just before 2019 Haryana Legislative Assembly election.

== Electoral performance ==
2014 Haryana Legislative Assembly election: Faridabad NIT
Party	Candidate	Votes	%	±%
INLD	Nagender Bhadana	45,740	31.95%	▲27.16
Independent	Pandit Shiv Charan Lal Sharma	42,826	29.91%	New
BJP	Yashvir Singh	35,760	24.98%	▲16.68
BSP	Liyakat Ali	12,189	8.51%	▼1.12
INC	Gulshan Kumar Bagga	2,904	2.03%	▼16.56
Margin of victory		2,914	2.04%	▼7.36
Turnout		1,43,177	66.96%	▲2.12
Registered electors		2,13,818		▲65.37
INLD gain from Independent		Swing	▲3.96	

2019 Haryana Legislative Assembly election: Faridabad NIT
Party	Candidate	Votes	%	±%
INC	Neeraj Sharma	61,697	38.86%	▲36.83
BJP	Nagender Bhadana	58,455	36.82%	▲11.84
BSP	Hazi Karamat Ali	17,574	11.07%	▲2.56
Independent	Chander Bhatia	6,992	4.40%	New
Independent	Pradeep Rana	3,928	2.47%	New
AAP	Santosh Kumar Yadav	3,240	2.04%	New
NOTA	Nota	1,384	0.87%	New
INLD	Jagjit Pannu	1,240	0.78%	▼31.17
JJP	Tejpal	1,208	0.76%	New
Margin of victory		3,242	2.04%	▲0.01
Turnout		1,58,755	61.36%	▼5.60
Registered electors		2,58,714		▲21.00
INC gain from INLD		Swing	▲6.92	

2009 Haryana Legislative Assembly election: Faridabad NIT
Party	Candidate	Votes	%	±%
Independent	Pandit Shiv Charan Lal Sharma	23,461	27.98%	New
INC	Akagar Chand Chaudhry	15,586	18.59%	New
Independent	Nagender Bhadana	15,460	18.44%	New
BSP	Shiv Raj Lohia	8,074	9.63%	New
BJP	Mahender Bhadana	6,956	8.30%	New
INLD	Tejpal	4,011	4.78%	New
Independent	Dharambir Bhadhana	3,492	4.17%	New
RJD	Ved Prakash Yadav	2,565	3.06%	New
SP	Liyakat Ali	2,364	2.82%	New
CPI	Bechu Giri	939	1.12%	New
Margin of victory		7,875	9.39%	
Turnout		83,837	64.84%	
Registered electors		1,29,293		
Independent win (new seat)				
