= Bimla Chaudhary =

Indian politician

Member of the Haryana Legislative Assembly
- Incumbent
- Assumed office 2024
- Preceded by: Satya Prakash Jaravata
- Constituency: Pataudi
- In office 2014–2019
- Preceded by: Ganga Ram
- Succeeded by: Satya Prakash Jaravata
- Constituency: Pataudi

Personal details
- Born: 23 July 1967 (age 58)
- Party: Bharatiya Janata Party
- Spouse: Parkash Chand
- Children: 3

Bimla Chaudhary (born 1967) is an Indian politician from Haryana. She is a two time member of the Haryana Legislative Assembly representing the Bharatiya Janata Party from the Pataudi Assembly constituency which is reserved for Scheduled Caste community in Gurgaon district.

== Early life and education ==
Chaudhary is from Badshahpur, Gurgaon district, Haryana. She married late Prakash Chand. She studied Class 10 through National Institute of Open Schooling and passed the examination in 2018.

== Career ==
Chaudhary won from Pataudi Assembly constituency representing the Bharatiya Janata Party in the 2024 Haryana Legislative Assembly election. She polled 98,519 votes and defeated her nearest rival, Pearl Chaudhary of the Indian National Congress, by a margin of 46,530 votes. She first became an MLA winning the 2014 Haryana Legislative Assembly election where she polled 75,198 votes and defeated her nearest rival, Ganga Ram of the Indian National Lok Dal, by a margin of 38,963 votes.
