= Amit Sihag =

Indian politician (born 1981)

Amit Sihag Chautala

Member of Haryana Legislative Assembly
- In office 2019–2024
- Preceded by: Naina Singh Chautala
- Succeeded by: Aditya Devilal
- Constituency: Dabwali

Personal details
- Party: Indian National Congress

Amit Sihag Chautala (born 4 November 1981) is an Indian politician from Haryana. He was elected from Dabwali Assembly constituency in Sirsa district in the 2019 Haryana Legislative Assembly election, representing the Indian National Congress. He was nominated to contest from Dabwali in the 2024 election, but lost by some 400 votes to Aditya Devilal.

== Early life and education ==
Sihag is from Dabwali, Sirsa district, Haryana. He is the son of Kamalveer Singh. He completed B.Tech. in 2004 at MM College, Maulana and L.L.B. in 2008 at Doon College, Dehradun which is affiliated with Chaudhry Charan Singh University, Meerut.

== Career ==
Sihag won from Dabwali Assembly constituency representing the Indian National Congress in the 2019 Haryana Legislative Assembly election. He polled 66,885 votes and defeated his nearest rival, Aditya Devi Lal of the Bharatiya Janata Party, by a margin of 15,647 votes. Sihag lost the 2024 Haryana Legislative Assembly election to Indian National Lok Dal candidate Aditya Devilal.
