= Harnam Singh (politician) =

Indian politician

Member of the Haryana Legislative Assembly
- In office 1987–1991
- Preceded by: Tara Singh
- Succeeded by: Kharaiti Lal
- Constituency: Shahabad

Personal details
- Political party: Communist Party of India

Harnam Singh is an Indian politician and leader of Communist Party of India (CPI). He represented Shahabad constituency in the Haryana Legislative Assembly from 1987 to 1991.
