= Uklana Assembly constituency =

Constituency of the Haryana legislative assembly in India

Coordinates: 29.52°N 75.87°E

- Constituency No. 48 for the Haryana Legislative Assembly

Constituency details
- Country: India
- Region: North India
- State: Haryana
- District: Hisar district
- Lok Sabha constituency: Hisar
- Total electors: 2,16,019
- Reservation: SC

Member of Legislative Assembly
- 15th Haryana Legislative Assembly
- Incumbent Naresh Selwal
- Party: Indian National Congress
- Elected year: 2024

Uklana Assembly constituency is a reserved constituency in Hisar district. It is one of the 90 Haryana constituencies of Haryana state in northern India.

It is part of Hisar Lok Sabha constituency.

== Members of the Legislative Assembly ==
Year	Member	Party
Till 2009: Constituency did not exist
2009	Naresh Selwal	Indian National Congress
2014	Anoop Dhanak	Indian National Lok Dal
2019	Anoop Dhanak	Jannayak Janta Party
2024	Naresh Selwal	Indian National Congress

== Election results ==
=== Assembly Election 2024 ===
2024 Haryana Legislative Assembly election: Uklana
Party	Candidate	Votes	%	±%
INC	Naresh Selwal	78,448	54.21%	▲45.92
BJP	Anoop Dhanak	50,356	34.80%	▲4.93
INLD	Balraj Singh	11,447	7.91%	▲6.57
AAP	Narender Khanna	2,050	1.42%	▲0.61
JJP	Rohtash	1,218	0.84%	▼46.00
NOTA	None of the Above	627	0.43%	▼0.06
Margin of victory		28,092	19.41%	▲2.43
Turnout		1,44,715	67.03%	▼4.07
Registered electors		2,16,019		▲10.00
INC gain from JJP		Swing	▲7.36	

=== Assembly Election 2019 ===
2019 Haryana Legislative Assembly election: Uklana
Party	Candidate	Votes	%	±%
JJP	Anoop Dhanak	65,369	46.84%	New
BJP	Asha Khedar	41,676	29.87%	▲1.32
INC	Bala Devi	11,573	8.29%	▼10.56
Independent	Naresh Selwal	10,353	7.42%	New
BSP	Ch. Bhajan Lal	4,206	3.01%	▲1.66
INLD	Lalita Taank	1,873	1.34%	▼39.94
AAP	Manjit Ranga	1,132	0.81%	New
Margin of victory		23,693	16.98%	▲4.24
Turnout		1,39,545	71.10%	▼7.36
Registered electors		1,96,278		▲9.38
JJP gain from INLD		Swing	▲5.56	

=== Assembly Election 2014 ===
2014 Haryana Legislative Assembly election: Uklana
Party	Candidate	Votes	%	±%
INLD	Anoop Dhanak	58,120	41.28%	▲3.48
BJP	Seema Gaibipur	40,193	28.55%	▲25.94
INC	Naresh Selwal	26,535	18.85%	▼22.31
HJC(BL)	Brijlal	8,555	6.08%	▼7.19
HLP	Bharti Uklana	3,662	2.60%	New
BSP	Ravi Kumar Nangthala	1,910	1.36%	▼1.75
Margin of victory		17,927	12.73%	▲9.39
Turnout		1,40,781	78.45%	▲5.09
Registered electors		1,79,446		▲17.84
INLD gain from INC		Swing	▲0.13	

=== Assembly Election 2009 ===
2009 Haryana Legislative Assembly election: Uklana
Party	Candidate	Votes	%	±%
INC	Naresh Selwal	45,973	41.15%	New
INLD	Seema Devi	42,235	37.81%	New
HJC(BL)	Rajbala	14,820	13.27%	New
BSP	Sandeep	3,469	3.11%	New
BJP	Narsingh Dass	2,911	2.61%	New
Smast Bhartiya Party	Kavita	881	0.79%	New
Independent	Mahender Singh	704	0.63%	New
Independent	Raghuvir Singh	660	0.59%	New
Margin of victory		3,738	3.35%	
Turnout		1,11,709	73.36%	
Registered electors		1,52,276		
INC win (new seat)				

== See also ==
- Haryana Legislative Assembly
- Elections in Haryana
- Elections in India
- Lok Sabha
- Rajya Sabha
- Election Commission of India
