= Umed Singh (Haryana politician) =

Indian politician

Member of Haryana Legislative Assembly
- Incumbent
- Assumed office 8 October 2024
- Father: Sube Singh
- Preceded by: Naina Singh Chautala
- Constituency: Badhra

Personal details
- Party: Bharatiya Janata Party
- Education: Govt. Boys Sr. Sec. School, Laxmi Nagar, Delhi
- Profession: Politician

Military service
- Retired Officer: Indian Navy

Umed Singh Patuwas is an Indian politician from Patuwas, Charkhi Dadri, Haryana. He is a Member of the Haryana Legislative Assembly from 2024, representing Badhra Assembly constituency as a Member of the Bharatiya Janata Party.

== Early life ==
Umed Singh hails from Patuwas village in Charkhi Dadri district, Haryana.

== Education ==
He completed his education up to the 10th standard from Government Boys Senior Secondary School, Laxmi Nagar, Delhi, in 1988.

== See also ==
- 2024 Haryana Legislative Assembly election
- Haryana Legislative Assembly
