= Satya Prakash Jaravata =

Indian politician

Satya Prakash Jarawta is an Indian politician. He was elected to the Haryana Legislative Assembly from Pataudi in the 2019 Haryana Legislative Assembly election as a member of the Bharatiya Janata Party.
