= Neeraj Sharma =

Indian politician (born 1972)

Neeraj Sharma (born 25 September 1970) is an Indian politician from Haryana. He was an MLA from Faridabad NIT Assembly constituency in Faridabad district. He won the 2019 Haryana Legislative Assembly election representing the Indian National Congress.

== Early life and education ==
Sharma is from Faridabad NIT, Haryana.He was born in a Hindu Brahmin family. His father's name is Shiv Charan Sharma. He completed his graduation B.Com. at Rohtak in 1992.

== Career ==
Sharma won from Faridabad NIT Assembly constituency representing the Indian National Congress in the 2019 Haryana Legislative Assembly election. He polled 61,697 votes and defeated his nearest rival, Nagender Bhadana of the Bharatiya Janata Party, by a margin of 3,242 votes.
