= Ajay Singh Chautala =

Indian politician

Dr. Ajay Singh Chautala

Member of Haryana Legislative Assembly
- In office December 2009 – January 2013
- Preceded by: Dr. Sita Ram
- Succeeded by: Naina Singh Chautala
- Constituency: Dabwali

Member of Parliament, Lok Sabha
- In office October 1999 – February 2004
- Preceded by: Surender Singh
- Succeeded by: Kuldeep Bishnoi
- Constituency: Bhiwani

Member of Parliament, Rajya Sabha
- In office 2 August 2004 – 3 November 2009
- Constituency: Haryana

President of the Table Tennis Federation of India
- In office 7 February 2001 – 19 March 2013
- Preceded by: Vidya Charan Shukla
- Succeeded by: Prabhat Chandra Chaturvedi, (IAS)

Member of Rajasthan Legislative Assembly
- In office 1993–1998
- Preceded by: Suchitra Arya
- Succeeded by: Suchitra Arya
- Constituency: Nohar

Member of Rajasthan Legislative Assembly
- In office 1990–1993
- Preceded by: Narain Singh
- Succeeded by: Narain Singh
- Constituency: Danta Ramgarh

Personal details
- Born: 13 March 1961 (age 65) Chautala, Punjab, India
- Party: Jannayak Janta Party (2018 – present)
- Other political affiliations: Janata Party (1980 – 1988); Janata Dal (1988 – 1996); Indian National Lok Dal (1996 – 2018)
- Spouse: Naina Singh Chautala
- Children: 2 sons: Dushyant Chautala; Digvijay Chautala
- Parents: Om Prakash Chautala (father); Sneh Lata Chautala (mother)
- Education: Kurukshetra University; University of Rajasthan
- Occupation: Agriculturalist and politician

Ajay Singh Chautala (born 13 March 1961) is a former Indian MP and sports administrator. He is the elder son of former Chief Minister of Haryana Om Prakash Chautala and father of former Deputy Chief Minister of Haryana Dushyant Chautala.

== Biography ==
Ajay Singh Chautala is a son of Om Prakash Chautala, a former Chief Minister of Haryana, and a grandson of Chaudhary Devi Lal, a former deputy prime minister of India. He has two sons Dushyant Chautala, former deputy chief minister of Haryana (youngest MP, Hisar Haryana 16th Lok Sabha) and Digvijay Chautala (national President N INSO). He did his B.A. from Kurukshetra University, M.A. (Public Administration) and LL.B. from Rajasthan University. He entered active politics in the 1980s, and became MLA from Rajasthan twice: first from Danta Ramgarh (1989) and then from Nohar (1993).

Ajay became MP, Lok Sabha from Bhiwani in 1999. He then became MP, Rajya Sabha from Haryana in 2004. He then became MLA from Dabwali in 2009.

Later Ajay Singh's wife Naina Singh Chautala became MLA from Dabwali In 2014. Their son Dushyant Chautala was MP, Lok Sabha from Hisar from 2014 to 2019.

== Conviction in Recruitment scam ==
In June 2008 Chautala and 53 others were charged in connection with the appointment of 3,206 junior basic teachers in the state of Haryana during 1999 and 2000. In January 2013 a New Delhi court sentenced Chautala and his father Om Prakash Chautala to ten years' imprisonment under various provisions of the IPC and the Prevention of Corruption Act. Chautala was found guilty of illegally recruiting over 3,000 teachers. A CBI investigation was ordered by the Supreme Court based on a writ filed by former director of primary education Sanjeev Kumar, a 1989 batch IAS officer.

His and his father's sentences have been upheld by the Delhi High Court and the Supreme Court of India.

== See also ==
- Devi Lal
- Dynastic politics of Haryana
- Dushyant Chautala
