= Aditya Devilal =

Indian politician

Member of Haryana Legislative Assembly
- Incumbent
- Assumed office 8 October 2024
- Preceded by: Amit Sihag Chautala
- Constituency: Dabwali

Personal details
- Political party: Now Indian National Lok Dal, In 2019 election Bhartiya Janta Party
- Parent: Jagdish Chunder Chautala
- Profession: Politician

Aditya Devi Lal is an Indian politician from Haryana. He was elected as a Member of the Haryana Legislative Assembly in the 2024 elections, representing Dabwali Assembly constituency as a member of the Indian National Lok Dal.

== See also ==
- 2024 Haryana Legislative Assembly election
- Haryana Legislative Assembly
