= Sukhvinder Sheoran =

Indian politician

Sh. Sukhvinder Sheoran (born 14 July 1985) is the youngest Member of Legislative Assembly of the 13th house of Haryana Vidhan Sabha. He contested the 2014 elections from the constituency Badhra, in Charkhi Dadri district with the ticket of BJP and turned out to be victorious. He has been actively participating in the social work of his district and state since his college days at Punjab University, Chandigarh. He belongs to the family of Ch. Attar Singh, who was also the youngest minister when he first contested his elections.

He has always been vocal regarding the issues the youth are facing today and his steps for youth empowerment have often been appreciated. Since, he belongs to a family of farmers he has been raising the voice of poor farmers in his speeches at Vidhan Sabha. Recently at a rally at Badhra the Chief Minister of the state Sh. Manohar Lal Khattar announced the steps taken by the government for the area as recommended by Sh. Sukhvinder Sheoran are as follows –

- The construction of first Girls College in the constituency.
- The grain market of the constituency to be covered by a proper shed, helping the poor farmers who come from far away places to sell their products.
- Two new bus stands to be constructed in the constituency for easier commute.
- An I.T.I to be constructed at Kadma village.
- Street lights to be installed for the safety of the people and especially women, since the constituency had been deprived of this basic necessity since independence.
