= Dushyant Chautala =

Indian politician (born 1900)

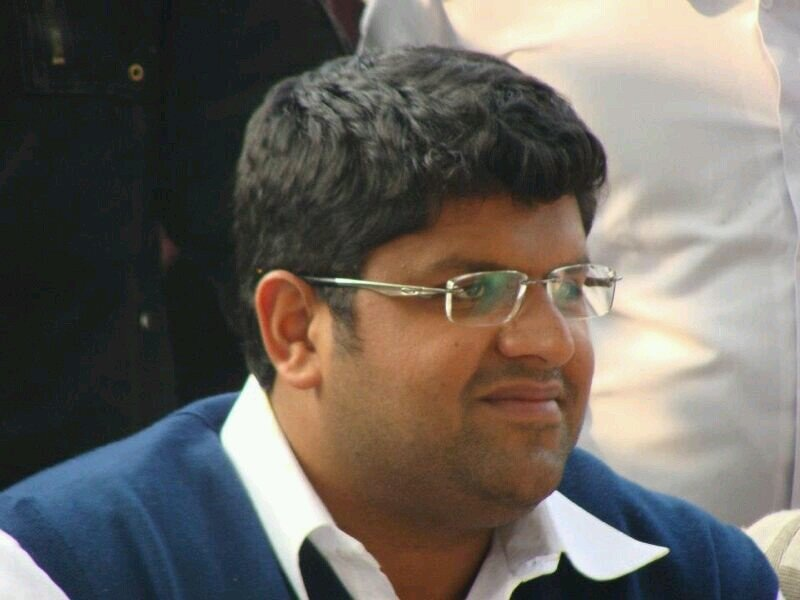

Deputy Chief Minister of Haryana
- In office 27 October 2019 – 12 March 2024
- Governor: Satyadev Narayan Arya; Bandaru Dattatreya
- Chief Minister: Manohar Lal Khattar
- Preceded by: Chander Mohan
- Succeeded by: Vacant

President of Jannayak Janta Party
- Incumbent
- Assumed office 9 December 2018
- Preceded by: Office Established

Member of the Haryana Legislative Assembly
- In office 24 October 2019 – 8 October 2024
- Preceded by: Premlata Singh
- Succeeded by: Devender Attri
- Constituency: Uchana

Member of Parliament, Lok Sabha
- In office 16 May 2014 – 23 May 2019
- Preceded by: Kuldeep Bishnoi
- Succeeded by: Brijendra Singh
- Constituency: Hisar

Executive Member, Indian Olympic Association
- In office 14 July 2019 – 31 July 2024

President, Table Tennis Federation of India
- In office 30 January 2017 – 30 January 2022

Personal details
- Born: 3 April 1988 (age 38) Hisar, Haryana, India
- Party: Jannayak Janta Party
- Other political affiliations: Indian National Lok Dal (till December 2018)
- Spouse: Meghna Ahlawat (m. 2017)
- Children: 1
- Parents: Ajay Singh Chautala (father); Naina Singh Chautala (mother)
- Education: California State University (BSc); National Law University, Delhi (LLM); Guru Jambheshwar University of Science and Technology (MA Mass Communication)
- Occupation: Politician

Dushyant Singh Chautala (born 3 April 1988) is an Indian politician who served as the 6th Deputy Chief Minister of Haryana from 2019 to 2024. He represented the Uchana Kalan constituency in Haryana Legislative Assembly from 2019 until 2024 and was sworn-in as Deputy Chief Minister of Haryana upon making an alliance with Bharatiya Janata Party after the 2019 Haryana Legislative Assembly election.

He is the co-founder and president of the Jannayak Janta Party or JJP, a party which was split from the Indian National Lok Dal. He founded the party on 9 December 2018.

He has also served as a Member of Parliament in the 16th Lok Sabha representing the Hisar constituency from the Indian National Lok Dal from 2014 to 2019. In 2019, he lost his seat under the JJP to the Bharatiya Janata Party. He has also been the President of Table Tennis Federation of India since 2017 and Executive Member of Indian Olympic Association since 2019.The JJP suffered a drubbing by the hands of the saffron tsunami in the state of Haryana in 2024 Assembly elections, where the BJP stormed back to power for the third consecutive time in the state. The party managed to garner just 0.9% of the votes and Dushyant Chautala lost his deposit, finishing fifth.

== Early life and education ==
Dushyant Chautala was born in the village of Daroli, Hisar, Haryana, on 3 April 1988 to Ajay Chautala and Naina Singh Chautala. He is the grandson of Om Prakash Chautala and the great grandson of former Deputy Prime Minister of India, Devi Lal. He is also the nephew of the Indian National Lok Dal leader, Abhay Singh Chautala. He comes from one of the most prominent Jat political dynasties of Haryana, and has a younger brother, Digvijay Chautala, who is also a politician.

Dushyant Chautala completed his initial schooling from St. Mary School, Hisar and The Lawrence School, Sanawar, Himachal Pradesh. He completed his Bachelors in Business Administration and Management from California State University, Bakersfield, California. He has done 'Masters of Law' from National Law University, Delhi. He married Meghna Chautala on 18 April 2017.

== Political career ==
=== Indian National Lok Dal ===
Dushyant Chautala's political career started under the Indian National Lok Dal, under the leadership of his grandfather, Om Prakash Chautala.

In the 2014 Lok Sabha Elections, Dushyant Chautala defeated Kuldeep Bishnoi from Haryana Janhit Congress (BL) by a margin of 31,847 votes to become the youngest ever elected Member of the Parliament at 26 for which he holds a record in the 'Limca Book of Records'. In 2017, Chautala became the first Indian to be conferred with the highest civilian honor by the Cooperation Commission of Arizona, USA.

On 9 December 2018, Dushyant Chautala launched the new party Jannayak Janata Party (JJP) after he was expelled from Indian National Lok Dal.

=== Formation of the Jannayak Janata Party ===
Jannayak Janata Party was formed by supporters of Dushyant Chautala in Jind, Haryana on 9 December 2018. The name of JJP party was inspired from the legacy of former Deputy Prime Minister of India, Chaudhary Devi Lal, who was often respectfully referred to as "Jan Nayak" or people's leader.

Dushyant Chautala was in a turf war over leadership of the Indian National Lok Dal (INLD) with his uncle Abhay Singh Chautala. Matters came to a head when Abhay Chautala dissolved the student wing of the INLD, the INSO, which triggered Dushyant to announce the formation of the JJP. Youth employment, senior citizen pension, fair support price for farmers, and women safety were the main issues held up during the 2019 election for the JJP.

Under the leadership of Dushyant Chautala, Jannayak Janata Party fought its first election for Jind legislative assembly seat by-election. In the Jind by-election, JJP got 37,631 votes and secured the second position.

=== Positions held as a Member of Parliament ===
Chautala was a Member, Standing Committee on Urban Development, 2014–2016. He was also a Member, Consultative Committee, Ministry of Skill Development and Entrepreneurship, 2015-2018; and a Member, Standing Committee on Commerce, 2016-2019.

=== Positions held in Sports Associations ===
Chautala was holding the position of President, Table Tennis Federation of India. He also served as a member of Indian Olympic Association's executive council.

== See also ==
- Devi Lal
- Jannayak Janta Party
- Indian National Lok Dal
- Dynastic politics of Haryana
