= Ranbir Singh Mahendra =

Indian politician and cricket administrator

27th President of BCCI
- In office 2004
- Preceded by: Jagmohan Dalmiya
- Succeeded by: Sharad Pawar

Member of the Haryana Legislative Assembly
- In office 2005 – 2009
- Constituency: Mundhal Khurd Assembly constituency

Ranbir Singh Mahendra (Hindi: रणबीर सिंह महेन्द्रा) is a politician in the Indian National Congress from Haryana, India and was President of Board for Control of Cricket in India (BCCI) from 2004 to 2005. He is the son of former Haryana chief minister Ch. Bansi Lal.

== Politics ==
Mahendra represented the Mundhal constituency in the Haryana Legislative Assembly.

== Cricket administration ==
He joined the BCCI in 1975, and ascended to the post of joint secretary in 1980. In 1985, he was elevated to the post of secretary, which he held for five years. He was one of the key administrators during the 1987 World Cup held in India, and was the driving force behind the Haryana Cricket Association. In 2001, he was elected as one of the vice presidents of the board.

== Personal life ==
Mahendra is a lawyer by profession. He is the son of Bansi Lal, a prominent politician who served as Chief Minister of Haryana, Railway Minister and Defence Minister of India. Mahendra's son, Anirudh Chaudhry has served as the treasurer of the BCCI.
