= Jannayak Janta Party =

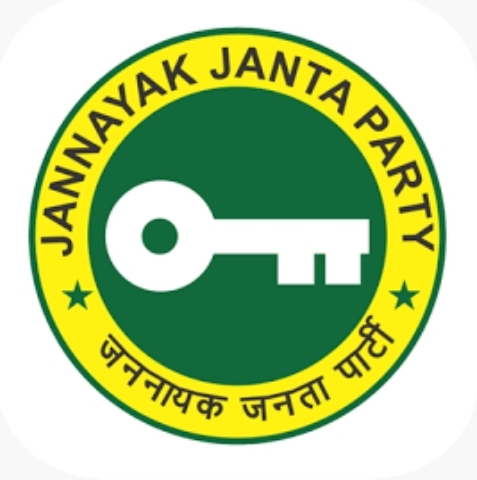
- Abbreviation: JJP
- Leader: Dushyant Chautala
- President: Ajay Singh Chautala
- Secretary: Digvijay Chautala
- General Secretary: Digvijay Chautala
- Founder: Ajay Singh Chautala; Dushyant Chautala
- Founded: 9 December 2018; 7 years ago, Jind, Haryana, India
- Split from: Indian National Lok Dal
- Headquarters: 18, Janpath, New Delhi
- Student wing: Indian National Students Organisation
- Colours: Yellow Green
- ECI status: Recognized State Party
- Alliance: ASP (2024); NDA (2019 – 2024)
- Seats in Rajya Sabha: 0 / 245
- Seats in Lok Sabha: 0 / 543
- Seats in Haryana Legislative Assembly: 0 / 90
- Number of states and union territories in government: 0 / 31

Election symbol

Party flag

Website
- www.jannayakjantaparty.com

The Jannayak Janta Party (JJP) is an Indian state-level political party in Haryana, India. JJP is a recognized state political party. JJP was founded on 9 December 2018 by Dushyant Chautala with the ideology of Devi Lal, who served as Deputy Prime Minister of India.

== Formation ==
JJP emerged from a split in the Indian National Lok Dal (INLD) which itself had been caused by infighting among the Chautala family. An INLD rally at Gohana in October 2018 had seen heckling of Abhay Chautala, a son of INLD leader Om Prakash Chautala for which Dushyant Chautala, a grandson, and his younger brother, Digvijay Chautala, were blamed.

When Dushyant and Digvijay were expelled from the INLD for allegedly permitting indiscipline at the rally, their father, Ajay Chautala, supported them and so he, too, was expelled from the INLD.

The JJP was formally launched at a rally in Jind in December 2018 by Dushyant Chautala who held a seat in the Lok Sabha of the national Parliament of India, from when he was an INLD member.

He said that the party's name was in honour of Devi Lal, a former Deputy Prime Minister of India whose supporters in Haryana refer to him as Jan Nayak, and that the party intended to follow his principles.

Dushyant's father, Ajay, absent from the Jind rally, being at that time in jail in relation to an alleged scam, as also was Om Prakash Chautala. Despite now being in opposite political factions, and claiming that the JJP was standing for values which the INLD had abandoned, Dushyant nonetheless asked supporters at the rally to chant "Long Live OP Chautala".

Abhay Chautala who was leading the INLD in the absence of Om Prakash Chautala reacted to the news by saying that "Everybody is not capable of floating a political party and then continue with it". At least three INLD MLAs, including Dushyant's mother, Naina Singh Chautala were early members of the new JJP.

JJP in their debut 2019 Haryana Legislative Assembly election won 10 seats and the party President Dushyant Chautala was appointed as the Deputy Chief Minister of Haryana on 25 October 2019.

It however drew a blank in the 2024 Haryana Legislative Assembly election and its vote share was reduced to just 0.9%. All but one of its candidates including former deputy cm Dushyant Chautala lost their election deposit.

== Flag and Symbol ==
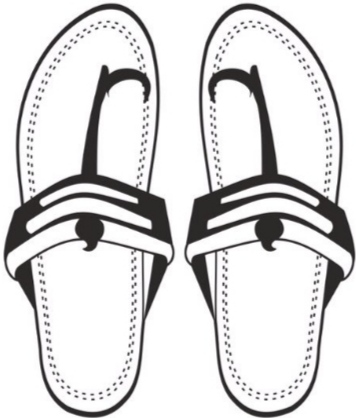
First Symbol used by JJP in 2019 election

The JJP has proposed a flag that is primarily green in colour, with a quarter in light yellow. Key is election symbol since June 2019. JJP said the colours symbolise- Green was also adopted as a symbolic colour by Devi Lal, whose picture appears in the flag and Yellow symbolically represents 'Yuva Urja'.

== Electoral Performance ==
=== Legislative Assembly elections ===
Election Year	Overall votes	% of overall votes	seats contested	seats won	+/- in seats	+/- in vote share	Sitting side
Haryana Legislative Assembly
2019	1,858,033	14.80	87	10	New Party	New Party	Right (Government-BJP coalition)
2024	125,022	0.90	66	0	▼10	▼13.9%	Lost

== Former State Ministers ==
=== Haryana ===
S.No	Name	Constituency	Department (2019-2024)	Party
1.	Dushyant Chautala	Uchana Kalan	Revenue and Disaster Management.; Excise and Taxation.; Development and Panchayats.; Industries and Commerce.; Public Works (B&R).; Food, Civil Supplies and Consumer Affairs.; Labour and Employment.; Civil Aviation.; Rehabilitation.; Consolidation.	JJP
2.	Anoop Dhanak	Uklana	Archaeology and Museums (Independent Charge); Labour and Employment (Attached with the Deputy Chief Minister)	JJP

== See also ==
- Devi Lal
- Dynastic politics of Haryana
- Dushyant Chautala
- List of political parties in India
