= Sadbhav Yatra =

Padayatra in Haryana

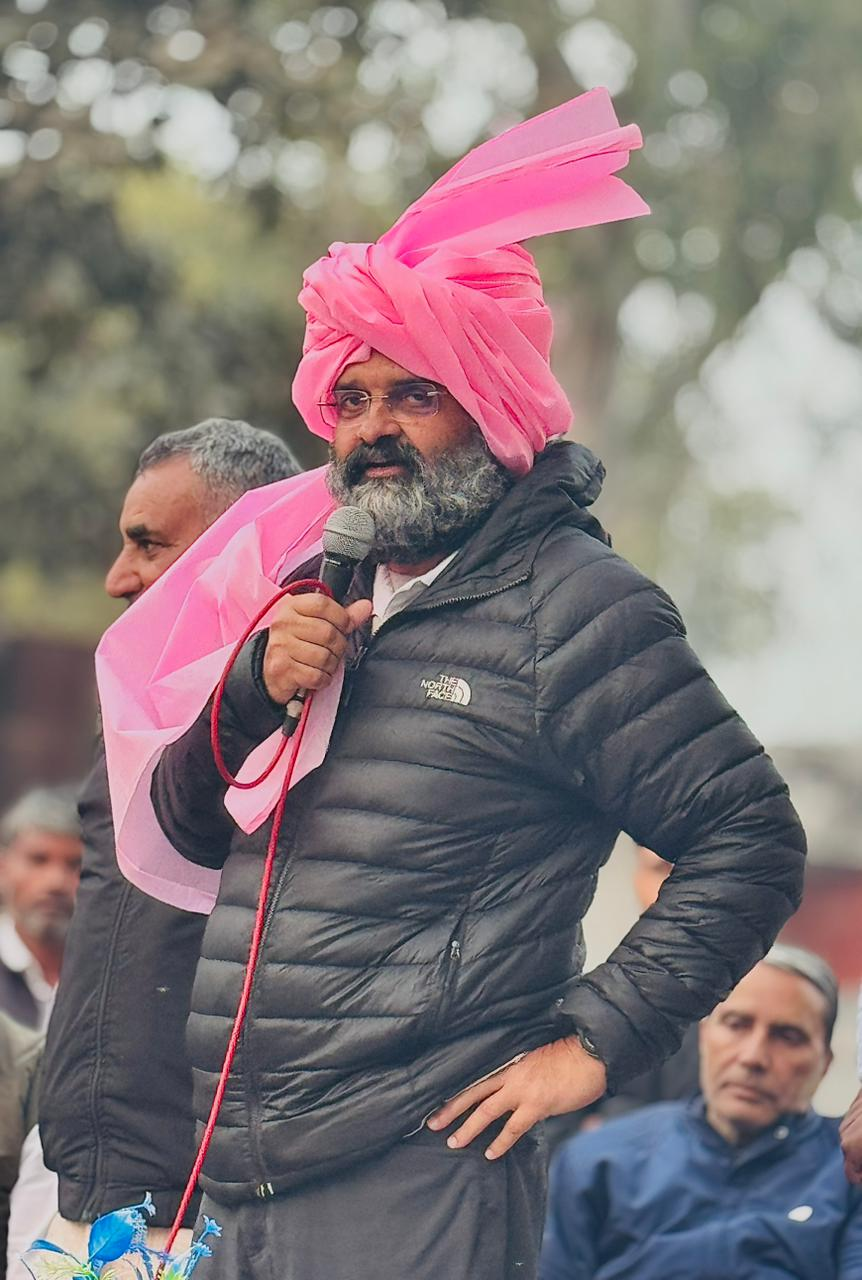
- Brijendra Singh addressing a public meeting during Sadbhav Yatra in January 2026
- Date: 5 October 2025 - 23 May 2026
- Location: Haryana
- Type: Padayatra, protest
- Theme: Political movement, social movement

Sadbhav Yatra was a padayatra across all 90 Assembly Constituencies of Haryana, led by Indian National Congress leader Brijendra Singh. The Yatra began on 5 October, 2025 from Narwana and concluded in Rohtak on 23 May, 2026.

== Background ==
The Yatra's aims included restoration of bhaichara (brotherhood) in Haryana, political revival of the Congress following electoral defeat in 2024, and raising awareness regarding national and state issues such as Vote Chori, unemployment, agrarian distress, deteriorating law and order situation in Haryana, and Indian foreign policy failures, among others.

Sadbhav Yatra was inspired by Rahul Gandhi's Bharat Jodo Yatra, which traversed over 4,000 kilometres from Kanyakumari to Jammu & Kashmir.

== Phases ==
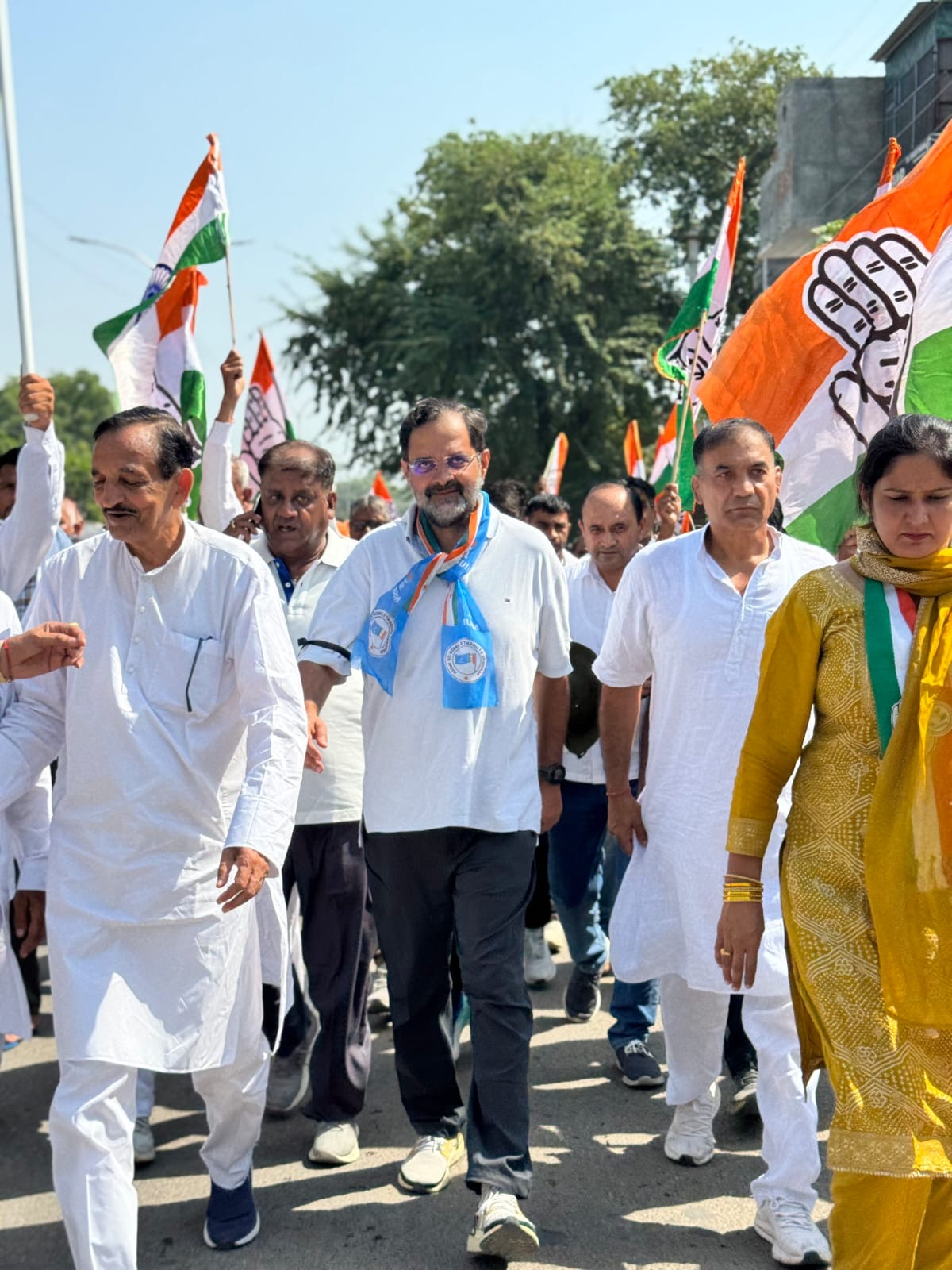
Brijendra Singh walking in the first phase of Sadbhav Yatra

The Yatra was divided into multiple phases. After the conclusion of each phase, a 'Samman Samaaroh' (felicitation ceremony) was held.

The first phase of Sadbhav Yatra covered 14 Assembly Constituencies between 5 October and 6 November 2025: Narwana, Jind, Kalayat, Safidon, Julana, Narnaund, Uchana, Uklana, Adampur, Nalwa, Hisar, Barwala, Hansi, and Bawani Khera. This phase was attended by Members of Parliament (MPs) Kumari Selja and Rahul Kaswan, former Union Minister Birender Singh, and MLA Aditya Surjewala.

The second phase was held between 11 November and 13 December 2025. It passed through Nangal Chaudhary, Narnaul, Mahendragarh, Loharu, Tosham, Bhiwani, Badhra, Dadri, Kalanaur, Maham, Gohana, Baroda, and Israna constituencies.

The third phase of Sadbhav Yatra, organised between 18 December 2025 and 22 January 2026, included Bawal, Rewari, Sohna, Nuh, Firozpur Jhirka, Punahana, Hathin, Hodal, Palwal, Prithla, Ballabgarh, NIT-Faridabad, Badkhal, Old Faridabad, and Tigaon. Former Haryana Minister Ajay Singh Yadav and former MP Pandit Ramkishan joined the Yatra in this phase, alongside District Congress Committee leadership.

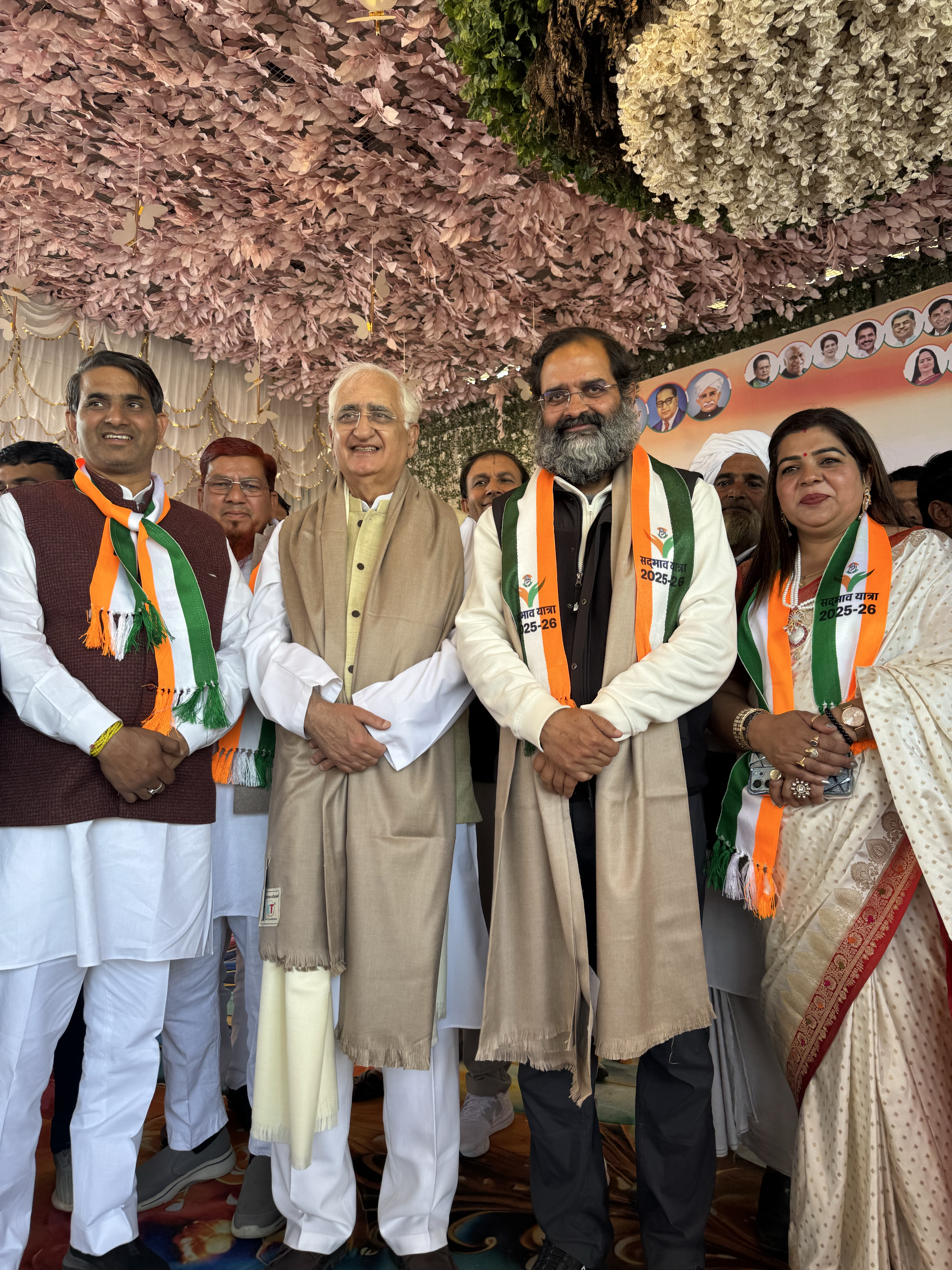
Salman Khurshid felicitating Sadbhav Yatra participants in Palwal

The fourth phase was held between 27 January and 1 March 2026, covering Yamunanagar, Jagadhri, Sadhaura, Kalka, Panchkula, Naraingarh, Mulana, Ambala Cantt, Ambala City, Shahbad, Thanesar, Radaur, Ladwa, Pehowa, and Guhla-Chika. It was attended by Haryana MLAs Akram Khan and Renu Bala.

The fifth phase of Sadbhav Yatra started on 6 March, and passed through Kaithal, Pundri, Nilokheri, Indri, Assandh, Tohana, Ratia, Fatehabad, Sirsa, Ellenabad, Rania, Dabwali, and Kalanwali, where it concluded on 31 March. Former Haryana Assembly Speaker Kuldeep Sharma and former MLAs Shamsher Singh Gogi and Balkaur Singh joined the Yatra. With this phase, the Yatra completed 2,000 kilometres and 62 constituencies. On this occasion, Leader of Opposition Rahul Gandhi unveiled the official t-shirt of Sadbhav Yatra alongside Brijendra Singh in Delhi on 12 March.

Rahul Gandhi launching the official t-shirt of Sadbhav Yatra on 12 March 2026

The sixth and final phase of Sadbhav Yatra began on 3 April from Karnal. Rahul Gandhi joined Brijendra Singh on the Yatra in Gurugram on 8 May, where Haryana Pradesh Congress Committee (HPCC) President Rao Narendra Singh, Leader of Opposition in the Haryana Assembly Bhupinder Singh Hooda, Haryana in-charge for All India Congress Committee B. K. Hariprasad, and Rajya Sabha MP Randeep Surjewala joined the Yatra and subsequent public meeting.

Rao Narendra and Rajya Sabha MP Karamvir Singh Boudh joined the Yatra in Badli. The Yatra concluded in Rohtak on 23 May. Its 'Samapan Samaroh' was attended by Rao Narendra, Surjewala, Sharma, AICC Secretary Jitendra Baghel, and former HPCC president Dharam Pal Singh Malik.
