= Haryana Pradesh Congress Committee =

Haryana affiliate of the Indian National Congress

- Abbreviation: HPCC
- President: Rao Narendra Singh
- Chairman: Bhupinder Singh Hooda
- General Secretary: B. K. Hariprasad
- Headquarters: Kothi No.140, Sector-9B Chandigarh-160009
- Youth wing: Haryana Youth Congress
- Women's wing: Haryana Pradesh Mahila Congress Committee
- Ideology: Farmers' rights Social democracy Secularism; Indian nationalism Civic nationalism Progressivism; Liberalism; Third Way
- Political position: Centre
- ECI status: A State Unit of Indian National Congress
- Alliance: Indian National Developmental Inclusive Alliance
- Seats in Rajya Sabha: 1 / 5
- Seats in Lok Sabha: 5 / 10
- Seats in Haryana Legislative Assembly: 37 / 90

Election symbol

The Haryana Pradesh Congress Committee or (HPCC ) is the state unit of the Indian National Congress (INC) in the state of Haryana, India. It is responsible for organizing and coordinating the party's activities and campaigns within the state, as well as selecting candidates for local, state, and national elections. The HPCC's headquarters are located in Chandigarh. The current president of the Haryana Pradesh Congress Committee is Rao Narendra Singh, a former Member of the Legislative Assembly (MLA).

The committee has been involved in several political events in the state's history, including the formation of the first democratically elected government in the state in 1967.

== Structure and composition ==
S.no	Name	Designation
1.	B.K. Hariprasad	AICC Incharge
2.	Rao Narendra Singh	President; Haryana Pradesh Congress Committee
3.	Sudha Bharadwaj	President; Haryana Pradesh Mahila Congress
4.	Divyanshu Buddhiraja	President; Haryana Pradesh Youth Congress
5.	Avinash Yadav	President; Haryana Pradesh NSUI
6.	Bhupinder Singh Hooda	CLP Leader; Haryana Legislative Assembly
7.	TBD	Deputy CLP Leader; Haryana Legislative Assembly

== Ideology and political positions ==
The Indian National Congress (INC) in Haryana adheres to the fundamental principles of secularism, democracy, and social justice. In line with the national party's vision, the INC in Haryana focuses on addressing regional concerns while promoting inclusive development and equitable growth. The party is particularly committed to the welfare of marginalized communities, including farmers, who are central to its agenda.

In Haryana, the INC has actively worked to implement policies that support agricultural development and improve rural infrastructure. This includes advocating for fair crop prices, enhancing irrigation facilities, and providing financial assistance to farmers in distress. The party's initiatives are aimed at sustainable agricultural practices and rural empowerment. Additionally, the INC emphasizes transparent governance, women's empowerment, and the strengthening of educational and healthcare systems to uplift the overall quality of life for the state's citizens.

== List of presidents ==
S.no	President	Portrait	Term		Duration
1.	Bhagwat Dayal Sharma		4–8–1966	16–11–1966	104 days
2.	Ram Kishan Gupta		19–11–1966	9–11–1969	2 years, 355 days
3.	Ramchandra Mittal		2–1–1970	10–12–1972	2 years, 343 days
4.	Rao Nihal Singh		11–12–1972	04–07–1977	4 years, 205 days
5.	Ranbir Singh Hooda		05–07–1977	01–01–1978	180 days
6.	Sultan Singh		8–11–1978	02–11–1979	359 days
7.	Chaudhary Dalbir Singh		3–11–1979	10–06–1980	220 days
8.	Sardar Harpal Singh		17–09–1980	10–06–1982	1 year, 266 days
(6).	Sultan Singh		11–06–1982	08–10–1985	3 years, 119 days
9.	Choudhary Birendra Singh		9–10–1985	19–04–1986	192 days
(8).	Sardar Harpal Singh		14–05–1986	07–09–1987	1 year, 116 days
10.	Balbir Pal Shah		08–09–1987	06–02–1989	1 year, 151 days
11.	Shamsher Singh Surjewala		07–02–1989	30–09–1990	1 year, 235 days
(9).	Chaudhary Birendra Singh		01–10–1990	10–04–1992	1 year, 192 days
12.	Dharam Pal Singh Malik		11–04–1992	27–02–1997	4 years, 322 days
13.	Bhupinder Singh Hooda		28–02–1997	31–07–2002	5 years, 153 days
14.	Bhajan Lal Bishnoi		01–08–2002	02–07–2006	3 years, 335 days
15.	Phool Chand Mullana		27–08–2007	10–02–2014	6 years, 167 days
16.	Ashok Tanwar		14–02–2014	04–09–2019	5 years, 202 days
17.	Kumari Selja		04–09–2019	27–04–2022	2 years, 235 days
18.	Udai Bhan		27–04–2022	28-09-2025	3 years, 154 days
19.	Rao Narendra Singh		29-09-2025	Incumbent	348 days

== Haryana Pradesh Legislative Assembly election ==
Year	Party leader	Seats won	Change in seats	Outcome
1967	Bhagwat Dayal Sharma	48 / 81	New	Government
1968	Bansi Lal	48 / 81	Steady	Government
1972	Bansi Lal	52 / 81	▲4	Government
1977	Bansi Lal	3 / 90	▼49	Opposition
1982	Bhajan Lal	36 / 90	▲33	Government
1987	Bansi Lal	5 / 90	▼31	Opposition
1991	Bhajan Lal	51 / 90	▲46	Government
1996	Bhajan Lal	9 / 90	▼42	Opposition
2000	Bhajan Lal	21 / 90	▲12	Opposition
2005	Bhajan Lal	67 / 90	▲46	Government
2009	Bhupinder Singh Hooda	40 / 90	▼27	Government
2014	Bhupinder Singh Hooda	15 / 90	▼25	Opposition
2019	Bhupinder Singh Hooda	31 / 90	▲16	Opposition
2024	Bhupinder Singh Hooda	37 / 90	▲6	Opposition

Haryana Congress Legislative Assembly seat count

== List of chief ministers ==
S.no	Name	Portrait	Constituency	Term			Assembly
1.	B. D. Sharma		Jhajjar	1 November 1966	21 February 1967	142 days	1st (1962 elections)
1.	B. D. Sharma		Jhajjar	21 February 1967	24 March 1967	142 days	2nd (1967 elections)
2.	Bansi Lal		Tosham	22 May 1968	14 March 1972	11 years, 282 days	3rd (1968 elections)
2.	Bansi Lal		Tosham	14 March 1972	30 November 1975	11 years, 282 days	4th (1972 elections)
2.	Bansi Lal		Tosham	5 June 1986	19 June 1987	11 years, 282 days	6th (1982 elections)
3.	Banarsi Das Gupta		Bhiwani	1 December 1975	30 April 1977.	1 year, 150 days	4th (1972 elections)
4.	Bhajan Lal Bishnoi		Adampur	23 May 1982	5 June 1986	11 years, 298 days	6th (1982 elections)
4.	Bhajan Lal Bishnoi		Adampur	23 July 1991	9 May 1996	11 years, 298 days	8th (1991 election)
5.	Bhupinder Singh Hooda		Garhi Sampla-Kiloi	5 March 2005	19 October 2014	9 years, 235 days	11th (2005 elections)
5.	Bhupinder Singh Hooda		Garhi Sampla-Kiloi	5 March 2005	19 October 2014	9 years, 235 days	12th (2009 elections)

== List of deputy chief ministers ==
S.no	Name	Portrait	Constituency	Term	
1.	Chand Ram		Jhajjar	1967	1967
2.	Chander Mohan	Frameless	Kalka	15 March 2005	7 December 2008

== List of leader of opposition ==
S.no	Name	Portrait	Constituency	Term	
1.	Shamsher Singh Surjewala		Narwana	1977	1979
2.	Bhupinder Singh Hooda		Garhi Sampla-Kiloi	2001	2004
2.	Bhupinder Singh Hooda		Garhi Sampla-Kiloi	4 September 2019	27 October 2019
2.	Bhupinder Singh Hooda		Garhi Sampla-Kiloi	2 November 2019	12 September 2024
2.	Bhupinder Singh Hooda		Garhi Sampla-Kiloi	29 September 2025	Incumbent

== Prominent members ==
Prominent Members of HPCC
Leader	Office held/current	Ref
Bhupinder Singh Hooda	Former Chief minister (2005–2014); Former President Haryana PCC; (1996–2002); Former Lok Sabha MP from Rohtak; Leader of Opposition in Haryana Assembly.; MLA from Garhi Sampla-Kiloi.	
Selja Kumari	MP Lok Sabha from Sirsa.; Former minister of social justice and empowerment, former minister of tourism in second Manmohan Singh ministry.; Former Rajya Sabha MP, former MP Lok Sabha from Ambala (2004–2014). Former President Haryana Pradesh Congress Committee; (2019–2022).; General secretary of AICC for Uttarakhand.	
Randeep Surjewala	National Spokesperson of AICC.; MP Rajya Sabha.; Former MLA from Narwana and Kaithal.; General secretary of AICC for Karnataka	
Jai Parkash	MP Lok Sabha from Hisar.; Former deputy minister in Ministry of Petroleum and Chemicals in central government.	
Deepender Hooda	MP Lok Sabha from Rohtak.; Former Rajya Sabha MP.; Secretary in AICC.	
Birender Singh	Former MP Lok Sabha from Hisar.; Former MP Rajya Sabha.; Former President Haryana Pradesh Congress Committee; (1985–1986, 1990–1992).	
Brijendra Singh	Former MP Lok Sabha from Hisar.	

== Lok Sabha general elections (M.P. in Haryana) ==
Lok Sabha Elections
Year	Lok Sabha	Party Leader	Seats contested	Seats won	(+/−) in seats	% of votes	Vote swing	Popular vote	Outcome
1967	4th	Indira Gandhi	9	7 / 9 (78%)		44.06%		13,44,830	Government
1971	5th	Indira Gandhi	9	7 / 10 (70%)		52.56%		15,72,929	Government
1977	6th	Indira Gandhi	9	0 / 10 (0%)		17.95%		7,44,862	Opposition
1980	7th	Indira Gandhi	10	5 / 10 (50%)		32.55%		14,26,261	Government
1984	8th	Rajiv Gandhi	10	10 / 10 (100%)		54.95%		27,87,655	Government
1989	9th	Rajiv Gandhi	10	4 / 10 (40%)		46.15%		28,16,831	Opposition
1991	10th	P. V. Narasimha Rao	10	9 / 10 (90%)		37.22%		23,10,003	Government
1996	11th	P. V. Narasimha Rao	10	2 / 10 (20%)		22.64%		17,23,087	Opposition
1998	12th	Sitaram Kesri	10	3 / 10 (30%)		26.02%		19,65,397	Opposition
1999	13th	Sonia Gandhi	10	0 / 10 (0%)		34.93%		24,35,752	Opposition
2004	14th	Sonia Gandhi	10	9 / 10 (90%)		42.13%		34,09,950	Government
2009	15th	Manmohan Singh	10	9 / 10 (90%)		41.77%		34,07,291	Government
2014	16th	Rahul Gandhi	10	1 / 10 (10%)		22.92%		26,34,905	Opposition
2019	17th	Rahul Gandhi	10	0 / 10 (0%)		28.42%		36,04,106	Opposition
2024	18th	Mallikarjun Kharge	9	5 / 10 (50%)		43.67%		56,79,473	Opposition

Haryana Congress Lok Sabha seat count

== District Congress Committee presidents ==

S.No	District	DCC	President
1	Ambala	Ambala Cantt.	Parvinder Pari
2	Ambala	Ambala City	Pawan Agrawal
3	Ambala	Ambala Rural	Dushyant Chauhan
4	Bhiwani	Bhiwani Rural	Anirudh Chaudhary
5	Bhiwani	Bhiwani Urban	Pradeep Gulia
6	Charkhi Dadri	Charkhi Dadri	Shushil Dhanak
7	Faridabad	Faridabad	Baljeet Kaushik
8	Faridabad	Fatehabad	Arvind Sharma
9	Gurgaon	Gurgaon Ruaral	Vardhan Yadav
10	Gurgaon	Gurgaon Urban	Pankaj Dawar
11	Hisar	Hisar Rural	Brij lal Khoval
12	Hisar	Hisar Urban	Bajarang Das Garg
13	Jhajjar	Jhajjar	Sanjay Yadav
14	Jind	Jind	Rishi Pal
15	Kaithal	Kaithal	Ramachander Gujjar
16	Karnal	Karnal Rural	Rajesh Vaid
17	Karnal	Karnal Urban	Parag Gaba
18	Kurukshetra	Kurukshetra	Mewa Singh
19	Mahendragarh	Mahendragarh	Satyavir Yadav
20	Mewat	Mewat(Nuh)	Shahida Khan
21	Palwal	Palwal	Netrapal Adhana
22	Panchkula	Panchkula	Sanjay Chauhan
23	Panipat	Panipat	Ramesh Malik
24	Rewari	Rewari Rural	Shubhash Chand Chawri
25	Rewari	Rewari Urban	Praveen Chaudhary
26	Rohtak	Rohtak Rural	Balwan Singh Ranga
27	Rohtak	Rohtak Urban	Santosh Beniwal
28	Sirsa	Sirsa	Kuldeep Singh
29	Sonepat	Sonipat Rural	Sanjeev Kumar Dahiya
30	Sonepat	Sonipat Urban	Kamal Dewan
31	Yamunanagar	Yamuna Nagar Rural	Nar Pal Singh
32	Yamunanagar	Yamuna Nagar Urban	Devendra Singh

== See also ==
- Indian National Congress
- Congress Working Committee
- All India Congress Committee
- Pradesh Congress Committee
- All India Mahila Congress
- Indian Youth Congress
- National Students Union of India
- Politics of Haryana
- Elections in Haryana
