= First Hooda ministry =

- Ministry of the State of Haryana
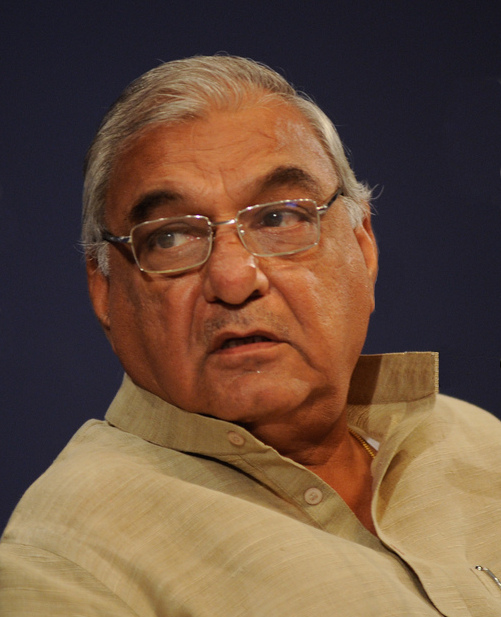
- Bhupinder Singh Hooda; Hon'ble Chief Minister of Haryana
- Date formed: 5 March 2005
- Date dissolved: 25 October 2009

People and organisations
- Head of state: Akhlaqur Rahman Kidwai (Governor)
- Head of government: Bhupinder Singh Hooda
- Deputy head of government: Chander Mohan
- No. of ministers: 11
- Member parties: INC
- Status in legislature: Majority
- Opposition party: INLD

History
- Election: 2005
- Predecessor: Om Prakash Chautala ministry
- Successor: Second Hooda ministry

INC secured absolute majority in 2005 Haryana Legislative Assembly election. Bhupinder Singh Hooda was elected leader of the party in the assembly and was sworn in as Chief Minister of Haryana in March 2005.

Here is the list of the ministers:

== Council of Ministers ==
SI No.	Name	Constituency	Department	Party
1.	Bhupinder Singh Hooda; Chief Minister	Garhi Sampla-Kiloi	Minister of Home, Town & Country planning and Urban estates, General Administration, Administration of Justice, Electronics and Information technology, Personnel and training, Raj Bhavan affairs and Renewable energy.	INC
2.	Chander Mohan; Deputy Chief Minister	Kalka	Minister of Food and Supplies.	INC
3.	Venod Sharma	Ambala City	Minister of Excise and Taxation and Forests.	INC
4.	Chaudhary Birender Singh	Uchana Kalan	Minister of Finance and Labour and Employment.	INC
5.	Surender Singh	Tosham	Minister of Agriculture and Revenue.	INC
6.	Kartar Devi	Kalanaur	Minister of Health, Social Welfare, Welfare of Scheduled Castes and Backward Classes.	INC
7.	Ajay Singh Yadav	Rewari	Minister of Irrigation and Elections.	INC
8.	Om Prakash Jindal	Hisar	Minister of Power and Printing and Stationery.	INC
9.	Phool Chand Mullana	Mulana	Minister of Education and Languages and Industrial Training and Vocational Education.	INC
10.	Lachhman Dass Arora	Sirsa	Minister of Industries and Urban Development.	INC
11.	Randeep Singh Surjewala	Kaithal	Minister of Transport and Parliamentary Affairs.	INC

== Ministers of State ==
SI No.	Department	Minister	Term		Constituency	Party
1.	Minister of State: Forest; Environment; Tourism; Sports	Kiran Chaudhary	2005	2009	Tosham	INC
2.	Minister of State: Revenue & Disaster Management; Consolidation; Rehabilitation & Housing; Urban Local bodies	Savitri Jindal	2005	2009	Hisar	INC
3.		Meena Rani	2005	2009	Jundla	INC
