= Surjewala =

Surjewala is a surname. People with the surname include:

- Randeep Surjewala
- Shamsher Singh Surjewala
- Aditya Surjewala

== See also ==
- Political families of Haryana#Surjewala/ Nain clan of Jind-Kaithal areas
