= Second Hooda ministry =

- Ministry of Haryana
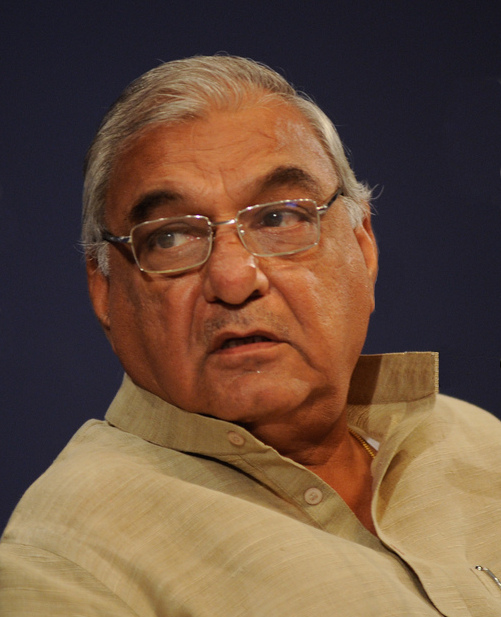
- Date formed: 25 October 2009
- Date dissolved: 26 October 2014

People and organisations
- Governor: Jagannath Pahadia (25 October 2009 – 26 July 2014); Kalyan Singh (27 July 2014 – 26 October 2014)
- Chief Minister: Bhupinder Singh Hooda
- No. of ministers: 14
- Member parties: INC
- Status in legislature: Minority
- Opposition party: INLD
- Opposition leader: Om Prakash Chautala

History
- Election: 2009
- Legislature terms: 5 years, 1 day
- Predecessor: First Hooda ministry
- Successor: First Khattar ministry

Bhupinder Singh Hooda, the leader of INC was sworn in as the chief minister of Haryana on 25 October 2009.

== History ==
On 25 October 2009, Bhupinder Singh Hooda took oath as cm alone. His cabinet expanded on 7 November 2009 with 6 cabinet ministers and 3 minister of State.

== Council of Ministers ==
Sr. No.	Name	Designation	Portfolio(s)	Took Office	Left Office	Party
Chief Minister
1.	Bhupinder Singh Hooda	Chief Minister	Home; General Administration; Justice Administration; Law; Town and Country Planning; Urban Estates; All other departments not allotted to any other Minister	25 October 2009	26 October 2014	INC
Cabinet Minister
2.	Ajay Singh Yadav	Minister	Finance; Planning; Institutional Finance; Irrigation; Forests; Environment	7 November 2009	14 June 2011	INC
2.	Ajay Singh Yadav	Minister	Power; Forests; Environment	14 June 2011	29 July 2014	INC
3.	Randeep Singh Surjewala	Minister	Public Health Engineering; Parliamentary Affairs; Electronics & IT; Science and Technology; Public Works	7 November 2009	28 January 2011	INC
3.	Randeep Singh Surjewala	Minister	Industries & Commerce; Parliamentary Affairs; Science & Technology; Public Works	28 January 2011	26 October 2014	INC
4.	Mahender Pratap Singh	Minister	Power; Renewable Energy; Labour & Employment; Food & Supplies; Urban Local Bodies; Industries & Commerce	7 November 2009	28 January 2011	INC
4.	Mahender Pratap Singh	Minister	Power; Renewable Energy; Technical Education	28 January 2011	14 June 2011	INC
4.	Mahender Pratap Singh	Minister	Revenue; Consolidation; Rehabilitation; Food & Supplies; Technical Education	14 June 2011	26 October 2011	INC
5.	Om Prakash Jain	Minister	Transport; Tourism; Civil Aviation; Hospitality	7 November 2009	9 June 2011	Independent
6.	Paramvir Singh	Minister	Agriculture; Animal Husbandry & Dairying; Fisheries; Cooperation	7 November 2009	28 January 2011	INC
6.	Paramvir Singh	Minister	Agriculture; Animal Husbandry & Dairying; Fisheries; Mines & Geology	28 January 2011	26 October 2014	INC
7.	Geeta Bhukkal	Minister	Education & Languages; Social Justice & Empowerment; Women & Child Development; Welfare of SCs & BCs; Health; Printing & Stationery	7 November 2009	28 January 2011	INC
7.	Geeta Bhukkal	Minister	Education & Languages; Social Justice & Empowerment; Women & Child Development; Welfare of SCs & BCs; Industrial Training; Archaeology & Museums; Archives	28 January 2011	26 October 2014	INC
8.	Harmohinder Singh Chatha	Minister	Cooperation; Food & Supplies	28 January 2011	14 June 2011	INC
8.	Harmohinder Singh Chatha	Minister	Finance; Planning; Institutional Finance; Irrigation; Renewable Energy	14 June 2011	26 October 2014	INC
9.	Kiran Chaudhary	Minister	Public Health; Engineering; Excise and Taxation	28 January 2011	26 October 2014	INC
10.	Rao Narendra Singh	Minister	Health; Medical Education; Elections	28 January 2011	26 October 2014	INC
11.	Satpal Sangwan	Minister	Revenue; Disaster management; ConsolidationRehabilitation; Rehabilitation	28 January 2011	14 June 2011	INC
11.	Satpal Sangwan	Minister	Cooperation; Housing	14 June 2011	26 October 2014	INC
12.	Savitri Jindal	Minister	Urban Local Bodies	29 October 2013	26 October 2014	INC
13.	Aftab Ahmed	Minister	Transport	29 October 2013	26 October 2014	INC
14.	Shiv Charan Lal Sharma	Minister of State	Revenue; Disaster Management; Consolidation; Rehabilitation	7 November 2009	28 January 2011	Independent
14.	Shiv Charan Lal Sharma	Minister of State	Labour & Employment (I/C); Information; PR & Cultural Affairs	28 January 2011	26 October 2014	Independent
15.	Gopal Goyal Kanda	Minister of State	Home; Sports & Youth Affairs; Industries & Commerce	7 November 2009	28 January 2011	Independent
15.	Gopal Goyal Kanda	Minister of State	Urban Local Bodies (I/C); Industries & Commerce; Home	28 January 2011	6 August 2012	Independent
16.	Sukhbir Kataria	Minister of State	Agriculture; Cooperation	7 November 2009	28 January 2011	Independent
16.	Sukhbir Kataria	Minister of State	Sports & Youth Affairs (I/C); Agriculture; Cooperation	28 January 2011	26 October 2014	Independent
