= Shokeen =

Jat clan of Sidhu origin

Shokeen (Note: Shokeen or Sheokand caste of Sidhu dynastyShokeen or Sheokand is an Jat Khap in the Jind state which generally referred to the branch of the Jat caste, gained social prestige by forming marriage alliances with Sidhu households of the Phulkian dynasty, a powerful faction in Sikh history.) is a Jat surname. Notable people with the surname include:

- Birender Singh Sheokand, Former Union Minister
- Brijendra Singh Sheokand, Former Member of Parliament
- Premlata Singh Sheokand, Former Mla
- Rajeshwar Dayal Sheokand IAS Haryana Chairman HPSC, Chairman HSEB, Chairman HSEIAA {Village Sudkain Kalan}
- Dr Maheshwar Dayal IPS, DG Prisons Tamilnadu, Ex Head CoBRA Force, CRPF MHA
- Devender Singh Shokeen (born 1967), Indian bureaucrat and politician
- Hrithik Shokeen (born 2000), Indian cricketer
- Manoj Kumar Shokeen (born 1967), Indian politician, Bharatiya Janata Party leader
- Nishant Shokeen, Indian film and television actor
- Raghuvinder Shokeen, Indian politician, Member of the Delhi Legislative Assembly
- Vivek Shokeen (born 1987), Indian tennis player

== See also ==
- List of Jats
- Shaukeen
- Indian family names
