= Roshan Pura =

Roshan Pura Dichaon Khurd
- Village
- Location in India
- Coordinates: 28.599760°N 76.986800°E
- Country: India
- State: Delhi
- District: South West

Population (2001)
  - Total: 38,580

Languages
  - Official: Hindi, English
- Time zone: UTC+5:30 (IST)

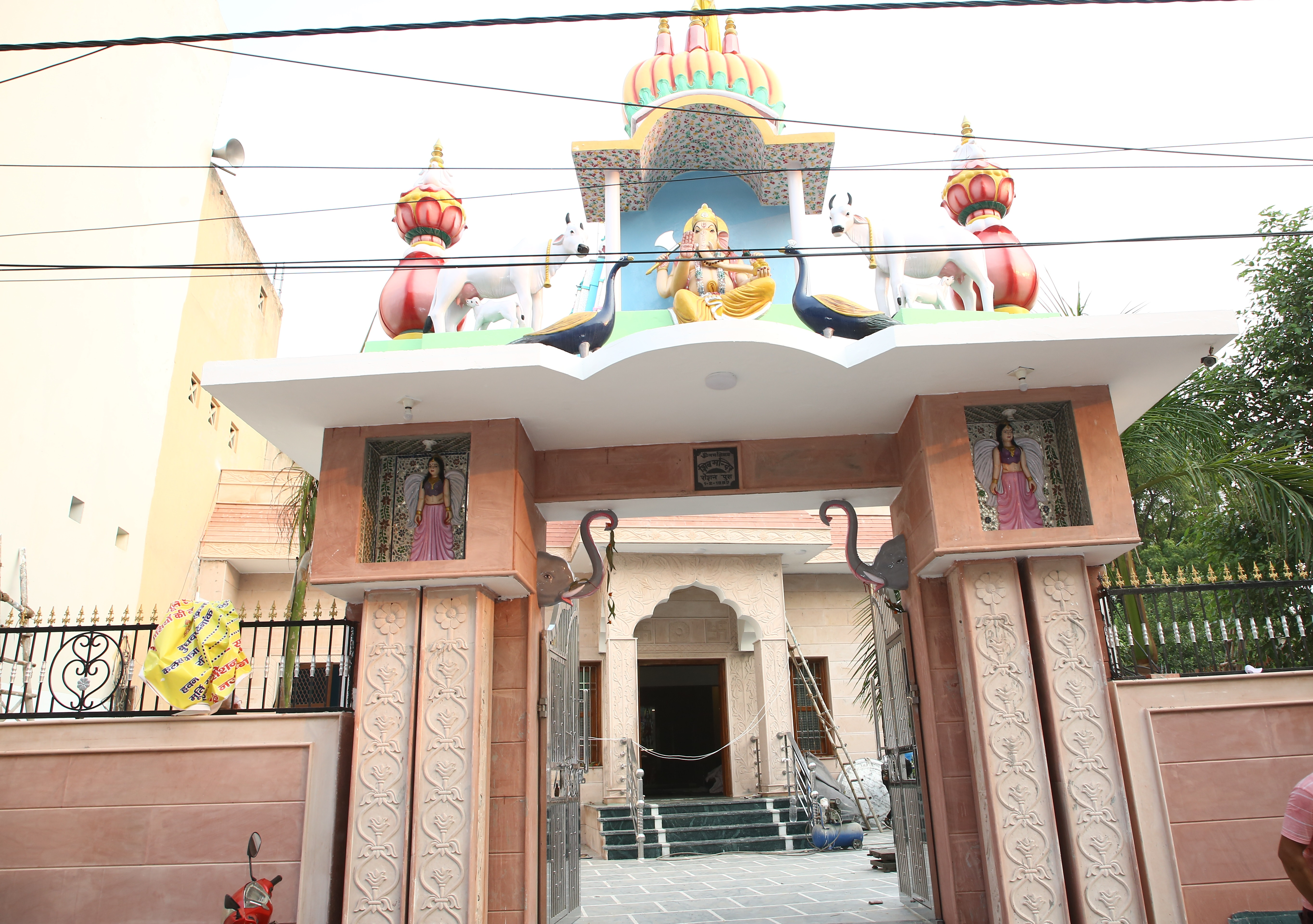
Shiv Mandir in Roshan Pura

Roshan Pura (also known as Dichaon Khurd), is an urbanised village in South-west Delhi, near Najafgarh. It is located on Najafgarh-Gurgaon Road. Khurd and Kalan are Persian language words which mean small and big respectively, used to distinguish the village from the adjacent Dichaon Kalan in Najafgarh tehsil. It is inhabited mainly by Shokeen (also known as Shokhanda) Jat clan. It is a planned village with wide roads and all the basic facilities: proper water supplies, sewage etc. The village has given two Army Officers to the Nation these are Major Rajbir and Captain Vinay Shokeen. Both the officers are presently serving the Nation.

== Demographics ==
As of 2001 Roshan Pura had a population of 38,580. The population was 54% male, and 15% of the population was 6 years of age or younger. 71% of the total population (including children) was literate .
