= Krishan Kumar (Narwana politician) =

Haryana politician

Cabinet Minister, Government of Haryana
- Incumbent
- Assumed office 17 October 2024
- Governor: Bandaru Dattatreya
- Chief Minister: Nayab Singh Saini
- Ministry and Departments: Social Justice, Empowerment; SCs & BCs Welfare and Antyodaya (SEWA); Hospitality; Architecture

Member of Haryana Legislative Assembly
- Incumbent
- Assumed office 8 October 2024
- Preceded by: Ramniwas Surjakhera
- Constituency: Narwana

Personal details
- Political party: Bharatiya Janata Party
- Profession: Politician

Krishan Kumar is an Indian politician from Haryana. He is a Member of Haryana Legislative Assembly from 2024, representing Narwana Assembly constituency as a Member of the Bharatiya Janata Party. He is also a member of the Haryana cabinet.

== See also ==
- 2024 Haryana Legislative Assembly election
- Haryana Legislative Assembly
