= Leela Ram =

Indian politician

Member of the Haryana Legislative Assembly
- In office October 2019 – 2024
- Preceded by: Randeep Singh Surjewala
- Succeeded by: Aditya Surjewala
- Constituency: Kaithal
- In office 2000–2005
- Preceded by: Charan Dass
- Succeeded by: Shamsher Singh Surjewala
- Constituency: Kaithal

Personal details
- Born: 20 April 1961 (age 65) Ujjana, Kaithal, Haryana
- Party: Bharatiya Janta Party
- Spouse: Balbir Kaur
- Children: 1
- Education: Kurukshetra University (M.A. in 1985)
- Profession: Businessman, agriculturalist

Leela Ram (born 20 April 1961), also known as Leela Ram Gurjar, is an Indian politician and a member of the 14th Haryana Legislative Assembly elected from the Kaithal constituency in the 2019 Haryana Legislative Assembly election. He had also served as Member of Legislative Assembly in 10th Haryana Legislative Assembly from Kaithal.

== Personal life ==
Ram was born on 20 April 1961 to Jhandu Ram in Ujjana village of Kultaran tehsil in Kaithal district of Haryana. He is a post graduate and completed his Master of Arts in political science from Kurukshetra University in 1985. Ram is married to Balbir Kaur, with whom he has a daughter.

== Political career ==
Ram had served as Member of Legislative Assembly in Haryana Legislative Assembly from Kaithal seat as an Indian National Lok Dal candidate from 2000 to 2005. He then joined Bharatiya Janta Party in 2014.

In the 2019 Haryana Legislative Assembly election, he won from Kaithal seat as a BJP candidate, defeating two-time winner Randeep Singh Surjewala of Indian National Congress by 530 votes and got re-elected.

In the 2024 Haryana Legislative Assembly election, Ram lost the Kaithal seat to Indian National Congress' Aditya Surjewala by a margin of 8,124 votes.
