= Dichaon Kalan =

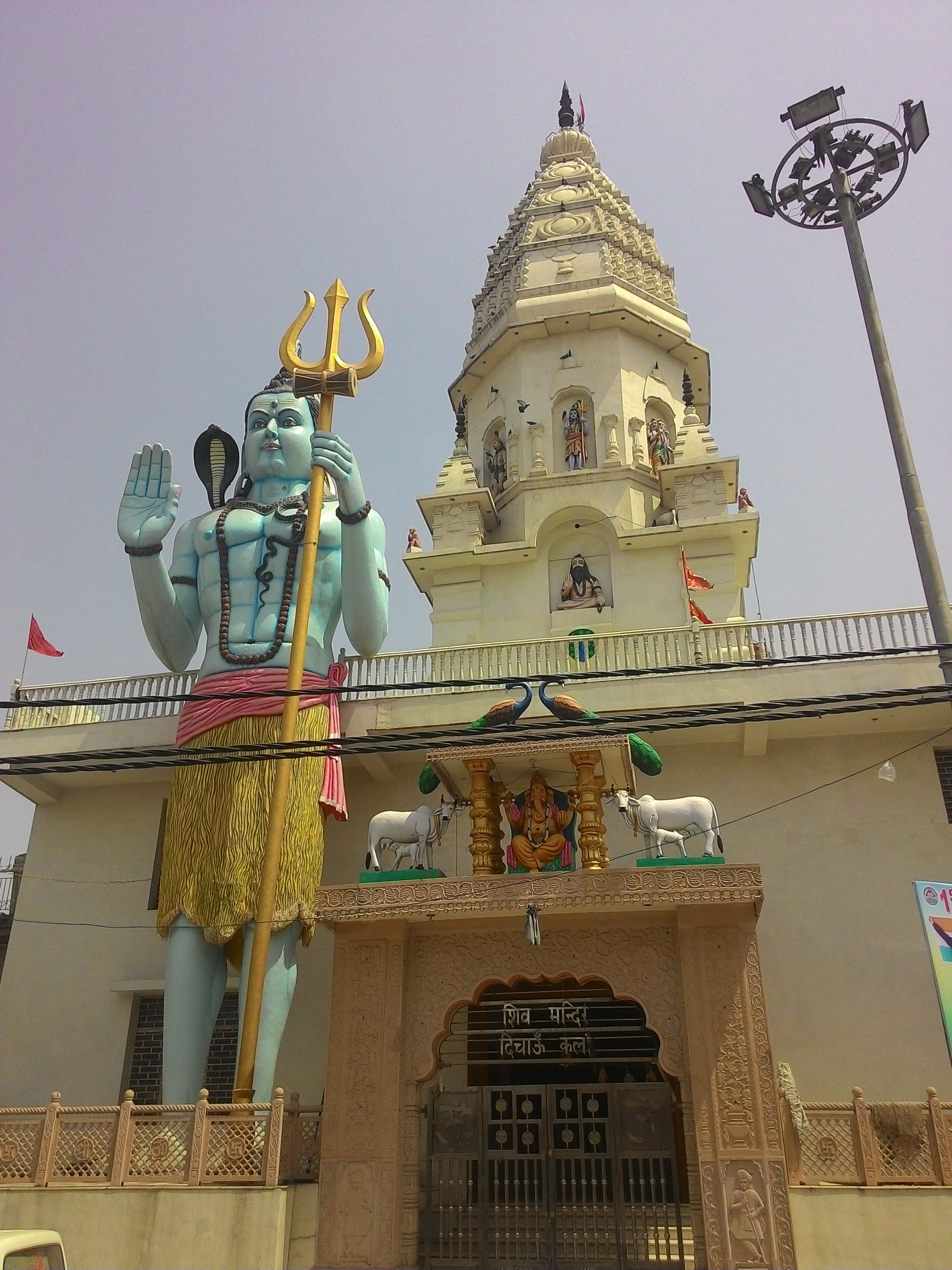
- Maha Shiv Mandir in Dichaon Kalan

- Location in Delhi Dichaon Kalan (India)
- Coordinates: 28°38′29″N 76°59′5″E
- Country: India
- State: Delhi
- District: South West Delhi
- Tehsil: Najafgarh
- Elevation: 217 m (712 ft)
- Time zone: UTC+5:30 (IST)
- PIN: 110043
- Census code: 482193

Dichaon Kalan is a city in Delhi, India, founded in the 13th century. It is located in the Najafgarh tehsil of the South West Delhi district. Dichaon Khurd (see Khurd and Kalan) is located nearby. The population speak Haryanvi.

== History ==
The village is declared a model Village. The old timers relate this with its so called real name- Dev Uvach which means, from the mouth of Gods. The village has been in the news due to its musclemen. It looks like a prosperous village as the presence of the neo-riches is dominant. Further, the Delhi Development Authority (DDA) and other agencies have been involved in taking up a number of projects around this village.

Starting in 1992, Dichaon Kalan and its neighbouring village Mitraon (or Mitraun) became a battleground for criminal gangs operating out of Delhi.

Dichaon Kalan is the stronghold of Krishan Pehlawan gang, while Mitraun was the stronghold of its rival Anup-Balraj gang. Annop and Balraj were sons of Surat Kane, a well-known gangster of the 1990s. When Kane tried to grab a piece of land from the local landlord Balwan Fauji, the latter hired Krishan Pahalwan to fight with Kane's gang. Balraj and Krishan were once friends, but a property dispute led to a bitter conflict between the two, in which a number of people lost their lives. The roots of the conflict go to 1992, when Krishan Pahalwan of Dichaon Kalan and Anoop-Balraj gang of Mitraon fought over a civic contract. After committing a murder to avenge the killing of his uncle Rohtash, Pahalwan was arrested in 1992, but released five years later. During his stay in the prison, he formed a criminal gang.

As property rates in the NCR region rose, criminals from both the villages entered into the business of property dealing and tender grabbing. Pahalwan became close to Indian National Lok Dal (INLD), the ruling party in the neighbouring state of Haryana. Between 1996 and 1998, when a prohibition was in effect in Haryana, Pahalwan's bootlegging business made him rich and powerful. Subsequently, Pahalwan started eliminating his rivals. Pahalwan's gang killed Balraj in 1998. Pahalwan was arrested that year, but released. Balraj's brother Anoop tried to reach a compromise with Pahalwan's gang, but was unsuccessful. He then started killing Pahalwan's men, and Pahalwan fled to Australia. In September 1999, Anoop's gang shot dead Pahalwan's 22-year-old brother Kuldeep. In retaliation, Anoop's 19-year old nephew Yash Pal was killed by Pahalwan's gang on the same day. Pahalwan returned to India in 2003, and was arrested by the Delhi police before being released. Anoop's henchmen made several attempts to kill him. In 2004, Pahalwan's gang killed Anoop and two police officers as Anoop was being brought to a Rohtak court. Subsequently, most of the other members of the Anoop-Balraj gang were also killed.

Krishan Pahalwan then entered politics. In 2007, his brother Bharat Singh won the municipal polls from the Dichaon Kalan ward, and became a councillor, defeating Sukhchain Singh of BJP. In 2008, Bharat Singh was elected as an INLD MLA to the Delhi Legislative Assembly. Pahalwan then filled the seat vacated by his brother; his wife Neelam was also elected a councillor. Pahalwan was arrested again in 2009; by this time, he had 27 murder cases against him.

== Demographics ==
According to the 2011 Census of India, Dichaon Kalan has a population of 27,255, including 14,553 males and 12,702 females. The village has 5172 households. The literacy rate of the village is 92.48%.

Dichaon Kalan is a Hindu-dominated village. Scheduled caste people comprise 14.37% of the village's total population.

== Economy ==
Some of villagers are property dealers. 75% of the population of this village is involved in farming. They dedicate 9 to 10 months of a year to produce various cultivars of cauliflower like Madhuri, Aganya etc. to fulfill almost 95% of the consumption of this vegetable in the city.

For more than 60 years the village sends fleets of trucks loaded with cauliflower everyday to the wholesale markets or mandis. This village grows 98% of total cauliflower in Delhi. This has earned the village the name "Gobhi Wala Gaon" (India's cauliflower village).

== Important places and service providers ==
- Maha Shiv Mandir (Shivalaya), Hanuman Mandir, Panchayat Ghar, Bichli Chaupal
- Netaji Subhash Chandra Bose Chaupal
- Govt. Co-Ed Sarvodaya Vidyalaya D.K.
- Government Boys Senior Secondary School
- Government Girls Senior Secondary School
- MLA Bharat Singh house (home office)
- Two Parks for children, one cricket ground, and two other small parks
- Government Veterinary (cow & buffalo) Hospital, One Private Chemist Shop near Shiv Manidr
- Nand Vatika, Chipiya Aali, DTC Dichaon Kalan Depot
- Punjab National Bank along with PNB ATM outside on the main road
- Valmiki Mandir and Chaupal in Valmiki Mohalla.
- Johad (Village Pond)
