= Pirthi Singh =

Indian politician

Pirthi Singh Numberdar is an Indian politician. He was elected to the Haryana Legislative Assembly from Narwana, Haryana in the 2009 and 2014 as a member of the Indian National Lok Dal.

He was one of the four MLA who joined the Dushyant Chautala's Jannayak Janta Party after a split in Indian National Lok Dal.
