= Devender Attri =

Indian politician

Member of Haryana Legislative Assembly
- Incumbent
- Assumed office 8 October 2024
- Preceded by: Dushyant Chautala
- Constituency: Uchana

Personal details
- Political party: Bharatiya Janata Party
- Profession: Politician

Devender Chatar Bhuj Attri is an Indian politician from Haryana. He is a Member of the Haryana Legislative Assembly from 2024, representing Uchana Kalan Assembly constituency as a Member of the Bharatiya Janata Party.

== See also ==
- 2024 Haryana Legislative Assembly election
- Haryana Legislative Assembly
