= Om Parkash Yadav =

Indian politician

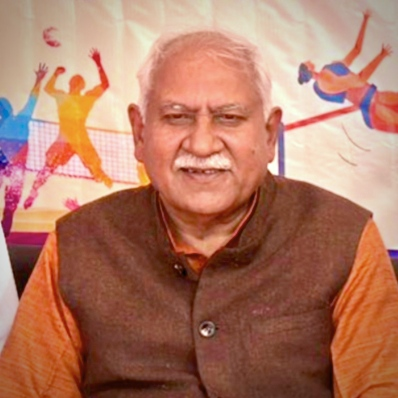
- This photo is Om Prakash Yadav's, MLA from Narnaul, Haryana.

Member of Haryana Legislative Assembly
- Incumbent
- Assumed office 2014
- Preceded by: Rao Narender Singh
- Constituency: Narnaul

Personal details
- Party: Bhartiya Janata Party
- Profession: Politician

Om Parkash Yadav is a member of the Haryana Legislative Assembly from the BJP representing the Narnaul Vidhan sabha Constituency in Haryana. He won 2019 Haryana Legislative Assembly election from BJP seat of Narnaul.
