= Ramniwas Surjakhera =

Indian politician

Ram Niwas Surjakhera is an Indian politician. He was elected to the Haryana Legislative Assembly from Narwana in the 2019 Haryana Legislative Assembly election as a member of the Jannayak Janta Party.
