= Narwana Assembly constituency =

Legislative Assembly constituency in Haryana State, India

Coordinates: 29.59°N 76.12°E

Narwana
- Constituency No. 38 for the Haryana Legislative Assembly

Constituency details
- Country: India
- Region: North India
- State: Haryana
- District: Jind
- Lok Sabha constituency: Sirsa
- Total electors: 2,24,251
- Reservation: SC

Member of Legislative Assembly
- 15th Haryana Legislative Assembly
- Incumbent Krishan Kumar
- Party: BJP

Narwana is one of the 90 Legislative Assembly constituencies of Haryana state in India.

It is part of Jind district and is reserved for candidates belonging to the Scheduled Castes. It was made SC seat in 2009.

== Members of the Legislative Assembly ==
Year	Member	Party
1967	Shamsher Singh Surjewala	Republican Party of India
1968	Neki Ram Sheokand	Indian National Congress
1972	Gauri Shankar	Indian National Congress
1977	Shamsher Singh Surjewala	Indian National Congress
1982	Shamsher Singh Surjewala	Indian National Congress
1987	Tek Chand Nain	Lokdal
1991	Shamsher Singh Surjewala	Indian National Congress
1993^	Om Prakash Chautala	Janata Party
1996	Randeep Surjewala	Indian National Congress
2000	Om Prakash Chautala	Indian National Lok Dal
2005	Randeep Surjewala	Indian National Congress
2009	Pirthi Singh	Indian National Lok Dal
2014	Pirthi Singh	Indian National Lok Dal
2019	Ramniwas Surjakhera	Jannayak Janta Party
2024	Krishan Kumar	Bharatiya Janata Party

== Election results ==
=== Assembly Election 2024 ===
2024 Haryana Legislative Assembly election: Narwana
Party	Candidate	Votes	%	±%
BJP	Krishan Kumar	59,474	37.22%	▲5.33
INC	Satbir Dablain	47,975	30.02%	▲20.86
INLD	Vidya Rani Danoda	46,303	28.97%	▲26.80
AAP	Anil Ranga	2,374	1.49%	New
JJP	Santosh Danoda	1,547	0.97%	▼50.94
NOTA	None of the Above	460	0.29%	▼0.14
Margin of victory		11,499	7.20%	▼12.82
Turnout		1,59,810	71.21%	▼1.88
Registered electors		2,24,251		▲7.00
BJP gain from JJP		Swing	▼14.69	

=== Assembly Election 2019 ===
2019 Haryana Legislative Assembly election: Narwana
Party	Candidate	Votes	%	±%
JJP	Ram Niwas	79,578	51.91%	new
BJP	Santosh Rani	48,886	31.89%	▼9.39
INC	Vidya Rani	14,045	9.16%	▲2.7
INLD	Sushil Kumar	3,334	2.17%	▼45.1
BSP	Dharmvir	2,473	1.61%	▲0.71
LSP	Vakeel Rashila	1,388	0.91%	
Independent	Suresh	916	0.60%	
Margin of victory		30,692	20.02%	▲14.02
Turnout		1,53,312	73.09%	▼8.81
Registered electors		2,09,756		▲12.54
JJP gain from INLD		Swing	▲4.63	

=== Assembly Election 2014 ===
2014 Haryana Legislative Assembly election: Narwana
Party	Candidate	Votes	%	±%
INLD	Pirthi Singh	72,166	47.28%	▼5.04
BJP	Santosh Rani	63,014	41.28%	▲38.79
INC	Vidya Rani	9,869	6.47%	▼28.9
BSP	Vikramjeet	1,374	0.90%	▼4.27
NOTA	None of the Above	1,108	0.73%	
CPI	Mani Ram	1,011	0.66%	▼0.29
Independent	Dharambir	847	0.55%	
Margin of victory		9,152	6.00%	▼10.95
Turnout		1,52,650	81.90%	▲5.74
Registered electors		1,86,391		▲16.56
INLD hold		Swing	▼5.04	

=== Assembly Election 2009 ===
2009 Haryana Legislative Assembly election: Narwana
Party	Candidate	Votes	%	±%
INLD	Pirthi Singh	63,703	52.31%	▲5.07
INC	Ramphal lot	43,063	35.36%	▼13.61
BSP	Ram Bhaj	6,294	5.17%	▲4.57
HJC(BL)	Dharam Paul Toor	3,176	2.61%	
BJP	Bhagwati Parsad	3,033	2.49%	▲1.48
CPI	Sat Pal Sarowa	1,162	0.95%	
Margin of victory		20,640	16.95%	▲15.23
Turnout		1,21,776	76.16%	▼11.30
Registered electors		1,59,904		▲29.67
INLD gain from INC		Swing	▲3.34	

=== Assembly Election 2005 ===
2005 Haryana Legislative Assembly election: Narwana
Party	Candidate	Votes	%	±%
INC	Randeep Surjewala	52,813	48.97%	▲3.35
INLD	Om Prakash Chautala	50,954	47.24%	▼0.89
BJP	Sita Ram	1,086	1.01%	
Independent	Hoshiar Singh	873	0.81%	
BSP	Birbal Dass	642	0.60%	▼2.47
Independent	Surender	547	0.51%	
Margin of victory		1,859	1.72%	▼0.80
Turnout		1,07,851	87.46%	▲10.11
Registered electors		1,23,315		▲9.53
INC gain from INLD		Swing	▲0.83	

=== Assembly Election 2000 ===
2000 Haryana Legislative Assembly election: Narwana
Party	Candidate	Votes	%	±%
INLD	Om Prakash Chautala	41,923	48.14%	
INC	Randeep Singh Surjewala	39,729	45.62%	▲12.99
BSP	Raj Kumar	2,671	3.07%	▲1.56
HVP	Bharat Singh	1,274	1.46%	▼30.19
CPI	Pawan Kumar	1,088	1.25%	
Margin of victory		2,194	2.52%	▲1.54
Turnout		87,088	78.00%	▼1.18
Registered electors		1,12,586		▲1.99
INLD gain from INC		Swing	▲15.51	

=== Assembly Election 1996 ===
1996 Haryana Legislative Assembly election: Narwana
Party	Candidate	Votes	%	±%
INC	Randeep Singh	28,286	32.63%	
HVP	Jai Parkash	27,437	31.65%	
SAP	Om Prakash Chautala S/O Devi Lal	25,783	29.74%	
BSP	Om Parkash S/O Kapur Chand	1,310	1.51%	
Independent	Ashok	694	0.80%	
Independent	Sube Singh	439	0.51%	
Margin of victory		849	0.98%	
Turnout		86,687	81.04%	
Registered electors		1,10,384		
INC gain from JP		Swing		

=== Assembly By-election 1993 ===
1993 Haryana Legislative Assembly by-election: Narwana
Party	Candidate	Votes	%	±%
JP	Om Parkash	47,297		
INC	Randeep Singh	28,342		
Margin of victory		18,955		
JP gain from INC		Swing		

=== Assembly Election 1991 ===
1991 Haryana Legislative Assembly election: Narwana
Party	Candidate	Votes	%	±%
INC	Shamsher Singh S/O Ganga Singh	23,445	34.39%	▲5.08
HVP	Gauri Shanker	16,284	23.89%	
JP	Tek Chand S/O Risala	15,609	22.90%	
Independent	Tek Chand S/O Amilal	4,001	5.87%	
Independent	Balwant S/O Ram Sarup	3,019	4.43%	
Independent	Birbal Dass	1,880	2.76%	
BJP	Ranbir Kaur	1,548	2.27%	
Independent	Yogendra Pal	332	0.49%	
Margin of victory		7,161	10.50%	▼28.53
Turnout		68,176	73.60%	▼7.00
Registered electors		96,313		▲5.05
INC gain from LKD		Swing	▼33.96	

=== Assembly Election 1987 ===
1987 Haryana Legislative Assembly election: Narwana
Party	Candidate	Votes	%	±%
LKD	Tek Chand	48,741	68.35%	▲36.22
INC	Shamsher Singh	20,902	29.31%	▼12.24
Independent	Dilbag	565	0.79%	
Margin of victory		27,839	39.04%	▲29.61
Turnout		71,312	78.74%	▼2.06
Registered electors		91,682		▲18.49
LKD gain from INC		Swing		

=== Assembly Election 1982 ===
1982 Haryana Legislative Assembly election: Narwana
Party	Candidate	Votes	%	±%
INC	Shamsher Singh	25,672	41.55%	▲19.5
LKD	Tek Chand	19,848	32.13%	
Independent	Gori Shankar	12,620	20.43%	
CPI	Om Parkash	1,930	3.12%	▼0.5
Independent	Ranbir Kaur	509	0.82%	
Independent	Jhanda	399	0.65%	
Margin of victory		5,824	9.43%	▲7.40
Turnout		61,780	81.58%	▲9.45
Registered electors		77,375		▲32.32
INC hold		Swing	▲19.50	

=== Assembly Election 1977 ===
1977 Haryana Legislative Assembly election: Narwana
Party	Candidate	Votes	%	±%
INC	Shamsher Singh	9,078	22.05%	▼0.88
Independent	Tek Chand	8,242	20.02%	
JP	Jatender Kumar	6,652	16.16%	
Independent	Kali Ram Vakil	6,602	16.04%	
Independent	Kaliram Dairywala	5,228	12.70%	
Independent	Ram Gopal	2,504	6.08%	
CPI	Om Parkash	1,493	3.63%	▼0.44
Independent	Kapur Chand	554	1.35%	
Independent	Ram Lal	313	0.76%	
Independent	Pawan Kumar	235	0.57%	
Margin of victory		836	2.03%	▼1.59
Turnout		41,165	71.46%	▼7.98
Registered electors		58,475		▼5.20
INC gain from INC(O)		Swing	▼14.11	

=== Assembly Election 1972 ===
1972 Haryana Legislative Assembly election: Narwana
Party	Candidate	Votes	%	±%
INC(O)	Gauri Shankar	17,482	36.16%	
Akhil Bhartiya Arya Sabha	Tek Chand	15,733	32.54%	
INC	Brinder Singh	11,086	22.93%	▼27.99
CPI	Surender Nath	1,967	4.07%	
Independent	Maman Chand	1,139	2.36%	
RPI	Ratti Ram	603	1.25%	
Independent	Nanu Mal	333	0.69%	
Margin of victory		1,749	3.62%	▼13.94
Turnout		48,343	79.92%	▲15.44
Registered electors		61,683		▲10.83
INC(O) gain from INC		Swing	▼14.76	

=== Assembly Election 1968 ===
1968 Haryana Legislative Assembly election: Narwana
Party	Candidate	Votes	%	±%
INC	Neki Ram	17,833	50.92%	▲4.82
SWA	Shamsher Singh	11,685	33.36%	
SSP	Sewa Singh	4,293	12.26%	
Independent	Narayan Datt	640	1.83%	
Independent	Sharda Kumari	259	0.74%	
Independent	Nannu Mal	202	0.58%	
Independent	Nathu Ram	110	0.31%	
Margin of victory		6,148	17.55%	▲13.98
Turnout		35,022	64.31%	▼14.32
Registered electors		55,653		▲1.07
INC gain from RPI		Swing	▲1.25	

=== Assembly Election 1967 ===
1967 Haryana Legislative Assembly election: Narwana
Party	Candidate	Votes	%	±%
RPI	S. Singh	21,130	49.67%	
INC	K. Ram	19,611	46.10%	
Independent	N. Mal	1,797	4.22%	
Margin of victory		1,519	3.57%	
Turnout		42,538	80.95%	
Registered electors		55,063		
RPI win (new seat)				

== See also ==
- List of constituencies of the Haryana Legislative Assembly
- Jind district
