= Ram Kishan Gupta =

Indian politician

Member of Parliament, Lok Sabha
- In office 1967–1971
- Preceded by: Mani Ram Bagri
- Succeeded by: Mani Ram Godara
- Constituency: Hisar

Personal details
- Born: April 27, 1918
- Party: Indian National Congress
- Spouse: Basant Kaur

Ram Kishan Gupta is an Indian politician. He was elected to the Lok Sabha, lower house of the Parliament of India as a member of the Indian National Congress.
