= Premlata Singh =

Indian politician

Member of Haryana Legislative Assembly
- In office 2014–2019
- Preceded by: Om Prakash Chautala
- Succeeded by: Dushyant Chautala
- Constituency: Uchana Kalan

Personal details
- Born: 15 January 1950 (age 76)
- Party: Indian National Congress (2024–present)
- Other political affiliations: Bharatiya Janata Party (2014–2024)
- Spouse: Birender Singh
- Children: Brijendra Singh, Geetanjali

Premlata Singh (born 15 January 1950) is an Indian politician from Haryana. She was a member of the 13th Haryana Legislative Assembly from Bharatiya Janata Party representing the Uchana Kalan.

== Personal life ==
Premlata married Birender Singh on 9 June 1970. Birender Singh served as the Union Minister of Steel and Minister for Rural Development in the Narendra Modi led NDA Government from July 2016 to April 2019.

Her son Brijendra Singh was previously a bureaucrat who served as an IAS officer of 1998 Batch and was posted in Haryana for 21 years. He was elected as Member of Parliament from Hisar in 2019 Indian general election.

== See also ==
- Dynastic politics of Haryana
