= Narnaul Assembly constituency =

Legislative Assembly constituency in Haryana State, India

Coordinates: 28.05°N 76.11°E

Narnaul
- Constituency No. 70 for the Haryana Legislative Assembly

Constituency details
- Country: India
- Region: North India
- State: Haryana
- Division: Gurgaon
- District: Mahendragarh
- Lok Sabha constituency: Bhiwani-Mahendragarh
- Total electors: 1,57,990
- Reservation: None

Member of Legislative Assembly
- 15th Haryana Legislative Assembly
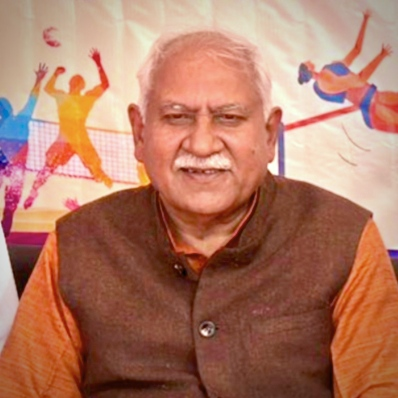
- Incumbent Om Parkash Yadav
- Party: Bharatiya Janata Party
- Elected year: 2024

Narnaul Assembly constituency is one of the 90 Legislative Assembly constituencies of Haryana state in India.

It is part of Mahendragarh district.

== Members of the Legislative Assembly ==
Year	Member	Party
1967	B. Lal	Bharatiya Jana Sangh
1968	Ram Saran Chand Mittal	Indian National Congress
1972	Ram Saran Chand Mittal	Indian National Congress
1977	Ayodhya Prashad	Janata Party
1979^	Phusa Ram	Independent
1982	Phusa Ram	Indian National Congress
1987	Kailash Chand Sharma	Bharatiya Janata Party
1991	Phusa Ram	Indian National Congress
1996	Kailash Chand Sharma	Independent
2000	Moola Ram	Independent
2005	Radhey Shyam	Independent
2009	Rao Narendra Singh	Haryana Janhit Congress
2014	Om Parkash Yadav	Bharatiya Janata Party
2019	Om Parkash Yadav	Bharatiya Janata Party
2024	Om Parkash Yadav	Bharatiya Janata Party

== Election results ==
=== Assembly Election 2024 ===
2024 Haryana Legislative Assembly election: Narnaul
Party	Candidate	Votes	%	±%
BJP	Om Parkash Yadav	57,635	54.08%	▲10.87
INC	Rao Narender Singh	40,464	37.97%	▲12.68
AAP	Ravinder Singh Matru	6,188	5.81%	New
NOTA	None of the Above	535	0.50%	▲0.05
Margin of victory		17,171	16.11%	▲1.23
Turnout		1,06,576	68.16%	▼0.49
Registered electors		1,57,990		▲8.54
BJP hold		Swing	▲10.87	

=== Assembly Election 2019 ===
2019 Haryana Legislative Assembly election: Narnaul
Party	Candidate	Votes	%	±%
BJP	Om Parkash Yadav	42,732	43.21%	▲10.42
JJP	Kamlesh Saini	28,017	28.33%	New
INC	Narender Singh	25,009	25.29%	▲10.89
SUCI(C)	Comrade Sita Ram	845	0.85%	New
BSP	Krishan Kumar	560	0.57%	▼0.16
Margin of victory		14,715	14.88%	▲10.14
Turnout		98,894	68.64%	▼6.81
Registered electors		1,44,066		▲12.58
BJP hold		Swing	▲10.42	

=== Assembly Election 2014 ===
2014 Haryana Legislative Assembly election: Narnaul
Party	Candidate	Votes	%	±%
BJP	Om Parkash Yadav	31,664	32.79%	▲24.16
INLD	Kamlesh	27,091	28.06%	▲0.64
INC	Narender Singh	13,899	14.40%	▼2.83
Independent	Suresh Kumar Saini	9,497	9.84%	New
HJC(BL)	Roshan Lal Yadav	4,698	4.87%	▼26.85
Independent	Sandeep Yadav	4,165	4.31%	New
Independent	Kishan Chaudhary	1,721	1.78%	New
Independent	Dil Raj	792	0.82%	New
BSP	Anil Kumar	698	0.72%	▼0.81
Independent	Ram Kishan	535	0.55%	New
Margin of victory		4,573	4.74%	▲0.43
Turnout		96,554	75.45%	▲3.86
Registered electors		1,27,967		▲16.18
BJP gain from HJC(BL)		Swing	▲1.08	

=== Assembly Election 2009 ===
2009 Haryana Legislative Assembly election: Narnaul
Party	Candidate	Votes	%	±%
HJC(BL)	Narender Singh	25,011	31.72%	New
INLD	Bhana Ram	21,619	27.42%	▲16.71
INC	Sanjay Yadav	13,586	17.23%	▼2.51
BJP	Kailash Chand Sharma	6,806	8.63%	▲6.23
Independent	Sarla	3,354	4.25%	New
Independent	Surender Kumar	2,164	2.74%	New
Independent	Kailash Chand Sharma	1,626	2.06%	New
Independent	Fauji Karamvir	1,256	1.59%	New
BSP	Purshotam Dass	1,209	1.53%	New
Independent	Sudhir	618	0.78%	New
Independent	Umakant	536	0.68%	New
Margin of victory		3,392	4.30%	▼0.02
Turnout		78,854	71.59%	▼0.54
Registered electors		1,10,141		▼21.93
HJC(BL) gain from Independent		Swing	▲7.66	

=== Assembly Election 2005 ===
2005 Haryana Legislative Assembly election: Narnaul
Party	Candidate	Votes	%	±%
Independent	Radhey Shyam	24,485	24.06%	New
INC	Chander Parkash	20,087	19.74%	▲15.76
SP	Bahadur Singh	15,673	15.40%	▲10.21
Independent	Kishan Chand	11,139	10.95%	New
INLD	Tej Parkash	10,900	10.71%	New
Independent	Moola Ram	8,442	8.30%	New
BJP	Prithvi Raj	2,448	2.41%	▼13.67
Independent	Diwan Singh	2,367	2.33%	New
Independent	Baldev Singh	1,366	1.34%	New
RJD	Bharat Bhushan	991	0.97%	New
Independent	Prem Devi	987	0.97%	New
Margin of victory		4,398	4.32%	▲3.72
Turnout		1,01,771	72.14%	▲15.63
Registered electors		1,41,082		▲12.28
Independent hold		Swing	▲2.24	

=== Assembly Election 2000 ===
2000 Haryana Legislative Assembly election: Narnaul
Party	Candidate	Votes	%	±%
Independent	Moola Ram	15,488	21.82%	New
Independent	Radhey Shyam	15,061	21.21%	New
Independent	Chand Nath	12,036	16.95%	New
BJP	Kailash Chand Sharma	11,411	16.07%	▼8.62
Independent	Kishan Chaudhary	6,899	9.72%	New
SP	Ram Niwas Yadav	3,688	5.19%	▲4.21
INC	Renu Poswal	2,827	3.98%	▼11.08
BSP	Raghu Yadav	1,407	1.98%	▼1.09
Independent	Shree Ram Gupta	742	1.05%	New
HVP	Dharam Pal	448	0.63%	New
Independent	Mahender Singh	364	0.51%	New
Margin of victory		427	0.60%	▼5.89
Turnout		70,993	56.55%	▼9.83
Registered electors		1,25,647		▲1.27
Independent hold		Swing	▼9.38	

=== Assembly Election 1996 ===
1996 Haryana Legislative Assembly election: Narnaul
Party	Candidate	Votes	%	±%
Independent	Kailash Chand Sharma	25,671	31.19%	New
BJP	Kailash Chand Sharma	20,325	24.70%	▲11.45
SAP	Hoshiyar Singh	15,007	18.24%	New
INC	Phusa Ram	12,393	15.06%	▼27.78
Independent	Shiv Kumar	2,968	3.61%	New
BSP	Attar Singh Dahiya	2,528	3.07%	New
SP	Udmiram	807	0.98%	New
Independent	Hariram	683	0.83%	New
JD	Thavar Singh	564	0.69%	New
Margin of victory		5,346	6.50%	▼20.11
Turnout		82,297	69.21%	▲6.32
Registered electors		1,24,075		▲8.60
Independent gain from INC		Swing	▼11.64	

=== Assembly Election 1991 ===
1991 Haryana Legislative Assembly election: Narnaul
Party	Candidate	Votes	%	±%
INC	Phusa Ram	29,366	42.83%	▲12.94
JP	Udmi Ram	11,123	16.22%	▲14.02
HVP	Hoshiar Singh	9,964	14.53%	New
BJP	Kailash Chand Sharma	9,083	13.25%	▼46.33
Independent	Ashok Kumar	2,331	3.40%	New
Independent	Satya Narain	2,200	3.21%	New
Independent	Hari Ram	2,049	2.99%	New
Sarvajati Janta Panchayat	Attar Singh	934	1.36%	New
Doordarshi Party	Dinesh Kumar	505	0.74%	New
Margin of victory		18,243	26.61%	▼3.08
Turnout		68,557	61.97%	▼8.66
Registered electors		1,14,248		▲9.65
INC gain from BJP		Swing	▼16.75	

=== Assembly Election 1987 ===
1987 Haryana Legislative Assembly election: Narnaul
Party	Candidate	Votes	%	±%
BJP	Kailash Chand Sharma	42,629	59.58%	▲27.13
INC	Phusa Ram	21,386	29.89%	▼15.63
JP	Ram Nivas	1,575	2.20%	▼0.81
VHP	Omkar Singh	1,217	1.70%	New
Independent	Rao Surat Singh	1,096	1.53%	New
Independent	Arun Kumar Yadav	1,063	1.49%	New
Independent	Rajinder	865	1.21%	New
Independent	Nar Singh	484	0.68%	New
Margin of victory		21,243	29.69%	▲16.62
Turnout		71,545	70.04%	▲4.75
Registered electors		1,04,192		▲18.10
BJP gain from INC		Swing	▲14.06	

=== Assembly Election 1982 ===
1982 Haryana Legislative Assembly election: Narnaul
Party	Candidate	Votes	%	±%
INC	Phusa Ram	25,671	45.53%	New
BJP	Kailash Chand Sharma	18,298	32.45%	New
Independent	Ramjiwan	7,078	12.55%	New
JP	Babu Nand	1,696	3.01%	New
Independent	Chhaju Ram	735	1.30%	New
Independent	Shyam Sunder	602	1.07%	New
Independent	Shri Ram	591	1.05%	New
Independent	Hardwari Lal	478	0.85%	New
Independent	Mukat Bihari	401	0.71%	New
Independent	Suresh Kumar	335	0.59%	New
Margin of victory		7,373	13.08%	
Turnout		56,387	65.13%	
Registered electors		88,225		
INC gain from Independent		Swing		

=== Assembly By-election 1979 ===
1979 Haryana Legislative Assembly by-election: Narnaul
Party	Candidate	Votes	%	±%
Independent	Phusa Ram	17,603		New
	B. Nand	16,958		New
	H.Chander	14,377		New
RPI	M. Lal	1,292		New
Independent	C.Lal	540		New
Independent	J.R.Bewal	268		New
Independent	N.Mal	262		New
Independent	R. Kishore	255		New
Margin of victory		645		
Independent gain from JP		Swing		

=== Assembly Election 1977 ===
1977 Haryana Legislative Assembly election: Narnaul
Party	Candidate	Votes	%	±%
JP	Ayodhya Prashad	20,784	44.97%	New
VHP	Attar Singh	9,375	20.29%	▼24.10
Independent	Phusa Ram	6,574	14.22%	New
INC	Nihal Singh	6,298	13.63%	▼41.98
Independent	Onkar	1,633	3.53%	New
Independent	Atam Prakash	484	1.05%	New
Independent	Dharam Pal	476	1.03%	New
Independent	Kurda	343	0.74%	New
Margin of victory		11,409	24.69%	▲13.47
Turnout		46,216	63.27%	▼3.33
Registered electors		74,495		▲26.22
JP gain from INC		Swing	▼10.64	

=== Assembly Election 1972 ===
1972 Haryana Legislative Assembly election: Narnaul
Party	Candidate	Votes	%	±%
INC	Ram Saran Chand Mittal	21,455	55.61%	▲6.9
VHP	Manoher Lal	17,126	44.39%	New
Margin of victory		4,329	11.22%	▲6.22
Turnout		38,581	67.74%	▲15.00
Registered electors		59,018		
INC hold		Swing		

=== Assembly Election 1968 ===
1968 Haryana Legislative Assembly election: Narnaul
Party	Candidate	Votes	%	±%
INC	Ram Saran Chand Mittal	12,661	48.71%	▲18.02
Independent	Dharam Paul	11,361	43.71%	New
ABJS	Banwari Lal	1,034	3.98%	▼28.45
Independent	Rajindra Kumar	934	3.59%	New
Margin of victory		1,300	5.00%	▲3.26
Turnout		25,990	52.42%	▼12.05
Registered electors		51,598		▲1.12
INC gain from ABJS		Swing	▲16.28	

=== Assembly Election 1967 ===
1967 Haryana Legislative Assembly election: Narnaul
Party	Candidate	Votes	%	±%
ABJS	B. Lal	10,330	32.43%	New
INC	Ram Saran Chand Mittal	9,776	30.69%	New
Independent	S. Mandan	5,887	18.48%	New
SSP	D. Pal	5,066	15.90%	New
Independent	C. Parkash	458	1.44%	New
Independent	H. Singh	336	1.05%	New
Margin of victory		554	1.74%	
Turnout		31,853	65.76%	
Registered electors		51,026		
ABJS win (new seat)				

== See also ==
- List of constituencies of the Haryana Legislative Assembly
- Mahendragarh district
