= Brijendra Singh (Haryana politician) =

Indian politician

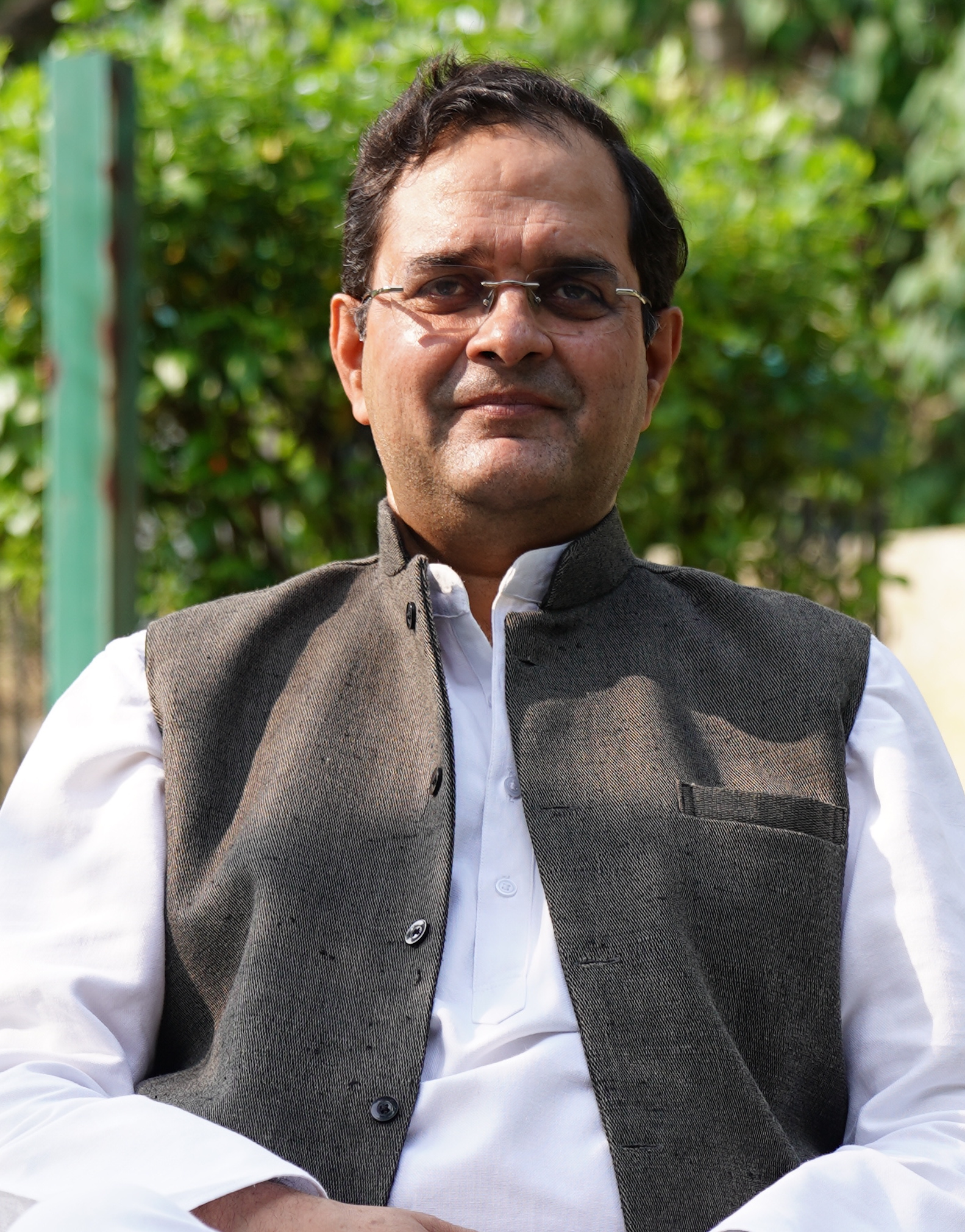
- Brijendra Singh in 2024

Member of Parliament, Lok Sabha
- In office 23 May 2019 – 4 June 2024
- Preceded by: Dushyant Chautala
- Succeeded by: Jai Parkash
- Constituency: Hisar

Personal details
- Born: 13 May 1972 (age 54) Rohtak, Haryana, India
- Party: Indian National Congress (2024- Present)
- Other political affiliations: Bhartiya Janta Party (till 2024)
- Parents: Birender Singh (father); Premlata Singh (mother)

Brijendra Singh (born 13 May 1972) is an Indian politician and former Member of Parliament from Hisar parliamentary constituency. He is a member of the Indian National Congress. He is a former Indian Administrative Service officer of the Haryana cadre from the batch of 1998.

== Political career ==
Singh contested the 2019 Indian General Election from Hisar as a Bharatiya Janata Party (BJP) candidate and was elected to the 17th Lok Sabha. He secured 51.1% of the vote share and won by a margin of 3,14,068 votes.

As a Member of Parliament, he was a Member of the Public Accounts Committee (India), Standing Committee on Defence (India), Consultative Committee, Ministry of Youth Affairs and Sports, Committee on Rules, Committee on Petitions, the Joint Committee on the Biological Diversity (Amendment) Bill, 2021, and the Joint Committee on the Multi-State Co-operative Societies (Amendment) Bill.

He was among the few members of the BJP who extended support to the Indian wrestlers' protest in 2023, while serving as Member of Parliament.

He resigned from the primary membership of the BJP on 10 March 2024 citing 'compelling political reasons' and joined the Congress party. He contested the 2024 Haryana Legislative Assembly election from Uchana Kalan constituency, and lost by a margin of 32 votes.

He was appointed as the Vice-Chairman of the Foreign Affairs Department of the All India Congress Committee in August 2025.

On 5 October 2025, he began a state-wide padayatra in Haryana, Sadbhav Yatra. He described the aims of the Yatra as strengthening brotherhood, raising awareness about state and national issues, and unifying Congress workers and leaders. Sadbhav Yatra is inspired by Rahul Gandhi's Bharat Jodo Yatra.

== Education ==
Singh was educated at Modern School, Barakhamba Road. He completed his BA (Honours) History from St. Stephen's College, Delhi in 1992. He went on to pursue MA in Modern History from Jawaharlal Nehru University. He also holds an MSc in Public Policy and Management from King's College London.

== Personal life ==
Singh's native village is Dumerkha Kalan near Uchana in Jind district, Haryana. He is from the Jat community. He is the son of former Union Minister Birender Singh. His great-grandfather, Sir Chhotu Ram, was an iconic peasant leader in pre-Partition Punjab. Singh's mother, Premlata Singh, was a Member of the Legislative Assembly in Haryana representing Uchana Kalan constituency, which was previously held by his father.

He married Jasmeet Sial in 1999. They have two children.

== Administrative career ==
Singh held All India Rank 9 in the Civil Services Examination in the batch of 1998. He took voluntary retirement from the Indian Administrative Service after serving in Haryana for 21 years.

During his career, he served as the Deputy Commissioner of Faridabad and Chandigarh. Before retiring from service, his last posting was Managing Director of Haryana State Co-operative Supply and Marketing Federation Limited (HAFED), the apex co-operative federation in Haryana.
