= Uchana Kalan Assembly constituency =

Coordinates: 29.47°N 76.17°E

Uchana Kalan
- Constituency No. 37 for the Haryana Legislative Assembly

Constituency details
- Country: India
- Region: North India
- State: Haryana
- District: Jind district
- Total electors: 2,18,373
- Reservation: None

Member of Legislative Assembly
- 15th Haryana Legislative Assembly
- Incumbent Devender Attri
- Party: Bharatiya Janata Party
- Elected year: 2024

Uchana Kalan Assembly constituency in Jind district is one of the 90 Vidhan Sabha constituencies of Haryana state in northern India.

It is part of Hisar Lok Sabha constituency. Total vote in uchana 217800

== Members of the Legislative Assembly ==
Year	Member	Party
1977	Chaudhary Birender Singh	Indian National Congress
1982	Chaudhary Birender Singh	Indian National Congress
1985^	Sube Singh Punia	Indian National Congress
1987	Ch. Desh Raj Numberdar	Lokdal
1991	Virendar Singh	Indian National Congress
1996	Chaudhary Birender Singh	All India Indira Congress
2000	Bhag Singh Bhaker	Indian National Lok Dal
2005	Chaudhary Birender Singh	Indian National Congress
2009	Om Prakash Chautala	Indian National Lok Dal
2014	Premlata Singh	Bharatiya Janata Party
2019	Dushyant Chautala	Jannayak Janta Party
2024	Devender Attri	Bharatiya Janata Party

^By poll

== Election results ==
=== Assembly Election 2024 ===
2024 Haryana Legislative Assembly election: Uchana Kalan
Party	Candidate	Votes	%	±%
BJP	Devender Attri	48,968	29.50	▲1.06
INC	Brijendra Singh	48,936	29.48	▲26.34
Independent	Virender Ghogharian	31,456	18.95	New
Independent	Vikas	13,458	8.11	New
JJP	Dushyant Chautala	7,950	4.79	▼53.61
Independent	Dilbag Sandil	7,373	4.44	New
INLD	Vinod Pal Singh Dulganch	2,653	1.60	▲1.11
NOTA	None of the Above	187	0.11	New
Margin of victory		32	0.02	▼29.94
Turnout		1,66,006	75.97	▼0.74
Registered electors		2,18,373		▲5.81
BJP gain from JJP		Swing	▼28.90	

=== Assembly Election 2019 ===
2019 Haryana Legislative Assembly election: Uchana Kalan
Party	Candidate	Votes	%	±%
JJP	Dushyant Chautala	92,504	58.39	New
BJP	Premlata Singh	45,052	28.44	▼20.7
BSP	Samarjit	6,264	3.95	▲2.03
Independent	Raghvir	5,705	3.60	
INC	Bal Ram	4,972	3.14	▲2
AAP	Rohtash	1,101	0.70	
Margin of victory		47,452	29.95	▲25.34
Turnout		1,58,413	76.71	▼8.41
Registered electors		2,06,514		▲8.43
JJP gain from BJP		Swing	▲9.25	

=== Assembly Election 2014 ===
2014 Haryana Legislative Assembly election: Uchana Kalan
Party	Candidate	Votes	%	±%
BJP	Premlata Singh	79,674	49.14	▲48.01
INLD	Dushyant Chautala	72,194	44.53	▼2.25
BSP	Randheer	3,112	1.92	▼0.12
INC	Bhag Singh	1,838	1.13	▼45.18
HJC(BL)	Bijender Kumar	974	0.60	▼0.39
Margin of victory		7,480	4.61	▲4.15
Turnout		1,62,125	85.12	▲2.10
Registered electors		1,90,466		▲18.04
BJP gain from INLD		Swing	▲2.36	

=== Assembly Election 2009 ===
2009 Haryana Legislative Assembly election: Uchana Kalan
Party	Candidate	Votes	%	±%
INLD	Om Prakash Chautala	62,669	46.78	▲12.71
INC	Birender Singh	62,048	46.32	▼0.34
BSP	Sushil Kumar	2,737	2.04	▲0.7
BJP	Balkar Singh	1,525	1.14	▼14.19
HJC(BL)	Bal Mukand Sharma	1,323	0.99	
Independent	Suresh Kumar	1,282	0.96	
Margin of victory		621	0.46	▼12.12
Turnout		1,33,959	83.02	▲3.59
Registered electors		1,61,358		▲25.65
INLD gain from INC		Swing	▲0.13	

=== Assembly Election 2005 ===
2005 Haryana Legislative Assembly election: Uchana Kalan
Party	Candidate	Votes	%	±%
INC	Birender Singh	47,590	46.66	▲9.54
INLD	Desh Raj	34,758	34.08	▼10.91
BJP	Om Parkash	15,635	15.33	
Independent	Meena	1,398	1.37	
BSP	Balmat	1,372	1.35	▼2.25
JD(S)	Ishwar Singh	987	0.97	
Margin of victory		12,832	12.58	▲4.72
Turnout		1,02,003	79.43	▲2.37
Registered electors		1,28,418		▲12.08
INC gain from INLD		Swing	▲1.67	

=== Assembly Election 2000 ===
2000 Haryana Legislative Assembly election: Uchana Kalan
Party	Candidate	Votes	%	±%
INLD	Bhag Singh	39,715	44.98	
INC	Birender Singh	32,773	37.12	▲14.07
HVP	Om Parkash	12,545	14.21	▲0.16
BSP	Balwan Singh	3,172	3.59	▼3.85
Margin of victory		6,942	7.86	▲2.79
Turnout		88,293	77.81	▲8.81
Registered electors		1,14,573		▲1.30
INLD gain from AIIC(T)		Swing	▲16.80	

=== Assembly Election 1996 ===
1996 Haryana Legislative Assembly election: Uchana Kalan
Party	Candidate	Votes	%	±%
AIIC(T)	Birender Singh	21,755	28.18	
SAP	Bhag Singh	17,843	23.11	
INC	Desh Raj	17,794	23.05	▼22.16
HVP	Jagphool Singh	10,841	14.04	▲0.27
BSP	Roshani	5,743	7.44	
Independent	Prem Singh	1,040	1.35	
Independent	Rajinder Singh Chahal	503	0.65	
Independent	Dariya	411	0.53	
Margin of victory		3,912	5.07	▼7.45
Turnout		77,196	71.78	▼0.78
Registered electors		1,13,108		▲10.52
AIIC(T) gain from INC		Swing	▼17.03	

=== Assembly Election 1991 ===
1991 Haryana Legislative Assembly election: Uchana Kalan
Party	Candidate	Votes	%	±%
INC	Virendar Singh	31,937	45.21	▲31.04
JP	Desh Raj	23,093	32.69	
HVP	Bhalle Ram	9,728	13.77	
Independent	Dhup Singh	2,412	3.41	
BJP	Sat Narain	1,545	2.19	
Independent	Jile Singh	454	0.64	
Independent	Om Parkash S/O Gopala	366	0.52	
Margin of victory		8,844	12.52	▼50.85
Turnout		70,646	71.48	▼6.20
Registered electors		1,02,339		▲7.84
INC gain from LKD		Swing	▼32.33	

=== Assembly Election 1987 ===
1987 Haryana Legislative Assembly election: Uchana Kalan
Party	Candidate	Votes	%	±%
LKD	Desh Raj	55,361	77.54	
INC	Sube Singh	10,113	14.16	
Independent	Ram Chander	4,653	6.52	
Independent	Deva Singh	490	0.69	
Independent	Dilbag Singh	317	0.44	
Independent	Chander Pal	286	0.40	
Margin of victory		45,248	63.37	
Turnout		71,400	76.15	
Registered electors		94,902		
LKD gain from INC		Swing		

=== Assembly By-election 1985 ===
1985 Haryana Legislative Assembly by-election: Uchana Kalan
Party	Candidate	Votes	%	±%
INC	S. Singh	34,375		
LKD	I. Singh	24,904		
Independent	H. Ram	553		
Independent	D. Singh	456		
Independent	Pohloo	283		
Independent	D. Singh	219		
Independent	Lakhmi	129		
Independent	H. S. Nain	101		
Independent	R. K. Balmiki	71		
Independent	S. Pal	71		
Margin of victory		9,471		
INC hold		Swing		

=== Assembly Election 1982 ===
1982 Haryana Legislative Assembly election: Uchana Kalan
Party	Candidate	Votes	%	±%
INC	Birender Singh	30,031	50.26	▲23.94
Independent	Desh Raj	20,225	33.85	
LKD	Surenderpal Singh	7,037	11.78	
Independent	Om Parkash	1,210	2.02	
Independent	Ram Phal	616	1.03	
Independent	Sube Singh	359	0.60	
Margin of victory		9,806	16.41	▲12.87
Turnout		59,755	75.34	▲3.49
Registered electors		80,559		▲23.62
INC hold		Swing	▲23.94	

=== Assembly Election 1977 ===
1977 Haryana Legislative Assembly election: Uchana Kalan
Party	Candidate	Votes	%	±%
INC	Birender Singh	12,120	26.31	
JP	Ranbir Singh	10,488	22.77	
Independent	Jagroop Singh	8,784	19.07	
Independent	Desh Raj	8,647	18.77	
Independent	Satya Pal	3,316	7.20	
Independent	Ram Krishan	1,094	2.38	
Independent	Ram Richhpal	1,092	2.37	
Independent	Shamsher Singh	430	0.93	
Margin of victory		1,632	3.54	
Turnout		46,061	71.55	
Registered electors		65,166		
INC win (new seat)				

== See also ==
- Haryana Legislative Assembly
- Elections in Haryana
- Elections in India
- Lok Sabha
- Rajya Sabha
- Election Commission of India
