= Rao Narendra Singh =

Indian politician

President Haryana Pradesh Congress Committee
- Incumbent
- Assumed office 29 September 2025
- Preceded by: Udai Bhan

Member of Legislative Assembly
- In office 2009 - 2014
- Constituency: Narnaul

Personal details
- Party: Indian National Congress
- Children: 2
- As of 28 November, 2009

Rao Narendra Singh is an Indian politician from the state of Haryana, India. He served as the Minister of Health in the Government of Haryana from 2009 to 2014. He was elected from the Narnaul Assembly constituency as a candidate of the Haryana Janhit Congress in 2009. He later joined the Indian National Congress, and was subsequently inducted into the state cabinet by the Chief Minister.

He was apponited as the president of Haryana Pradesh Congress Committee on 29 September 2025.
