= Kaithal Assembly constituency =

Constituency of the Haryana legislative assembly in India

Coordinates: 29.80°N 76.41°E

- Constituency No. 17 for the Haryana Legislative Assembly

Constituency details
- Country: India
- Region: North India
- State: Haryana
- Lok Sabha constituency: Kurukshetra
- Established: 1967
- Total electors: 2,21,883
- Reservation: None

Member of Legislative Assembly
- 15th Haryana Legislative Assembly
- Incumbent Aditya Surjewala
- Party: Indian National Congress
- Elected year: 2024

Kaithal Assembly constituency is one of the 90 constituencies in the Haryana Legislative Assembly of Haryana a northern state of India. Kaithal is also part of Kurukshetra Lok Sabha constituency.

== Members of the Legislative Assembly ==
Year	Member	Party
1967	Om Prabha Jain	Indian National Congress
1968	Om Prabha Jain	Indian National Congress
1972	Charan Dass	Independent
1977	Raghunath	Janata Party
1982	Roshan Lal	Independent
1987	Surender Kumar	Lokdal
1991	Surender Kumar	Indian National Congress
1996	Charan Dass	Samata Party
2000	Leela Ram Gujjar	Indian National Lok Dal
2005	Ch. Shamsher Surjewala	Indian National Congress
2009	Randeep Singh Surjewala	Indian National Congress
2014	Randeep Singh Surjewala	Indian National Congress
2019	Leela Ram Gujjar	Bharatiya Janata Party
2024	Aditya Surjewala	Indian National Congress

== Election results ==
=== Assembly Election 2024 ===
2024 Haryana Legislative Assembly election: Kaithal
Party	Candidate	Votes	%	±%
INC	Aditya Surjewala	83,744	49.64	▲4.63
BJP	Leela Ram	75,620	44.82	▼0.97
BSP	Anil Tanwer	3,428	2.03	▲0.64
JJP	Sandeep Garhi	1,910	1.13	▼2.87
AAP	Satbir Singh Goyat	1,749	1.04	New
NOTA	None of the Above	514	0.30	New
Margin of victory		8,124	4.82	▲4.03
Turnout		1,68,714	75.69	▼2.38
Registered electors		2,21,883		▲9.65
INC gain from BJP		Swing	▲3.85	

=== Assembly Election 2019 ===
2019 Haryana Legislative Assembly election: Kaithal
Party	Candidate	Votes	%	±%
BJP	Leela Ram	72,664	45.79	▲20.63
INC	Randeep Surjewala	71,418	45.00	▲1.81
JJP	Ramphal Malik	6,358	4.01	
Sarva Hit Party	Jashvir	2,243	1.41	
BSP	Madan	2,212	1.39	▼0.4
Margin of victory		1,246	0.79	▼14.82
Turnout		1,58,697	78.07	▼5.64
Registered electors		2,03,287		▲12.16
BJP gain from INC		Swing	▲2.60	

=== Assembly Election 2014 ===
2014 Haryana Legislative Assembly election: Kaithal
Party	Candidate	Votes	%	±%
INC	Randeep Surjewala	65,524	43.19	▼8.11
INLD	Kailash Bhagat	41,849	27.58	▼4.44
BJP	Surinder Singh	38,171	25.16	▲23.75
BSP	Nirmala Jangra	2,722	1.79	▼10.17
Margin of victory		23,675	15.60	▼3.67
Turnout		1,51,716	83.71	▲6.25
Registered electors		1,81,246		▲20.23
INC hold		Swing	▼8.11	

=== Assembly Election 2009 ===
2009 Haryana Legislative Assembly election: Kaithal
Party	Candidate	Votes	%	±%
INC	Randeep Surjewala	59,889	51.29	▲3.58
INLD	Kailash Bhagat	37,387	32.02	▼10.09
BSP	Suresh Kumar	13,967	11.96	▲10.05
BJP	Ravi Bhushan	1,649	1.41	▼2.51
Independent	Shamsher Singh Kashyap	973	0.83	
Independent	Naresh Kumar	590	0.51	
Margin of victory		22,502	19.27	▲13.67
Turnout		1,16,757	77.45	▲5.90
Registered electors		1,50,744		▲18.11
INC hold		Swing	▲3.58	

=== Assembly Election 2005 ===
2005 Haryana Legislative Assembly election: Kaithal
Party	Candidate	Votes	%	±%
INC	Shamsher Singh Surjewala	43,573	47.71	▲28.14
INLD	Kailash Bhagat	38,461	42.12	▼0.16
BJP	Ravi Bhushan	3,578	3.92	
BSP	Abhay Ram	1,743	1.91	▼2.28
BRP	Jaibhagwan	1,212	1.33	
CPI(M)	Prem	777	0.85	
Independent	Roshan Lal	618	0.68	
SP	Jogindra Singh	592	0.65	
Margin of victory		5,112	5.60	▼15.82
Turnout		91,322	71.55	▼0.09
Registered electors		1,27,632		▲9.08
INC gain from INLD		Swing	▲5.43	

=== Assembly Election 2000 ===
2000 Haryana Legislative Assembly election: Kaithal
Party	Candidate	Votes	%	±%
INLD	Leela Ram	35,440	42.28	
Independent	Dharam Pal S/O Didara	17,483	20.86	
INC	Surinder Kumar	16,410	19.58	▲8.23
Independent	Rajinder Sharma	7,399	8.83	
BSP	Ashok Seth	3,513	4.19	▼0.15
Independent	Dalbir	945	1.13	
HVP	Mani Ram	799	0.95	▼27.49
NCP	Baldev Singh	599	0.71	
Independent	Dharam Pal S/O Amrit Lal	465	0.55	
Margin of victory		17,957	21.42	▲16.21
Turnout		83,823	71.65	▲0.28
Registered electors		1,17,004		▲2.60
INLD gain from SAP		Swing	▲8.63	

=== Assembly Election 1996 ===
1996 Haryana Legislative Assembly election: Kaithal
Party	Candidate	Votes	%	±%
SAP	Charan Dass	27,384	33.65	
HVP	Roshan Lal Tiwari	23,145	28.44	▲3.2
Independent	Surinder Kumar	15,330	18.84	
INC	Rajinder Kumar	9,235	11.35	▼14.55
BSP	Jasbir	3,535	4.34	
Independent	Raj Kumar	420	0.52	
Margin of victory		4,239	5.21	▲4.55
Turnout		81,374	73.79	▲0.39
Registered electors		1,14,035		▲21.93
SAP gain from INC		Swing	▲7.75	

=== Assembly Election 1991 ===
1991 Haryana Legislative Assembly election: Kaithal
Party	Candidate	Votes	%	±%
INC	Surinder Kumar	17,190	25.90	▲2.66
HVP	Charan Das	16,753	25.24	
JP	Leela Ram	13,822	20.83	
BJP	Mai Lal	7,531	11.35	
Independent	Surinder Singh	6,096	9.19	
Independent	Narender	1,586	2.39	
Independent	Mehar Singh	855	1.29	
Independent	Hukam Chand	620	0.93	
Independent	Surjan	581	0.88	
Margin of victory		437	0.66	▼10.08
Turnout		66,368	73.32	▼3.61
Registered electors		93,522		▲11.99
INC gain from LKD		Swing	▼16.37	

=== Assembly Election 1987 ===
1987 Haryana Legislative Assembly election: Kaithal
Party	Candidate	Votes	%	±%
LKD	Surinder Kumar	26,326	42.27	
Independent	Charan Dass	19,637	31.53	
INC	Roshan Lal	14,472	23.24	▼9.59
Independent	Ram Kumar	574	0.92	
Margin of victory		6,689	10.74	▲3.18
Turnout		62,275	75.71	▼1.57
Registered electors		83,509		▲22.33
LKD gain from Independent		Swing	▲1.88	

=== Assembly Election 1982 ===
1982 Haryana Legislative Assembly election: Kaithal
Party	Candidate	Votes	%	±%
Independent	Roshan Lal	20,996	40.39	
INC	Davinder Shrma	17,067	32.83	▲30.03
BJP	Amar Nath	12,410	23.87	
Independent	Shiv Kumar	411	0.79	
Independent	Sukhdev Puri	303	0.58	
Margin of victory		3,929	7.56	▼2.37
Turnout		51,981	77.31	▲5.76
Registered electors		68,265		▲20.90
Independent gain from JP		Swing	▼12.06	

=== Assembly Election 1977 ===
1977 Haryana Legislative Assembly election: Kaithal
Party	Candidate	Votes	%	±%
JP	Raghunath	20,846	52.46	
Independent	Om Prabha	16,901	42.53	
INC	Man Singh	1,115	2.81	▼39.66
Independent	Dal Singh	474	1.19	
Independent	Pokhar Das	292	0.73	
Margin of victory		3,945	9.93	▲3.52
Turnout		39,740	71.01	▼8.05
Registered electors		56,464		▼17.06
JP gain from Independent		Swing	▲3.59	

=== Assembly Election 1972 ===
1972 Haryana Legislative Assembly election: Kaithal
Party	Candidate	Votes	%	±%
Independent	Charan Dass	26,095	48.87	
INC	Om Parbha	22,673	42.46	▼7.94
Independent	Harchet Singh	1,525	2.86	
Independent	Dhan Pat	929	1.74	
Independent	Zile Singh	587	1.10	
Independent	Wattu Ram	518	0.97	
Independent	Kusum	429	0.80	
Independent	Prem Chand	355	0.66	
Independent	Sheo Parshad	174	0.33	
Independent	Alla Dass	111	0.21	
Margin of victory		3,422	6.41	▲0.90
Turnout		53,396	80.25	▲7.62
Registered electors		68,080		▲14.23
Independent gain from INC		Swing	▼1.54	

=== Assembly Election 1968 ===
1968 Haryana Legislative Assembly election: Kaithal
Party	Candidate	Votes	%	±%
INC	Om Prabha	21,273	50.41	▼1.15
ABJS	Gian Chand	18,950	44.90	
RPI	Lila Singh	1,189	2.82	
Independent	Lal Chand	791	1.87	
Margin of victory		2,323	5.50	▲1.00
Turnout		42,203	72.38	▼4.18
Registered electors		59,598		▲5.07
INC hold		Swing	▼1.15	

=== Assembly Election 1967 ===
1967 Haryana Legislative Assembly election: Kaithal
Party	Candidate	Votes	%	±%
INC	Om Parbha	21,933	51.56	
SWA	A. Chand	20,015	47.05	
Independent	T. Chand	590	1.39	
Margin of victory		1,918	4.51	
Turnout		42,538	78.02	
Registered electors		56,724		
INC win (new seat)				

== See also ==
- Kaithal
- Kaithal district
- List of constituencies of the Haryana Legislative Assembly
