= Shamsher Singh Surjewala =

Indian lawyer and politician (1932–2020)

Member of Parliament, Rajya Sabha
- In office 1992–1998
- Constituency: Haryana

Haryana Legislative Assembly
- In office 1967–1972
- Constituency: Narwana
- In office 1977–1987
- Constituency: Narwana
- In office 1991–1992
- Constituency: Narwana
- In office 2005–2009
- Constituency: Kaithal

Personal details
- Born: 24 March 1932 Jind, Punjab, British India (now in Haryana, India)
- Died: 20 January 2020 (aged 87) New Delhi, India
- Party: Indian National Congress
- Relatives: Randeep Singh Surjewala (son)

Shamsher Singh Surjewala (24 March 1932 – 20 January 2020) was an Indian lawyer and politician from Haryana belonging to Indian National Congress. He was a member of the Rajya Sabha and Haryana Legislative Assembly. He also served as the president of the Haryana Pradesh Congress Committee, minister of the Government of Haryana and the leader of the opposition in the Haryana Legislative Assembly. He was the father of Randeep Singh Surjewala.

== Biography ==
Surjewala was born on 24 March 1932. He was involved in politics during his student life. He was expelled from Yadavindra State High School by the ruler of Sangrur as he espoused the agenda of Indian National Congress.

Surjewala started law practice in 1957. He was elected as the managing director of the Central Bank of Sangrur and chairman of the panchayat samiti of Kalayat in Kaithal.

Surjewala was elected as a member of the Haryana Legislative Assembly in 1967, 1977, 1982 and 1991 from Narwana. In 1992 he was elected as a member of the Rajya Sabha from Haryana. Later, he was elected as a member of the Haryana Legislative Assembly from Kaithal in 2005. He served four times as a minister of the Government of Haryana. He also served as the leader of the opposition in the Haryana Legislative Assembly.

Surjewala worked for the rights of the farmers. He was the president of the Haryana Krishak Samaj and All India Kisan Congress. He also served as the president of the Haryana Pradesh Congress Committee.

Surjewala died on 20 January 2020 at All India Institute of Medical Sciences Hospital, New Delhi at the age of 87.
