= Birender Singh (politician, born 1946) =

Indian politician

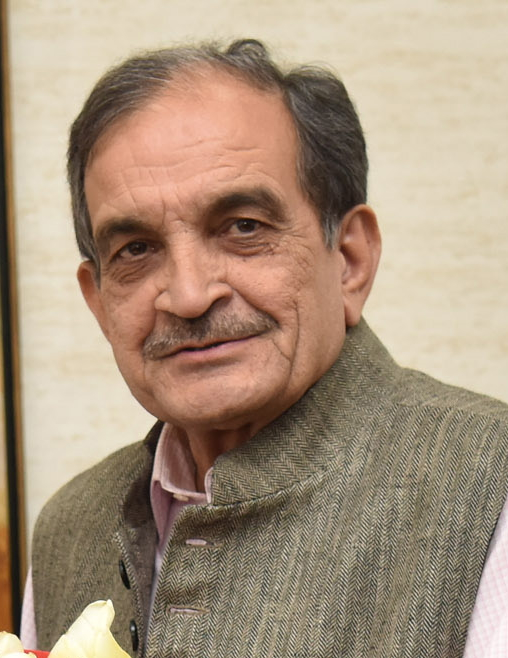

Member of Parliament, Rajya Sabha
- In office 2 August 2016 – 20 January 2020
- Constituency: Haryana
- In office 29 November 2014 – 1 August 2016
- Constituency: Haryana
- In office 2 August 2010 – 28 August 2014
- Constituency: Haryana

Minister of Steel
- In office 5 July 2016 – 14 April 2019
- Prime Minister: Narendra Modi
- Preceded by: Narendra Singh Tomar
- Succeeded by: Dharmendra Pradhan

Minister of Panchayati Raj
- In office 9 November 2014 – 5 July 2016
- Prime Minister: Narendra Modi
- Preceded by: Nitin Gadkari
- Succeeded by: Narendra Singh Tomar

Minister of Rural Development
- In office 9 November 2014 – 5 July 2016
- Prime Minister: Narendra Modi
- Preceded by: Nitin Gadkari
- Succeeded by: Narendra Singh Tomar

Minister of Drinking Water and Sanitation
- In office 9 November 2014 – 5 July 2016
- Prime Minister: Narendra Modi
- Preceded by: Nitin Gadkari
- Succeeded by: Ramesh Jigajinagi, Narendra Singh Tomar

Member of Parliament, Lok Sabha
- In office 31 December 1984 – 30 November 1989
- Preceded by: Mani Ram Bagri
- Succeeded by: Jai Parkash
- Constituency: Hisar

Personal details
- Born: 25 March 1946 (age 80) Rohtak, Punjab, British India
- Party: INC (1972–2014)(2024-present); BJP (2014–2024)
- Spouse: Premlata Singh
- Children: 2, including Brijendra Singh

Chaudhary Birender Singh Sheokand (born 25 March 1946) is a senior Indian political leader and a well-known face in Indian Politics. He lately served as Minister of Rural Development, Panchayati Raj, Sanitation & Drinking Water from 2014 to 2016 and later as the Union Minister of Steel from 2016 to 2019 in the Narendra Modi led NDA Government in India.

Birender Singh is the maternal grandson of the peasant leader, Sir Chhotu Ram. His father Chaudhary Neki Ram was a politician in joint Punjab. His association with the Indian National Congress started over 52 years ago, which resumed in April 2024 after Chaudhary Birender Singh joined the party on 9 April 2024, after serving BJP for a period of 9 years 8 months before it.

== Early life ==
He was born in a Sheokand Jaat family of Bangar belt of Jind district. Singh comes from a socially, politically, and economically influential family. His maternal grandfather Sir Chhotu Ram was an iconic peasant leader in India and Pakistan. He graduated from Government College, Rohtak and completed his law degree at Panjab University, Chandigarh. During this development, Singh was active in sports, captaining the district. Jind cricket team 1964–67 and playing with Punjab University Team (1969–70).

Birender Singh married Premlata Singh on 9 June 1970. Premlata Singh has been a member of the legislative assembly of Haryana representing Uchana Kalan constituency from 2014 to 2019.

His son Brijendra Singh was previously a bureaucrat who served as an IAS officer of 1998 Batch and was posted in Haryana for 21 years. He elected as Member of Parliament from Hisar in 2019 Indian general election.

== Political life- Elections Won ==
Birender Singh won five times from Uchana to be a legislator in Haryana Vidhansabha (1977–82, 1982–84, 1991–96, 1996–2000 and 2005–09) and served three times as Cabinet Minister in Haryana. He has also served as a Parliamentarian three times.

Birender Singh contested his first election in 1972 & from 1972 to 1977, he was the Chairman of Block Samiti Uchana.

He contested the legislative assembly election in 1977 from Uchana Kalan constituency on Indian National Congress ticket and won the seat with a sizeable margin, despite a strong anti-congress wave in the country. This made him a star political figure in India overnight. During his first term as MLA, He was chairman, Govt. Assurances Committee (1978–79) and chairman, Estimates Committee (1981–82), Haryana.

During his second term as MLA in Haryana, Ch. Birender Singh held the portfolio of Cooperatives and Dairy Development Ministry in Haryana from 1982 to 1984.

In 1984, Ch. Birender Singh was elected as Member of Parliament (Lok Sabha) from Hisar Constituency, after defeating Om Prakash Chautala by a giant margin. During this term as a Loksabha MP, Ch. Birender Singh was a member of Estimates Committee of the Parliament (1984–86), Consulative Committee on Defence (1986–88), and Consultative Committee on Power (1988–89).

During his third term as MLA (1991–96), Ch. Birender Singh held the portfolio of Revenue and Planning Ministry in Haryana from 1991 to 1992.

During his fifth term as MLA (2005–09), Ch. Birender Singh held the portfolio of Finance, Labour and Employment Ministry in Haryana from 2005 to 2009, also serving as Excise and Taxation Minister from 2007 to 2009.

In 2010, Birender Singh was elected as Congress' MP Rajya Sabha from Haryana for a 6 years term (2010–16) from which he resigned in 2014 before joining BJP. During his term as Rajya Sabha MP from Congress, Birender Singh served as the chairman, Standing Committee of Parliament on Human Resource, Women & Child Development, Youth & Sports Ministry from Sept 2013 to April 2014.

Birender Singh joined Bharatiya Janata Party on 29 August 2014, after tendering his resignation from the membership of Rajya Sabha, the upper house of the Parliament of India on 28 August 2014.

He was elected for Rajya Sabha again as BJP MP, for the remaining two-year term (2014-2016). In November 2014, Ch. Birender Singh took oath as a Cabinet Minister, Govt. Of India. and was given the charge of the Ministry of Rural Development, Ministry of Panchayati Raj and Ministry of Drinking Water and Sanitation.

He was re-elected to Rajya Sabha for the third time on 11 June 2016 for a six-year term (2016-2022). In July 2016, during the second cabinet reshuffle of the Narendra Modi ministry, Chaudhary Birender Singh replaced Narendra Singh Tomar as the Steel Minister.

He resigned two years before the end of his tenure, after his son Brijendra Singh won from Hisar Loksabha Constituency in 2019 general elections.

== Political Life- Organisational Roles ==
Singh has held numerous key organisational positions in Haryana and National Politics.

From 1977 to 1980, he served as President of District Jind Unit of Congress as well as Youth Congress.

In 1980, he was appointed President of Haryana Youth Congress, a position he held for 2 years.

In 1985, he was appointed President of Haryana Pradesh Congress Committee. He also served as Observer in Elections to Maharashtra Legislative Assembly in the same year.

In 1987, he was appointed a Special Invitee to Congress Working Committee.

In 1990, he was appointed President of Haryana Pradesh Congress Committee by Rajiv Gandhi and led Congress to absolute majority in 1991 Legislative Assembly Elections of Haryana. During the same year, he served as Incharge of Elections to the State Organisation of Congress in Karnataka.

In 1998, Birender Singh served as Congress' General Secretary, Incharge of Rajasthan and Pradesh Returning Officer for Congress for Uttar Pradesh.

From 1998 to 2002, he served on the Central Election Committee of Congress, its highest decision making core group.

In 2002, Birender Singh served as Congress' observer to elections to Legislative Assembly of Uttar Pradesh.

In 2004, Birender Singh was appointed by Congress as the General Secretary Incharge of Uttar Pradesh and served as Chairman of the Congress' screening committee for Maharashtra.

In 2011, he was made the general secretary of AICC in charge of poll-bound states of Uttarakhand and Himachal Pradesh. Ch. Birender Singh led the party to victory in Uttarakhand and Himachal Pradesh elections, which were fought under his guidance. In 2014, Birender Singh resigned from Congress after serving the party for 42 years.

Lok Sabha
Preceded by Mani Ram Bagri	Member of Parliament for Hisar; 1984–1989	Succeeded by Jai Parkash
Political offices
Preceded by Nitin Gadkari	Minister of Rural Development; 9 November 2014 – 5 July 2016	Succeeded by Narendra Singh Tomar
Preceded by Nitin Gadkari	Minister of Panchayati Raj; 9 November 2014 – 5 July 2016	Succeeded by Narendra Singh Tomar
Preceded by Nitin Gadkari	Minister of Drinking Water and Sanitation; 9 November 2014 – 5 July 2016	Succeeded by Narendra Singh Tomar
Preceded by Narendra Singh Tomar	Minister of Steel; 5 July 2016 – 14 April 2019	Succeeded by Dharmendra Pradhan
