= Randeep Surjewala =

Indian politician (born 1967)

Randeep Singh Surjewala
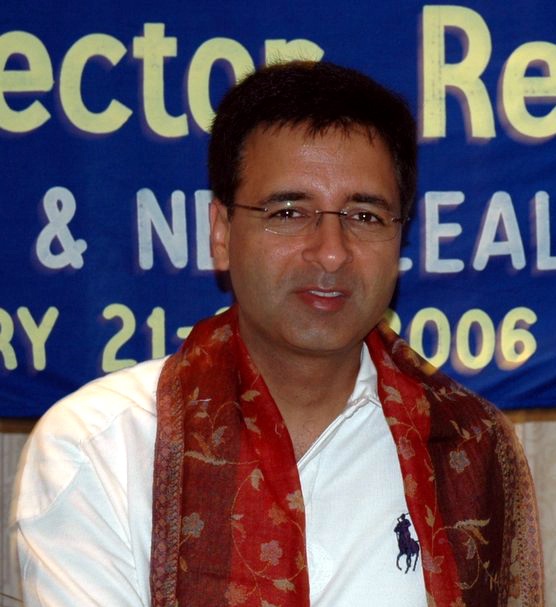

Member of Parliament, Rajya Sabha
- Incumbent
- Assumed office 5 July 2022
- Preceded by: Om Prakash Mathur
- Constituency: Rajasthan

General Secretary of AICC for Karnataka
- Incumbent
- Assumed office 11 September 2020
- Preceded by: K.C. Venugopal

National Spokesperson of Indian National Congress

Member of Legislative Assembly, Haryana
- In office 2009 – 24 October 2019
- Succeeded by: Leela Ram
- Constituency: Kaithal
- In office 2005–2009
- Preceded by: Om Prakash Chautala
- Succeeded by: Pirthi Singh Numberdar
- Constituency: Narwana
- In office 1996–2000
- Preceded by: Om Prakash Chautala
- Succeeded by: Om Prakash Chautala
- Constituency: Narwana

Personal details
- Born: 3 June 1967 (age 59) Chandigarh, India
- Party: Indian National Congress
- Spouse: Gayatri Surjewala
- Children: Arjun, Aditya
- Education: Bachelor of Commerce (Hons.), Bachelor of Law & Post graduation in Political Science
- Alma mater: DAV College, Chandigarh & Punjab University, Chandigarh
- Occupation: Politician & Lawyer

Randeep Singh Surjewala (born 3 June 1967) is an Indian politician from Haryana and a member of Indian National Congress party. He was an MLA in the Haryana state legislature until 2019 and a former minister. He held water supply and sanitation, parliamentary affairs, electronics and information technology, science and technology and public works as a minister in Haryana cabinet. In 2005, he was given the responsibility of Transport and Parliamentary Affairs and thus became the youngest minister in Haryana. He defeated Om Prakash Chautala in 1996 and 2005. As of December 2017, Surjewala is one of the official spokespersons of Indian National Congress party, and as of September 2021, is a General Secretary of the Indian National Congress and Party in-charge for Karnataka. In the biennial elections of the Rajya Sabha for the State of Rajasthan, held on 10 June 2022, Mr. Surjewala was elected as a Member of Parliament, Rajya Sabha, with his term to start on 5 July 2022.

== Early life ==
Randeep Singh Surjewala was born in Chandigarh as the youngest and fourth child of Ch. Shamsher Singh Surjewala and Vidya Kulharia in a Jat family of Nain clan. His father was then Minister for Agriculture & Co-operatives of Haryana. He has three elder sisters – Madhu Dalal, Poonam Chaudhery and Neeru.

He went to Adarsh Bal Mandir and Arya Higher Secondary School, Narwana. He did his Bachelor of Commerce (Hons.) (1981–85) from DAV School and his Bachelor of Law degree (1985–88) from Faculty of Law, Punjab University, Chandigarh. During his years in law faculty, he remained member of the consultative committee of the faculty as also chairman of the Lawyer's Forum. He also earned his master's degree in political science by the same university in April 1995.

His father was expelled from Yadvindra State High School by the ruler of Sangrur for espousing the agenda of Indian National Congress.

In September 1987, his father started his law practice as an ace lawyer specializing in criminal law and jurisprudence but amiably graduated to grassroots politics. He was first elected as managing director of Central Co-operative Bank, Sangur, in 1959–1960 and then as chairman of Panchayat Samiti, Kalayat (now in District Kaithal) in 1961 and again in 1964.

Randeep’s father is also a veteran parliamentarian, having been elected to Haryana Legislative Assembly in 1967, 1977, 1982, 1991 and 2005 and to Indian Parliament in 1993.

== Career ==
=== As a lawyer ===
Surjewala started his practice as an advocate at 21 in 1988. He commenced his practice with the solicitors firm ‘Shroff & Company, New Delhi’ in 1988 and later in the High Court of Punjab & Haryana at Chandigarh in 1991. Besides corporate and commercial litigation, he took up issues relating to farmers for their land.

==== Organisational roles ====
At the age of 17, he was appointed as the youngest general secretary of Haryana Pradesh Youth Congress. He was also appointed as the youngest senator of the Punjab University, Chandigarh, in 1992. He also remained a member of the faculty consultative committee in the law faculty.

He was again the youngest member to the syndicate of Panjab University, Chandigarh from 1995–96 and member of academic council, member of joint consultative committee and youth affairs committee of the Punjab University Chandigarh. He also served as chairman of the Haryana Lawyers' Forum from 1990 to 1995. From 1987 to 1990, he was an active participant to rebuild the Congress in Haryana alongside his father, then PCC president.

In March 2000, Surjewala became first ‘Haryanvi’ to be appointed as the national president of the Indian Youth Congress (IYC). He continued to be the president up till February 2005, thus making it the longest tenure in the history of IYC.

In August 2004, the youngest office bearer. In the run-up to the assembly elections in Haryana, he was appointed as working president of Haryana Pradesh Congress Committee in December 2004 at the age of 37, the youngest president of PCC in the State.

=== Elections ===
He contested four elections to the Haryana Legislative Assembly, 1993 bye election, 1996, 2000 and 2005. The party chose to field him against former Chief Minister, Om Prakash Chautala. He won in 1996 and 2005 defeating him on both the occasions, a historical victory over then sitting Chief Minister.He lost to Lila Ram Gujjar of BJP in 2019 Kaithal Assembly Election. Surjewala was elected to the Rajya Sabha in 2022 from Rajasthan.

=== As a Minister ===
In March 2005, Surjewala was inducted as the youngest Cabinet Minister in Haryana Cabinet headed by Chief Minister, Bhupinder Singh Hooda.

In September 2007, Surjewala was a Minister for Power; PWD (Water Supply & Sanitation) and Parliamentary Affairs and heads the Standing Policy Framing Committee on Civil Aviation.

In November 2009, Surjewala became Cabinet minister in Haryana Government, and held the portfolios of Water Supply and Sanitation, Parliamentary Affairs, Electronics and Information Technology, Science and Technology and Public Works (Building and Roads) Department.

==== Rajya Sabha ====
In 2022 Randeep Surjewala became a Member of Parliament (Rajya Sabha) from Rajasthan on Indian National Congress nomination.

== Legal Issues ==
Surjewala has also been called for questioning by Assam Crime Branch on 23 May 2026 in Pawan Khera case registered on the complaint of Riniki Bhuyan Sarma, wife of Assam Chief Minister Himanta Biswa Sarma at Crime Branch of Panbazar Police Station in Guwahati.

== Personal life ==
Surjewala married Gayatri in December 1991 and has two sons Arjun and Aditya.

== Positions held ==
| Year | Description |
|---|---|
| 1996 - 1999 | Elected to 9th Haryana Assembly (1st term) |
| 2005 - 2009 | Elected to 11th Haryana Assembly (2nd term): Cabinet Minister for Transport & Civil Aviation PWD (Water Supply & Sanitation) and Parliamentary Affairs (2005-07); Cabinet Minister for Power, PWD (Water Supply & Sanitation) and Parliamentary Affairs (2007-09) |
| 2009 - 2014 | Elected to 12th Haryana Assembly (3rd term): Cabinet Minister for P.W.D (Building & Roads), Public Health Engineering, Parliamentary Affairs, Electronics & Information Technology and Science & Technology (2009-11); Cabinet Minister of Industries & Commerce, Parliamentary Affairs, Science & Technology and P.W.D ( Building & Roads) (2011-14) |
| 2014 - 2019 | Elected to 13th Haryana Assembly (4th term) |
| 2022 - Till date | Elected to Rajya Sabha (1st term) |

== Elections contested ==
=== Haryana Legislative Assembly ===
| Year | Party | Constituency | Result | Vote | Opposition Candidate | Opposition Party | Opposition vote | Ref |
|---|---|---|---|---|---|---|---|---|
| 1993 (By election) | INC | Narwana | Lost | 28,342 | Om Prakash Chautala | JP | 47,297 | |
| 1996 | INC | Narwana | Won | 28,286 | Jai Prakash | HVP | 27,437 | |
| 2000 | INC | Narwana | Lost | 39,729 | Om Prakash Chautala | INLD | 41,923 | |
| 2005 | INC | Narwana | Won | 52,813 | Om Prakash Chautala | INLD | 50,954 | |
| 2009 | INC | Kaithal | Won | 59,889 | Kailash Bhagat | INLD | 37,387 | |
| 2014 | INC | Kaithal | Won | 65,524 | Kailash Bhagat | INLD | 41,849 | |
| 2019 (By election) | INC | Jind | Lost | 22,740 | Krishan Lal Middha | BJP | 50,566 | |
| 2019 | INC | Kaithal | Lost | 71,418 | Leela Ram | BJP | 72,664 | |
