= Gahra =

- village
- Location in Haryana, India Gahra (India)
- Coordinates: 28.36°N 76.31°E
- Country: India
- State: Haryana
- District: Mahendragarh

Languages
  - Official: Hindi
- Time zone: UTC+5:30 (IST)
- PIN: 123027
- Telephone code: 01285
- ISO 3166 code: IN-HR
- Vehicle registration: HR
- Nearest city: Kanina
- Lok Sabha constituency: Mahendragarh
- Vidhan Sabha constituency: Kanina
- Climate: Dry (Köppen)
- Website: haryana.gov.in

Gahra is a village in Kanina on an approach road 4 km in Mahendragarh District of Haryana State, India. It is located 47 km to the north of District headquarters Narnaul. 4 km from Kanina. 312 km from State capital Chandigarh.

Gahra Pin code is 123027 and the postal head office is Kanina.

== Geography ==
Garha is located at 28.36°N 76.31°E. Garha has an average elevation of 245 metres (803 feet). It borders Karoli, Bawwa, Kanina, and Kotia villages. Mahendragarh, Charkhi Dadri, Rewari, Narnaul are the nearby cities to Gahra.

The temperature can go as high as 46.5 degrees Celsius from May to July. Winter is from November to February, and the temperature can fall to 5 degrees Celsius in December and January. The village is in the Mahendragarh district and has dust storms in summer. Rugged hilly terrain of Aravali ranges as well as sandy dunes are found in nearby villages.

The overall climate is dry. Rain falls from July to September. A little rain is experienced during winter also.

Gahra is nearly 20 km away from Mahendergarh district and nearly 36 km away from Rewari district and it is nearly 110 km away from the national capital of Delhi.

== See also ==
- Karoli
- Lookhi
- Kosli
- Kanina khas
- Rewari
- Mahendragarh
