= Bawwa =

- Village
- Location in Haryana, India Bawwa (India)
- Coordinates: 28.39°N 76.31°E
- Country: India
- State: Haryana
- District: Rewari

Government
  - Type: Yadavs (Rao Sahab)

Population
  - Total: 4,500 Approx

Languages
  - Official: Hindi
- Time zone: UTC+5:30 (IST)
- PIN: 123303
- Telephone code: 01259
- ISO 3166 code: IN-HR
- Nearest city: Kanina, Kosli
- Literacy: 80%
- Lok Sabha constituency: Rohtak
- Vidhan Sabha constituency: Kosli
- Climate: Dry (Köppen)
- Website: haryana.gov.in

Bawwa is a village in the Nahar Block of the Rewari District in Haryana, India. It is located 50 kilometres (31 mi) northwest of the district headquarters of Rewari, 10 kilometres (6.2 mi) west-southwest of Nahar, and 320 kilometres (200 mi) from the state capital Chandigarh. Karoli, Garhs, Sihor, Bahala, Naya-Gaon, and Gadhi are the neighboring villages. Bawwa is situated approximately 3 km from Karoli mod on Kanina-Bahu-Jholri road in the Rewari District.

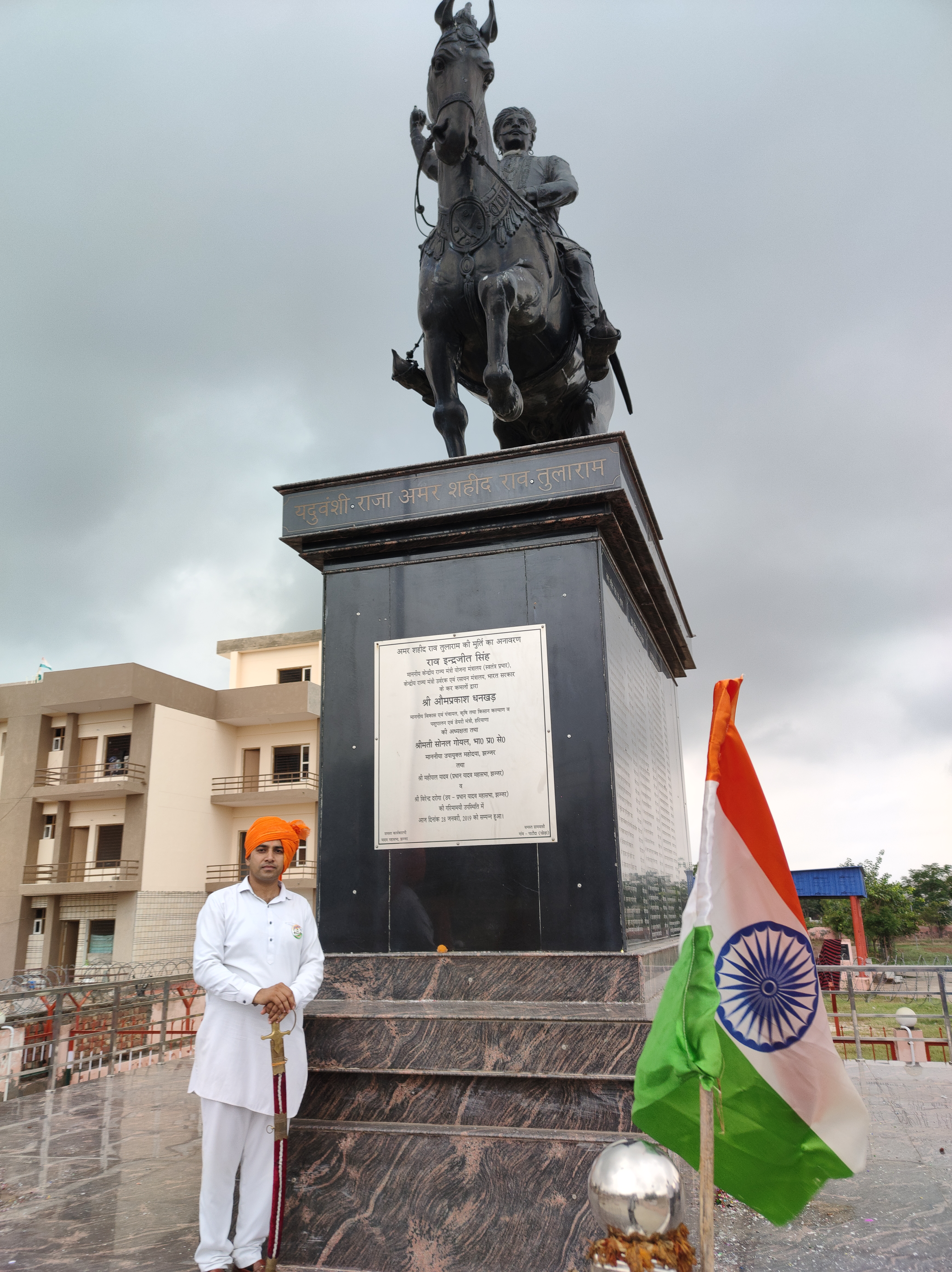
Rao Tularam, 1857 freedom fighter

The village is well known for its fertile land. The ahirwati dialect of Hindi is spoken locally. Religious sites near the village include Shiv Mandir, Sheetla Mata Mandir, Devi Mandir, and Shedh Bhaiya. The deity Dada Puranmal is the kuldevta of the village.

== Demographics ==
Bawwa Village has a population of approximately 4,500. The Yadav (Ahir) caste of Tondak Gotra forms the majority of the population. Bawwa is a part of Ahirwal, the land of Ahirs. Ahirwal includes the Mahendragarh-Kanina-Narnaul area and Alwar, which also has a large population of Ahirs (Yadavs).

== Geography ==
Bawwa has an average ground elevation of 242 metres (794 ft). It borders Karoli in the south-east, Garhi in the north-east, Bahala and Naya-Gaon in the north, Sehore in the north-west and Gahra in the south-west. The temperature usually reaches 45 °C (113 °F) during the summer and can fall to 5 °C (41 °F) during the winter.

The village is adjacent to the Mahendergarh district and experiences dust storms known as Loo during the summer. Sand dunes are also found in nearby villages.

Bawwa has a dry climate, with rainfall occurring from July to September. Western Disturbance occasionally causes rain during the winter.

== Economy ==
Farming is the principal occupation in Bawwa. Many villagers are involved in the Defense Forces as well. At least one member of a family will serve while other members of the population will serve in the local government.

== Transport ==
Delhi Airport is approximately 120 kilometers from Bawwa via Rewari. It is a three-hour drive from Delhi Airport to Bawwa via the Delhi-Gurgaon Expressway, Gurgaon-Jaipur Highway, and Rewari-Kanina-Mahendergarh State Highway. State Highways connect Bawwa to all major towns in Haryana and adjacent districts of Rajasthan.

Bawwa is connected to Rewari by a State Highway (SH22) from Kanina, which is a major junction on the Indian railway network. Five railway lines connect it to Delhi (82 km away) and Ahmedabad on the major North-West trunk route, Bhiwani and Hissar towards Punjab, Bikaner via Kanina-Loharu-Sadulpur-Churu, Ajmer via Alwar and Jaipur and Ajmer via Ringas. The construction of a sixth railway is currently underway, which will connect Rewari to Jhajjhar and Rohtak. A planned seventh railway line, which will connect Rewari to Palwal and Khurja, has been under planning for over two decades, but has yet to be approved for construction (as of September 2010).

Bawwa is 7 km from the railway station in Kanina on the Rewari-Luharu-Sadulpur-Bikaner railway line and 17 km from the railway station in Kosli on the Rewari-Bhiwani-Hissar-Sirsa railway line. Both of these stations are connected to Delhi via Rewari.

== Education ==
Bawwa has four schools: two government and two private. The nearby towns Kanina and Kosli have a number of schools and colleges. The closest government college is in Nahar; several private colleges, including Ahir College and Kishanlal Public (KLP) College, have also been set up in Rewari (40 km away) and Mahendergarh (25 km away), which specialize in the fields of engineering, nursing, and management, among others.

== Facilities ==
- Angan Waadi
- Telephone Exchange
- Mahila Mandal
- Panchayat ghar
- Civil hospital
- Veterinary Hospital
- Primary health center
- Water Purification Center
- Village Pond (3 Johad)
- Post Office

== See also ==
- Kanina Khas
- Karoli
- Lookhi
- Mahendragarh
- Yadav
