= Nahar Block of Rewari =

Nahar Block Nahar
- village
- Location in Rewari, Haryana, India Nahar Block (India)
- Coordinates: 28.409434°N 76.397007°E
- Country: India
- State: Haryana
- District: Rewari

Languages
  - Official: Hindi
- Time zone: UTC+5:30 (IST)
- PIN: 123303
- Vehicle registration: HR 43 H
- Nearest city: Rewari, Kosli
- Sex ratio: 1:1 ♂/♀
- Literacy: 100%
- Website: www.jatusana.in

Nahar Block consists of 46 Gram Panchayats and 49 Villages. Its pincode number is 123303.

== Names of villages & Gram Panchayats ==
Sr. No. Name of Village

1. Ahamdpur Parthal- Name of Gram Panchyat- Ahamdpur Parthal (Nahar)
2. Bahala
3. Bahrampur
4. Bass Rattanthal
5. Bawwa
6. Bhakli
7. Bharangi
8. Bhurthala
9. Bishoha
10. Chhawa
11. Dharoli
12. Garhi
13. Gudiani
14. (A) Gugodh (Rewari), (B) Malesiyawas-Name of Gram Panchyat- Gugodh
15. Gujarwas
16. Jahidpur Tappa Kosli
17. Jakhala
18. (A)Jhal, (B) Bir Sarkar-Name of Gram Panchyat- Jhal
19. Jharoda
20. Jholri
21. Juddi
22. Kanharwas
23. Karoli
24. Kheri
25. Khurshid Nagar
26. Koharar
27. Kosli
28. Lilodh
29. Lukhi similar name Lookhi
30. Lula Ahir
31. Mumtajpur
32. Mundra
33. Nahar
34. Nangal
35. Nathera
36. Naya Gaon
37. Nehru Garh
38. Rattanthal
39. Shadat Nagar
40. (A)Shadipur,(B)Bhuriawas-Name of Gram Panchyat-Shadipur
41. Sham Nagar
42. Sudhrana
43. Surakhpur Tappa Kosli
44. Surheli
45. Tumna
46. Ushmapur
47. Rojgar Radar

== See also ==
- Rewari
