= Baba Thakur =

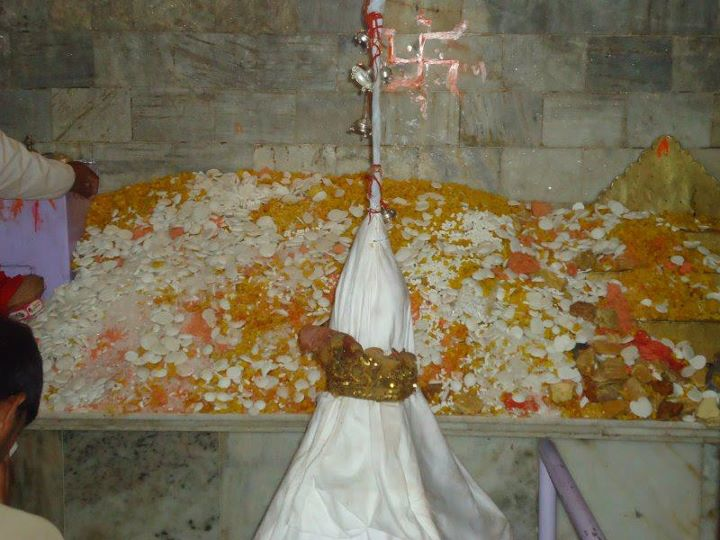
- Baba Thakur

Religion
- Affiliation: Hinduism
- District: Rewari
- Deity: Krishna

Location
- Location: Karoli
- State: Haryana
- Country: India
- Interactive map of Baba Thakur
- Coordinates: 28.38°N 76.33°E

Baba Thakur is a temple dedicated to Krishna in Karoli village of Kosli tehsil of Rewari district in Haryana state of India. "Thakur" is another name of Krishna.

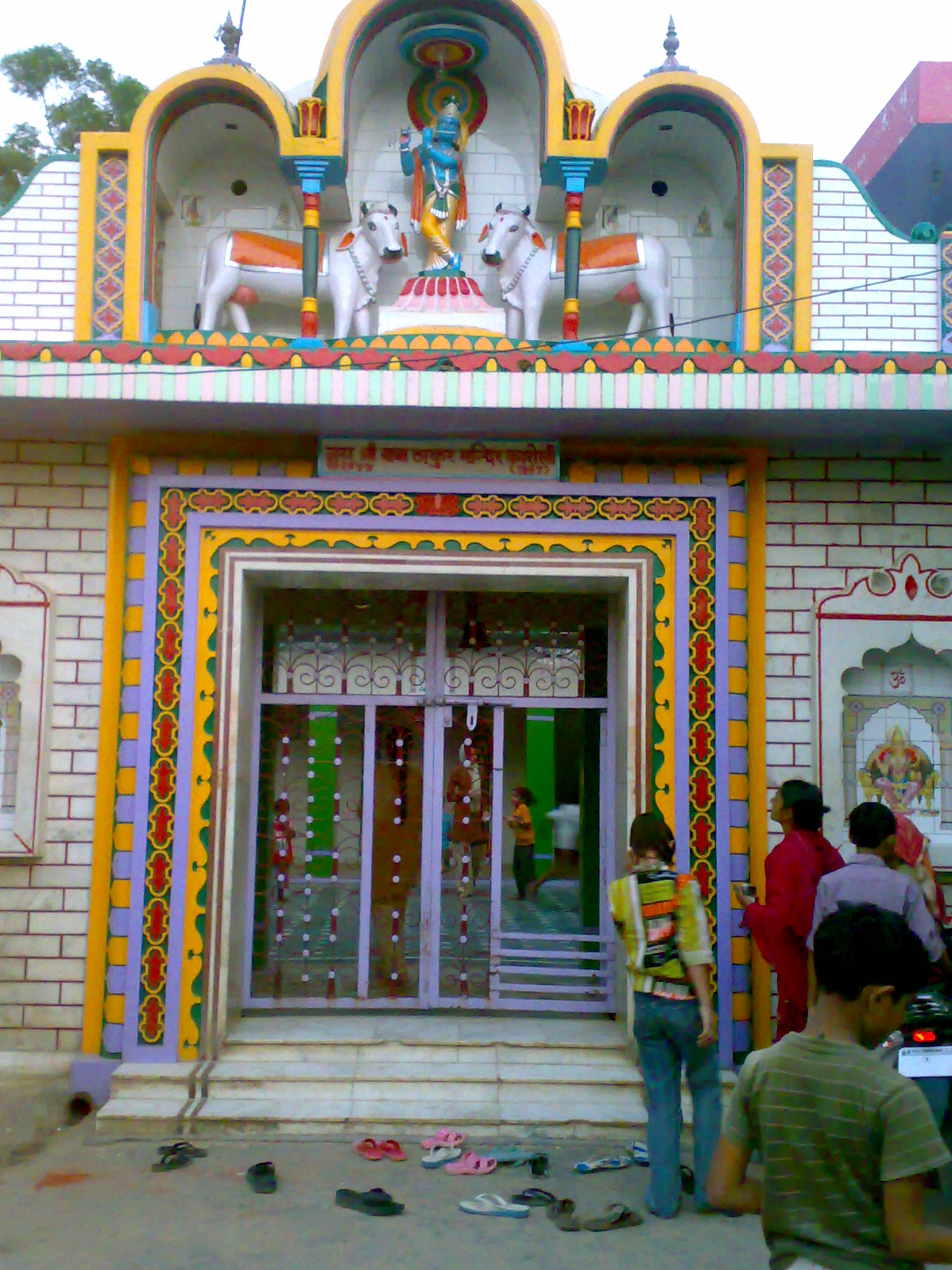
Main entrance to the temple.

The temple is said to be 150 years old. In 1997, the villagers renovated the temple, the renovation took two years.

== Gallery ==
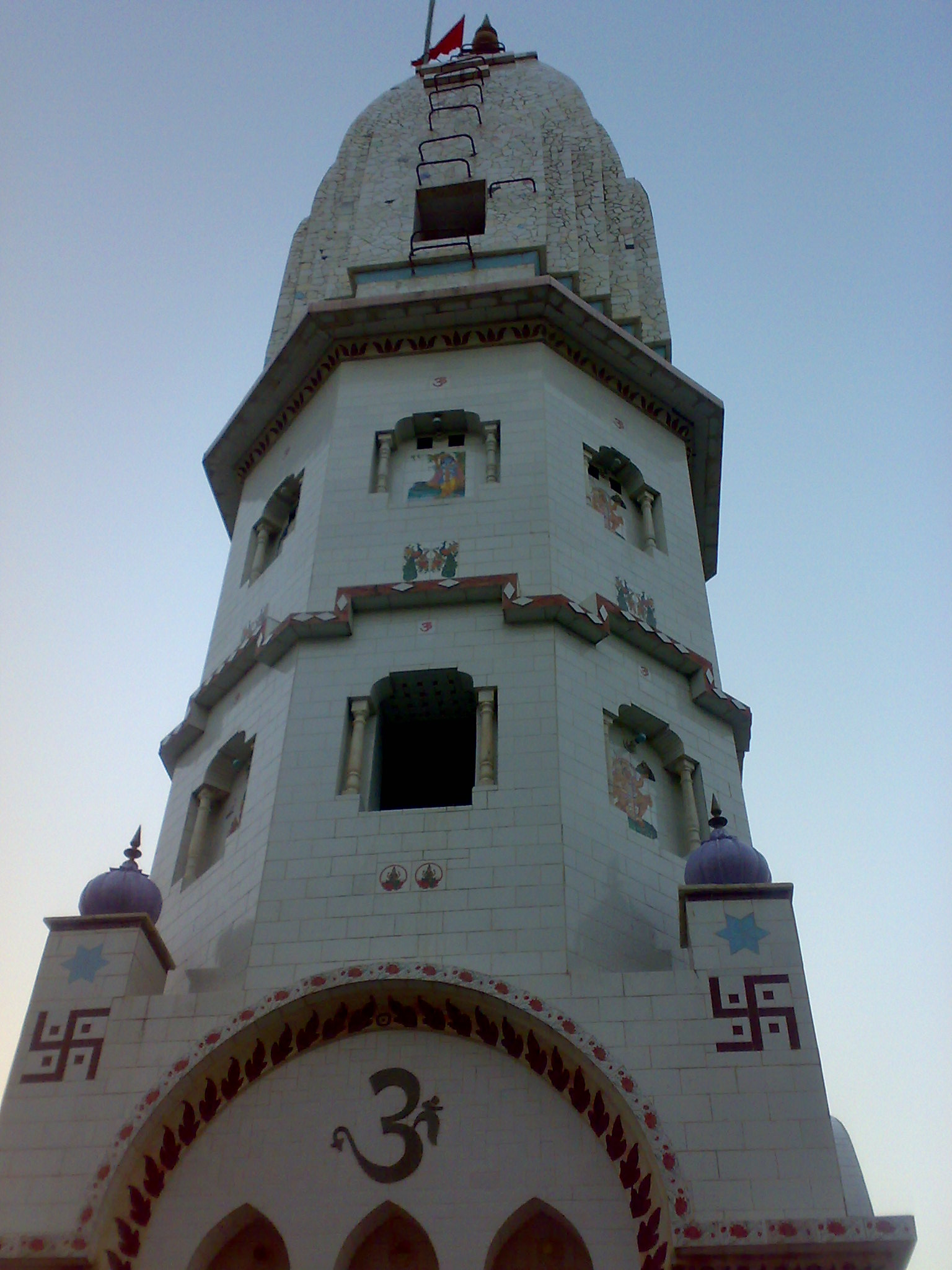
Baba Thakur Mandir Burz

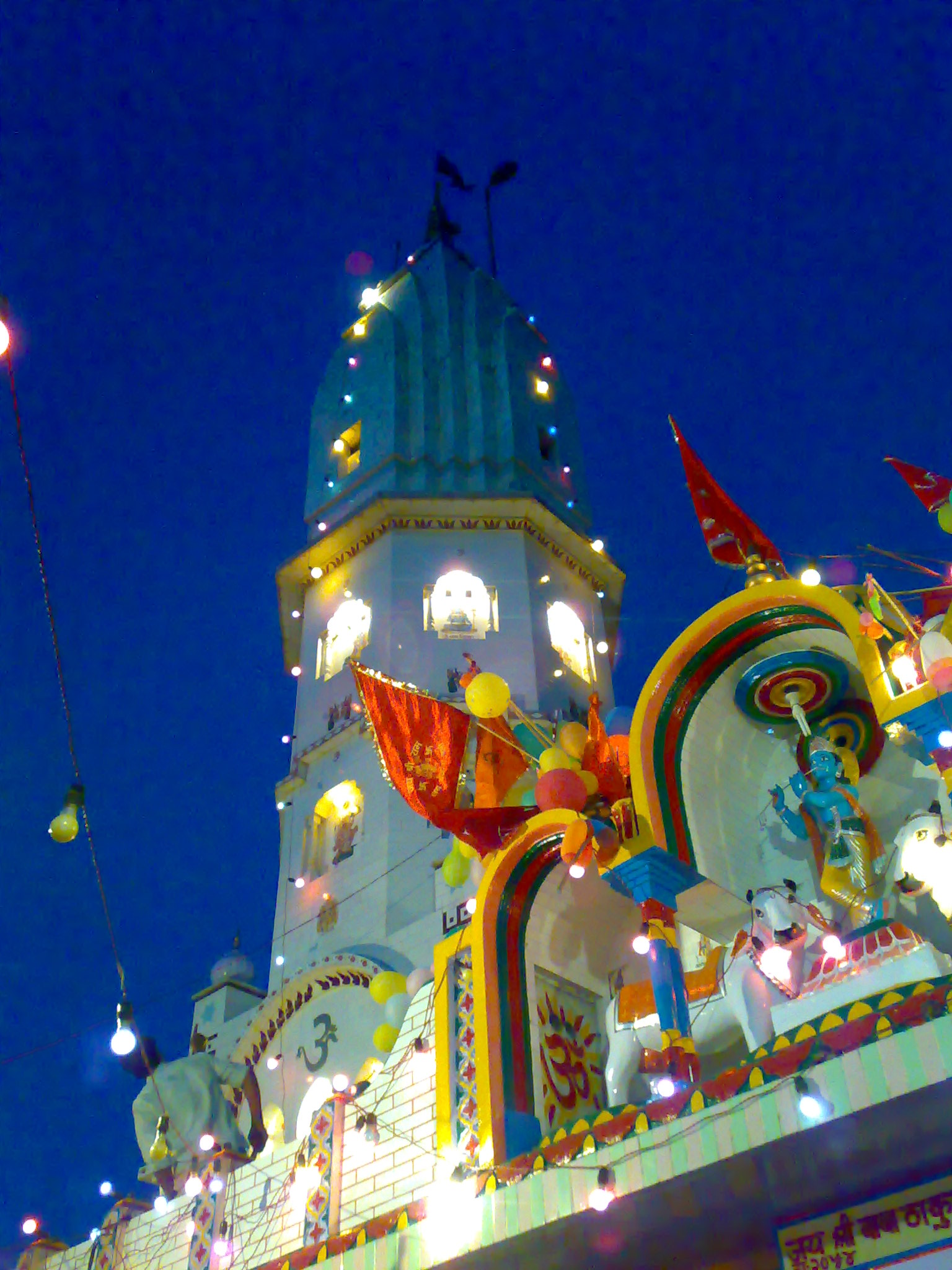
Baba Thakur Main Gate and Burz

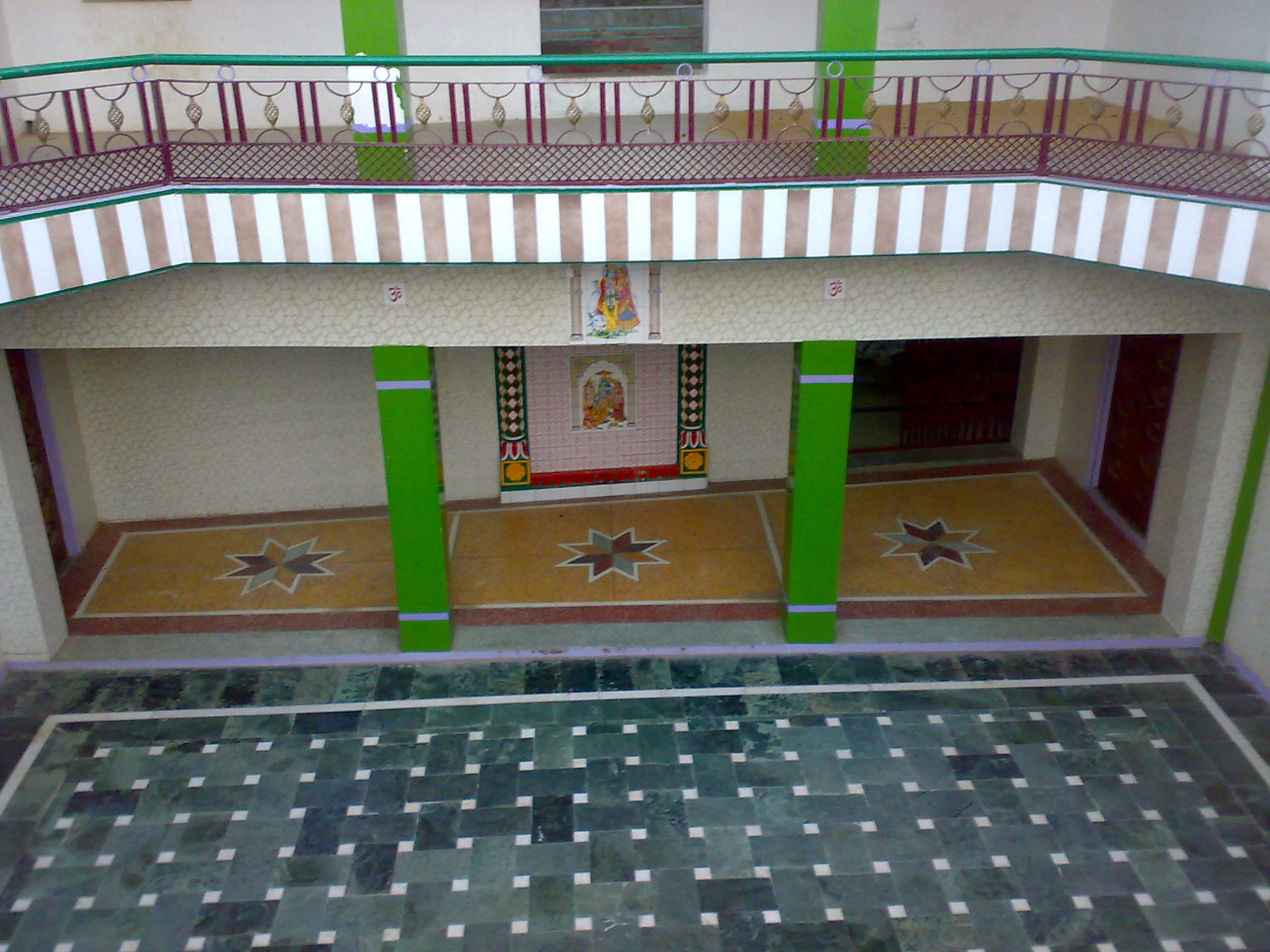
Baba Thakur Mandir Court Yard

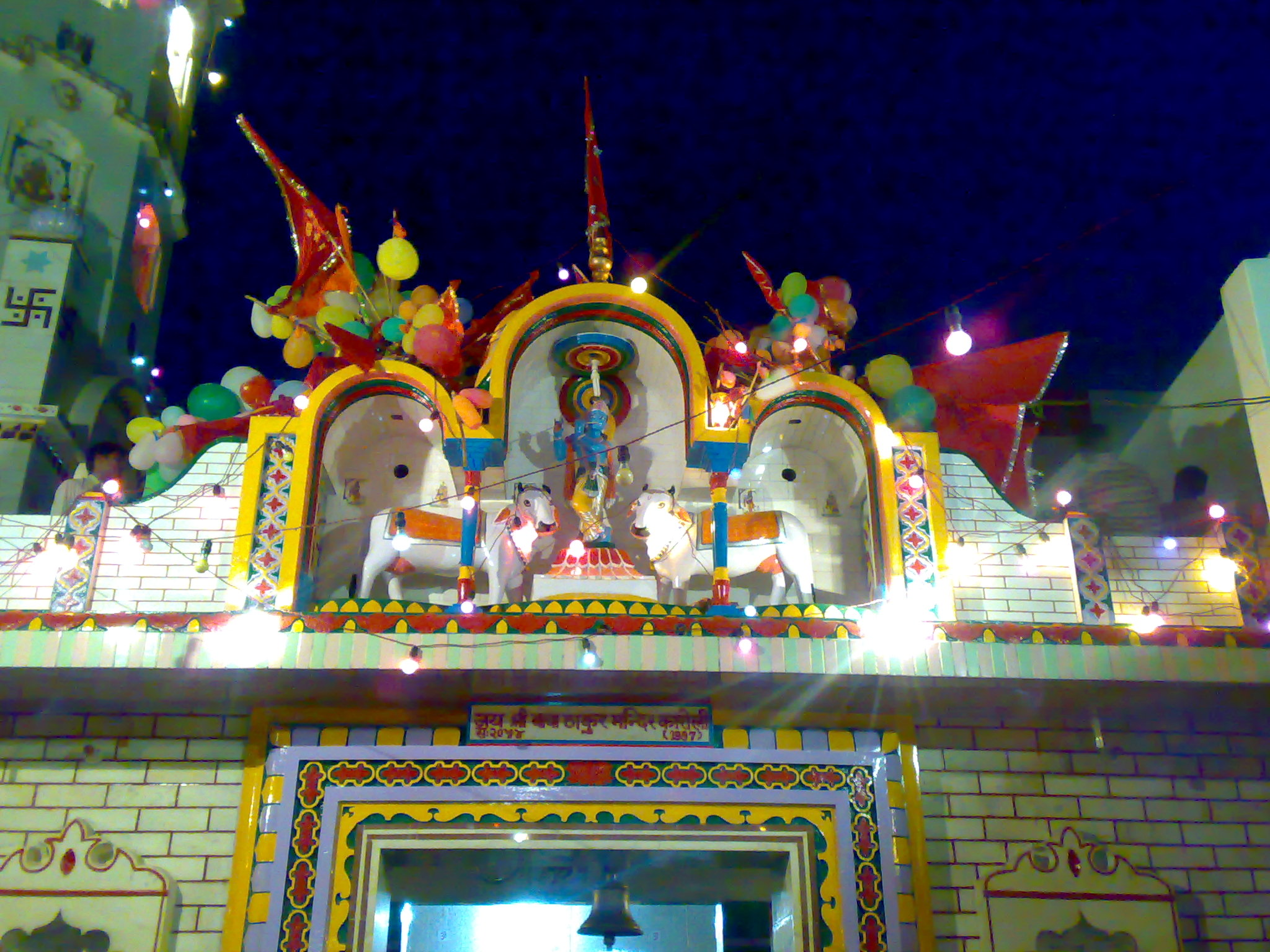
Main Gate view during the night of Holi

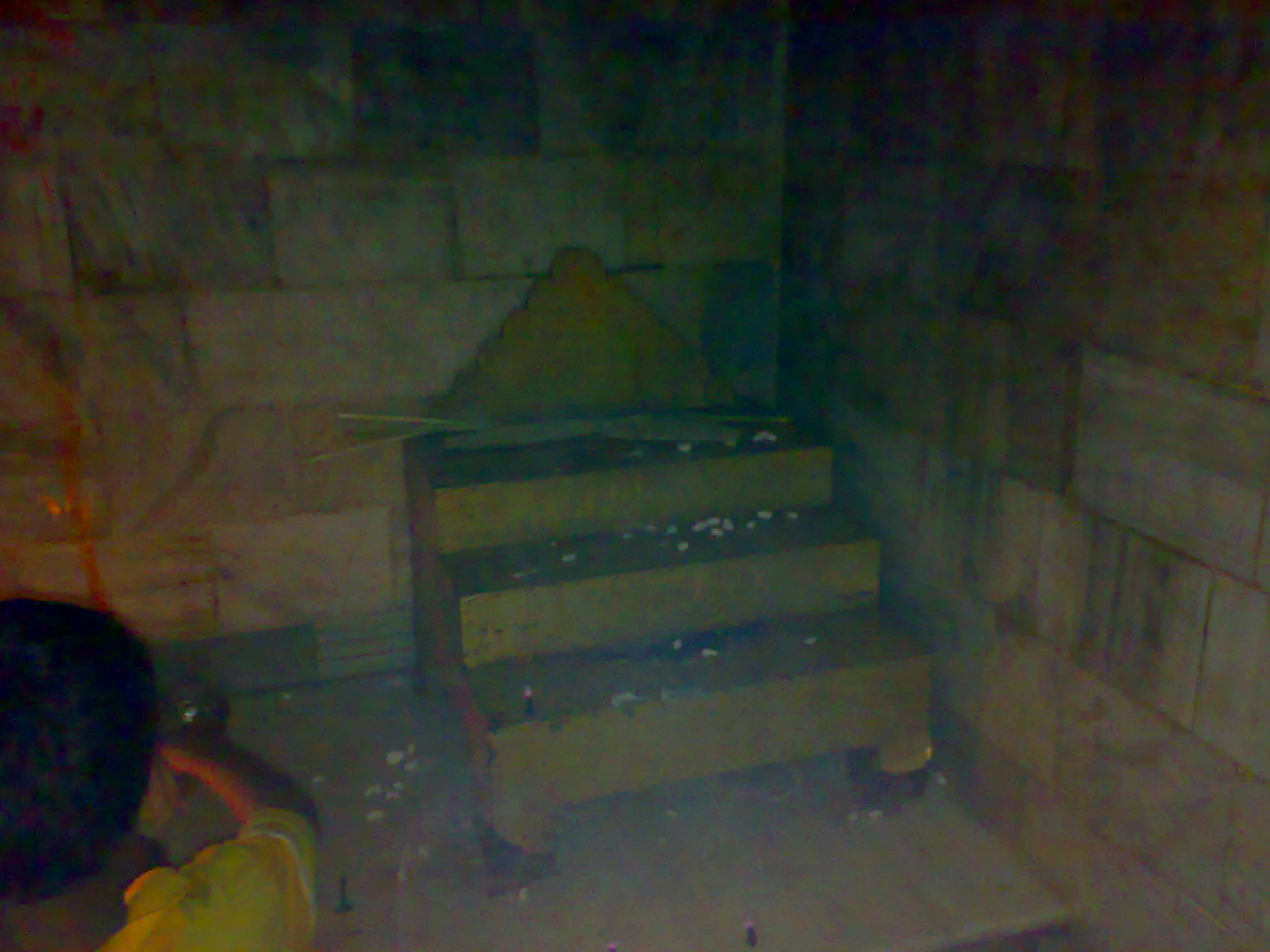
The Main Worship Place 1

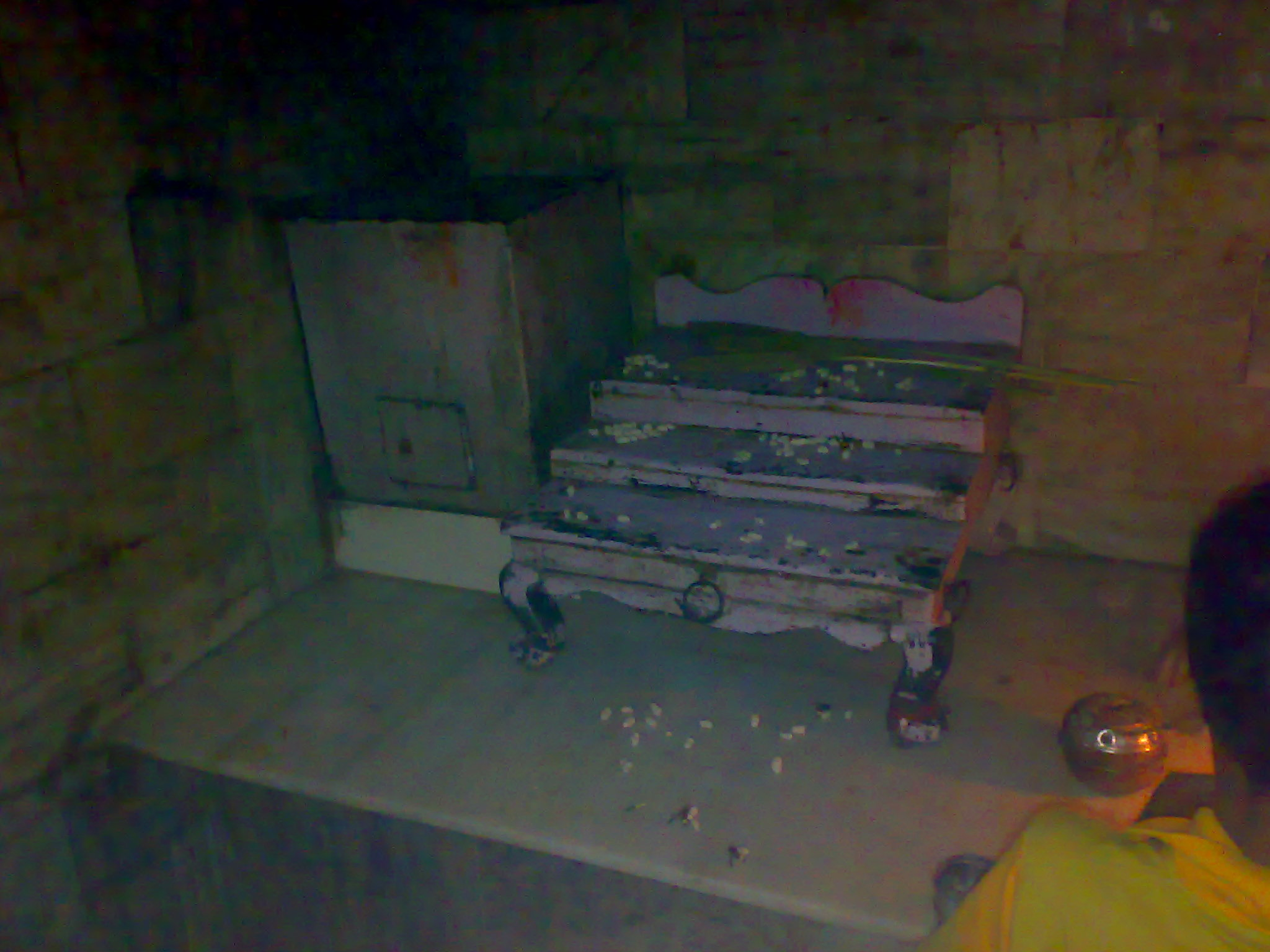
The Main Worship Place 2

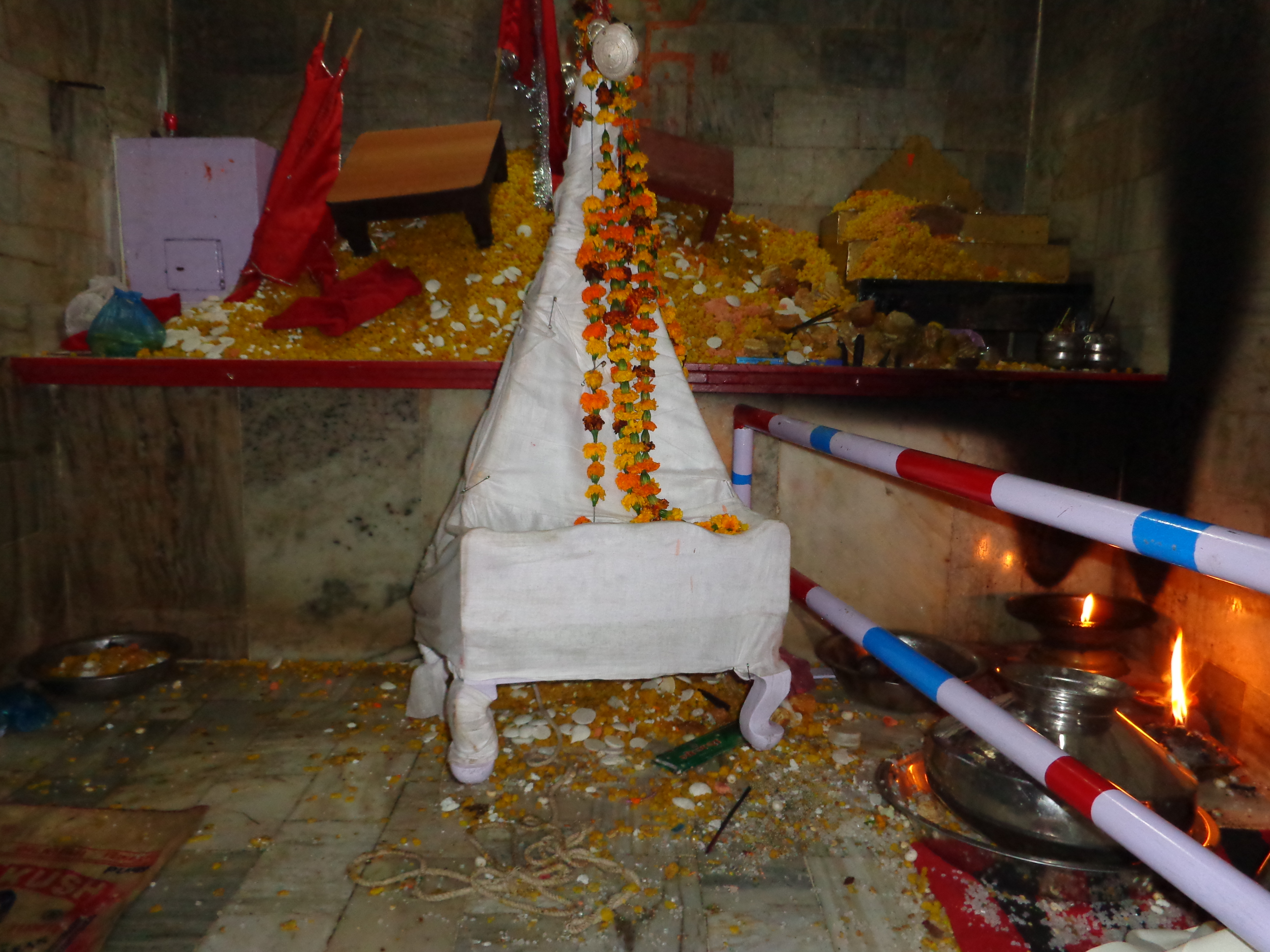
Baba Thakur Ji's hammock

== Holi 2014 ==
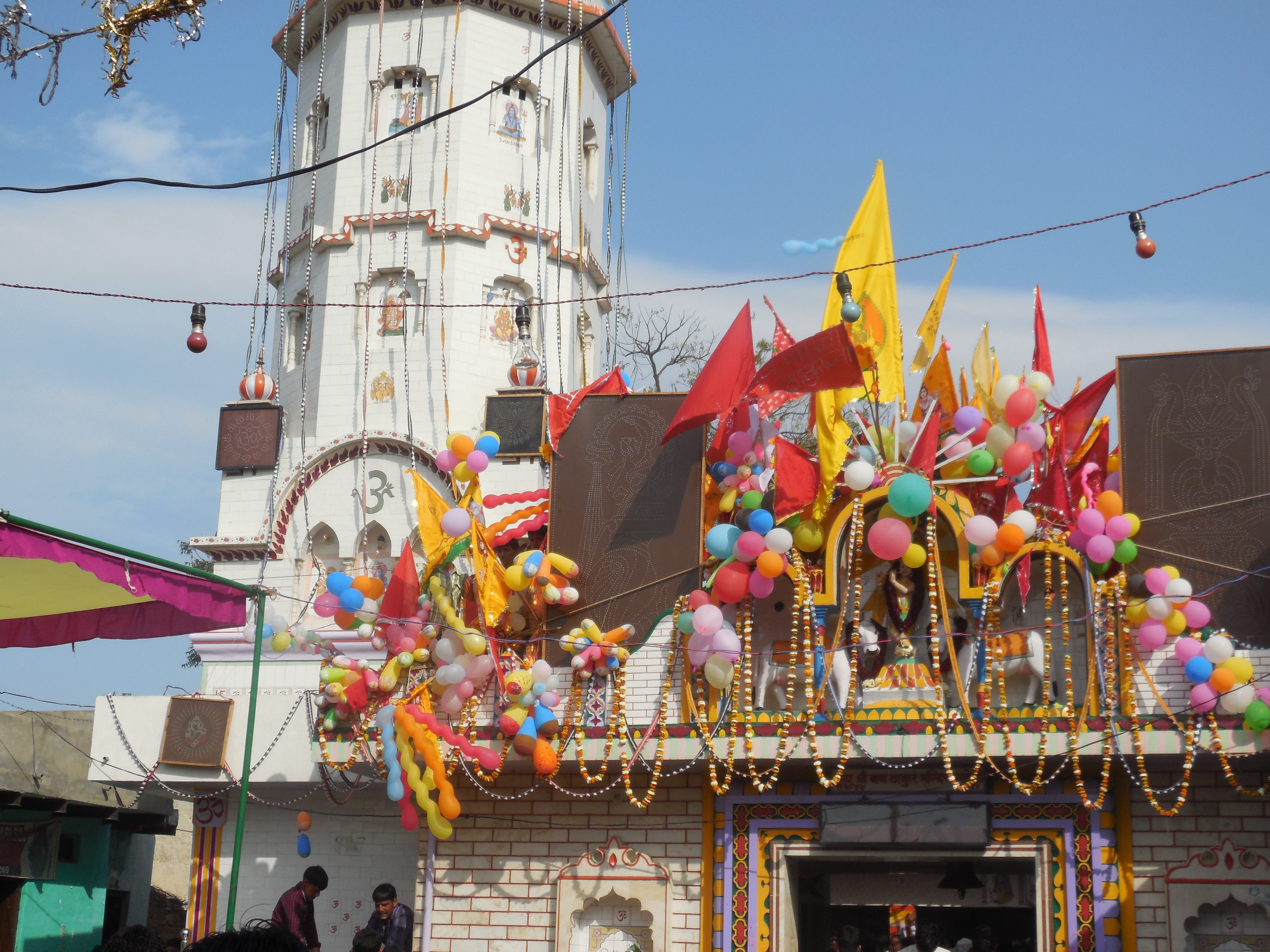
Balcony decoration (Main Gate) Holi 2014

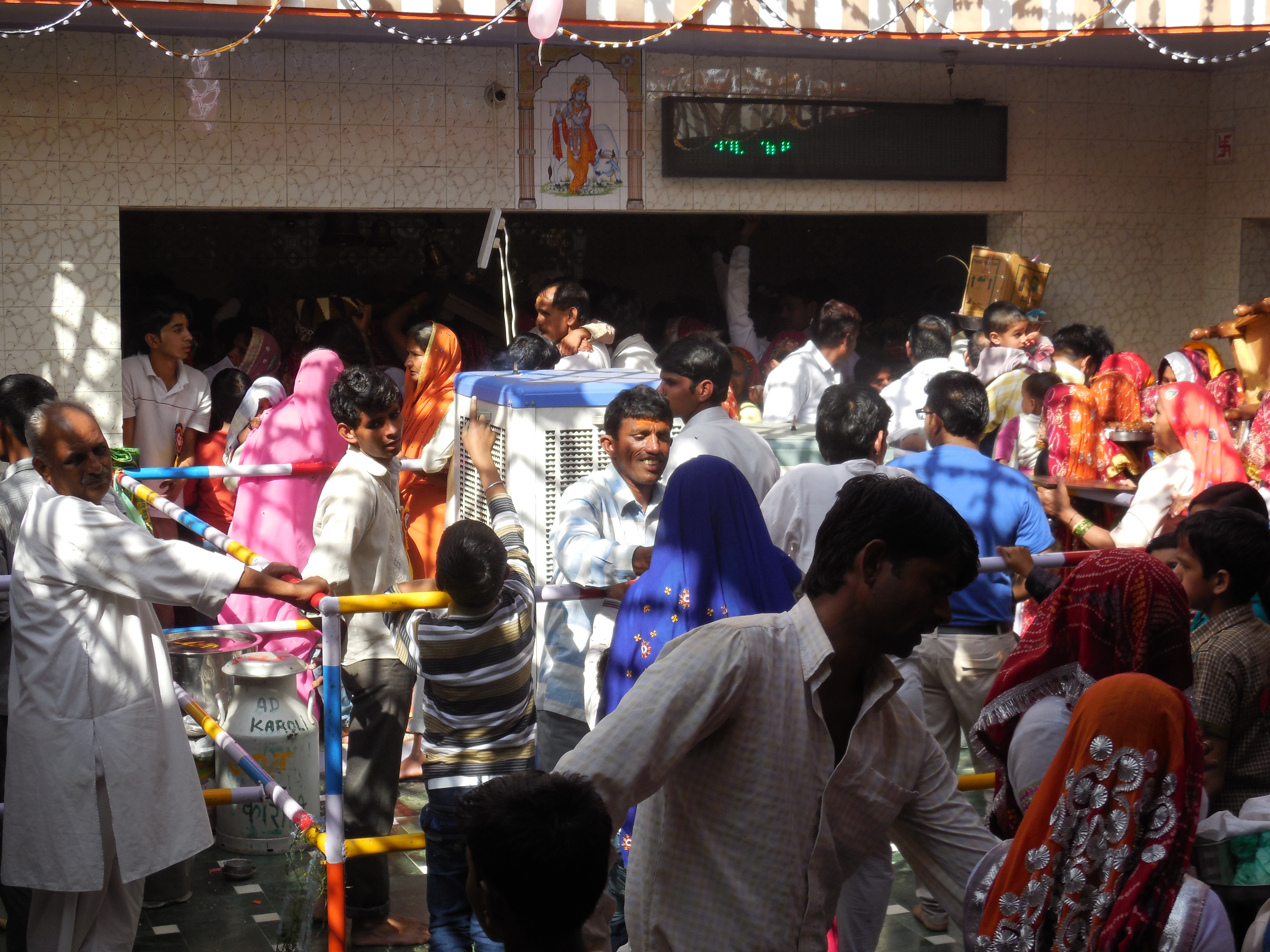
Devotees waiting in the courtyard for their turn to worship.

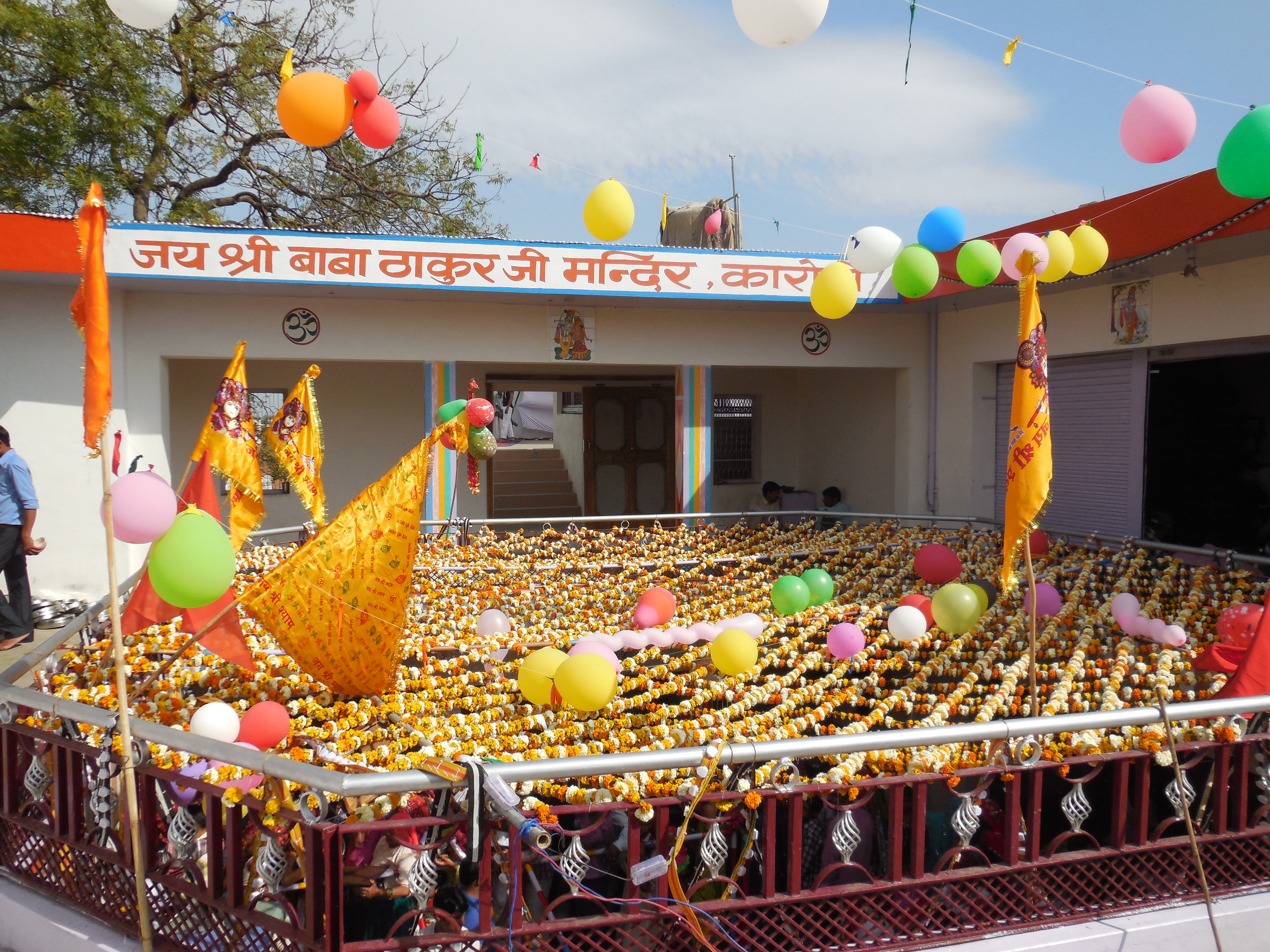
Courtyard decoration from the top

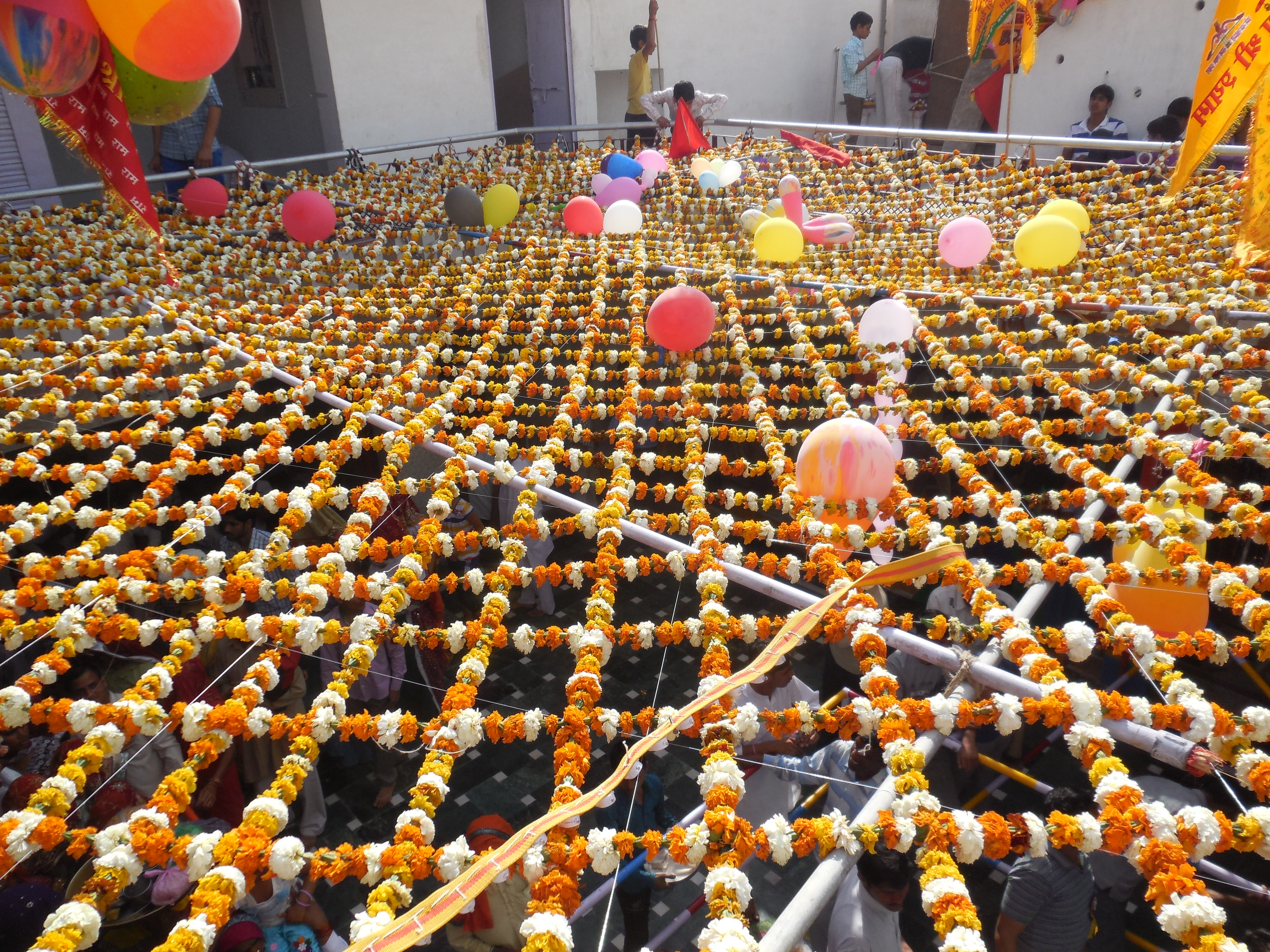
A closer view of courtyard decoration from the top

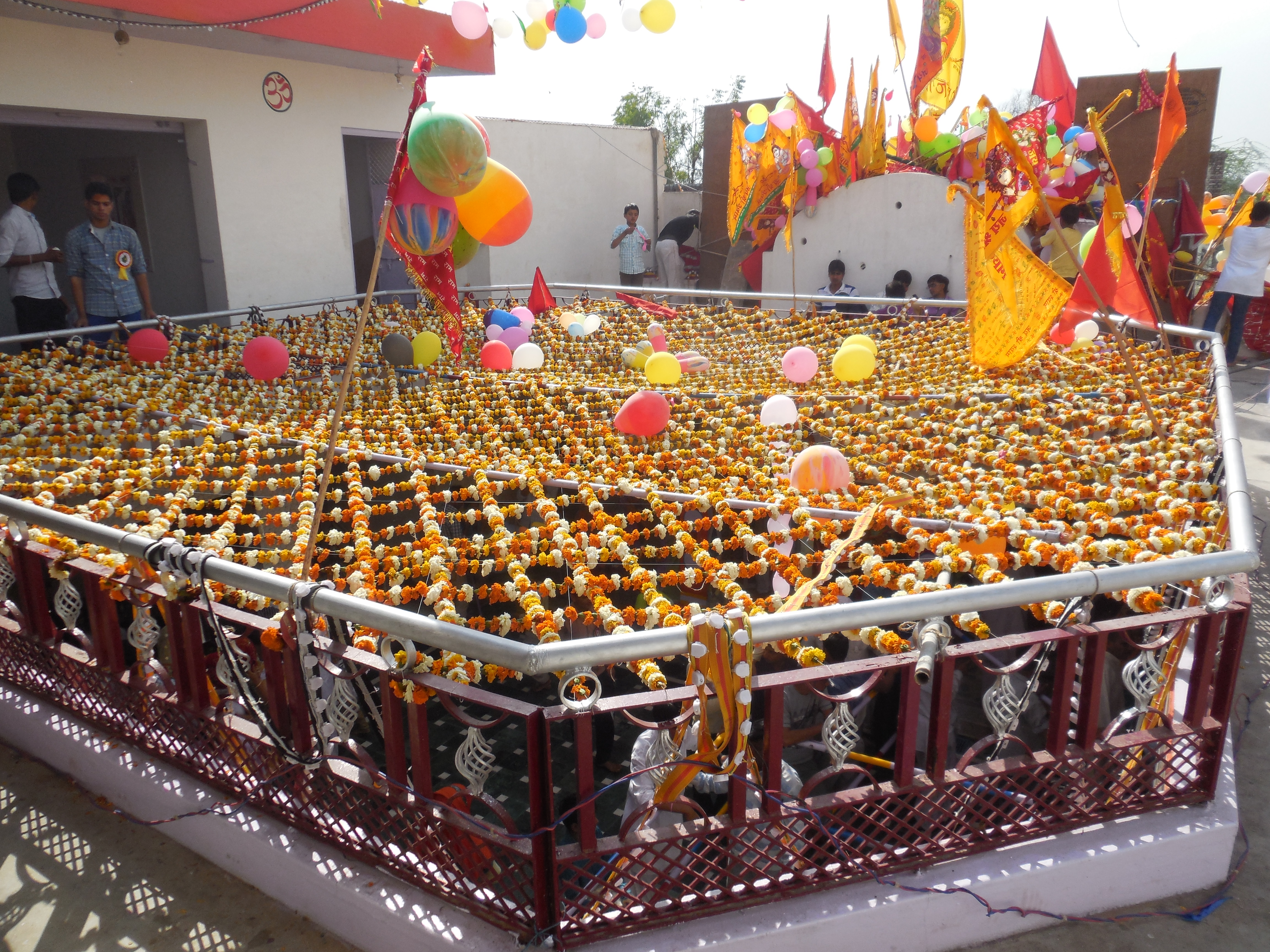
Another view of courtyard decoration from the top

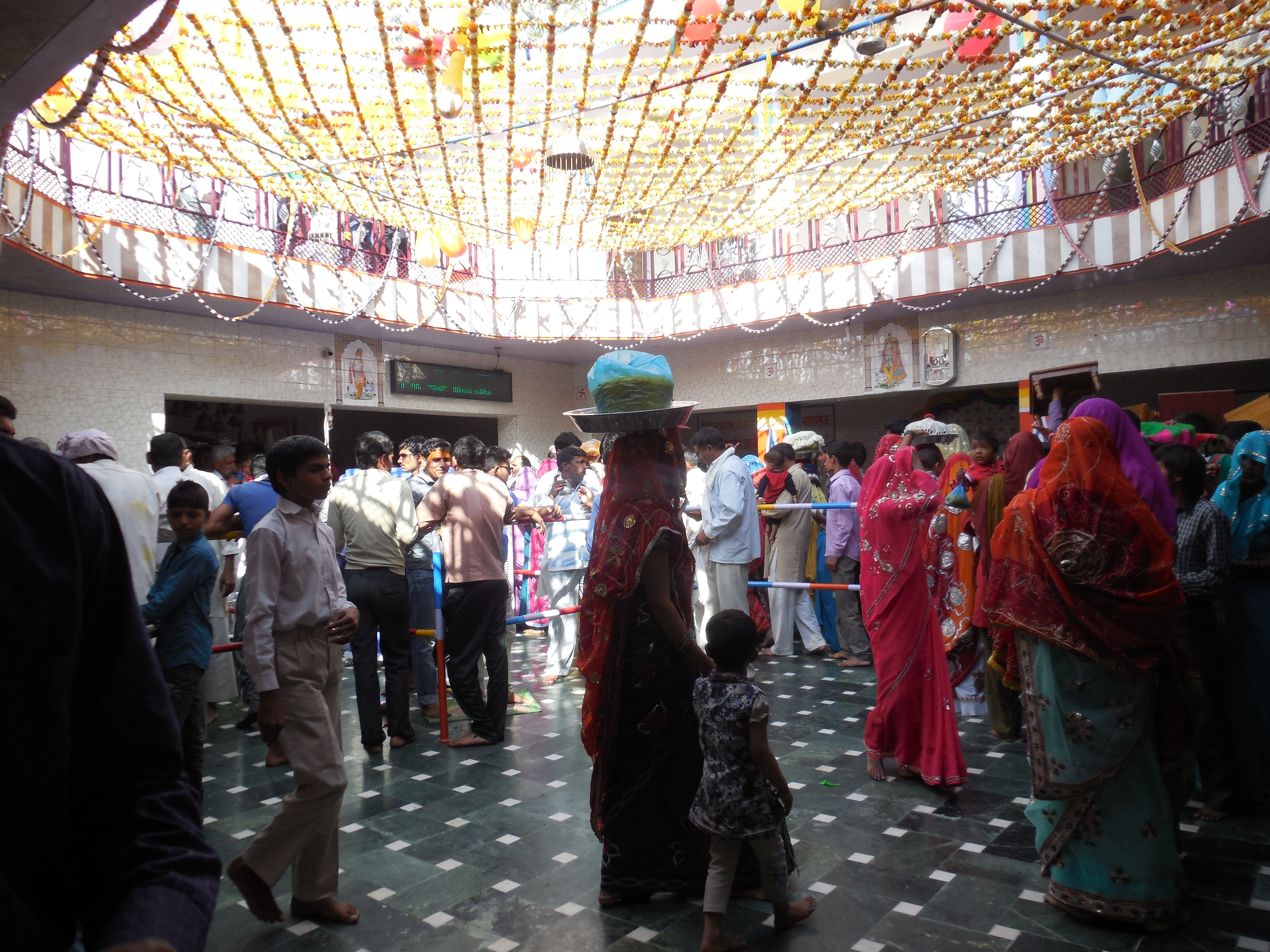
Courtyard, devotees waiting for their turn in the courtyard

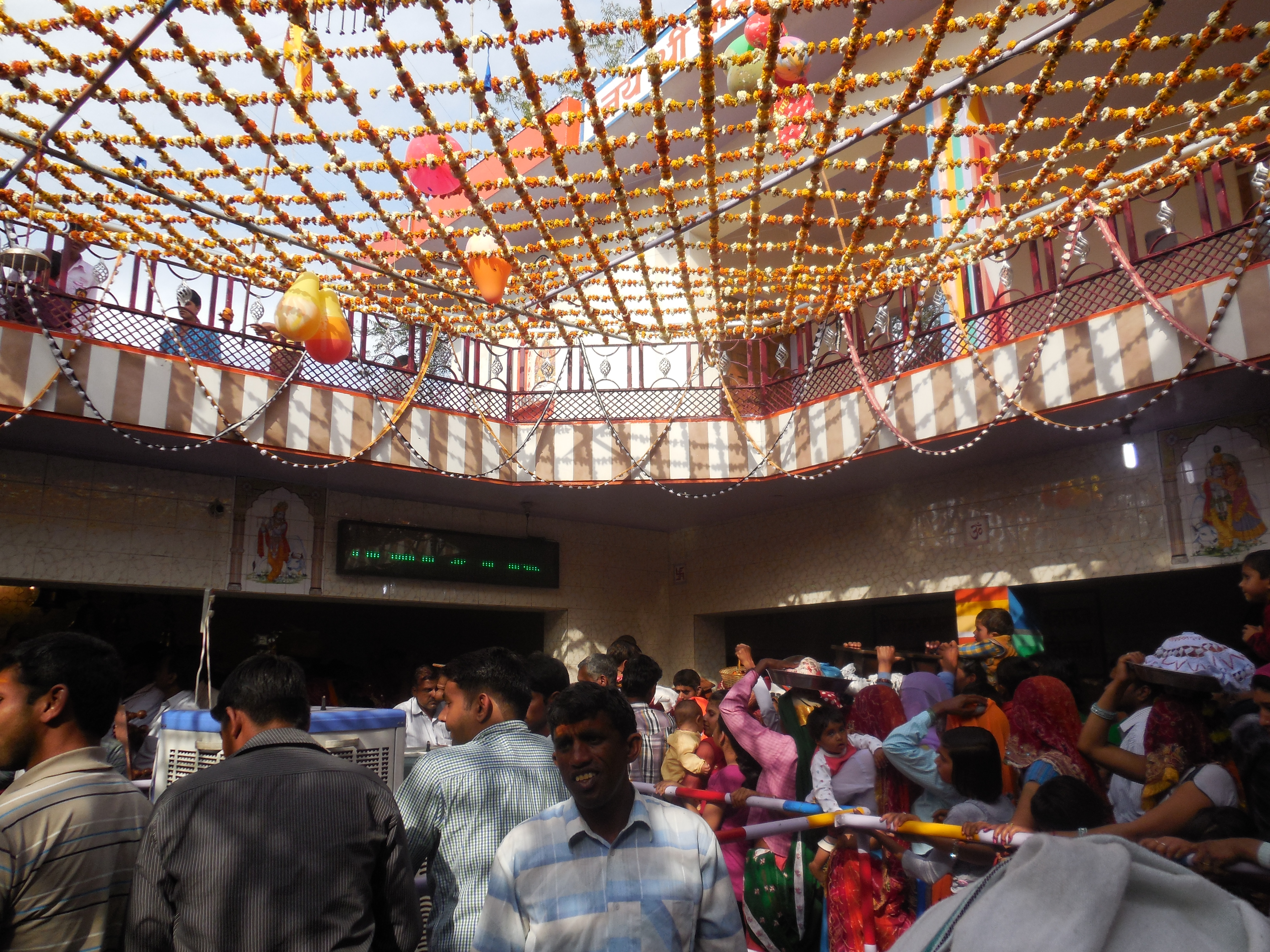
Another view of courtyard, devotees waiting for their turn

== See also ==
- Karoli, Rewari
- Lookhi
- Kosli
- Kanina khas
- Rewari
- Mahendragarh
