= Bahu-Jholri =

- village
- Location in Haryana, India Bahu-Jholri (India)
- Coordinates: 28.45°N 76.32°E
- Country: India
- State: Haryana
- District: Jhajjar

Languages
  - Official: Hindi
- Time zone: UTC+5:30 (IST)
- PIN: 124142
- Telephone code: 01259
- ISO 3166 code: IN-HR
- Vehicle registration: HR-14
- Nearest city: Kosli, Charkhi Dadri
- Literacy: 90%
- Lok Sabha constituency: Rohtak
- Vidhan Sabha constituency: Jhajjar
- Climate: Dry (Köppen)
- Website: haryana.gov.in

Bahu-Jholri is a village in Jhajjar district in the Indian state of Haryana. Bahu (Jholri) is a village situated on MDR 130 in Jhajjar district. However the word Bahu (Jholri) contains the name of two villages, one is Bahu and the other is Jholri, their names combined in the form of one name because of many Bahu villages in Haryana. These two villages are neighbour villages. A few years ago both villages were Jhajjar district, but now Bahu is in Jhajjar district and Jholri is in Rewari district. Khanpur Khurd (3 km), Jharli railway station (7 km), Khanpur Kalan (3 km), Jhamri (7 km), Mohanbari (7 km), Dhalanwas (10 km) are the nearby villages to Bahu. Bahu is surrounded by Kanina Tehsil to the south, Salhawas Tehsil to the east, and Dadri-I Tehsil to the north. This village is on the border of Jhajjar District.

The village Bahu is populated mainly by Ahir, Jaat, Thakore, Brahman and Baniya castes. The history of Bahu village is that, in this village Muslims lived for many years before the independence of India. At the time of independence when Hindustan and Pakistan were separated the Muslims moved to Pakistan by selling everything at extremely low prices.

In Bahu there is still a very big Maszid of Muslims situated near the main market and girls government school. Muslims used to come in numbers at their festivals. This village was the only village which consisted of a boys' school and a girls' school until Tenth class at that time in all nearby areas.

The district of this village was changed several times. First at the formation of Haryana state it was in Rohtak District, then it was changed to Gurgaon District, then it was changed back to Rohtak, and when Jhajjar District was formed from Rohtak it moved to Rewari District, then on the request of the villagers of village Bahu and Goriya it was moved to the Jhajjar District. This village is about 40 km from Jhajjar. Now this village is in the form of a Town and acts as a center of market for the nearby villages.

== See also ==
- Karoli, India
- Kosli
- Kanina khas
- Rewari
- Mahendragarh
