= Bawania =

- Village
- Location in Haryana, India Bawania (India)
- Coordinates: 28.256°N 76.228°E
- Country: India
- State: Haryana
- District: Mahendragarh

Government
  - Type: Democracy
  - Body: Gram Panchayat

Area
  - Total: 7.5 km^{2} (2.9 sq mi)
- Elevation: 262 m (860 ft)

Population (2011)
  - Total: 3,541
  - Density: 470/km^{2} (1,200/sq mi)

Languages
  - Official: Hindi
- Time zone: UTC+5:30 (IST)
- PIN: 123034
- ISO 3166 code: IN-HR
- Vehicle registration: HR-35
- Sex ratio: 923:1000 ♂/♀
- Website: haryana.gov.in

Bawania is a large village and Gram Panchayat located in the Mahendragarh Tehsil of Mahendragarh district in the southwestern region of Haryana, India. Positioned within the Kanina Community Development Block, it functions under the local administration of an elected Sarpanch via the Panchayati Raj framework. The settlement utilizes the Postal Index Number (PIN) 123034. The village code of Bawania is 062064.

== Geography ==
Bawania has a semi-arid climate. The bordering villages are Bachini, Gagarwas, Sundrah, Khera, Mundain, Koka, Surjanwas.

== Demography ==
Subject	Total	Male	Female
Total number of houses	699		
Population	3,541	1,841	1,700
Child (0-6)	390	236	154
Schedule Caste	415	205	210
Schedule Tribe	0	0	0
Literacy	79.91 %	92.90 %	66.43 %

== Infrastructure ==
Bawania has a post office which is also shared by nearby villages like Bachini, Gagarwas. The village has good road network and proper electrical grid connection.
