= Bishoha =

Bisoha
- village
- Location in Haryana, India Bisoha (India)
- Coordinates: 28.39°N 76.37°E
- Country: India
- State: Haryana
- District: Rewari

Languages
  - Official: Hindi
- Time zone: UTC+5:30 (IST)
- PIN: 123303
- Telephone code: 01259
- Vehicle registration: HR 43
- Nearest city: Kanina, Kosli
- Lok Sabha constituency: Rohtak
- Vidhan Sabha constituency: Kosli
- Climate: Dry (Köppen)
- Website: haryana.gov.in

Bisoha is a village situated on an approach road at a distance 1.5 km from Lookhi village on Kanina-Kosli road in Rewari district.

== Geography ==
Bishoha is located at .

== See also ==
- Villages of Rewari District

== See also ==
- Karoli
- Lookhi
- Kosli
- Kanina khas
- Rewari
- Mahendragarh
