= Dholera, Mahendragarh =

Dholera (Mahenderagarh)
- Location within Haryana Location within India
- Coordinates: 27.933284°N 76.071099°E
- Country: India
- State: Haryana
- District: Mahendragarh district
- Municipality: Mahendragarh

Population (2011)
  - Total: 3,424
- Postal code: 123 023
- Website: www.mahendragarh.gov.in

Dholera is a village in the Mahendergarh district of Haryana, India. The Dholera Sarpanch seat is Unreserved.

== Adjacent villages ==
- Nangal Shyalu
- Nangal Pipa
- Nangal Nunia
- Nangal Kalia
- Nangal Dargu
- Nangal Chaudhary
- Nangal Soda
- Nizampur, Mahendragarh

== Demographics of 2011 ==
As of 2011 India census, Dholera (Mahendragarh) had a population of 3424 with a total of 665 households. Males (1833) constitute 53.53% of the population and females (1591) 46.46%. Dholera has an average literacy (2263) rate of 66.09%, which is lower than the national average of 74%: male literacy (1407) is 62.17%, and female literacy (856) is 37.82% of total literates(2263). In Dholera, 10.77% of the population is under 6 years of age (369).
