= Kotia, Haryana =

Kotia
- Village
- Location in Haryana, India Kotia (India)
- Coordinates: 28.20°N 76.20°E
- Country: India
- State: Haryana
- District: Mahendergarh

Government
  - Type: Democratic

Area
  - Total: 3 km^{2} (1.2 sq mi)

Population (2011)
  - Total: 2,996
  - Density: 1,000/km^{2} (2,600/sq mi)

Languages
  - Official: Hindi
- Time zone: UTC+5:30 (IST)
- PIN: 123027
- Telephone code: 01285
- ISO 3166 code: IN-HR
- Vehicle registration: HR 82
- Tehsil: Kanina
- Lok Sabha constituency: Mahendragarh
- Assembly constituency: Ateli
- Climate: Dry
- Website: haryana.gov.in

Kotia is a village located in Kanina tehsil, district Mahendragarh, Haryana state of India. It is on the Kosli–Kanina road and is 17 kilometres from Kosli and 3 kilometres from Kanina.

The village has a Government school up to Middle Class with a certain playground for villagers. Medical facilities are available in Kanina city. Presenty Sarpanch is Shri Dharamvir Singh Since November 2022. Baba Burjeshwar is the village saint. A mandir is made in memory of Baba Ji that is called Chithoda wala Baba. The population of the village is more than 2996 in which 52% males and 48% females, about 58% are the youngers below age 35, 28% are adults age between 35 and 60, and 14% are senior above age 60. It a village from which about 38.61% person are in Defence. Most people are involved in agricultural activities to earn.

== Geography ==
Kotia is the last village of Mahendergarh District of North-East side and surrounded by villages in East Lishan 3 km, In South Karira 0.5 km, in South West Kanina 3 km and in North Karoli village area 3 km.

== Transport ==
Delhi Airport is about 116 km from Kotia (Via-Rewari). The drive is about 2 1/2 hours from the airport to Kotia by access-controlled eight-lane Delhi-Gurgaon expressway, four-lane NH 8 (Gurgaon-Jaipur highway), and then State Highway 24(passed from Kanina Town). State highways 24 and 22 connect Kotia to all major towns in Haryana and adjacent districts of Rajasthan.

Kotia is connected to Rewari by a state highway which is a major junction on the Indian Railway Network. Five railway lines connect the highway to Delhi (82 km away) and Ahmedabad on the major North-West trunk route, Bhiwani and Hissar towards Punjab, Bikaner via Kanina-Loharu-Sadulpur-Churu, Ajmer via Alwar and Jaipur, and Ajmer via Ringas. The sixth railway line is connected Rewari to Jhajjhar and Rohtak. The seventh railway line connecting Rewari to Palwal and Khurja has been under planning for over two decades but not approved for construction (as in September 2010).

Kotia is just 3 km from near by Railway station Kanina on Rewari-Luharu-Sadulpur-Bikaner Railway line and 15 km from the Railway Station Kosli on Rewari-Bhiwani-Hissar-Sirsa railway line. Both of the stations (Kanina & Kosli) are connected to DELHI via Rewari.

== Education ==
Kotia has three schools (one government and Two private). Kanina, a nearby town, has a number of schools and colleges. One of the colleges are named the PKSD Government College. The college being the closest to Kanina. A Unique Central university of haryana is also there in jant-pali near Mahendragarh(18 km).

== See also ==
- Karoli
- Kanina khas
- Rewari
- Mahendragarh
