= Jhook =

- Location within Haryana Location within India
- Coordinates: 28.315679°N 76.179823°E
- Country: India

Government
  - Body: Village panchayat
- Time zone: UTC+5:30 (IST)
- PIN: 123029
- Website: www.mahendragarh.gov.in

Jhook is a village in Mahendragarh Tehsil in Mahendragarh District of Haryana State, India. It belongs to Gurgaon Division. It is located 37.0 kilometres (23.0 mi) north of the district headquarters at Narnaul and 7.0 kilometres (4.3 mi) from Mahendragarh, its postal head office. It is near to Rewari-Kanina- Mahendergarh road on approach road.
