= Bighopur =

Bigopur
- township
- Location within Haryana Location within India
- Coordinates: 27.938555°N 76.058974°E
- Country: India
- State: Haryana
- District: Mahendragarh district
- Municipality: Mahendragarh

Population (2011)
  - Total: 2,228
- Postal code: 123 xxx
- Website: www.mahendragarh.gov.in

Bigopur is a village in the Mahendergarh district of Haryana, India. It is near to Rajasthan border.

== Demographics of 2011 ==
As of 2011 India census, Bigopur had a population of 2228 in 420 households. Males (1180) constitute 52.96% of the population and females (1048) 47.03%. Bigopur has an average literacy (1531) rate of 68.71%, less than the national average of 74%: male literacy (927) is 60.54%, and female literacy (604) is 39.45% of total literates(1531). In Bigopur, 10.95% of the population is under 6 years of age (244).

== Crusher Zone ==
Stone crusher zone is specified by the Haryana Government and environment clearance is needed for the same.

== Railway Station ==
Nizampur is the nearest railway station near to Bigopur and it is 6 km from Bigopur.
