= Karoli, Rewari =

Karoli
- village
- Location in Haryana, India Karoli (India)
- Coordinates: 28.385°N 76.337°E
- Country: India
- State: Haryana
- District: Rewari

Population
  - Total: 3,628

Languages
  - Official: Hindi
- Time zone: UTC+5:30 (IST)
- PIN: 123303
- Telephone code: 01259
- ISO 3166 code: IN-HR
- Vehicle registration: HR43
- Nearest city: Kanina, Kosli
- Sex ratio: 1000:941 ♂/♀
- Literacy: 79.83%
- Lok Sabha constituency: Rohtak
- Vidhan Sabha constituency: Kosli
- Climate: Dry (Köppen)
- Website: haryana.gov.in

Karoli is a village located in Kosli Tehsil, Rewari District, Haryana, India. It is on the 1.5-kilometre approach road boarded to Bahu-Jholri on the Kosli–Kanina road and is 12 kilometres from Kosli and 7 kilometres from Kanina. The villages is 125 kilometres from Delhi, the capital of India. It is a large village with an approximate population of 5,000 to 5,500. There is an average of one person in the army from each family. Smt. Kamala Devi is second ladies sarpanch of the village after Smt. Bhoori Devi. There are numerous temples in the village, of which that of Baba Thakur Ji and Baba Lal Das Hanuman Mandir has a special importance. All the villagers used to have dinner in the temple on Holi (The Indian festival). The village school was earlier up to class 10 and due to excellent results in the entire district, the school has been upgraded to Senior Secondary School. The village was the birthplace of Hari Ram Arya, the Chairman of Haryana Azad Hind Fouj who participated in the Indian Independence Movement.

== Geography ==
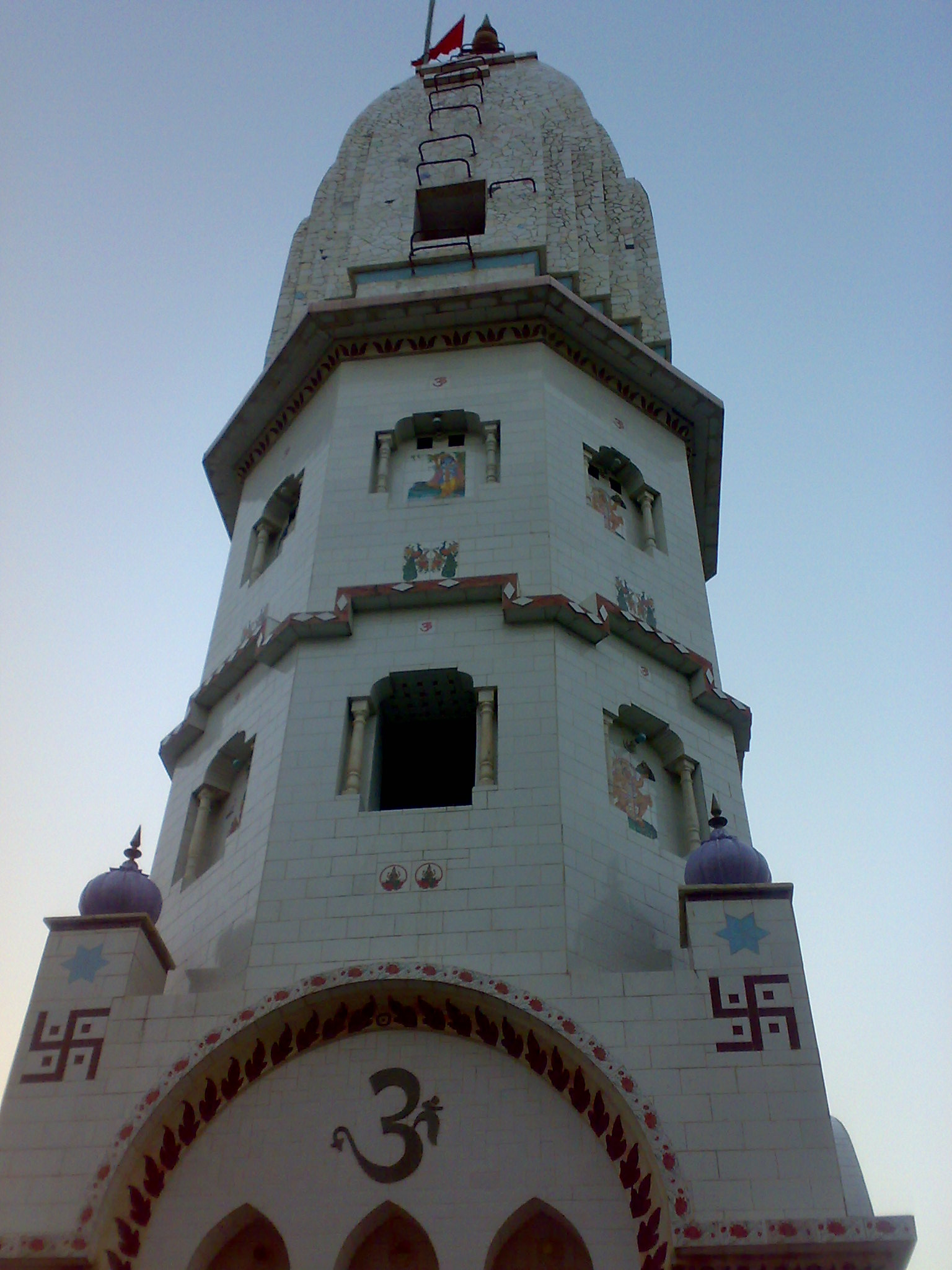
Baba Thakur Mandir Burz

Karoli has an average elevation of 245 metres (804 ft). It borders Lookhi, Bishoha, Bawwa, Gahra, Kotia and Lisan villages.

The temperature can go as high as 46.5 degrees Celsius from May to July. Winter is from November to February, and the temperature can fall to 5 degrees Celsius in December and January. The village is adjacent to the Mahindergarh district and has dust storms in summer. Rugged hilly terrain of the Aravali ranges as well as sandy dunes are found in nearby villages.

The overall climate is dry – rain falls from July to September; little rain is experienced during winter.

== Demographics ==
Karoli village has a population of 3,628. Males constitute 52% of the population and females 48%. Karoli has an average literacy rate of 80%, higher than the national average of 59.5% (Male literacy is 93% and female literacy is 66%). 13% of the population is under 6 years of age in the village.

Karoli is a part of Ahirwal, the land of Ahirs. Ahirwal includes Mahendragarh–Narnaul area and Alwar, which also have a large population of Ahirs (Yadavs). The adjacent districts of Mahendragarh and Alwar have Yadav-majority populations. Other castes in the village are Brahmin, Kumhar, Chamar, Dhanak, Swamy (Bairagi), Khati and Nai.

== Transport ==
Delhi airport is about 120 km from Karoli (Via-Rewari). It is a three hour drive from the airport to Karoli by access-controlled eight-lane Delhi-Gurgaon expressway, four-lane NH 8 (Gurgaon-Jaipur highway) and then Rewari-Kanina State Highway. State highways connect Karoli to all major towns in Haryana and adjacent districts of Rajasthan.

Karoli is connected to Rewari by a state highway which is a major junction on Indian Railways network. Five railway lines connect it to Delhi and Ahmedabad on the major north-west trunk route, Bhiwani and Hissar towards Punjab, Bikaner via Kanina-Mahendragarh-Loharu-Sadulpur-Churu, Ajmer via Alwar and Jaipur, and Ajmer via Ringas. A sixth railway line is being built to connect Rewari to Jhajjhar and Rohtak. The seventh railway line connecting Rewari to Palwal and Khurja has been under planning for over two decades but not approved for construction (as of September 2010).

Karoli is just 9 km from near by railway station Kanina on Rewari-Luharu-Sadulpur-Bikaner Railway line and 13 km from the Railway Station Kosli on Rewari-Bhiwani-Hissar-Sirsa railway line. Both of the stations (Kanina and Kosli) are connected to Delhi via Rewari.

== Education ==
Karoli has three schools (two government and one private) and one college (private). Nearby towns of Kanina and Kosli has a number of schools and two colleges in each town. A government college in Nahar is the nearest and another is Pksd gc Kanina. Ahir College, Kishanlal Public College and several private colleges have been also set up in Rewari (40 km) and Mahendregarh (25 km) districts.

== Politics ==
The village follows the panchayati raj system of the Indian Constitution and a selected and independent panchayat is there to establish law and order. The village is organized into 12 wards which constitute the panchayat.

The list of the sarpanch from 1953 and after now-

Till Date sarpanch-

Nº	Name	Year	For the period
1	Sh. Kundan Pandit	1953	5 Years
2	Sh. Raghunaath Pandit		5 Years
3	Sh. Bed Prakash		5 Years
4	Sh. Bed Prakash		7 Years
5	Sh. Juglal		5 Years
6	Sh. Shyokaran		5 Years
7	Sh. Ravi Prakash		3.5 Years
8	Sh. Ravi Prakash		5 Years
9	Sh. Ravi Prakash		3 Years
10	Sh. Ishwar Singh Yadav		6 Months
11	Sh. Ravi Prakash		1.3 Year
12	Smt. Bhoori Devi	2000–2005	5 Years
13	Sh. Jhuthar Yadav	2005–2010	5 Years
14	Smt. Kamla Devi	2010–2015	5 Years
15	Sh. Rampal Punia	Jan'16–Nov'22	6 Years
16	Smt. Sharmila	Nov'22–Present	till date

Current Panchayat-

Smt. Sharmila(sarpanch)
Ward No	Name of panch
1	Mahesh Yadav
2	Anita Yadav
3	Vijay Singh
4	Koyal
5	Sharmila
6	Mahesh Dutt
7	Sushma Devi
8	Bir Singh
9	Dolly Devi
10	Rajkumar
11	Rajesh
12	Rajesh

== Notable people ==
- Lt. Hari Ram Arya Freedom Fighter and ex-chairman of Haryana Sawtantrta Senani Samman Samiti, Chandigarh. He was also a founding member of the Dujana Rajya Prajamandal Movement and the founding member of Babu Bal Mukund Gupt Sahitya Sanrakhsan Samiti. He was also elected president of the All India Freedom Fighters Organization. He has been active in the field of social service and political movements since 1939. He actively participated in faridkot Satayagrah under the leadership of Nehru ji. He has experience working with leaders like Pt. Nehru, Babu Vrissh Bhan, Ch. Ranveer Singh, and Gyani Jail Singh ji.

== Gallery ==
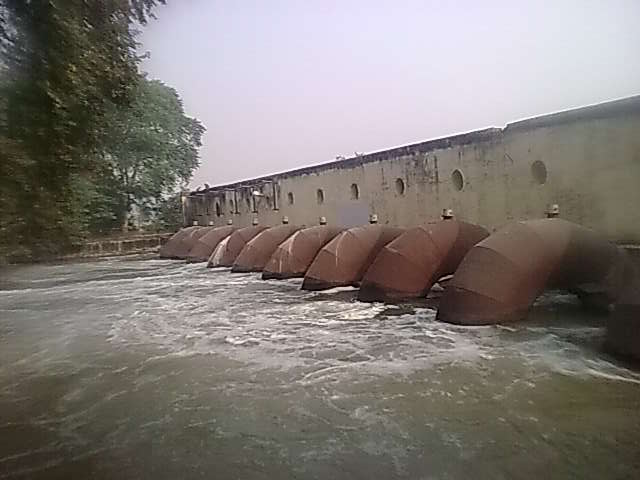
Pump House on Canal

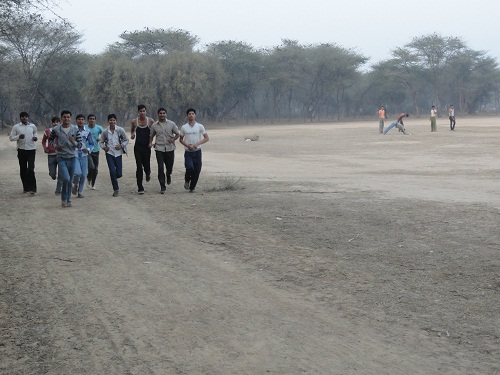
Playground

Dance on Tabla by Manohar Singh

== See also ==
- Kotia
- Gahra
- Bawwa
- Lookhi
- Kosli
- Kanina khas
- Rewari
- Mahendragarh
