= Bhuriawas =

Bhuriawas is a village in Nahar Block of Rewari in Haryana. It is situated on Palhawas-Gudiani-Kosli road. It is one km from Gudianai towards Palhawas. It has a small mountain.
