= Palh, Mahendragarh =

Coordinates: 28°11′06″N 76°06′32″E

Palh is a village in Mahendragarh tehsil, Mahendragarh district, Haryana state, India.
