= Bachini (village) =

- Village
- Location in Haryana, India Bachini (India)
- Coordinates: 28.268°N 76.232°E
- Country: India
- State: Haryana
- District: Mahendragarh

Government
  - Type: Democracy
  - Body: Gram Panchayat

Area
  - Total: 3.26 km^{2} (1.26 sq mi)
- Elevation: 264 m (866 ft)

Population (2011)
  - Total: 1,801
  - Density: 552/km^{2} (1,430/sq mi)

Languages
  - Official: Hindi
- Time zone: UTC+5:30 (IST)
- PIN: 123034
- ISO 3166 code: IN-HR
- Vehicle registration: HR-35
- Sex ratio: 963:838 ♂/♀
- Website: haryana.gov.in

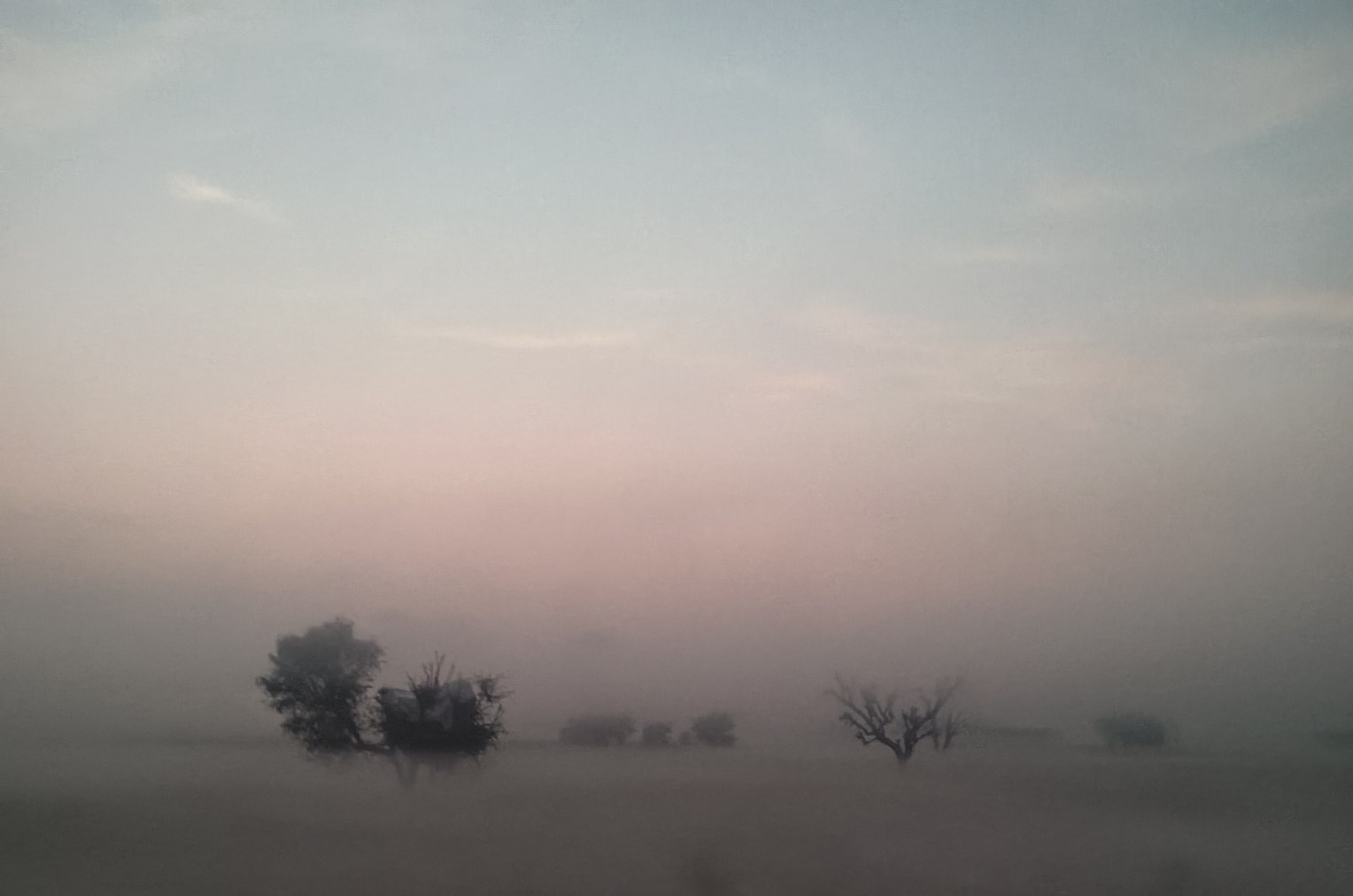

Bachini is a village and Gram Panchayat located in the Mahendragarh Tehsil of Mahendragarh district in the southwestern region of Haryana, India. Positioned within the Kanina Community Development (CD) Block, it functions under the local administration of an elected Sarpanch via the Panchayati Raj framework. Current Sarpanch of the village is Sanjeeta. The settlement is indexed under the Government of India’s Census Location Code 062067 and utilizes the Postal Index Number (PIN) 123034.

== Geography ==
Bachini at 264 metres above mean sea level has an area of 326 hectares (3.26 km²), it is a part of Trans-Gangetic Plains with semi-arid climate. The climate is characterized by extreme temperature variations between seasons, with a low average annual monsoon rainfall of approximately 522 mm.The village's agriculture relies extensively on groundwater fed tubewell. Due to which Bachini is designated as a critical monitoring zone under the national Atal Bhujal Yojana water conservation program. Bachini shares its boundaries with farmlands of neighbouring villages, including Bawania, Gagarwas, Rasulpur, Koka, and Akbarpur Nangal. It is located 12 kilometres east of the sub-district headquarters and police jurisdiction at Mahendragarh, and 15 kilometres from the Kanina block development cluster.

== Demography ==
Subject	Total	Male	Female
Total number of houses	357		
Population	1,801	963	838
Children (0-6)	200	116	84
Schedule Caste	522	279	243
Schedule Tribe	0	0	0
Literacy	79.51 %	92.09 %	65.38 %

The village has 1,801 residents residing across 357 households comprising 963 males and 838 females.The Scheduled Caste (SC) population is 522, constituting 28.98% of the total village populace.It has complete of Hindu population. Bachini's literacy rate is 79.51% with male literacy of 92.09% (745 individuals) and female literacy of 65.38% (516 individuals). Most of the population uses agriculture for their incomes.

== Infrastructure ==
Bachini is connected to nearby villages, tehsil and district headquarters through metalled roads. The village has an elementary government school, an Anganwadi, one major temple and good electricity linkage to the electricity grid.
