= Janjariawas =

Janjriawas is a village in Mahendragarh district in the north Indian state of Haryana. It is 7 km from Mahendragarh and 3 km from sher sa suri marg. It has approximately 350 house of 1080 population.
