= Khatodra =

Village in Mahendragarh, Haryana, India

Khatodra is a small village in Mahendragarh District in Haryana, India. It is located 5 km away in south of the city on State Highway 24.
