= Majra Khurd, Mahendragarh =

Majra Khurd is a village in Mahendragarh district in Haryana state in northern India.
