= Bhakli =

Bhakli Sundar Nagar
- Village
- Location in Haryana, India Bhakli (India)
- Coordinates: 28.411101°N 76.466904°E
- Country: India
- State: Haryana
- District: Rewari
- Founder: Baba Johad vala

Languages
  - Official: Hindi
- Time zone: UTC+5:30 (IST)
- PIN: 123302
- ISO 3166 code: IN-HR
- Vehicle registration: HR – 43
- Sex ratio: 57:43 ♂/♀

Bhakli is a village in the Kosli sub-division of Rewari district of Haryana in India. It is situated 80 kilometers from Delhi.

== Adjacent villages ==
- Juddi
- Dhania
- naya gaon
- kosli
- chavva
- Amboli
- Salawas
- Nathera
