= Nathera =

- village
- Location in Haryana, India Nathera (India)
- Coordinates: 28.20°N 76.20°E
- Country: India
- State: Haryana
- District: Rewari

Government
  - Type: panchayat

Area
  - Total: 4 km^{2} (1.5 sq mi)

Population (2011)
  - Total: 2,000
  - Density: 500/km^{2} (1,300/sq mi)

Languages
  - Official: Hindi
- Time zone: UTC+5:30 (IST)
- PIN: 123302
- Telephone code: 01259
- ISO 3166 code: IN-HR
- Vehicle registration: HR 43
- Nearest city: Kosli
- Lok Sabha constituency: Rohtak
- Vidhan Sabha constituency: Kosli
- Climate: Dry
- Website: haryana.gov.in

Nathera is a village in Kosli Tehsil in Rewari district of Haryana State, India. It belongs to Gurgaon Division. It is located 31 km to the north of District headquarters Rewari. 7 km from Nahar. 304 km from State capital Chandigarh.

Nathera Pin code is 123302 and postal head office is Kosli.

Bhurthala (3 km), Surkhpur Tappra Kosli (3 km), Kanharwas (3 km), Jhal (3 km), Sham Nagar (4 km) are the nearby villages to Nathera. Nathera is surrounded by Nahar Tehsil towards west, Jatusana Tehsil towards South, Kanina Tehsil towards west, Matannail Tehsil towards North .

Rewari, Charkhi Dadri, Jhajjar, Mahendragarh are the nearby cities to Nathera.

This place is in the border of the Rewari District and Jhajjar District. Jhajjar District Salhawas is north this place.
