= Pal, Mahendragarh =

Village in India

Area
  - Total: 144 ha (360 acres)

Population (2011)
  - Total: 1,136
- Postal Index Number: 123028

Pal is a village in Mahendragarh district of Haryana, India. It is part of the Mahendragarh Assembly constituency and the Bhiwani-Mahendragarh parliament constituency. The nearest town Mahendragarh.

Pal has a total land area of 144 hectares with a population of 1,136 people in 209 households. The village has a literacy rate of 76.79%, with 90.28% of men and 61.23% of women being literate.
