= Pota =

- village
- Nickname: Subash Nagar Khera
- Location in Haryana, India Pota (India)
- Coordinates: 28.425°N 76.225°E
- Country: India
- State: Haryana
- District: Mahendragarh

Government
  - Sarpanch: Hariom Arya

Population (2011)
  - Total: 3,287

Languages
  - Official: Hindi
- Time zone: UTC+5:30 (IST)
- PIN: 123027
- Telephone code: 01285
- ISO 3166 code: IN-HR
- Vehicle registration: HR-82
- Nearest city: Kanina
- Climate: warm (Köppen)
- Website: haryana.gov.in

Pota is a village panchayat located in the Mahendragarh district in the Indian state of Haryana.

== Location and history ==
Pota is a village in Kanina tehsil in Mahendragarh district of Haryana state, India. It belongs to Gurgaon Division. It is located 45 km towards north from district headquarter Narnaul. 20 km from district Mahendergarh. 18 km from Kanina. 327 km from State capital Chandigarh .

The word Pota means "grandson" in Hindi. There are many stories as to how this name was coined, but the most famous story is that once a man along with his family members were passing by this area. They planned to stop here and take rest. The man's daughter in law who was pregnant gave birth to a boy. Being extremely elated the man decided to make this forest area a residential area and name it Pota, After that this is known by this name.

== Demographics ==
In the 2011 census, the total population of the village was 3,287, of whom 388 (11.8%) were children. In 2011, the literacy rate stood at 81.06%, with the male literacy rate higher (92.53%) than the female literacy rate (68.76%).

There are many castes in this village; notable among them are Yadav (Ahir) and Rajputs (Thakur). The native language of Pota is Haryanvi Hindi, but most of the village people can speak and understand Hindi and English.

== Location ==
The nearest town is Kanina at a distance of about 18 km. It is located around 20 km away from district Mahendergarh and 20 km away from Charkhi dadri. It is located around 327 km away from Chandigarh which is the state capital. The other major cities are Delhi and a distance of 106 km and Jaipur at about 221 km away. The surrounding nearby villages and its distance from Pota are Sehlang, Bagoth, Chriya, Sayana, and Nautana.

== Transport ==
It is connected by roads to all parts of the country. The nearest railway station is Gudha and Kanina at a distance of about 12 km and 18 km. The nearest airport is Indira Gandhi International Airport, Delhi situated at a distance of about 105 km.

== Highway ==
Connected by Highway NH-152D

== Education ==
=== Schools ===
- Govt. Sr Sec School, Pota
- RHM High School
- Hindu High School

=== Nearest College/ University ===
- Central University of Haryana
- Dav College Of Engineering And Technology (davcet), Kanina
- PKSD PG College Kanina
- Government PG College Mahendergarh
- Suraj PG College Mahendergarh
- RPS College Mahendergarh
- Yaduvanshi Degree College Mahendergarh
- Janta College Charkhi dadri
- BR Degree College Sehlang

== Temple ==
- Baba kushaldas's temple
- Baba brahampuri Maharaj temple
- Baba Nur-Kha temple
- Shiv Temple
- And many temples are like lord ram, mata mandir and Sarva Dharam mandir
