= Karoli, India =

Karoli may refer to:

Places

- Karoli, Rewari, village in Kosli Tehsil, Rewari District, Haryana, India
- Karauli, (formerly known as Karoli) town in Karauli District, Rajasthan, India
