= Sujjan Singh Yadav =

Indian Army Ashoka Chakra recipient (1953-1994)

Subedar Sujjan Singh Yadav. AC
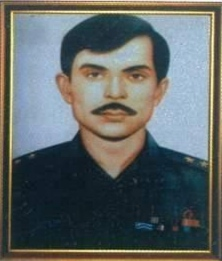
- Portrait of Subedar Sujjan Singh, AC
- Born: March 30, 1953; Kanina Khas, Mahendergarh, Haryana, India
- Died: September 26, 1994 (aged 41); Kupwara, Jammu and Kashmir, India
- Military career
- Allegiance: India
- Branch: Indian Army
- Rank: Subedar
- Service number: JC- 216611
- Unit: 13 Kumaon
- Conflicts: Indo-Pakistani War of 1971; Battle of Longewala; Insurgency in Jammu and Kashmir; Operation Rakshak
- Awards: Ashoka Chakra

Subedar Sujjan Singh Yadav, AC (30 March 1953 – 26 September 1994) was an Indian Army Junior Commissioned Officer (JCO) with the 13th Battalion of the Kumaon Regiment. He was awarded the highest peace time gallantry award Ashoka Chakra posthumously for his action in Operation Rakshak in Kupwara, Jammu and Kashmir.

== Early life ==
Subedar Sujjan Singh was born on 30 March 1953 in Kanina Khas village in Mahendergarh district of Haryana. Son of Shri Mangal Singh and Sarti Devi, Sub Sujjan belonged to a family of farmers. His initial education was at home but later he went to the state high school and studied up to class VII. During his school days he had great interest in sports and specially loved playing hockey.

== Military career ==
Subedar Sujjan Singh was fascinated by the army life and soon joined the army before completing his school education. He was recruited into the 13th battalion of the Kumaon Regiment, a regiment known for its gallant soldiers and various battle exploits. During 1971 Indo-Pak war, he along with his unit was deployed in the Longewala region in Rajasthan and the unit received the theater honour for its valour and service.

The then Havildar Sujjan singh got promoted to the rank of Naib Subedar on 01 Aug 1991 and got posted to 20th battalion of NCC Kolkata. After completing his tenure in Bengal he was promoted to the rank of Subedar and returned to his parent unit of 13 Kumaon. During 1994 his unit was deployed in J & K area engaged in anti-insurgency operations.

== Operation in Kupwara ==
On 26 September 1994, Singh was the search party commander of an operation to eliminate terrorists from the jungles near the Zalurah village of Kupwara in Jammu and Kashmir. The team identified the militant hideouts but faced heavy gunfire from them, within a distance of 15 metres from the hideout. Sensing that he needed to provide cover for his team, Singh physically charged towards the hideout. He sustained several gunshot wounds but still continued to move forward until bullets pierced his helmet and killed him instantly. Singh's act ensured that all the terrorists were killed, their arms and ammunitions recovered, and his team saved.[2] His great bravery is every year celebrated in the home town by his family members and "jalura surya samiti".On 26 September every year.

== Ashoka Chakra Awardee ==
For his bravery, he was posthumously awarded the Ashoka Chakra, the highest peacetime military decoration in India.

== Legacy ==
Sujjan Vihar, the residential colony of the Army Welfare Housing Organization in Gurgaon is named after Sujjan Singh. In 2008, the Sujjan Vihar Welfare Management Society installed a bust of Singh to commemorate his sacrifice.
