= Khajpur =

Khajpur Thola Mohammed
- Village
- Location in Haryana, India Khajpur (India)
- Country: India
- State: Haryana
- Region: North India
- District: Jhajjar
- Established: 1 May 1821
- Founder: Rao Dhablaram s/o Rao Ramdhan s/o Rao Buddhar

Population
  - Total: 1,160

Languages
  - Official: Hindi
- Time zone: UTC+5:30 (IST)
- PIN: 124103
- ISO 3166 code: IN-HR
- Vehicle registration: HR-14
- Website: haryana.gov.in

Khajpur is a village in Jhajjar district on Jhajjar- Kosli road at 2 kilometres (1.2 mi) and after that at 1.5 kilometres (0.93 mi)
