= Dhador =

Village in Mahendragarh, Haryana, India

Coordinates: 28.2700°N 76.0520°E

Dhadhot is a village in Mahendragarh tehsil, Mahendragarh district, Haryana, India. The 2011 Census of India recorded a population of 2229, of whom 1044 were female and 1185 male, among 415 households.

Local administration of the village is performed by a panchayat whose sarpanch is elected. It forms a part of the Mahendragarh Vidhan Sabha constituency for the purposes of representation in the Legislative Assembly of Haryana.
