= Budhwal =

Village in Mahendragarh district, Haryana, India

Coordinates: 27.830°N 76.166°E

Budhwal is a village in the Mahendragarh district of the Indian state of Haryana near the state border with Rajasthan.
