= Sujjan Singh =

Sujjan Singh may refer to:

- Sujjan Singh (golfer), Indian golfer
- Sujjan Singh (soldier), Indian soldier
