= Nangal Nunia =

- Village
- Location in India
- Coordinates: 27.87821°N 76.08149°E
- Country: India
- State: Haryana
- District: Mahendragarh district
- Municipality: Mahendragarh

Population (2011)
  - Total: 1,135
- Postal code: 123023
- Website: www.mahendragarh.gov.in

Nangal Nunia is a village in the Mahendergarh district of Haryana, India. It is on Narnaul (Haryana)- Behror(Rajasthan) road. It has at least one branch of Punjab National Bank. Nangal Nunia Sarpanch seat is Unreserved.

== Adjacent villages ==
- Nangal Shyalu
- Nangal Pipa
- Nangal Nunia
- Nangal Kalia
- Nangal Dargu
- Nangal Chaudhary
- Nangal Soda

== Demographics of 2011 ==
As of 2011 India census, Nangal Nunia had a population of 1135 in 198 households. Males (595) constitute 52.42% of the population and females (540) 47.57%. Nangal Nunia has an average literacy (414) rate of 36.47%, lower than the national average of 74%: male literacy (142) is 34.29%, and female literacy (272) is 65.70% of total literates. In Nangal Nunia, 11.31% of the population is under 6 years of age (171).
