= Kanvi =

Village in India

Coordinates: 15°19′N 75°34′E

Kanvi is a village in district Mahendragarh in the state of Haryana, India.
