= Jakhala, Haryana =

Jakhala is a village in Kosli Tehsil in Nahar Block of Rewari, in Rewari district of Haryana, India, and belongs to the Gurgaon Division. Its pin code is 123301.

== Nearby villages ==
- Murlipur
- Gugodh
- Mundhda
- Kanharwas
- Gopalpur Gazi
- Surkhpur Tappra Kosli
- Gudiani
