= Baba Mukteshwar Puri, Kosli =

Baba Mukhteshwar Puri (in Hindi बाबा मुक्तेश्वर पुरी) was a much revered Hindu Yogi, saint, and theologist whose (मठ) Matha was situated in Kosli. Mukhteshwar Puri was 4th saint of the Kosli math. He lived in 12th century A.D. and practiced meditation throughout his life, which bestowed him with great vision and divine power. The enlightened soul is also called Gusai ji(गुसाईं जी ). All communities in & around Kosli still worship him. He is the prime deity of कोसलिया Kausaliya Yadav people, who are descendants of Kaushal/Kosal Dev Singh.

== Early life ==
Mukhteshwar Puri was born in 1130 AD in Daboda village, under Bahadurgarh Tehsil in Jhajjhar District in a Brahmin family and his childhood name was Mukund Ram. His mother was a religious women & he too showed great inclination towards Bhakti & Dharma since the very beginning. Aged 5, he was sent to his maternal grandfather's home in Bijana/Beejna village. His maternal grandfather was a very learned scholar of Vedas and he fondly educated Mukund Ram. Mukund discovered that he wants to become a Yogi as worldly pleasures didn’t appealed him. He left home to join the company of saints. Mukund Ram reached Puri Math in Kosli in 1143 AD and become a disciple of Rajpuri ji Maharaj. Upon acquiring complete knowledge from his Guru he was designated the fourth mahant under title Mukhteshwar Puri in 1165 AD. He was aged 35 then and did Tap (tough religious undergoings) for 54 Years. Brahmins from Beejna village are Purohits of Kosaliya people. People of Daboda, Bahadurgarh also acknowledge Baba Mukhteshwar Puri as their descendant.

== Foundation of Matha ==
Saint Krishna/Santosh Puri, who came from Uttrakhand to this place (present day Kosli) at around 1000 AD established the monastery/matha tradition at Baba Mukteshwar Puri, Kosli under the Trademark & Evergreen Hins/Heens tree (Capparis sepiaria) in Kosli. Wild animals like Lions, Tigers, Fox, wolf, Reptiles were the inhabitants of the Jungle at that time. Shri Krishna Puri fearlessly meditated in harmony with Nature. He was followed & succeeded by Durga/Prahlad Puri, Rajpuri/Parmanand Puri & Mukhteshwar Puri respectively. In 1193, after the battles of Tarahin, Kaushal Singh & Laxmi Devi came helplessly near his math & asked for help. The holy soul Baba Mukhteshwar Puri, Kosli blessed the Kaushal/Kosal Dev Singh family & the events led to the establishment of Kosli and Baba Mukhteshwar Puri, Kosli math in 1225 AD.

== Legend ==
King Anangpal Tomar ruled Delhi from 1130 AD to 1170 AD. His Kingdom included Kannauj, Gajni, Sultana, Patan, Jaipur, Shekhawati, Ramdevra. He had 2 daughters Sur Sundari and Kirtimalini/Kamla. When Anangpal became old, he decided to handover the kingdoms under his reign to his relatives and trustable court Nobles. He handed over the Delhi & Kannauj throwns to his Grandsons Prithviraj Chauhan & Jaichand respectively.

Patan (lies between Narnaul and Neem Ka Thana in Rajasthan) was given to loyal brothers: Sulen Singh and Ushna(ऊष्ण)/Kesri Singh. Rao Kaushal singh was born to Kesri Singh. But gradually the feuds between the brothers became violent over the matters of kingship. Consequences led Kesri Singh, his wife Kausalya Devi & their son Kaushal Singh to leave from Patan’s Royal Home to avoid family confrontation. They lived in exile for many years. One day, they received message of Prithviraj Chauhan which asked for support from fellow kings to fight unitedly against Muhammad of Ghor who had attacked Delhi. Kesari singh decided to stood up for his motherland in the hour of adversity. They first reached the residence of Raja Dilip Singh (father of Kausalya) in Delhi. Dilip Singh introduced beautiful, educated, able and dynamic Kosal Dev Singh (aged 16) to Thakur Jaswant Singh. Jaswant Singh was impressed with Kaushal singh and married her daughter Laxmi Devi with Kaushal Singh.

== Battle of Tarain, 1192 AD & afterwards ==
Then Second Battle of Tarain followed in which Kesri Singh and Kaushal Singh fought for Prithviraj Chauhan against the Muhammad Ghori. It was one of the greatest & Landmark battle in the History of India. After massive Bloodshed, Hindu rulers led by Prithviraj Chauhan got defeated. Maharaj Kesari went missing or was dead. The invaders exploited the Hindus, their wealth and their religious shrines. It is mentioned in Prithviraj Raso. Thakur Jaswant Singh asked his pregnant daughter Laxmi Devi and son-in-law Kaushal singh to leave from Delhi immediately and gave them ownership of 45 villages in Dowry. Kaushal Dev singh and Laxmi Devi exhibited bravery and reached the designated intense Forest 40 km south of Jhajjar. There were wild animals like Tiger, Bears, Monkeys and shrubs with thrones. With great courage and amid difficulties Laxmi Devi gave birth to a boy at midnight. The Chandravanshi couple became happy and recognized the presence of a divine power in the vicinity.

== Meeting with Baba Mukteshwar Puri ==
Kosal Dev Singh looked nearby for Water in the dense forest after the birth of his son. He noticed fire light and smoke coming from a direction. He moved ahead considering it a good omen. An ash smeared saint was meditating under a Heens Tree in that Jungle. Kaushal Dev singh was astonished and pleased. He bowed to this saint Baba Mukhteshwar Puri. The saint asked the King about his identity and purpose to visit here. Kaushal Dev Singh narrated the entire story of war and exile and asked for shelter. At the crack of dawn (sunrise), Baba Mukteshwar Puri did Shanknaad as usual. He blessed Rao Kaushal Dev Singh, his escort Kausalya and newborn baby. Baba Mukteshwar named the newborn as Mohan Dev Singh because he was born in midnight like Lord Krishna. Laxmi Devi offered Shawl to the spiritual leader.

== 3 Boons & Further Development ==
Baba Mukteshwar Puri gave three boons to Kaushal Dev Singh in 1193AD. First, establish a settlement here. It will be a big town consequently. Nobody will be able to challenge you. Second, your clans will see a unprecedented Growth. Third, the glory of your brave clan will propel in all directions. The sage asked Kaushal Dev Singh to be confident and Hard working and also warned him to be aware of water and fire calamities.

In this area Kaushal singh established Kosli/Kaushalgarh with the blessings of Baba Mukteshwar Puri in 1193 AD. The clan of Rao Kaushal Singh have Kosaliya gotra and Yadav caste. Kaushal Singh and his wife Laxmi Devi made their settlement in the forest i.e present day Kosli. The couple was Educated, Brave, adorable & Hard- working. For earning livelihood they removed nearby shrubs and started engaging in Horticulture and Animal Husbandry. The tough days passed and the boundaries & population of Kosli flourished. In 1225 AD, Kaushal Dev Singh announced that Kosli is his throne & glory of Baba Mukteshwar Puri increased further. Good upbringing of son Mohan Dev was ensured & subsequently he was married to Veermati who was from nearby village.

Matha establishment: A small monastery/math in the honour of Baba Mukteshwar Puri was also built at the same place where the saint used to meditated under auspicious Heens हींस tree. Kaushal Dev Singh vowed that he and his generations will always be worshippers & maintain the sacredness of Matha Baba Mukteshwar Puri, Kosli. 825 have passed and the promise is cheerfully observed till this date. Kosaliya gotra people from all across the India & abroad worship Baba Mukteshwar Puri Maharaj. Youths offer their 1st salary in respect. Ahirwal soldiers and officers in Indian Army acknowledge Baba Mukteshwar Puri.

== Social Importance & Teachings ==
After Muslim rulers invaded India under Muhumad Gori in 1193 AD, the nation was under great turmoil. The locals including women were cruelly exploited. Wealth was drained and Hindu Temples were destructed preposterously. People left their native places and took shelter in nearby forests and mountains. Hundreds of sages like Baba Mukteshwar Puri were guiding light to society as they contained & transferred the traditional knowledge, Vedas & moral values to next generations.

Baba Mukteshwar Puri believed in Peace, Brotherhood & Truth. He believed that inner enlightenment is the eternal bliss. Meditation provokes the spiritual energy which gives us soothing qualities like Positivity, prosperity, Strength and Peace. These parameters aligns/connects our Body-Mind-Soul to the Supreme deity which is the true Wealth. Om sound is humming spontaneously in the Universe and the creature of all is ever Benevolent & helpful. Everybody is sent by God to this earth with a purpose. One should discover his duties & responsibilities through all the delusions & disarray.

== Fairs ==
It is believed that Baba Mukteshwar puri is immortal in his Samadhi. Newly wed couples and new born babies of Kosli and Kosaliya gotra visit Baba Mukhteshwar Puri Math with devotion. The Kosli people credit Baba for their prosperity & Harmony. Rot-Churma(रोट-चूरमा), Dahi(curd), Flag is offered to the sage. In Kosli Math, Shakkar(शक्कर ) Prasada is distributed and turmeric teeka(हल्दी टीका) is applied on the forehead of devotees who come from nearby towns and far states also. Fairs/mela is organised in the Baba Mukhteshwat Puri, Kosli during Holi and 14 Sep every year.

== Committee ==
To look into the administrative matters of Baba Mukteshwar Puri Matha a committee was formed 23 December 2007. It was registered as “Baba Mukhteshwar Puri Math Adarsh Samiti” Kosli, Rewari, Haryana. The campus of holy shrine was enlarged in 2008. The 86 feet tall Gumbad, new rooms, railing near Heens tree, efficient water arrangements, Clean and planned Gardens, toilets, new Hall, etc were built by the Adarsh Samiti.

A Book titled "History of Kosli and Kosaliya gotra & Glory of Baba Mukhteshwar Puri" has been published in 2017 by the Native Kausaliya Ahirs/Yadav people. The book has received much appreciation and provides a Handsome compilation of Ahirwal History.
