= Lilodh =

Lilodh Lulodh
- Village
- Location in Haryana, India Lilodh (India)
- Coordinates: 28.4529°N 76.4007°E
- Country: India
- State: Haryana
- District: Rewari

Population (2020)
  - Total: 5,406 (approx.)

Languages
  - Official: Hindi
- Time zone: UTC+5:30 (IST)
- PIN: 123303
- Telephone code: 01259
- ISO 3166 code: IN-HR
- Vehicle registration: HR - 43
- Website: haryana.gov.in

Lilodh is a village in Kosli tehsil, Rewari district in the state of Haryana, India. It is known for being the birthplace of many members of the Indian Armed Forces. The village has also contributed many Sanskrit teachers (Shastri) to India's education system, especially from the older generations.

Lilodh is located at 28.45°N 76.40°E.

== Schools ==
- Govt. Senior Secondary School
- New Horizon Public School

== Temples ==
- Baba Bhola Shiv Mandir is a temple for worshipping Lord Shiva (Bholenath). A fair is held here twice every year on the occasion of Shivratri in both February and July where thousands of people come to worship and renew their faith. There is an ancient story related to this temple, which states that about 60 years ago Lord Shiva's Shivling was discovered by a local Seth (Bania). The Bania and his wife lived in the nearby village of Ladayan. Many years had passed in their marriage but they had been unable to conceive children, which worried them. They visited many doctors and saints looking for a solution but received nothing but disappointment. One day they met a renowned saint who offered them a solution. He told them about a place in the village of Lilodh where Lord Shiva was present in the form of a big stone. The couple decided to go there to search for Lord Shiva. Despite a week of searching, they did not find Lord Shiva. They gave up and sat down. Then the god Bholenath showed his glory and a miracle took place. They decided to renew their efforts, searching everywhere except the bushes. Eventually they turned their search to the bushes where their eyes fell upon a stone projecting from the ground. With their eyes twinkling, they dug around the stone. After four or five feet down they still could not find the base of stone. They hadn't found an ordinary stone, but the Shivling in which Lord Shiva was present. The Bania wanted to build a temple there, but the landowner (Sh. Dayanand) refused to the request to sell the land. And the land owner granted the part of land need to make the temple.Then after the Landowner's call the Bania built a small temple, which he and his wife visited every Monday to worship with true hearts. A year later, they had a child of a sharp mind. He brought the first 'Kawad' for the god Bholenath. Seeing this, many people began to bring 'Kawad', and the temple became known as Baba Bhola. Thus, it is said that fervent worshippers at this temple will have their wishes fulfilled.
- Thakur Ji Temple
- Shree Shyam Baba Temple
- Mata Mandir
