= Gudiani =

- Village
- Location within Haryana
- Coordinates: 28°21′N 76°32′E
- Country: India
- State: Haryana
- Division: Gurgaon
- District: Rewari
- PIN: 123301

Guriani, or Gudiyani, also known as Adarsh Gram Guriani, is a village located in Rewari district of the Haryana, India. It is located 21 km north of the district headquarters, Rewari, 309 km from state capital Chandigarh and 80 km from the capital, New Delhi.

About 1150 houses and 6000 people are living in the village. Panchayati Raj applied in this village. The village divided into four mohalla's and 16 wards. Three government schools and four private schools are running in this village.

In the past, this village was famous for Garden of Berries (Ber ke Bag), Merchants, Horses and water. One quote is very famous about Guriani "Char Cheez tauafa-ae-Guriani, Ber, Saudagar, Ghore (Horses) aur Panni".

Guriani is the birthplace of great Poet and Freedom fighter Babu Bal Mukund Gupt and famous cartoonist and poet Ramesh Kumar Chhawal. Hindi and Haryanvi are the major languages spoken in this region.

The name 'Guriani' is derived from the sweet 'Gud'. In Guriani, people of all religions live peacefully, celebrating their rituals and traditions in harmony.

== Nearby villages ==
- Kosli
- Jatusana
- Nangal Pathani
- Katopuri Bujurg
- Gugodh
- Murlipur
- Jakhala
- Pintu yadav Surkhpur
