= Kanharwas =

Coordinates: 28°24′N 76°30′E

Kanharwas is a village in Rewari district in the Indian state of Haryana. It is situated adjacent to Kosli. This is the first village on Kosli-Rewari and Kosli - Gurgaon road link. A very big canal named JLN Canal KALAKA goes near this village, which is good for village farmers of this village. So many old and beautiful houses are in this great village as well as so many modern beautiful houses.

The village has been accorded with the status of Nirmal Gaon (clean village) by the Haryana Government and all the streets are made up of R.C.C. Most of the people are serving in defence & engineering fields. People of the village are employed in various sectors. People of the village are educated from many colleges, schools, institutes and other education centers are only in 3 to 5 km area, which gives good education. A government high school is also located here. Two railway stations of Kosli and Nangal Pathani are nearby.
