= Banihari =

Village in India

Banihari is a village in Narnaul subdistrict of Mahendragarh district, Haryana, India.

== Notable people ==
Major Satish Dahiya (Shaurya Chakra)
