= Kosal Dev Singh =

- Father: Ausan Singh/Kesri Singh

Kosal Dev Singh was the grandson of Anangpal Tomar, the son of Ausan Singh/Kesri Singh, who was the king of Patan, Alwar. According to the Haryana State Gazetteer, Singh founded Kosli, a large village in 1193 A.D. He was said to have met the sage Baba Mukteshwar Puri, Kosli, who was engaged in meditation under dense shrub jungle.
