= Satnali =

- Town
- Location in Haryana, India Satnali (India)
- Coordinates: 28.375°N 75.964°E
- Country: India
- State: Haryana
- District: Mahendragarh

Government
  - Type: Democracy
  - Body: Gram Panchayat

Population (2011)
  - Total: 10,013

Languages
  - Official: Hindi
- Time zone: UTC+5:30 (IST)
- PIN: 123024
- ISO 3166 code: IN-HR
- Vehicle registration: HR-35
- Sex ratio: 889:1000♂/♀
- Website: haryana.gov.in

Satnali is a town and tehsil of Mahendragarh district in the southwestern region of Haryana, India. Positioned within the Kanina Community Development (CD) Block, it functions under the local administration of an elected Sarpanch via the Panchayati Raj framework.

== Geography ==
Satnali is in the northwestern region of Mahendragarh

== Demography ==
Subject	Total	Male	Female
Total number of houses	1,874		
Population	10,013	5,301	4,712
Child (0-6)	1,236	667	569
Schedule Caste	2,263	1,205	1,058
Schedule Tribe	0	0	0
Literacy	77.68 %	87.18 %	67.05 %
