= Lookhi =

Lookhi Lakhipur
- Village
- Location in Haryana, India Lookhi (India)
- Coordinates: 28.3864168°N 76.3687134°E
- Country: India
- State: Haryana
- District: Rewari

Population
  - Total: 8,000

Languages
  - Official: Hindi
- Time zone: UTC+5:30 (IST)
- PIN: 123303
- ISO 3166 code: IN-HR
- Vehicle registration: HR - 43
- Nearest city: Kanina / Kosli
- Lok Sabha constituency: Rohtak
- Vidhan Sabha constituency: Kosli
- Website: haryana.gov.in

Lookhi, formerly known as Lakhipur, is a village in Kosli Tehsil, Rewari district, Haryana, India. It is located on the Kosli–Kanina road and is equidistant from both cities. With a population of 6,000 to 8,000 people, Lookhi is a relatively large village.

During British Era, The then headman of the village, Haridwari Lal Nambardar donated some land and built a school on his own, later on the school was recognised by the government.

Lookhi has an Arya Samaj temple. The temple was paved in 1957 by prospective Arya shepherds of the village. Hawan and certain cultural activities have been performed in the Arya Samaj temple to promote peace and calmness in the village.

The village is known for contributing to the movement of Indian independence. Over 47 residents of Lookhi have participated in the Indian Independence Movement.

== Education ==
The village is noted for its inclusion of women in society. A majority of women can read, and every third house has a teacher. Thus, the village has a total of over 310 teachers.

== See also ==
- Karoli
- Kosli
- Kanina khas
- Rewari
- Mahendragarh
