= Kanina Khas =

Kanina khas
- Town
- Kanina Khas
- Nickname: Kanina
- Location in Haryana, India Kanina khas (India)
- Coordinates: 28.29°N 76.20°E
- Country: India
- State: Haryana
- District: Mahendragarh
- Established: 13th century
- Named after: pitamah khana Singh

Government
  - Body: municipal committee Tehsil Block

Area
  - Total: 21.47 km^{2} (8.29 sq mi)
  - Rank: 2
- Elevation: 255 m (837 ft)

Population (census2021)
  - Total: 24,000
  - Density: 1,100/km^{2} (2,900/sq mi)

Languages
  - Official: Hindi
- Time zone: UTC+5:30 (IST)
- PIN: 123027
- Telephone code: 01285
- ISO 3166 code: IN-HR
- Vehicle registration: HR 82
- Tehsil: Kanina
- Vidhan Sabha constituency: Ateli
- Climate: Dry (Köppen)
- Website: https://kaninacity123027.wixsite.com/kaninacity

Kanina is a town and a subdivision in Mahendragarh district in the Indian state of Haryana. It is one of three administrative blocks of Mahendragarh district. It is in the Ahirwal region. It is a municipal committee of Kanina Subdivision in Mahendragarh district.

== Demographics ==
Kanina is dominated by Yadav (Ahir) caste. Many Ahir are in the Indian Army.

== History ==
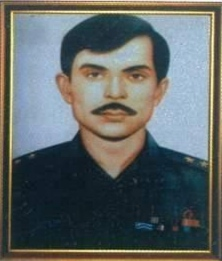
Sujjan Singh Yadav, Ashok Chakra

Kanina is historical place which settled by Rao Kanha Ram in 13th Century. Rao Harjimal son Rao Har Sewak fought battle with Khanzadas of Mewat and defeated them. Brother of Rao Har Sewak Ghumani Ram fought famous battle of Mandan in 1770-1785 which was led by Mitra Sen Ahir . Kanina's ancient name was Kanana. Kanina Khas having very rich military tradition as many soldiers were from here, Subedar Sujjan Singh Yadav, Subedar Chajuram, Subedar Budhram, Jemadar Bharo Singh Yadav.Ganeshi lal, Gangaram, Netram, Rao Kirorimal, Bhup Singh and Ranjit Singh were soldiers of Indian National Army.

== Governance ==
Kanina was a Constituency from independence to 1977. Major MLAs at that time included Subedar Omkar Singh and Rao Dalip Singh. In 1977 Kanina Constituency was split between Jatusana and half in Mahendergarh. People of Kanina protested that change in 2004.

== Villages ==
The 47 villages are in Kanina tehsil are Pathera, Kheri, Sayana, Nautana, Uchat, Bhagot, Kotiya, Khirana, Isharana, Kakrala, Kanina Bharaf, Dhanunda, Sehlang, Mori, Mundia khera, Rasulpr, Partal, Sihor, Sundrahq, Bewal, Bhojawas, Chelawas, Dongra jat, Gudha, Kanina, Dongra ahir, Aghiar, Kemla, Talwana, Pota, Jharli, Chhitroli, Kapoori, Karira, Koka, Manpura, Rambas, Mohmadpur, Kalwari, Nangal, Gahra, Gomli, Kanina Unhani, Gomla, Jhigawan, Kharkra Bass, and Dhana.

== Demographics ==
Kanina had a population of 13,000 in 2011 census and it is estimated that the population exceeds 23,000 in 2021. Kanina has an average literacy rate of 89%. Mostly, it is Yadav dominated .
