= Mahendragarh district =

Coordinates: 28.0444°N 76.1083°E

- District
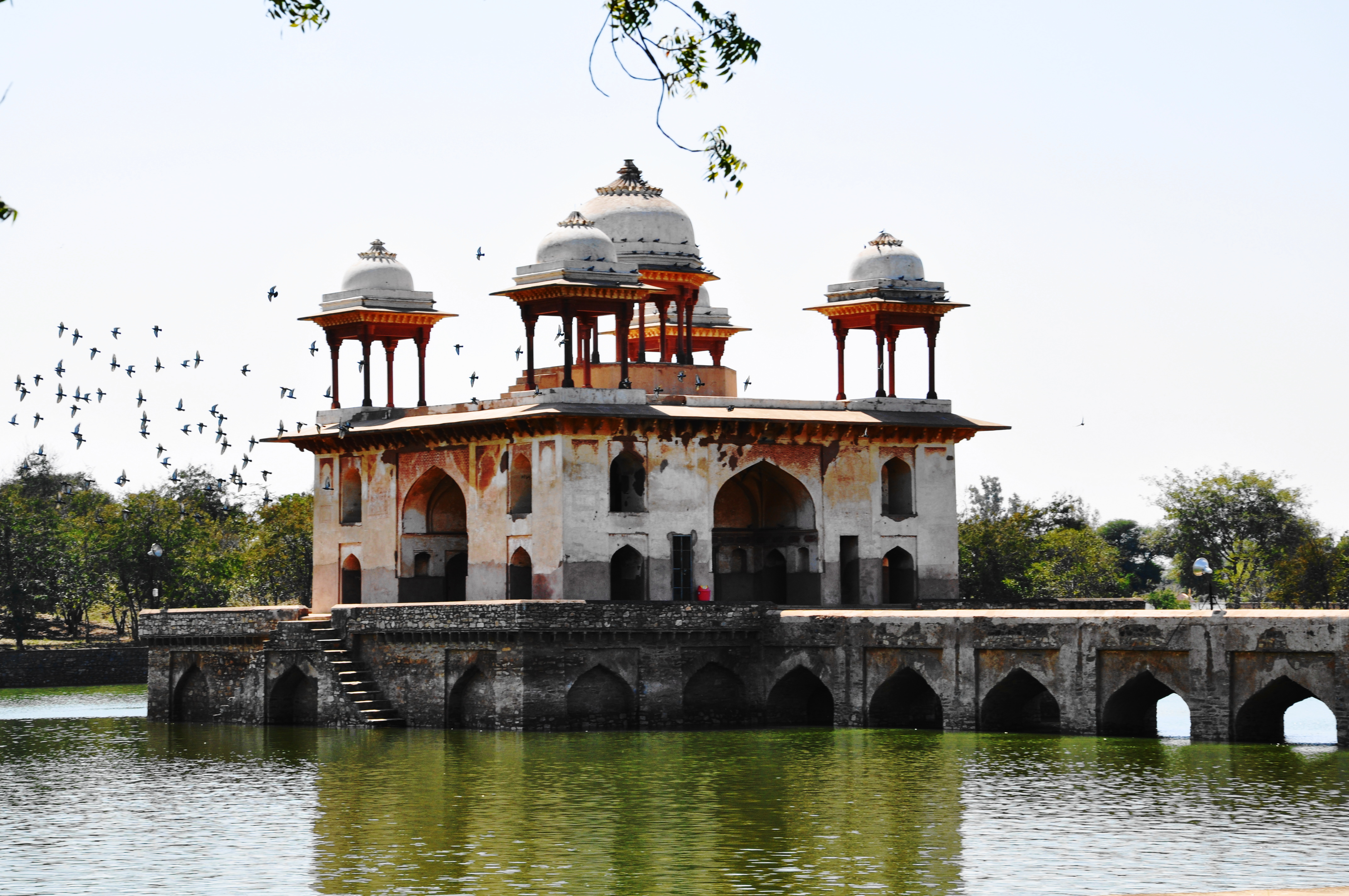
- Jal Mahal in Narnaul

- Location in Haryana
- Country: India
- State: Haryana
- Division: Gurgaon
- Headquarters: Narnaul
- Tehsils: 1. Narnaul, 2. Mahendragarh ,3. Kanina, 4.Ateli, 5. Nangal Choudhary 6. Satnali

Area
  - Total: 1,899 km^{2} (733 sq mi)

Population (2011)
  - Total: 922,088
  - Density: 485.6/km^{2} (1,258/sq mi)
  - Urban: 13.49%

Demographics
  - Literacy: 77.72%
  - Sex ratio: 914/1000
- Time zone: UTC+05:30 (IST)
- Lok Sabha constituencies: Bhiwani-Mahendragarh (shared with Bhiwani district)
- Vidhan Sabha constituencies: 4
- Website: mahendragarh.gov.in

Mahendragarh district is one of the 23 districts of Haryana state in Northern India. The district occupies an area of 1,899 km² and has a population of 922,088 (2021census). District has 4 Sub-divisions : Narnaul, Mahendragarh, Nangal Chaudhary and Kanina

Narnaul city is the administrative headquarters of the district and also the largest city of the district. Mahendragarh is one of the very few districts in India where the name of the district and its main town are different. Mahendragarh has a total of 5 big towns Narnaul, Mahendragarh, Nangal Chaudhary, Ateli and Kanina.

As of 2011 it is the third least populous district of Haryana (out of 21 districts at that time, currently there are 23 districs in Haryana), after Panchkula and Rewari.

== Etymology ==
Mahendragarh Fort which was built by the Maratha ruler Tantia Tope during the 19th century was named Mahendragarh in 1861 by Narinder Singh, the ruler of Patiala, in honour of his son, Mahendra Singh, and consequently the town came to be known as Mahendragarh. The name of Narnaul Nizamat was changed to "Mahendragarh Nizamat."

== History ==
=== Medieval rule ===
During the rule of Mughals, Babur assigned the area to Malik Mahdud Khan. However, later it was taken over by Patiala Riyasat. Birbal ka Chatta is very famous in Narnaul. People say the cave ends in Gurugram. Jal Mahal and Chor Guband were also made during Mughal rule.

In the 18th century, Madhogarh Fort was built on the top of the hill near Madhogarh village.

Both Mahendragarh's fort and Madhogarh's fort are being restored along the lines of Pinjore Gardens to develop them as an international tourist destination as part of the Rewari-Narnaul-Mahendragarh-Madhogarh tourist circuit.

=== Post-independence ===
Mahendragarh district was formed in 1948 by grouping different tracts of erstwhile princely states: Narnaul and Mahendragarh tehsils from Patiala State, Dadri (Charkhi Dadri) from Jind State and a part of Bawal Nizamat from Nabha State. It became a part of Patiala and East Punjab States Union (PEPSU) state. On 1 November 1956, with the merger of PEPSU with Punjab, it became a part of Punjab state and with the formation of Haryana state in 1966, it became a part of the newly formed state. Rewari tehsil of Gurgaon district was added to it in 1972 but Rewari tehsil was made a separate district in 1989.

== Geography ==
The district lies between north latitude 27°47’ to 28°26’ and east longitude 75°56’ to 76°51’. It is bounded on the north by Bhiwani, Charki dadri, jhajjar and Rewari districts, on the east by Rewari district and Alwar district of Rajasthan, on the south by Alwar, Jaipur and Sikar districts of Rajasthan, and on the west by Sikar and Jhunjhunu districts of Rajasthan.

== Sub-Divisions ==
The Mahendragarh district is headed by an IAS officer of the rank of Deputy Commissioner (DC) who is the chief executive officer of the district. The district is divided into 4 sub-divisions, each headed by a Sub-Divisional Magistrate (SDM): Narnaul, Mahendragarh, Nangal Chaudhary and Kanina.

=== Revenue tehsils ===
The above 4 sub-divisions are divided into 5 revenue tehsils, namely, Narnaul, Mahendragarh, Kanina, Nangal Chaudhry & Ateli and 1 revenue sub-tehsil namely Satnali.

== Assembly constituencies ==
There are 4 Haryana Vidhan Sabha constituencies located in this district: Ateli, Mahendragarh, Narnaul and Nangal Chaudhry. All 4 are part of the Bhiwani–Mahendragarh (Lok Sabha constituency).

== Economy ==
In 2006 the Ministry of Panchayati Raj named Mahendergarh one of the country's 250 most backward districts (out of a total of 640). It is one of the two districts in Haryana currently receiving funds from the Backward Regions Grant Fund Programme (BRGF).

== Tourism ==
Dhosi Hill is an important tourist site in the district. Known as Chyawan Rishi Ashram, it is a Vedic period site. It is here that Chyawanprash was formulated for the first time. Bhagot village had Lord Shiva temple constructed by a Rabari.

== Divisions ==
Mahendragarh district is divided into 5 tehsils: Narnaul, Nangal Chaudhary, Kanina Mahendragarh, and Ateli. There are 4 Vidhan Sabha constituencies in this district: Ateli, Mahendragarh, Narnaul and Nangal Chaudhary. All of these are part of Bhiwani-Mahendragarh Lok Sabha constituency.

=== Villages ===
- Bachini
- Banihari
- Karira
- Pota
- Pal, Mahendragarh
- Rewasa
- Begpur

Kheri Talwana sehlang Nautana Baghot Dhanonda Kharkada Bass Pathera Aghihar Buchawas Jhagroli Bawana Majra Malda akoda Jannt Bhurjhat Khudana Dholi

== Demographics ==
Historical population
Year	Pop.	±% p.a.
1951	277,320	—
1961	340,059	+2.06%
1971	423,797	+2.23%
1981	533,074	+2.32%
1991	681,869	+2.49%
2001	812,521	+1.77%
2011	922,088	+1.27%

Religion in Mahendragarh district (2011)
Religion	Percent
Hinduism	99.04%
Islam	0.61%
Other or not stated	0.35%

According to the 2011 census, Mahendragarh district has a population of 922,088, This gives it a ranking of 462nd in India (out of a total of 640). The district has a population density of 485 inhabitants per square kilometre (1,260/sq mi). Its population growth rate over the decade 2001-2011 was 13.43%. Mahendragarh has a sex ratio of 895 females for every 1000 males, and a literacy rate of 77.72%. 14.41% of the population lives in urban areas. Scheduled Castes make up 16.95% of the population.

=== Languages ===
Languages of Mahendragarh district (2011)
1. Hindi (56.8%)
2. Haryanvi (40.4%)
3. Rajasthani (2.18%)
4. Others (0.65%)

The local dialect of the district is Ahirwati. At the 2011 Census, the majority of the population identified their first language as either Haryanvi or Hindi.
