= Kosli =

Kosli Koshalgarh
- Town
- Location in Haryana, India Kosli (India)
- Coordinates: 28.391771°N 76.4793315°E
- Country: India
- State: Haryana
- District: Rewari
- Founder: Baba Mukteshwar Puri
- Named for: Maharaj Koshal

Government
  - Type: Panchayat (Municipal committee)

Area
  - Total: 23.98 km^{2} (9.26 sq mi)
- Elevation: 241 m (791 ft)

Population (census2011)
  - Total: 22,000
  - Density: 920/km^{2} (2,400/sq mi)

Languages
  - Official: Hindi हिंदी, Ahirwate
- Time zone: UTC+5:30 (IST)
- PIN: 123302
- ISO 3166 code: IN-HR
- Vehicle registration: HR – 43
- Sex ratio: 57:43 ♂/♀

Kosli is a town and "tehsil" in the Rewari district of Haryana in India. It comes in Ahirwal region. Kosli Tehsil is known as the "Cultural Capital of Haryana" due to its rich cultural heritage and traditional arts. Kosli is bordered by Jhajjar district to the north. It is located approximately 80 kilometers southwest of Delhi and is part of the National Capital Region.

== History ==
According to Haryana State Gazetteer, Kosli was founded in 1193 A.D. by Manvendra Singh Yadav, the grandson of King of Delhi. Kosal Dev Singh said to have met the sage Baba Mukteshwar Puri, Kosli engaged in meditation at Koshalgarh Kosli, which was then a dense shrub jungle. Its also called "Abode of Soldiers". A famous book Battle of Rezang La written by Famous screen writer Kulpreet Yadav.

During British Raj there were as many as 70 senior Commissioned Officers and 150 Junior Commissioned Officers in Kosli. 247 soldiers from Kosli participated in the First World War between 1914-1918.
