= Mahendragarh =

- City
- Location in Haryana, India Mahendragarh (India)
- Coordinates: 28.28°N 76.15°E
- Country: India
- State: Haryana
- District: Mahendragarh
- Elevation: 262 m (860 ft)

Population (2011)
  - Total: 29,128

Languages
  - Official: Hindi
  - Spoken: Haryanvi
- Time zone: UTC+5:30 (IST)
- PIN: 123029
- ISO 3166 code: IN-HR
- Vehicle registration: HR-34
- Website: www.mahendragarh.gov.in

Mahendragarh is a city and a municipal committee in Mahendragarh district in the Indian state of Haryana. It is nearly 100 kilometres (62 mi) from Gurgaon and comes under National Capital Region (India). The city has a mini secretariat along with a sub divisional court.

== Etymology ==
Earlier Mahendragarh was known as Kanaud because it was founded and inhabited by Kanaudia Brahmins. In the 1860s it was renamed after Maharaja Mahendra Singh (r. 1721-1748 CE) of Patiala State who was gifted this area by the British East India Company for his help in crushing the Indian Rebellion of 1857 in this area.

== Geography ==
Mahendragarh is located at 28.28°N 76.15°E. It has an average elevation of 262 metres (859 feet). Mahendragarh district is bounded on the north by Charkhi Dadri, Bhiwani and jhajjar districts, on the east by Rewari district and Alwar district of Rajasthan, on the south by Alwar, Jaipur and Sikar districts of Rajasthan, and on the west by Sikar and Jhunjhunu districts of Rajasthan. It has five tehsils of Kanina, Narnaul, Ateli, Nangal Choudhary and Mahendergarh.

It is situated on the bank of the Dohan River (which was a seasonal river), which is at the verge of extinction.

== History ==
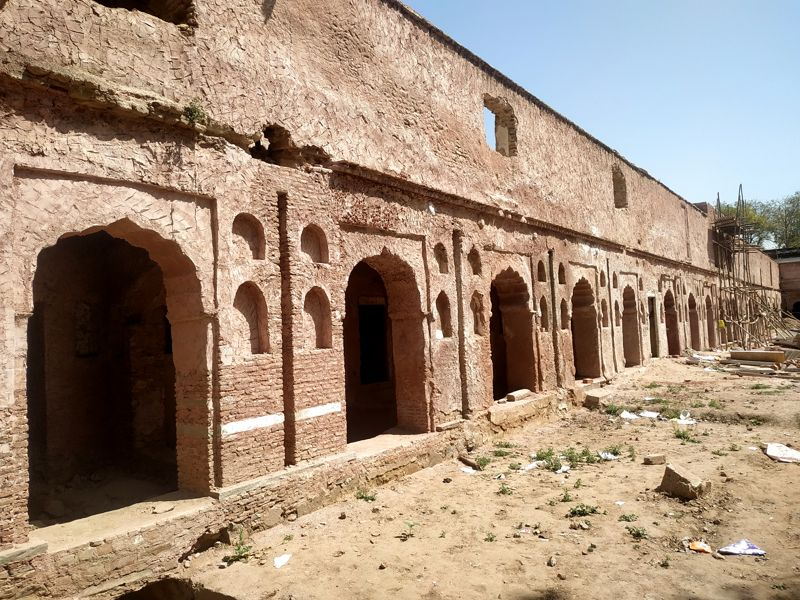
Kannud Fort

Fort of Kanod was built by Maratha ruler Tatya Tope in 1755 CE. In 1860, it came under the Patiala State during the British Raj. The ruler of Patiala, Narendra Singh, changed the name of Kanod Fort to Mahandragarh after his son Mahendra. Because of the name of the fort, this town came to be known as Mahendragarh and the name of Narnaul Nizam was changed to Mahendragarh Nizam.

It is said that Malik Mahadud Khan, a servant of Babar had settled a habitation here.

In 1948, with the formation of PEPSU, Mahendragarh territory from Patiala State, Dadri territory (Now Charkhi Dadri) from Jind and Bawal territory from Nabha State were constituted into Mahendragarh district with the headquarters at Narnaul. At that time, there were three tehsils, namely, Narnaul, Charkhi Dadri and Bawal and Mahendragarh was a sub-tehsil.

In 1949, Mahendragarh sub-tehsil was made a tehsil. In 1950, Bawal tehsil was broken up and 78 villages were transferred to Gurgaon district forming Bawal as a sub-tehsil and remaining villages were added to Narnaul and Mahendragarh. In 1956 the Rewari tehsil (except 61 villages) was excluded from Gurgaon district and included in Mahendragarh district. The Charkhi-Dadri sub-division was excluded from Mahendragarh district and included in the newly constituted district of Bhiwani. In 1977, 81 villages of Rewari tehsil were constituted into Bawal tehsil. In 1978 the district comprised 4 tehsils (Mahendragarh, Rewari, Narnaul and Bawal). On 1 November 1989, Rewari and Bawal tehsils (taken from Mahendragarh district) and Kosli tehsil except 10 villages (taken from Rohtak district) were constituted into a new district of Rewari. Presently Mahendragarh district has 3 sub-divisions (Kanina, Narnaul and Mahendergarh), 5 tehsils (Kanina, Mahendragarh, Nangal Chaudhary, Ateli, Narnaul) and 1 sub-tehsil (Satnali).

== Demographics ==
As of 2011 India census, Mahendragarh had a population of 23,977. Males constitute 53% of the population and females 47%. Mahendragarh has an average literacy rate of 76, higher than the national average of 75%: male literacy is 89%, and female literacy is 67%. In Mahendragarh, 14% of the population is under 6 years of age. Hindus constitute 98% of the population. This area produces good and strong built soldiers. Maximum house found with participation in WW-1 & WW-2.

In spite of being a district headquarters, there is no administrative office. All the relevant work is done in Narnaul. The very first guggul (Commiphora wightii) vatika (place where medicinal plants are planted) was established here.

Now many government offices have opened in Mahendragarh near Government Boys college in new Court.

== Education ==
- Bharatiya Senior Secondary School
- Rao Pahlad Singh Senior Secondary school

== Social groups ==
According to Haryana District Gazetteers: Mahendragarh Yadavs form the agricultural backbone of the district. However Yadavs are in the majority in the district.

== Notable people ==
- Satish Kaushik - Indian film director, producer and actor.
- Gujarmal Modi - founder of Modi Industries and Modi Nagar.
- Swami Ramdev - Yoga Guru and Co founder of Patanjali Ayurveda.
