= List of Monuments of National Importance in Haryana =

This is a list of Monuments of National Importance (ASI) as officially recognized by and available through the website of the Archaeological Survey of India in the Indian state Haryana. The monument identifier is a combination of the abbreviation of the subdivision of the list (state, ASI circle) and the numbering as published on the website of the ASI. 90 Monuments of National Importance have been recognized by the ASI in Haryana.

== List of monuments of national importance ==
SL. No.	Description	Location	Address	District	Coordinates	Image
N-HR-1	Ambala Kos Minar	Ambala city		Ambala district	30°22′41″N 76°45′58″E	Ambala Kos Minar
N-HR-2	Naurangabad mound	Naurangabad		Bhiwani district	28°48′17″N 76°13′41″E	Upload Photo
N-HR-3	Alapur Kos Minar No. 18	Alapur		Palwal district	28°10′38″N 77°18′48″E	Upload Photo
N-HR-4	Anagpur Dam	Surajkund		Faridabad district	28°28′24″N 77°16′34″E	Anagpur Dam More images
N-HR-5	Aurangabad Kos Minar No. 22	Aurangabad		Palwal district	28°01′59″N 77°20′19″E	Upload Photo
N-HR-6	Banchari Kos Minar No. 24	Banchari		Palwal district	27°57′42″N 77°20′24″E	Upload Photo
N-HR-7	Banchari Kos Minar No. 25	Banchari		Palwal district	27°55′35″N 77°21′07″E	Upload Photo
N-HR-8	Bhulwana Kos Minar No. 27	Bhulwana		Palwal district	27°52′06″N 77°23′45″E	Upload Photo
N-HR-9	Gadhpuri Kos Minar No. 16	Gadhpuri		Palwal district	28°15′01″N 77°17′15″E	Upload Photo
N-HR-10	Gadhpuri Kos Minar No. 17	Gadhpuri		Palwal district	28°12′47″N 77°18′04″E	Upload Photo
N-HR-11	Hodal Kos Minar No. 26	Hodal		Palwal	27°53′41″N 77°22′04″E	Upload Photo
N-HR-12	Khatela Sarai Kos Minar No. 23	Khatela Sarai		Palwal district	27°59′49″N 77°19′46″E	Upload Photo
N-HR-13	Bamani Khera Kos Minar No. 21	Bamani Khera (Khera Sarai, old name)		Palwal district	28°04′08″N 77°20′41″E	Upload Photo
N-HR-14	Khusropur Kos Minar No. 20	Khusropur (Kusali pur)		Palwal district	28°06′19″N 77°20′01″E	Upload Photo
N-HR-15	Faridabad Kos Minar No. 10	Khawaza Sarai (Ghosi pur Sarai)	sector 37, city	Faridabad district	28°28′09″N 77°18′37″E	Upload Photo
N-HR-16	Buriya Nala Mughal bridge	Karnal		Karnal district	28°27′37″N 77°18′49″E	Buriya Nala Mughal bridge
N-HR-17	Surajkund Masonry	Lakkarpur	locality in Faridabad	Faridabad district	28°29′03″N 77°17′02″E	Surajkund Masonry More images
N-HR-18	Faridabad Kos Minar No. 11	Mawai	Sector - 29, Faridabad city	Faridabad district	28°32′19″N 77°17′06″E	Upload Photo
N-HR-19	Faridabad Kos Minar No. 13	Mujesar	Sector 24 of Faridabad city	Faridabad district	28°26′01″N 77°19′11″E	Upload Photo
N-HR-20	Palwal Kos Minar No. 19	Palwal city		Palwal district	28°08′32″N 77°19′39″E	Palwal Kos Minar No. 19
N-HR-21	Sikri Fridabad Kos Minar No. 15	Sikri	Ballabhgarh tehsil	Faridabad district	28°17′15″N 77°17′31″E	Upload Photo
N-HR-22	Ancient site	Banawali (Sjotar)		Fatehabad district	29°35′56″N 75°23′32″E	Upload Photo
N-HR-23	Fatehabad Humaun's Mosque	Fatehabad		Fatehabad district	29°31′07″N 75°27′28″E	Upload Photo
N-HR-24	Ashoka Lat of Feroz Shah	Fatehabad city		Fatehabad district	29°31′09″N 75°27′29″E	Upload Photo
N-HR-25	Baoli Ghaus Ali Shah	Farrukhnagar		Gurgaon district	28°27′01″N 76°49′33″E	Baoli Ghaus Ali Shah More images
N-HR-26	Mosque of Ala Vardi Khan	Sarai Ala Vardi Khan		Gurgaon district	28°29′58″N 77°01′05″E	Upload Photo
N-HR-27	Agroha Mound	Agroha city		Hisar district	29°19′54″N 75°37′11″E	Upload Photo
N-HR-28	Barsi gate	Hansi city		Hisar district	29°05′55″N 75°57′52″E	Barsi gate
N-HR-29	Asigarh Fort (Prithviraj Chauhan's Fort)	Hansi city		Hisar district	29°06′18″N 75°57′47″E	Asigarh Fort (Prithviraj Chauhan's Fort) More images
N-HR-30	Ferozshah Palace & Tehkhana	Hisar city		Hisar district	29°10′00″N 75°43′14″E	Ferozshah Palace & Tehkhana More images
N-HR-31	Gujri Mahal	Hisar city		Hisar district	29°10′07″N 75°43′12″E	Gujri Mahal More images
N-HR-32	Lat ki Masjid	Hisar city		Hisar district	29°09′58″N 75°43′15″E	Lat ki Masjid More images
N-HR-33	Rakhigarhi Indus Valley Civilization site	Rakhigarhi		Hisar district	29°17′36″N 76°06′51″E	Rakhigarhi Indus Valley Civilization site More images
N-HR-34	Bhaini Kalan Kos Minar	Bhaini Kalan		Karnal district	29°45′26″N 76°55′44″E	Upload Photo
N-HR-35	Daha Kos Minar	Daha, Karnal		Karnal district	29°37′47″N 76°58′41″E	Upload Photo
N-HR-36	Gharuanda Gateways of Old Mughal Sarai	Gharaunda		Karnal district	29°32′05″N 76°58′19″E	Gharuanda Gateways of Old Mughal Sarai More images
N-HR-37	Gharaunda north Kos Minar	Gharaunda (North)		Karnal district	29°33′21″N 76°58′22″E	Gharaunda north Kos Minar
N-HR-38	Gharaunda south Kos Minar	Gharaunda (South)		Karnal district	29°31′07″N 76°58′20″E	Upload Photo
N-HR-39	Cantonment Church Tower	Karnal city		Karnal district	29°42′22″N 76°59′14″E	Cantonment Church Tower More images
N-HR-40	Karnal European Soldier's Grave	Karnal city		Karnal district	29°42′27″N 76°59′14″E	Karnal European Soldier's Grave More images
N-HR-41	Karnal Namaste Chowk Kos Minar	Karnal city	Namaste Chowk	Karnal district	29°39′56″N 76°59′29″E	Upload Photo
N-HR-42	Karnal city Kos Minar	Karnal city Area		Karnal district	29°41′51″N 76°58′42″E	Upload Photo
N-HR-43	Kohande Kos Minar	Kohande		Karnal district	29°28′49″N 76°58′19″E	Upload Photo
N-HR-44	Kutail Kos Minar	Kutail		Karnal district	29°35′35″N 76°58′54″E	Upload Photo
N-HR-45	Taraori north Kos Minar	Taraori (North)		Karnal district	29°49′28″N 76°54′18″E	Taraori north Kos Minar
N-HR-46	Taraori south Kos Minar	Taraori (South)		Karnal district	29°47′34″N 76°55′22″E	Taraori south Kos Minar
N-HR-47	Theh Polar Indus Valley Civilization mound	Polar, Haryana	Polar Siwan	Kaithal district	29°55′57″N 76°21′34″E	Upload Photo
N-HR-48	Ancient Brick Temple including Prachin Shivalaya	Marvana, Kalayat		Kaithal district	29°40′28″N 76°15′17″E	Ancient Brick Temple including Prachin Shivalaya More images
N-HR-49	Amin Kos Minar	Abhimanyupur		Kurukshetra district	29°53′27″N 76°52′13″E	Upload Photo
N-HR-50	Amin Ancient Mound	Abhimanyupur		Kurukshetra district	29°53′59″N 76°51′53″E	Upload Photo
N-HR-51	Adhaun Kos Minar	Adhaun		Kurukshetra district	29°55′37″N 76°51′40″E	Upload Photo
N-HR-52	Bhawani Khera Kos Minar	Bawani Khera		Kurukshetra district	30°01′48″N 76°49′49″E	Upload Photo
N-HR-53	Fattupur Kos Minar	Fattupur		Kurukshetra district	29°59′36″N 76°49′50″E	Upload Photo
N-HR-54	Mohari Kos Minar	Mohari		Kurukshetra district	30°14′28″N 76°51′00″E	Upload Photo
N-HR-55	Raja Karan ka Quila mound	Thanesar (Mirzapur)		Kurukshetra district	29°57′04″N 76°48′12″E	Upload Photo
N-HR-56	Dera Kalan Kos Minar	Dara Kalan	Thanesar	Kurukshetra district	29°57′39″N 76°50′35″E	Upload Photo
N-HR-57	Thanesar Pathar Masjid	Thanesar		Kurukshetra district	29°58′33″N 76°49′40″E	Thanesar Pathar Masjid More images
N-HR-58	Sheikh Chilli's Tomb	Thanesar		Kurukshetra district	29°58′36″N 76°49′41″E	Sheikh Chilli's Tomb More images
N-HR-59	Raja Harsh ka Tila mound	Thanesar		Kurukshetra district	29°58′34″N 76°49′35″E	Raja Harsh ka Tila mound More images
N-HR-60	Sarai Sukhi Kos Minar	Sarai Sukhi		Kurukshetra district	30°04′02″N 76°50′43″E	Upload Photo
N-HR-61	Shahbad Kos Minar]	Shahbad		Kurukshetra district		Upload Photo
N-HR-62	Zainpur Kos Minar	Zainpur		Kurukshetra district		Upload Photo
N-HR-63	Narnaul Jal Mahal	Narnaul		Mahendragarh district	28°01′43″N 76°06′07″E	Narnaul Jal Mahal More images
N-HR-64	Shah Ibrahim's Tomb	Narnaul		Mahendragarh district	28°02′28″N 76°06′08″E	Shah Ibrahim's Tomb More images
N-HR-65	Shah Quli Khan's Tomb	Narnaul		Mahendragarh district	28°01′53″N 76°05′54″E	Shah Quli Khan's Tomb More images
N-HR-66	Jatipur Kos Minar	Jatipur, Panipat		Panipat district	29°17′55″N 77°00′27″E	Upload Photo
N-HR-67	Kala Amb Battle of Panipat Obelisk, Commemorating Third battle of Panipat	Kala Amb locality Panipat		Panipat district	29°23′46″N 77°01′13″E	Kala Amb Battle of Panipat Obelisk, Commemorating Third battle of Panipat More images
N-HR-68	Kiwana Kos Minar	Kiwana		Panipat district	29°13′24″N 77°00′32″E	Upload Photo
N-HR-69	Manana Kos Minar	Manana		Panipat district	29°15′39″N 77°00′33″E	Upload Photo
N-HR-70	Bab-e-Faiz gate	Panipat city		Panipat district	29°23′49″N 76°58′23″E	Bab-e-Faiz gate More images
N-HR-71	Kabuli Bagh Mosque with enclosure wall	Panipat city		Panipat district	29°23′45″N 76°59′21″E	Kabuli Bagh Mosque with enclosure wall More images
N-HR-72	Ibrahim Lodi's Tomb	Panipat city		Panipat district	29°24′06″N 76°58′22″E	Ibrahim Lodi's Tomb More images
N-HR-73	Panipat Taraf Unsar north Kos Minar AND south Kos Minar	Panipat Taraf Unsar		Panipat district	29°24′20″N 76°58′25″E	Upload Photo
N-HR-74	Taraf Afghan Kos Minar	Taraf Afghan		Panipat district	29°22′14″N 76°58′53″E	Upload Photo
N-HR-75	Sewah Kos Minar	Sewah(Siuuali - old name)		Panipat district	29°20′04″N 76°59′44″E	Upload Photo
N-HR-76	Bayanpur Kos Minar	Bayanpur	near railway track, outskirts of city on Kharkhoda road	Sonipat district		Bayanpur Kos Minar
N-HR-77	Ancient site	Khokra Kot	near Shitala Mata mandir, Jind road.	Rohtak district	28°54′14″N 76°34′25″E	Upload Photo
N-HR-78	Choron-ki-Baoli (Shah Jahan-ki-Baoli)	Maham		Rohtak district	28°57′36″N 76°17′50″E	Choron-ki-Baoli (Shah Jahan-ki-Baoli)
N-HR-79	The Indus Valley Civilization Mound	Sirsa city		Sirsa district	29°31′33″N 75°01′19″E	The Indus Valley Civilization Mound
N-HR-80	Akbarpur Barota Mughal Kos Minar	Akbarpur Barota		Sonepat district	28°53′44″N 77°04′10″E	Upload Photo
N-HR-81	Ganaur Mughal Kos Minar	Ganaur		Sonepat district	28°57′44″N 77°01′59″E	Upload Photo
N-HR-82	Jagdishpur Mughal Kos Minar	Jagdishpur		Sonepat district	29°06′44″N 77°01′03″E	Upload Photo
N-HR-83	Jawahri Mughal Kos Minar	Jawahri		Sonepat district	29°08′56″N 77°00′58″E	Upload Photo
N-HR-84	Panchi Gujran Kos Minar	Panchi Gujran		Sonepat district	29°04′26″N 77°00′44″E	Upload Photo
N-HR-85	Rajpur Kos Minar	Rajpur, Sonipat		Sonepat district	29°06′44″N 77°01′03″E	Upload Photo
N-HR-86	Khwaja Khizr Tomb	Sonipat city		Sonipat district	29°00′25″N 77°00′51″E	Khwaja Khizr Tomb More images
N-HR-87	Sonepat Kos Minar	Sonepat city		Sonepat district	28°59′56″N 77°01′20″E	Sonepat Kos Minar More images
N-HR-88	Jarasandha ka Qila (Kushan Buddhist Stupa)	Karnal city		Karnal district	29°31′19″N 76°36′09″E	Jarasandha ka Qila (Kushan Buddhist Stupa) More images
N-HR-89	Group of Monuments at Jhajjar	Jhajjar city		Jhajjar district	28°36′23″N 76°40′10″E	Group of Monuments at Jhajjar More images
N-HR-90	Nabha House		opposite Sannihit Sarovar	Kurukshetra district	29°58′00″N 76°50′04″E	Nabha House More images
N-HR-91	Archaeological sites and Remains	Adi Badri, Haryana		Yamunanagar district	30°27′28″N 77°20′28″E	Archaeological sites and Remains More images

== See also ==
- State Protected Monuments in Haryana
- List of Indus Valley Civilization sites in Haryana, Punjab, Rajasthan, Gujarat, India & Pakistan
- National Parks & Wildlife Sanctuaries of Haryana
- List of Indian states and territories by highest point
- Haryana Tourism
