= Nangal Choudhary =

- Town
- Location within Haryana Location within India
- Coordinates: 27.8923°N 76.1122°E
- Country: India
- State: Haryana
- District: Mahendragarh

Government
  - Body: Municipal committee
  - MLA: Manju Choudhary (Indian National Congress)
  - Ex MLA: Abhe Singh Yadav (Bharatiya Janata Party)
- Elevation: 302 m (991 ft)

Population (2020)
  - Total: 130,127

Languages
  - Official: Haryanvi, Hindi
- Time zone: UTC+05:30 (IST)
- Postal code: 123023
- Area code: 01282
- ISO 3166 code: IN-HR
- Vehicle registration: HR-35 xx xxxx (for non-commercial vehicles); HR-66 xx xxxx (for commercial vehicles)
- Sex ratio: 879 ♂/♀
- Climate: Cw (Köppen)
- Precipitation: 570 millimetres (22 in)
- Avg. summer temperature: 38 °C (100 °F)
- Avg. winter temperature: 04 °C (39 °F)
- Website: ulbharyana.gov.in/NangalChaudhary/844

Nangal Choudhary is an important town and a sub-division in the Mahendragarh district near Narnaul in India, within the National Capital Region. It is situated in the Ahirwal region. Roughly 84 villages fall under this sub-division and Nangal Chaudhary is the main market for them.

The newly declared Integrated Multi-Modal Logistics Hub (IMLH) project will be located entirely within the Nangal Chaudhary Sub-division; once completed it will be largest logistics hub in North India and will spur growth in region.

== History ==
During the Mughal rule, Narnaul was a flourishing town. Approximately 500 years before the Vikram Samvat year 1962, during the reign of Akbar, his governor Nawab Shah Quli Khan constructed numerous buildings and established several gardens in Narnaul. He also built a mausoleum there. Later, Sonu Choudhary gained control of Nangal Choudhary. He subsequently shared possession of the land with Sitaram. These two then divided the land among their descendants. Over time, four Hindu castes – Malis, Brahmins, Prajapatis, and Rajputs – came to possess equal shares of the land. They governed it and collected revenue from its cultivation.

Originally, when Udai re-established this village, he named it Udai Nangal. The exact time when it became known as Nangal Choudhary is unclear. However, the Choudhary family of this village made significant donations and built schools. In recognition of this generosity, the villagers renamed the village as an act of respect and gratitude towards the family, who later migrated to Kolkata around the 1950s when it was the capital of India. This village has a continuous history on its original site and has never been uninhabited or relocated.

Subsequently, the Nawab of Jhajjar leased this village on a sharecropping (Batai) basis and collected the associated dues. In the year 1914 of the Samvat calendar, a British officer contracted out this land for one year at a rate of Rs 1525. However, after Samvat 1915, the Maharaja of Patiala revoked this contract and resumed direct revenue collection.

In 2012, Nangal Choudhary's administrative status was elevated by the Chief Minister of Haryana, Mr. Bhupender Singh Hooda, who granted it Tehsil and Municipal Committee status. On May 9, 2023, the Haryana Government further upgraded Nangal Choudhary to a Sub-Division. infrastructural improvements in Nangal Choudhary include a new Fire Station, Bus Stand, Sewage Treatment Plant (STP), a well-maintained sewerage system, along with well-constructed internal roads, a new Judicial Complex and a Mini-Secretariat for the sub-division. Nangal Choudhary already has a modern Police Station equipped with CCTV surveillance in key town squares, monitored by the police. Furthermore, the newly constructed 10-lane expressway (NH 148-B) connecting Narnaul to the NH8 Junction, which bypasses the main part of Nangal Choudhary (creating a 3-sided ring road), has established a distinct identity for the town and significantly eased travel to neighboring areas. The anticipated Integrated Multimodal Logistics Hub (IMLH) is also expected to be a major catalyst for future growth in the region.

== Geography ==
Currently, Nangal Choudhary is one of district sub-division headquarters situated in southern part of the district and touches the districts of Kotputli-Behror and Neem Ka Thana of Rajasthan state. The upland tract unit covers the area between northern Narnaul and Nangal Choudhary Hills in the Narnaul Tehsil. A desert upland, situated between 284 and 302 meters above the mean sea level belongs to the Aravali System.

Nangal Choudhary hills in Narnaul tehsil near Haryana-Rajasthan boundary are one of the many geographical features of Independent hill ranges in Mahendragarh in Narnaul Tehsils. East of the Kasoati or Krishnawati river stream, the elevation of 626 m and relative relief of 160 m is found near Mukandpura village. North-west and south of Narnaul town, rounded hillocks and elliptical hills are prominent features of the landscape in the sandy terrain between the Dohan and Kasoati streams. The elevation of the conical hillock near Thanwas- Nayan village is the highest, 652 m.

Dhosi Hills is located nearby and currently the state government is developing it as religious tourism site with a ropeway system.

== Administration ==
Nangal Chaudhary has a Nagar Palika, Tehsil Office, SDM Office, Hospital, Bus Stand and Fire Station. Nangal Chaudhary Assembly constituency is one of the 90 Legislative Assembly constituencies of Haryana state in India since 2009. It is part of Mahendragarh Current MLA of Nangal Chaudhary. Mrs Manju Choudhary has been awarded best MLA award in Haryana Legislative Assembly. Ex MLA Dr Abhe Singh Yadav has been on forefront on solving Water issue and Road conditions in area and due to his visionary ideas and projects, water level has risen in multiple areas. A new Medical college in also being set up.

== People ==
Late Baijnath Choudhary also belongs to Nangal Chaudhary town. He has done lot of social work in this area which includes New hospital building, Government girls College Building, Water Pipeline project, New Market at Bus Stand and lot of social donation in area including scholarship's. He has also helped in establishing a large Goshala in Nangal Chaudhary which is one of biggest in nearby area.

Currently, his son is building a 7 crore Dharmshala near the newly established 800+ Bed Narnaul Medical College.

A famous personality, Baba Ramdev, lives in the village (Said Alipur) which is a part of this Sub-division.

== Integrated Multimodel Logistics Hub (IMLH) ==
=== Logistics hub ===
Integrated Multimodel Logistics Hub, Nangal Chaudhary (IMLHNC or IMLH Nangal Chaudhary), 1,100 acre US$3.3. billion project along the railway in Haryana is part of Delhi–Mumbai Industrial Corridor Project (DMIC) on Western Dedicated Freight Corridor (WDFC), that is on track to be completed on time by December 2017 (infrastructure and plot of land ready to be allocated to investors, as of April 2017). Among such investors, Dr. B. Ravi Pillai, owner of RP Group and the richest Indian billionaire in Dubai and Middle East which employ over 70,000 employees, offered to CM of Haryana in December 2017 to invest in logistics company in Integrated Multimodel Logistics Hub, Nangal Chaudhary (North India's largest logistics hub) and in Prime Minister's Housing for All (PMAY) low-cost urban housing in 3 Industrial Model Townships (IMT) along Delhi Western Peripheral Expressway in IMT Bahadurgarh, IMT Kundli, Sonipat and IMT Manesar with construction to be completed within 1 year.

=== Synergy with DMIC ===
The DMIC is a US$100 billion India-Japan state-sponsored industrial development project of the Government of India on the Western Dedicated Freight Corridor (WDFC), aimed at developing 7 Investment Regions of 250 km^{2} and 13 industrial areas across six states (Delhi, Western Uttar Pradesh, Southern Haryana, Eastern Rajasthan, Eastern Gujarat, Western Maharashtra and Madhya Pradesh) in India by boosting major expansion of Infrastructure and Industry, including industrial clusters and rail, road, port and air connectivity in the states along the route of the Corridor. This would open a floodgate of opportunities along several parts of Golden Quadrilateral such as Delhi-Mumbai NH-48, NH-2, NH-1 and NH -10 for developing industrial, urban and supporting infrastructure through public-private initiatives. More than 60% area of Haryana is under DMIC project, which is extended up to 150 km on both sides of the alignment of DMIC.

SPV was incorporated in 2016, GoI granted approval for IMLH on 16 May 2018, 886 acre land identified and 689 Acre transferred to SPV of which litigation free 408 acre land is developed as Phase-1A. In May 2024, state government has completed construction of road, power and water supply, while contractor has completed 95% construction for DFCCIL rail connectivity to the project site, GoI's Public Private Partnership Appraisal Committee (PPPAC) approval application for this Public Private Partnership (PPP) was submitted on 17 April 2025.

Manesar-Bawal-Nangal Chaudhary is one of the investment regions selected for development in the first phase of ambitious DMIC.

- Manesar has more than US$10 billion investment in several large multinational industries, specially from Japan, such as Maruti Suzuki and Toshiba Eco City. Aadhar's national data center is also located here.
- Bawal has been evolved as a mega industrial growth hub where HSIIDC has allotted 78 Industrial manufacturing plots to 78 medium and large scale projects multi-national companies here with capital investment of around US$4.18 billion (2016), including Harley-Davidson, Asahi India, Musashi Auto Parts India, POSCO steel, Kansai Nerolac Paints, YKK, Euothern Hema, Keihin Corporation, Atlas Copco, Ahresty Wilmington Corporation, Caparo Maruti and Haco Group along with many Indian companies such as Omax Corporation, Rico Auto Corporation, Minda Auto Group, Rubyco Modular Furniture International, Tenneco Automotive India, Continental Equipment and Multicolor Steels, Caparo power plant, etc. have set up plants.
- Nangal Chaudhary, with USD$3.3 billion phase-I investment, is North India's largest logistics and warehousing hub.

== Transport ==
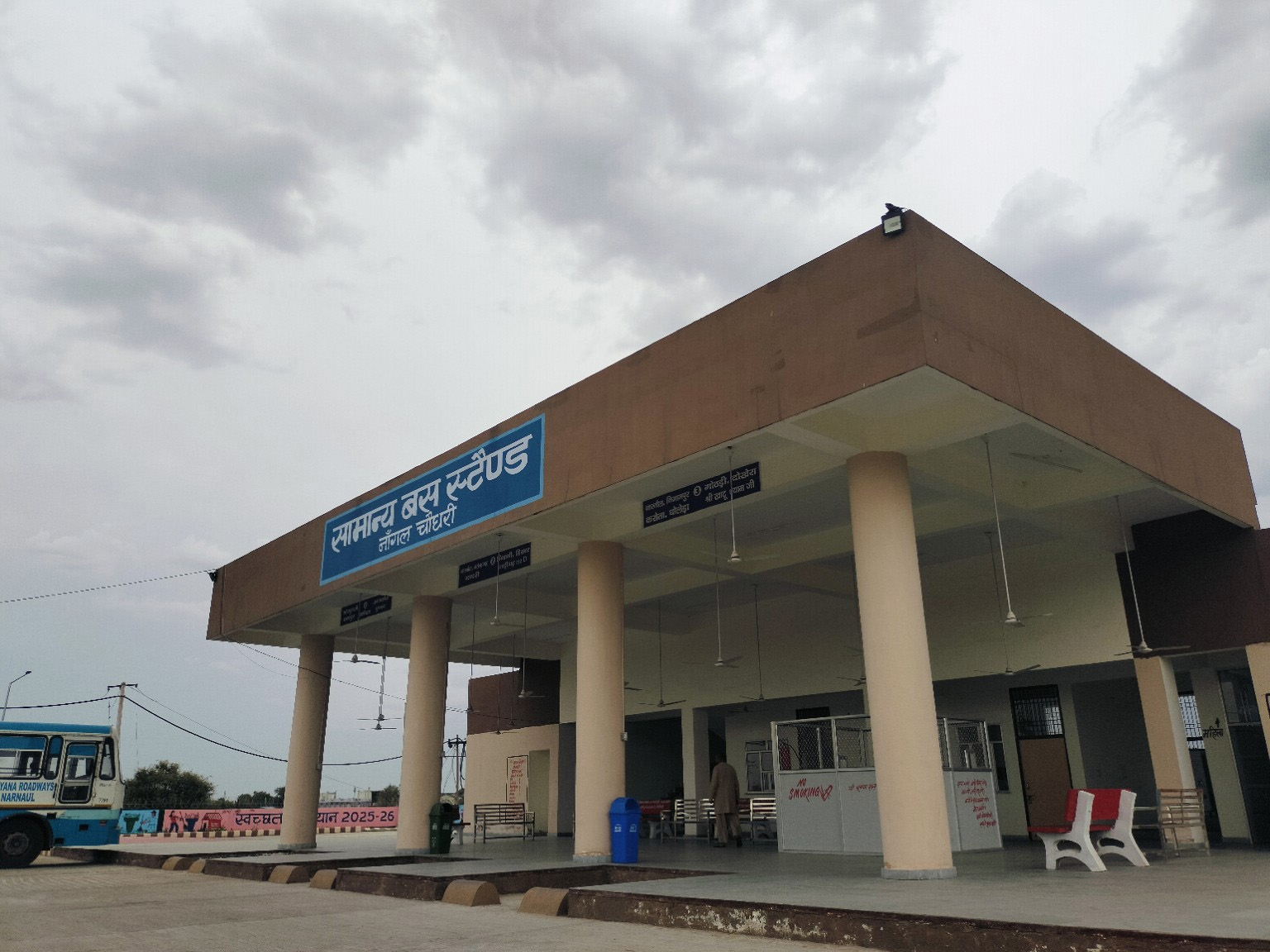
New Bus Stand Nangal Choudhary

New Bus Stand Nangal Choudhary

General information
- Location: Nangal Choudhary–Behror Road, Near 152D Road, Mahendragarh district, Haryana, India; India
- System: Bus station
- Operator: Haryana Roadways
- Platforms: 3

Construction
- Structure type: Standard

History
- Opened: 2025
Location

New Bus Stand Nangal Choudhary is a modern bus terminal located in Nangal Choudhary town of Mahendragarh district in the Indian state of Haryana. It serves as an important hub for Haryana Roadways and improves connectivity in the region.

== History ==
The demand for a permanent bus stand in Nangal Choudhary had existed for several years, as earlier passengers had to wait on roadsides due to the absence of proper facilities.

The foundation stone of the bus stand was laid on 13 November 2017 by the then Chief Minister of Haryana.

After several delays, the construction was completed in 2025 and the bus stand was officially inaugurated in November 2025 by Chief Minister Nayab Singh Saini.

== Features ==
The bus stand is designed with modern infrastructure and includes:

- Three platforms (3-gauge system)
- Passenger waiting area
- Seating and shelter facilities
- Improved traffic management layout

== Connectivity ==
The bus stand connects Nangal Choudhary with several nearby cities and towns, including:

- Narnaul
- Rewari
- Jaipur
- Kotputli
- Mahendragarh
- Bhiwani
- Dadri
- Rohtak
- Ateli
- Bahror
- Delhi
- Kanina

New bus services have also been introduced, including a direct route from Narnaul to Khatu Shyam via Nangal Choudhary.

Another report also confirmed improved regional connectivity through new services.

== Importance ==
The construction of the new bus stand has significantly improved transportation facilities in the region. It has benefited daily commuters, students, and local residents, and has contributed to the development of infrastructure in Nangal Choudhary.

=== Roads ===
Road: Nangal Chaudhary now has 6 lane Road connectivity to Narnaul, Jaipur, Rewari, Gurugram, Chandigarh, Delhi, Ambala. Nangal Choudhary is well connected by road to Kotputli 28 km, Jaipur 138 km, Narnaul 25 km, Behror 30 km, Neem ka Thana 43 km, these and other cities of Haryana and Rajasthan.

Newly declared National Highway No. 148B (6 Lane, Part of Ambala - Narnaul Expressway ) from Rajasthan Border (Kotputli) to Bhatinda (Punjab) passing through Nangal Chaudhary. This Road is currently expanded till New Delhi Mumbai Expressway Near Alwar. Post that Nangal Chaudhary will have 6 lane connectivity to all important Cities and Expressways.

Recent road development in the district has improved the connectivity of Nangal Chaudhary significantly and made travel much faster as it connected it to all nearby cities and towns with either 4 lane or 6 lane expressways. It was made possible to reach Delhi and Jaipur in 2.25 hours and Chandigarh in 4 hrs. Nangal Choudhary has 3 side Ring Road also which have ease traffic in the main city.

=== Bus ===
New Bus Stand Nangal Choudhary Narnaul, Nizampur, Mohindergarh, Jaipur and Kotputli connected through a bus network. After newly built NH-152D (Trans-Haryana Expressway) from which connectivity to Chandigarh, Ambala, Jammu, Amritsar, Jalandhar, Sangrur has increased.

=== Rail ===
Railway: Narnaul 22 km and Nizampur 14 km, is located on the Delhi-Ringas-Abu Road-Ahmedabad-Mumbai railway track. Only seven trains run on this section. The track is a part of Western Dedicated Freight Corridor. Government of India have confirmed proposal to develop IMLH at Nangal Chaudhary under DMICDC project, this will stimulate industrial growth in the region. Recently, Govt. of India have conducted survey for a new railway line from Jhajjar (Haryana) to Khairthal (Rajasthan) through Kanina, Narnaul, Nangal Chaudhary, Behror. If, this railway project finalised then Nangal Chaudhary city will have its Railway Station.

=== Airport ===
Airport: Indra Gandhi International Airport, Delhi is the nearest international and domestic airport; the second nearest international and domestic airport is Jaipur. Bacchod Airstrip is the nearest airport at 25 km.

=== Distances to cities ===
Distances to cities: Mahendragarh 47 km, Rewari 76 km, Behror 25 km, Narnaul 22 km, Alwar 80 km, Jhunjhunu 90 km, Gurgaon 110 km, Delhi 140 km, Jaipur 138 km, Chandigarh 397 km.

=== Tourist Place ===
Place in Nangal Choudhary

- FunGram Resort
- MuddGram Home Stay,

Located in nearby nangal choudhary, village Bamanwas kheta, is a recreational destination in the region.

== Temple and Goshala ==
Temples in Nangal Choudhary:-

- Baba Mukandas Mandir
- Sudha Bhua Ji Mandir
- Shyam Baba Mandir
- Sahid Baba Mandir, Ganwari Jat
- Baba Bakshidas Mandir ( Said Alipur)
- Aarya sabha ( Said Alipur)
- Mata Aasawari Mandir (Nangal Choudhary)

Nangal Chaudhary has one of largest Goshala in nearby areas and it is well maintained through a trust.

== Resources ==
In the vicinity of the village, limestone is found in the riverbed of Krishnawati river and village Dostpur. There are mines of various ores. In village Gulawala, quartz (Phelsphar) is found in hills. In neighboring village Aantri Biharipur, some other rare stones are found. In Nizampur, the iron ore is present in abundance. Recently, illegal stone crushers mushroomed in and around this constituency.

== See also ==
- List of cities in Haryana by population
