= Surana =

Surana may refer to:

- Surana, Mahendragarh, a village in Haryana, India
- Surana, Bhopal, a village in Madhya Pradesh, India
