= Khizar =

KHIZAR PIZAR

== People ==
- Khizar Khan Niazi, ancestor of all Khizarkhel clan of Pashtun tribe Niazi.
- Khizar Hayat, Malaysian cricketer
- Khizar Muazzam Khan, Pakistani-American lawyer
- Sir Khizar Hayat Tiwana, Punjabi politician

== Places ==
- Khwaja Khizr Tomb at Sonipat

== Other ==
- Khidr, a figure in the Quran also known as Khizar
