= Niwaj Nagar =

- village
- Country: India
- State: Haryana
- District: Mahendra Garh

Population
  - Total: 2,500

Languages
  - Official: Hindi
- Time zone: UTC+5:30 (IST)
- PIN: 123001
- ISO 3166 code: IN-HR
- Vehicle registration: HR
- Nearest city: Narnaul
- Lok Sabha constituency: Bhiwani- Mahendragarh Lok Sabha seat
- Vidhan Sabha constituency: Narnaul assembly constituency
- Website: haryana.gov.in

Niwaj Nagar is a village in the subdivision Narnaul of the Mahendragarh District in the Indian state of Haryana. It is approximately 5 kilometers from Narnaul and is connected by road. Narnaul is approximately 150 km from New Delhi, the capital of India. It has a well-established government high school by the name of Lala Murlidhar High School, a small market, two temples and a community center (Tayal Dharamshala). Munish Kumar Raizada, a neonatologist is also from the village, and his ancestors were the founders of the village. He has started the Mission India Foundation (MIF) for the benefit of society and from time to time, vaccination programs are organised by him. Munish Kumar Raizada also contested from New Delhi Assembly Constituency (AC 40) in 2025 Delhi Assembly Election.

== Adjacent villages ==
- Hazipur- 1.2 km
- Mandlana village 1.5 km
- Bani- 2.3 km
- Housing Boarding- 2.7 km
- NASIBPUR Village Near by Narnaul- 3 km
- NOONI MOUNTAINS RANGE- 3.7 km
- Village- Raghunathpura (Khalar)- 4.7 km
- DOHAN RIVER (way to Manaash Jat's Tubewell Baproli)- 5.3 km
- River of Dhohana Pachici- 7.2 km
- Nihaloth- 7.6 km
