= Nabha House =

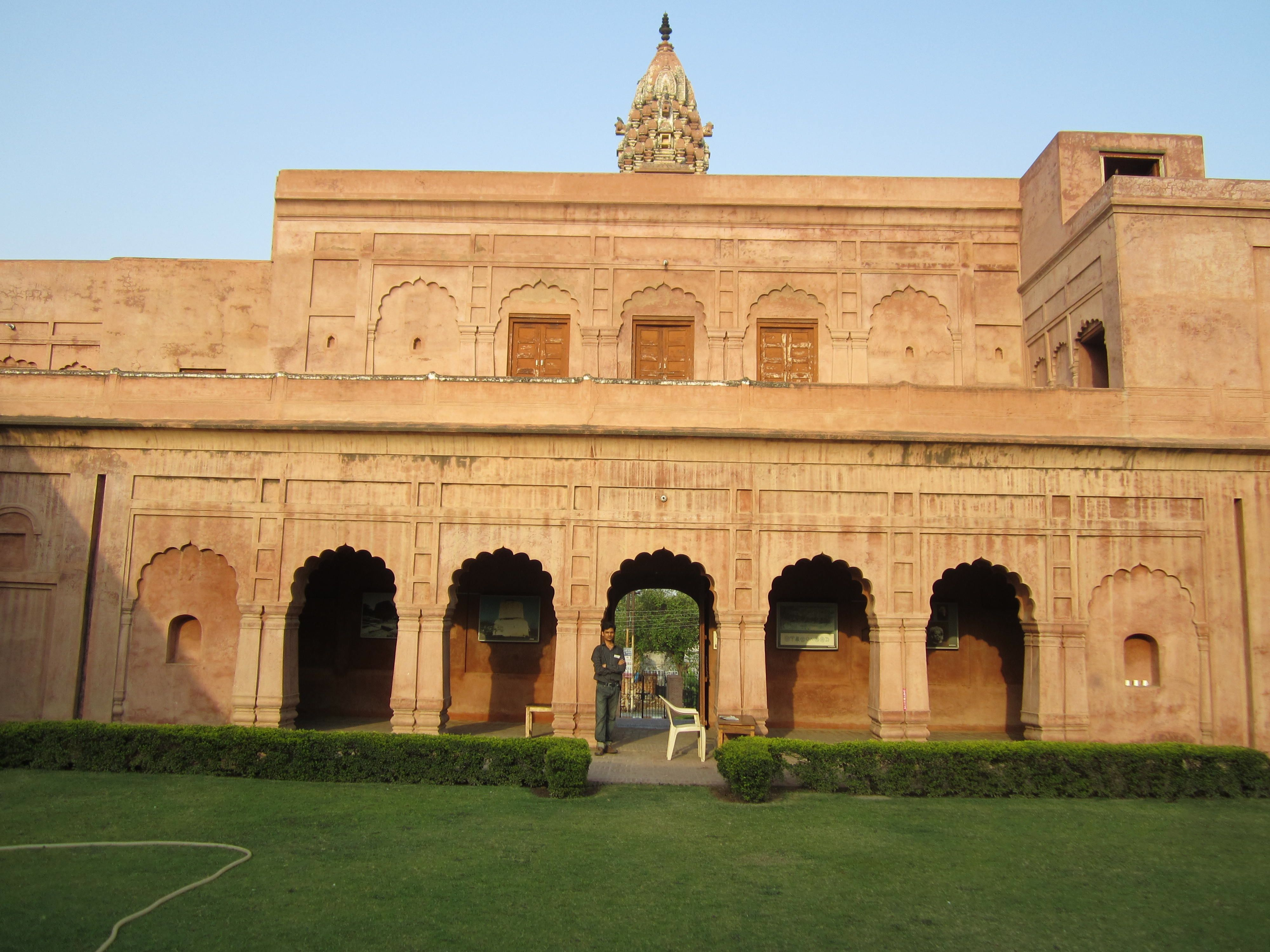

- Location within Haryana Location within India
- Location: Kurukshetra, Haryana, India

History
- Built: 1800s
- Built for: Maharaja Hira Singh
- Demolished: 1857

Site notes
- Architectural style: Hindu
- Restored: 2005 onwards
- Restored by: Archaeological Survey of India
- Governing body: Archaeological Survey of India

Nabha House is a palatial building which was used by the royal family of Nabha as residence for the days religious performances were being done at Kurukshetra. It was adopted by Archaeological Survey of India in 2005 and they worked 9 years, spending close to INR 1.5 crore to bring it back to its original form.

== Architecture ==
The entire Nabha House is built on a raised platform. The eastern side of the house has the main entrance gate. The door is made of wood and iron nails are used to decorate it. Both the sides of the gate are well decorated with four Miharab. The gate takes the visitor into a rectangular yard. The second floor of the house also has two pillared windows. At the top of the monuments, a 15 feet temple is built which is dedicated to Brahma.

== History ==
It is believed that Nabha House was built by Maharaja Hira Singh. It was built as residence for kings who would come to Sannhit Sarovar to take bath during solar eclipses. After independence, the Nabha House was used as space for government school and then for an Ayurveda college. Nabha House was also used as classrooms and office space by Kurukshetra University in 1957 to 1959.

== See also ==
- Nabha House (Delhi)
