= Harsh Ka Tila =

- Interactive map of Harsh Ka Tila
- Type: Protected Monument
- Coordinates: 29°58′35.787″N 76°49′28.19″E
- Area: 1kmx750 m
- Architect: Raja Harshvardhan
- Governing body: Archaeological Survey Of India

The archaeological excavations located on the outskirts of the city of Kurukshetra. Kurukshetra, District : Kurukshetra, Adjacent to Sheikh Chilli's Tomb, Excavation revealed antiquities from first millennium BCE to 19th century related to Vedic & Late Vedic periods, and at least six other subsequent cultural and historical periods. Site was abandoned after the vedic period in the first millennium BCE, then continuously inhabited from 1st century CE to 19th century. The site, spread over an area of 1 km x750 m x 23 m, contains historical remnants belonging to vedic as well as six continuously inhabited post-vedic periods ranging from Kushan to Mughal era.

== Excavation site ==
The partially excavated site, located north of Thanesar and accessible by road, is 1km long x 750m wide x 23m high. Northeast corner of the site has a caravanserai and Sheikh Chilli's Tomb. This site was excavated by Shri B.M.Pandey of Archaeological Survey of India for 4 continuous seasons from 1987-88 to 1990-91.

== Findings ==
Chronologically, oldest to the newest, the following cultures were found:

- Vedic period (1300-300 BCE: shards of Painted Grey Ware culture (PGW, usually associated with the vedic period of Mahabharata).
- Late Vedic period (700-200 BCE): shards of plain grey (Northern Black Polished Ware).
- Kushan period (39-375 CE): pottery culture found includes typical Kushan red ware as well as associated moulded bright red slipped ware and Polished Red Ware (PRW). The square structure made of a baked bricks, copper coins, terracotta seals with Brahmi inscriptions, terracotta figurines of human and animals, terracotta plaques a, copper coins, bone and ivory artifacts, bangles made of shell, and metal objects were also found.
- Gupta period (4th to 6th century CE): Polished Red Ware, bright red slipped and plain red wares pottery of daily use utensils such as footed bowls and sprinklers. Other finds include broken stone statue of Lord Vishnu, terracotta plaque depicting a couple in sexual position, casting mould for making human head, terracotta figures of humans and animals, seals with Brahmi inscription, human and animal figurines, beads, copper and iron artifacts.
- Post-Gupta or Vardhan period of Pushyabhuti dynasty (6th century to 7th century CE): multi-room complex, statue of Kubera, broken inscription. Polished Red Ware and red ware, terracotta artifacts, ivory and shell were also found. Associated with the post-Gupta period include polished redware.
- Rajput period (8th to 12th century CE) i.e. Gurjara-Pratihara dynasty (8-12 century CE), Tomara dynasty (8-11 century CE) & Chauhan Dynasty (12th century CE): two rooms, which were part of a larger complex, in Pratihara architecture style with the evidence of stairs in the form of optional grooves in the corner of the room were found. Charred wooden doorframes and remains of fire on all walls indicate that the building collapsed due to the fire. Fragments of statues from Pratihara period but also found. The pottery culture finds include medium fabric red ware with decorations of concentric circles, floral & net-shapes stamped on them. Several hundred clay tablets with incised impressions of three vertical and oblique lines.
- Sultanate period (13th to 16th century CE): On the western side of the mound, ruins of residential building with a large circular bastion and a smaller bastion for phone which showed the sign of being in use in the subsequent periods as well. Pottery finds include red ware and glazed ware. Other artifacts found where copper coins, terracotta figurines of animal and humans, beads made from semi-precious stones, iron and copper equipment.
- Mughal period (16th to 19th century CE: building complex with residential area, hall, a big arched structure, staircases, streets, a well, garden complex and bastions, etc in Mughal architectural style. Mughal garden complex is based on the charbagh pattern. Pottery cultural finds include the glazed ware, grey ware, stone ware and sherds of Chinese porcelain with floral designs and chinese language inscriptions. The stairs inside might've been built later on, the Chamber in it is quite wide and spherical on the top. Just as compartments are created for horses in the stable, Delhi's zoo comprises a similar structure for the elephants.

The major discovery of the post-Gupta period is represented by brick structures associated with 'Red Polished Ware' including a Mughal period garden complex on the Charbagh pattern.

== Gallery ==
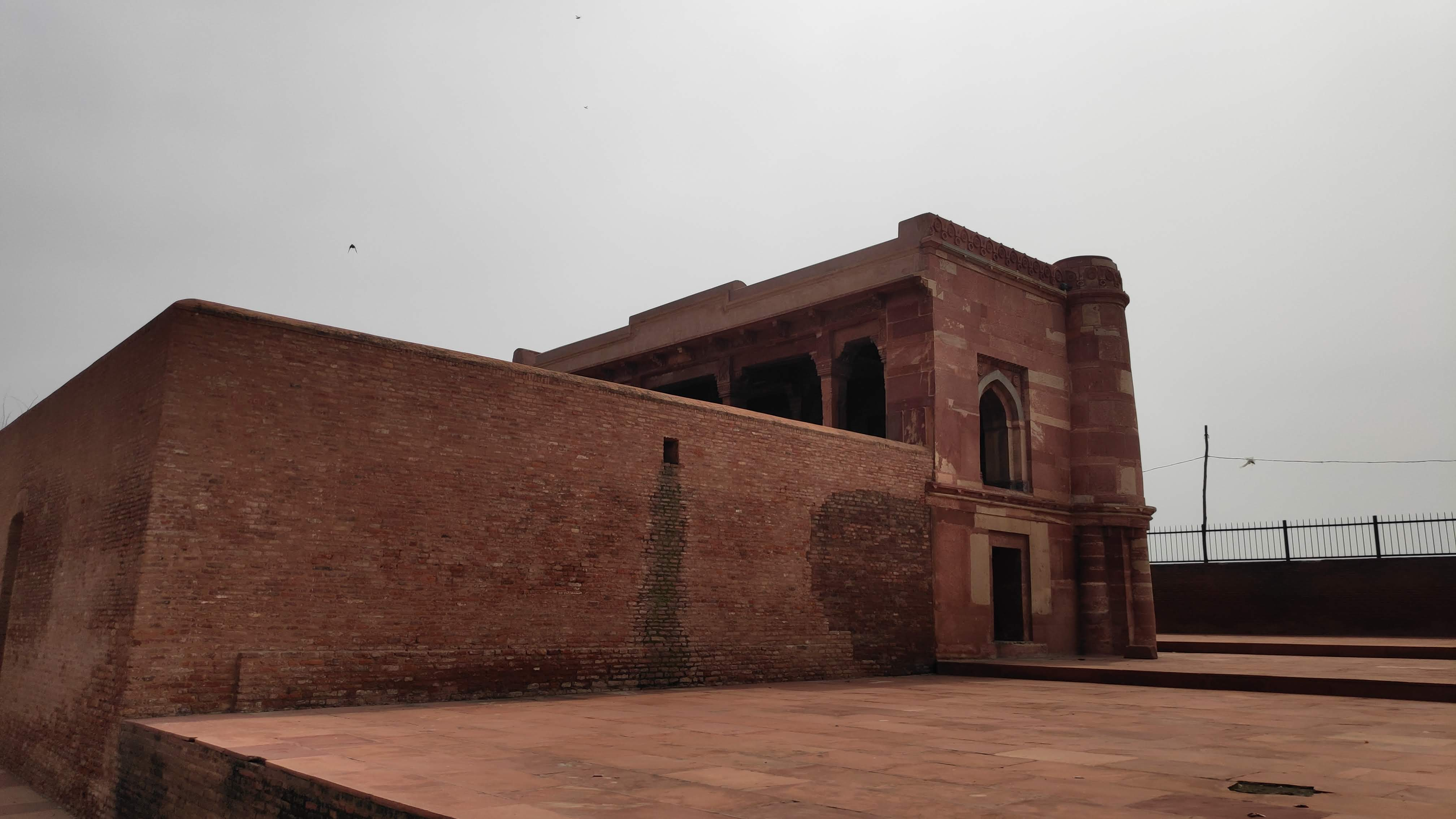

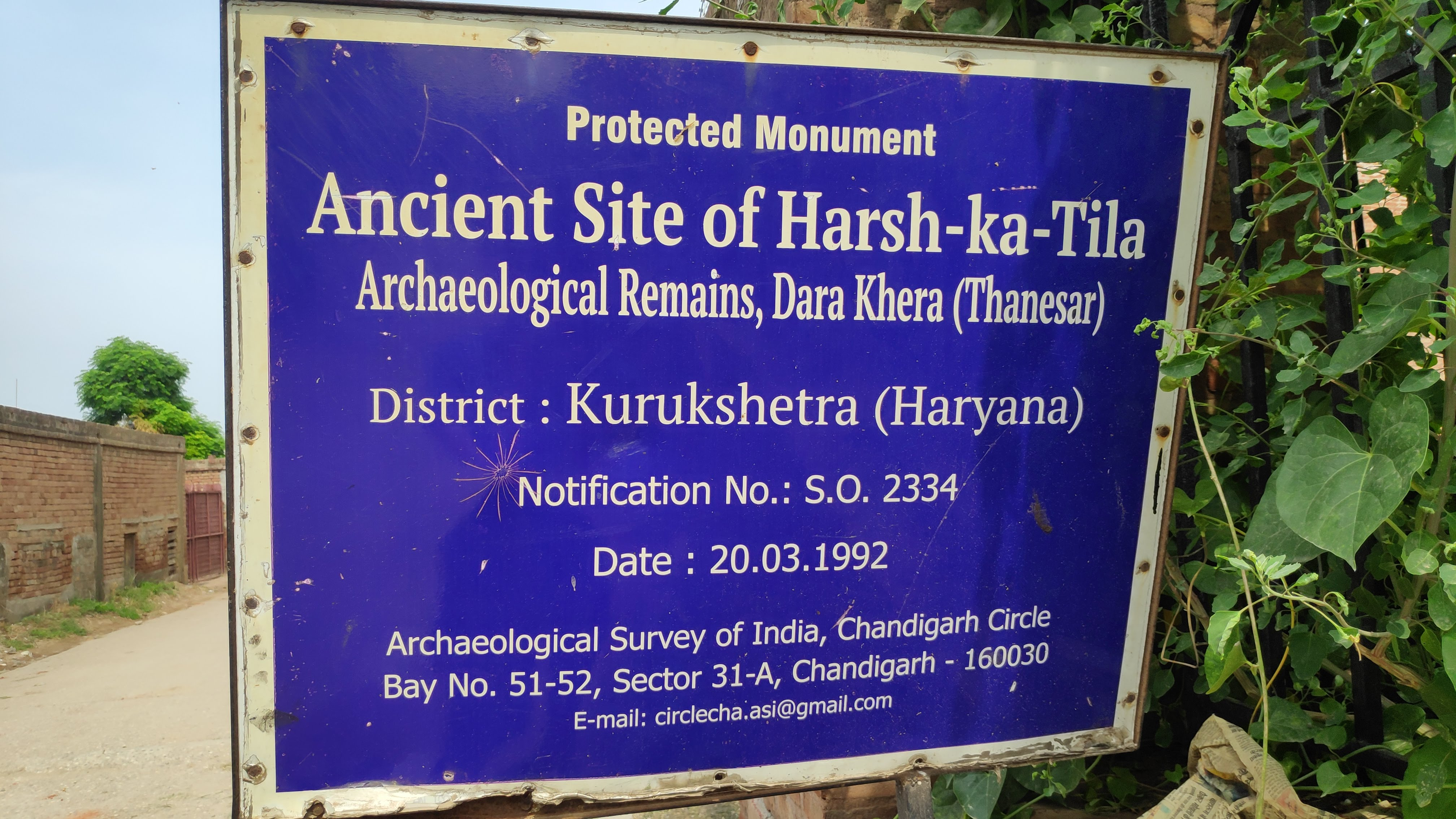

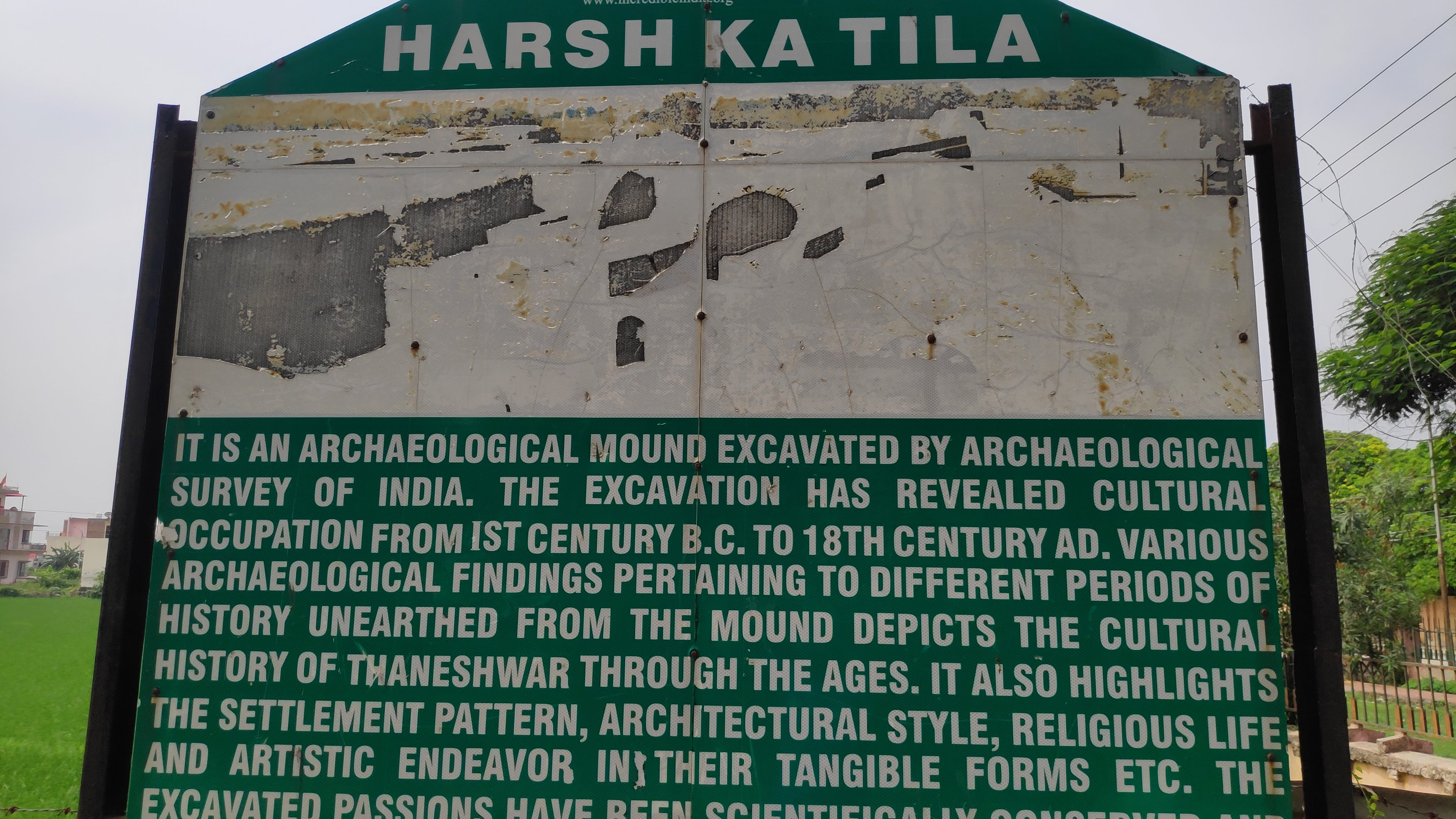

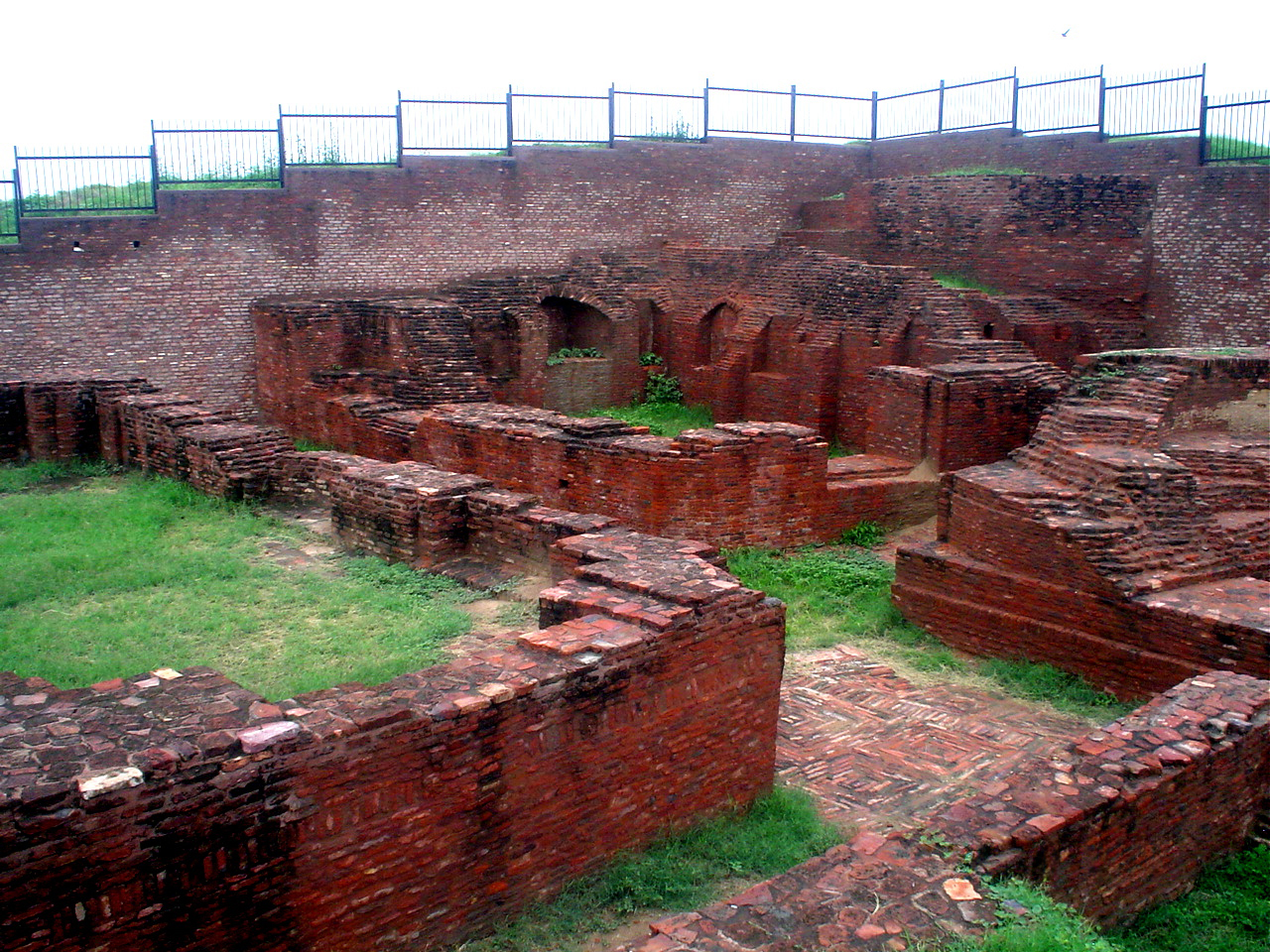

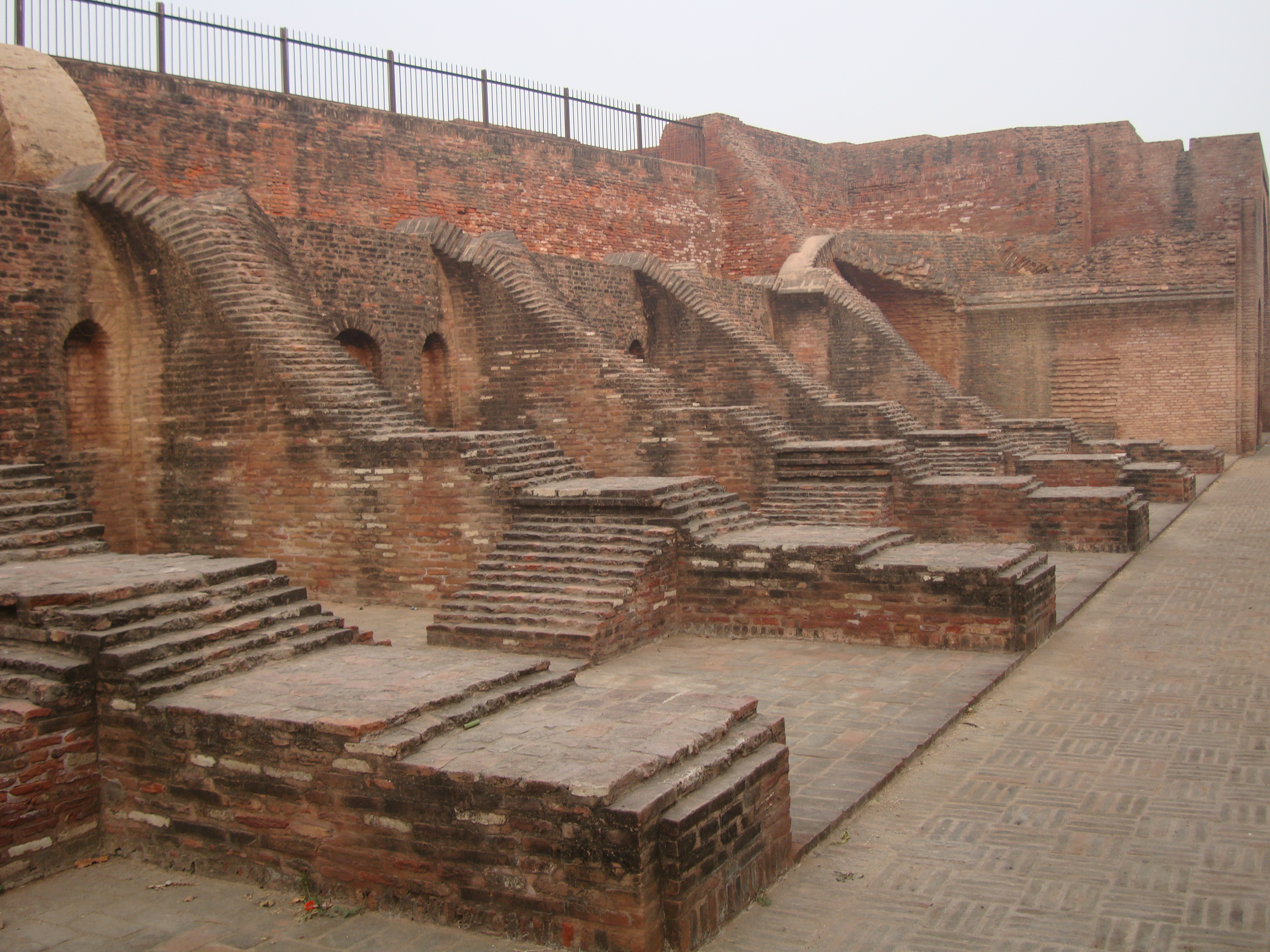

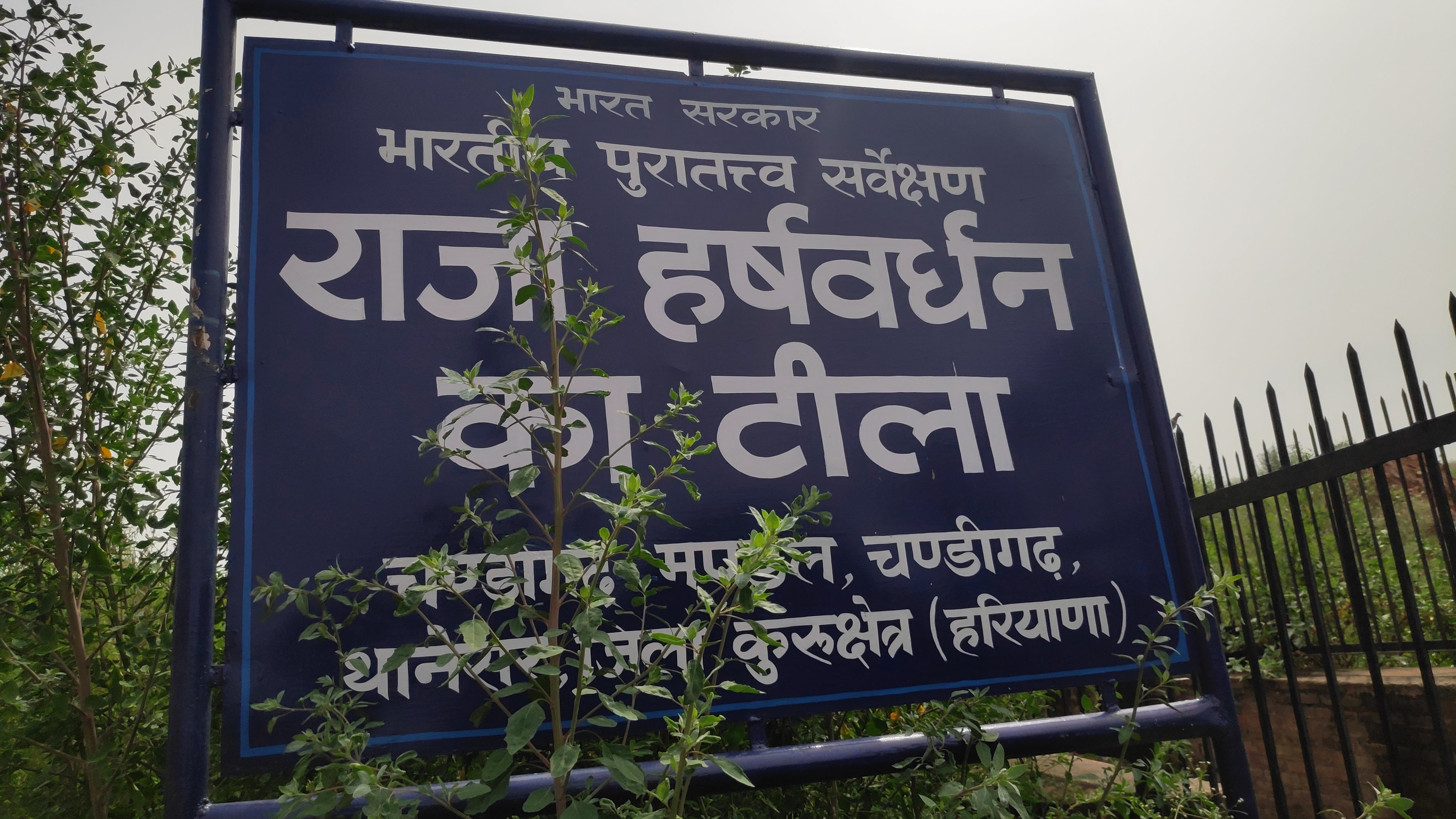

== See also ==
- Karn ka Tila, in the vicinity
- List of Monuments of National Importance in Haryana
- List of State Protected Monuments in Haryana
- List of Indus Valley Civilization sites
- List of National Parks & Wildlife Sanctuaries of Haryana, India
