= Karnal Mughal Bridge =

Historic bridge in India

The Mughal Bridge, at Karnal in Haryana state of India, was built during the reign of Shah Jahan and it is mentioned in Jahangir's memoirs of Tuzk-e-Jahangiri.

== History ==
The bridge was laid out by Shah Jahan. It is an example of Mughal architecture. The bridge was used to facilitate travelers during the 17th Century and locally called Badshahi Pul. This bridge is also known as 'Old Badshahi Bridge'.This bridge was built around 1540-44 AD.Its situated near National Highway number 1.

== Architecture ==
Its structurally sound bridge consisting of three arches made up of stone. There are four domed shaped tops strengthened by buttresses and arches on either sides. This bridge is protected by Haryana Government but still in dilapidated condition.

== See also ==
- Grand Trunk Road
- Haryana Tourism
- History of Haryana
- List of Monuments of National Importance in Haryana
- List of State Protected Monuments in Haryana
- List of protected areas of Haryana
