= Thanesar Pathar Mosque =

Former mosque in Haryana, India

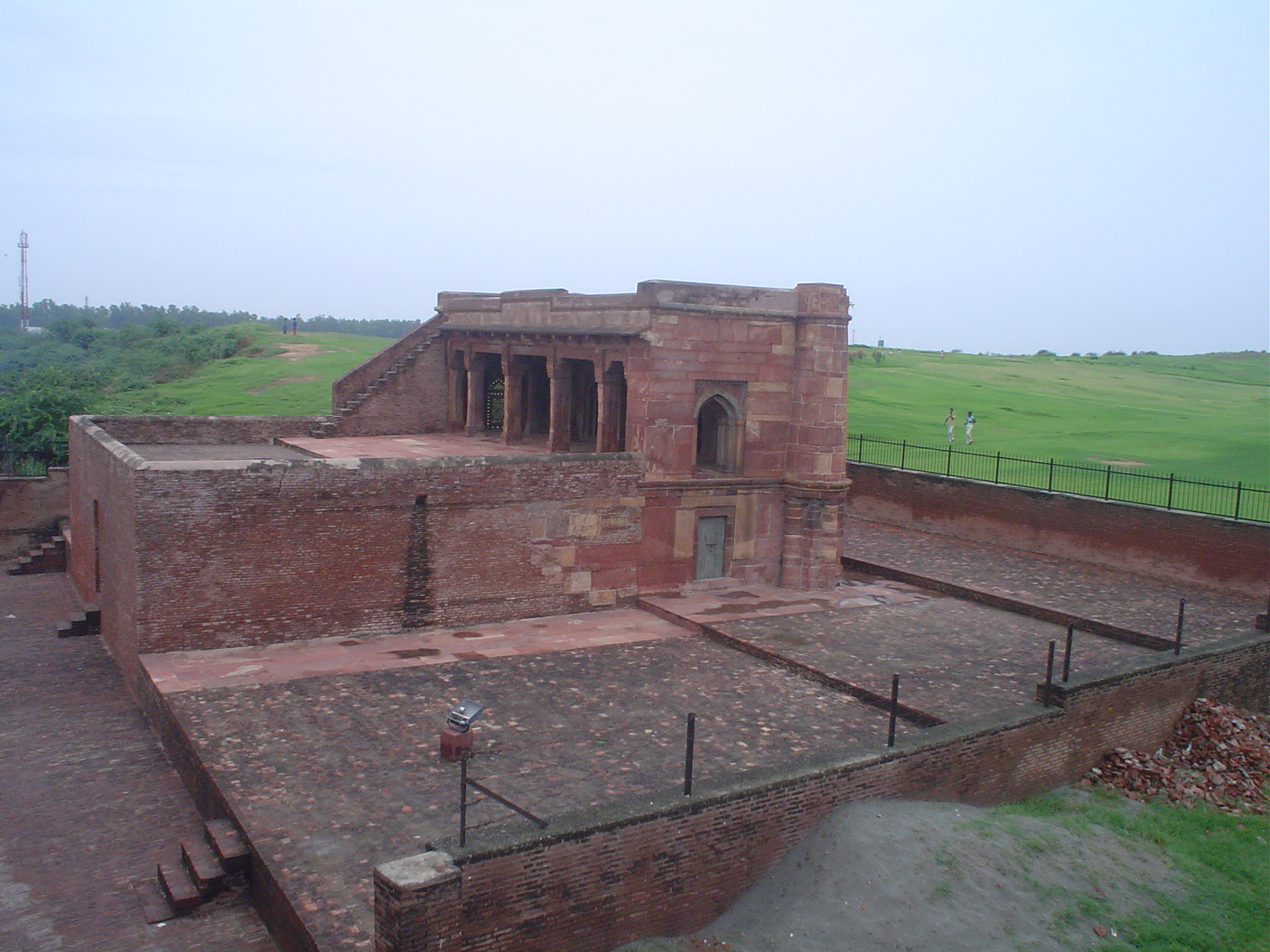
- Partial ruins of the mosque, in 2008

- Location of the former mosque in Haryana

Religion
- Affiliation: Islam (former)
- Ecclesiastical or organisational status: Mosque (former); Historical monument
- Status: Abandoned (partial ruinous state)

Location
- Location: Thanesar, Haryana
- Coordinates: 29°58′33″N 76°49′32″E

Architecture
- Type: Mosque architecture
- Style: Mughal architecture
- Completed: 17th century

Specifications
- Minarets: Two (maybe more) (Now in partial ruins)
- Materials: Red sandstone

Monument of National Importance
- Official name: Thanesar Pathar Mosque
- Reference no.: N-HR-57

The Thanesar Pathar Mosque, also known as the Pathar Masjid, is a former mosque and now historical monument, located in Thanesar, in the state of Haryana, India. Believed to be built in 17th century, the mosque is located in the Kurukshetra district and is a Monument of National Importance.

== History ==
The mosque was completed in the 17th century, during the reign of Jahangir. It is a small building made out of red sandstone in the Mughal architecture style. The fluted minarets are attached to the back walls. The ceiling that rests on pillars is decorated by carved floral designs. It is situated near the tomb of Sheikh Chilli.

== See also ==
- Islam in India
- List of mosques in India
- List of Monuments of National Importance in Haryana
