= Surana, Mahendragarh =

Village in Haryana, India

Coordinates: 25°15′N 72°08′E

Surana is a small village with a population of 865 in 2011, situated 6 kilometres from Narnaul, Haryana, India.
