= Gharuanda Gateways of Old Mughal Sarai =

Feroz Khan built the Sarai (Rest House) in 1637 AD during the reign of Mughal emperor Shah Jahan; hence it was named after the Mughals. Before the first battle of Panipat, Babur camped at Gharaunda. Now, there are two existing gateways in the area. They exist within a distance of about 100 meters from each other. The Sarai has a quadrangular shape, with cells on all four sides. Existing gateways form a part of the Northern and Southern walls, and both of them have three stories. The gateways are made of ‘Lakhauri’ bricks and decorated with panels, balconies, rounded towers, and angular flutes.

== See also ==
- List of Monuments of National Importance in Haryana
