= Fattupur =

- Village
- Country: India
- State: Punjab
- District: Gurdaspur
- Tehsil: Dera Baba Nanak
- Region: Majha

Government
  - Type: Panchayat raj
  - Body: Gram panchayat

Area
  - Total: 187 ha (460 acres)

Population (2011)
  - Total: 946; 521/425 ♂/♀
  - Scheduled Castes: 265; 141/124 ♂/♀
  - Total Households: 161

Languages
  - Official: Punjabi
- Time zone: UTC+5:30 (IST)
- Telephone: 01871
- ISO 3166 code: IN-PB
- Website: gurdaspur.nic.in

Fattupur is a village in Dera Baba Nanak in Gurdaspur district of Punjab State, India. It is located 10 kilometres (6.2 mi) from sub district headquarter and 34 kilometres (21 mi) from district headquarter. The village is administrated by Sarpanch an elected representative of the village.

== Demography ==
As of 2011, the village has a total number of 161 houses and a population of 946 of which 521 are males while 425 are females. According to the report published by Census India in 2011, out of the total population of the village 265 people are from Schedule Caste and the village does not have any Schedule Tribe population so far.

== See also ==
- List of villages in India
