= Ashoka Lat of Feroz Shah =

Pillar in Fatehabad, Haryana, India

Ashoka Lat of Feroz Shah is a pillar (lat means Pillar in Urdu) located in Fatehabad, Haryana. The height of the pillar is 6 metres. This pillar is believed to be the lower part of the original pillar that was erected by Ashoka in Hansi. As was the tradition to demolish existing Hindu temple and architecture and use the debris to erect new monument (another example are sections at Qutub Minar) - Feroz Shah also took a part of the original pillar and planted it at Fatehabad. However, the Ashokan epigraph was chiseled out and new Tughlaq inscriptions were engraved. The inscriptions are the genealogy of Firoz Shah. It is believed to be planted in 1351-88 AD.
