= Jarasandha ka Qila =

Ancient archaeological site in India

Jarasandha Ka Qila (Fort of Jarasandha) is an ancient site protected by Archaeological Survey of India, that is located in village Asandh (40 km away from Karnal). The Qila is actually a Stupa which has a height of more than 25 metre and is bigger than Sanchi Stupa. It is also known as Asandh Stupa or Kushna Stupa since it belongs to the Kushna period. Many relics, pottery and coins belonging to Kushna period were found here.

== Structure ==
The monument has a circular drum with an elongated dome. The core of the structure was filled with earth and brickbats that formed the spokes between the walls. There were in total of 44 courses of a circular wall that were present. The bricks used to create the stupa were sized approximately 34 to 35.5 cm x 5 to 6.

== See also ==
- Jarasandh
