= Manju Choudhary =

Indian politician

Member of Haryana Legislative Assembly
- Incumbent
- Assumed office 8 October 2024
- Preceded by: Abhe Singh Yadav
- Constituency: Nangal Chaudhry

Personal details
- Party: Indian National Congress
- Profession: Politician

Manju Choudhary is an Indian politician from Haryana. He is a Member of the Haryana Legislative Assembly from 2024, representing Nangal Chaudhry Assembly constituency as a member of the Indian National Congress.

== See also ==
- 2024 Haryana Legislative Assembly election
- Haryana Legislative Assembly
