= Choron ki Baoli =

Stepwell in Maham, India

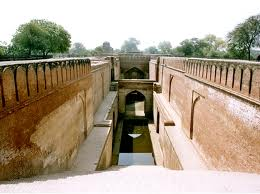
The Choron ki baoli in Maham, India

The Shahjahan ki baoli, more commonly known as the Choron ki baoli, is a baoli in Maham, Haryana, India. The structure, which was built during the reign of Emperor Shah Jahan, collects and holds rainwater for use by the nearby town of Maham. While no longer in mainstay use, the baoli has been persevered as a tourist attraction.

== History ==
=== Background ===
Due to the infrequent nature of rainstorms in Haryana, water-gathering and holding structures known as stepwells or baoli were constructed to capture rainwater for agricultural and domestic use. The water reserves stored by stepwells like the Choron ki baoli aided in conserving water during long periods of droughts. As such, many similar structures were built in Northwestern India.

The Choron ki baoli was built in the town of Maham between the years 1658-1659 on the orders of Saidu Kala, a local official. Kala was a member of the Rajastani Chobdar caste and a vassal of Emperor Shah Jahan of the Mughal Empire, who was himself a great patron of architecture. The stepwell built in Maham was intended to alleviate some of the effects of the seasonal drought the town suffered through. In addition, some sources state that treasures looted during the Mughal army's wars were intended to be hidden inside the baoli and in the surrounding area.

=== Description ===
The structure itself contains three separate chambers in which to hold increasing amounts of water; as rain was collected by the structure, one level at a time would be filled. A total of 101 steps lead down to the lowest point of the reservoir. In addition to holding water, rooms were built within and around the stepwell to house travelers and passersby. The entire project was constructed out of bricks and kankar (cement) blocks.

As of 2018, the structure has decayed, with some of its original carvings and inscriptions having been worn away.

== See also ==
- Stepwells of India
  - Rani ki vav, UNESCO heritage listed
  - Stepwells of Delhi & Haryana
  - List of stepwells in India by states
