= Abhe Singh Yadav =

Indian politician

Member of Haryana Legislative Assembly
- In office 2014–2024
- Preceded by: Bahadur Singh
- Succeeded by: Manju Choudhary
- Constituency: Nangal Chaudhry

Personal details
- Born: 15 March 1960 (age 66) Dhani Mamraj, East Punjab India
- Party: Bharatiya Janata Party
- Spouse: Mrs Kala Yadav
- Parent: Rao Sheo Karan Singh (father)
- Education: M.A (Eng), L.L.M Ph.D (Law)
- Occupation: Social worker

Abhe Singh Yadav is a member of the Haryana Legislative Assembly from the BJP who represented the Nangal Chaudhry Vidhan Sabha constituency in Haryana. In the March 2021 Haryana Assembly Session, Abhe Singh Yadav was awarded Best MLA award in Haryana Assembly along with Varun Chaudhary from INC. He is a mass Ahir Leader of south Haryana. He was an ex. IAS officer and served as Faridabad HUDA administrator in his service.
