= Sahdev =

Sahdev is an Indian name. Notable people with the name include:

- Gireesh Sahdev, Indian actor
- Nakul Sahdev, actor
- Piyush Sahdev, Indian actor
- Sahdev Prasad Yadav, Indian politician
- Sahdev Singh Pundir, Indian politician
- Vaishali Sahdev, birth name of Indian actress Meher Vij
