= Cantonment Church Tower =

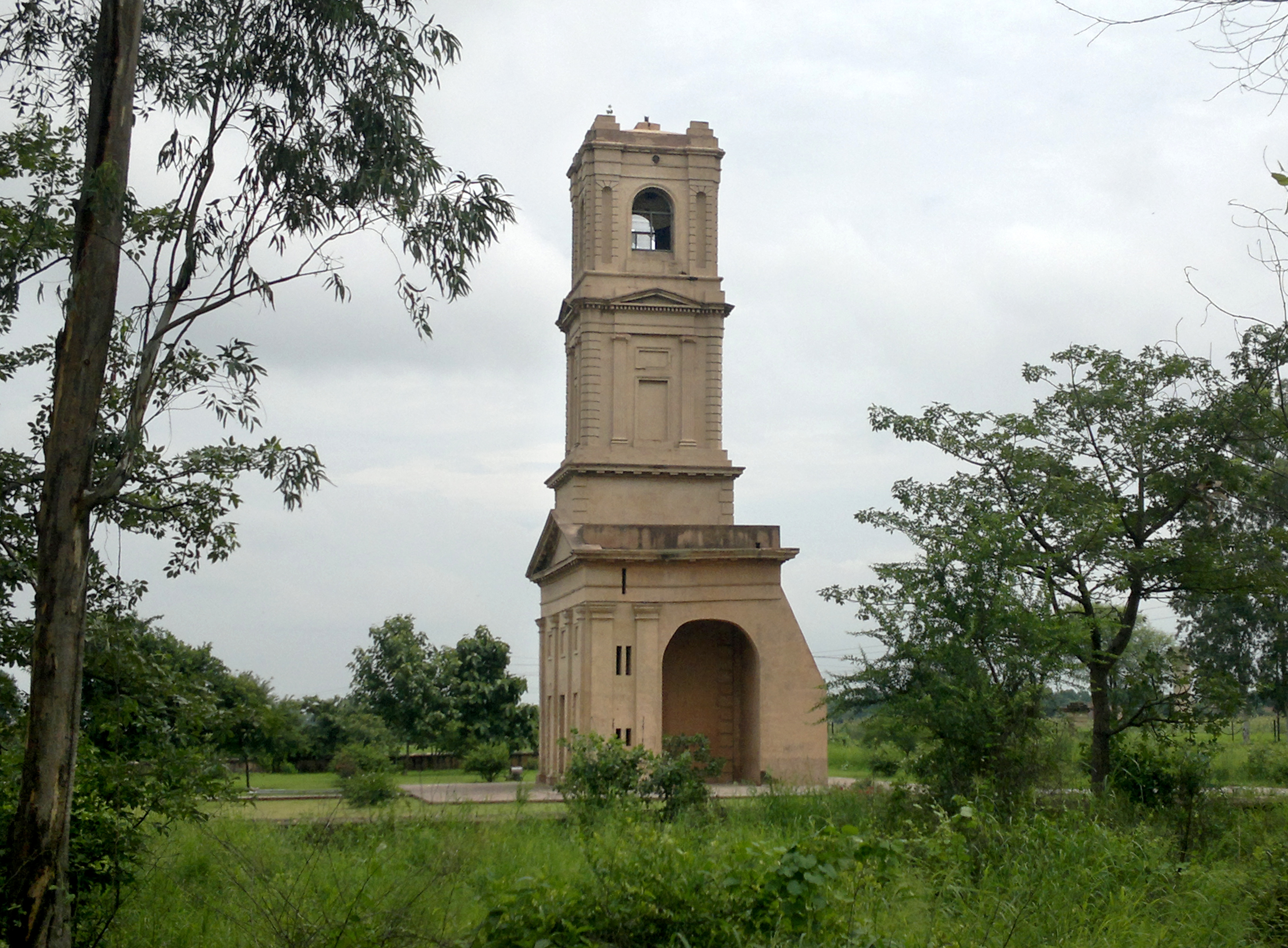
- Cantonment Church Tower, in 2012
- Cantonment Church Tower
- 29°42′22″N 76°59′14″E
- Address: G.T. Road, Karnal, Haryana -132001
- Country: India
- Previous denomination: Anglican

History
- Former name: St. James' Church
- Status: Church (former); Church tower
- Founded: 1806 (Church)
- Dedication: James, brother of Jesus

Architecture
- Functional status: Abandoned (church); Religious shrine
- Heritage designation: Indian National Trust for Art and Cultural Heritage
- Architectural type: Church (former)
- Years built: 1806 – 1925
- Closed: 1841 (Church)
- Demolished: 1841 (Church)

The Cantonment Church Tower is a church tower that was formerly part of St. James' Church, a former Anglican church, located in Karnal city of Haryana, India.

The 35-metre (115 ft) tower was built as an addition to the former church that was founded in 1806, and is now an historical religious shrine in Karnal. The tower stands near National Highway 1 of India and is listed by the Indian National Trust for Art and Cultural Heritage as an historical monument. The Cantonment Church Tower is administered by Archaeological Survey of India and the All India Christian Council.

== History ==
With the establishment of British cantonment at Karnal, St. James' Church was constructed in 1806 by the British. In 1841, when the cantonment was shifted to Ambala, the church was dismantled, but the tower was allowed to stay as it had been built out of the subscriptions of the public who objected to its dismantlement. It was built to meet the challenge of rising power of the Sikh military in the region.

== Architecture ==
The tower has four storeys and on the first storey, Etruscan pilaster has been used. The top storey has a semi-circular dome and the complete exterior is plastered with lime and has fine panelling work with different designs and patterns. The tower is surmounted by an ornamental cross and can be seen from a distance of 7 kilometres (4.3 mi).

== Graveyard ==
A graveyard of soldiers is located on the left side of the Cantonment Church Tower and on the right side is a graveyard of Indian Christians.
