= Banchari =

Village in India

Coordinates: 27.934°N 77.351°E

Banchari is a village in the mandal of Hodal, Palwal district, Haryana state, India.
