= Jal Mahal (Narnaul) =

Palace in Narnaul, Haryana, India

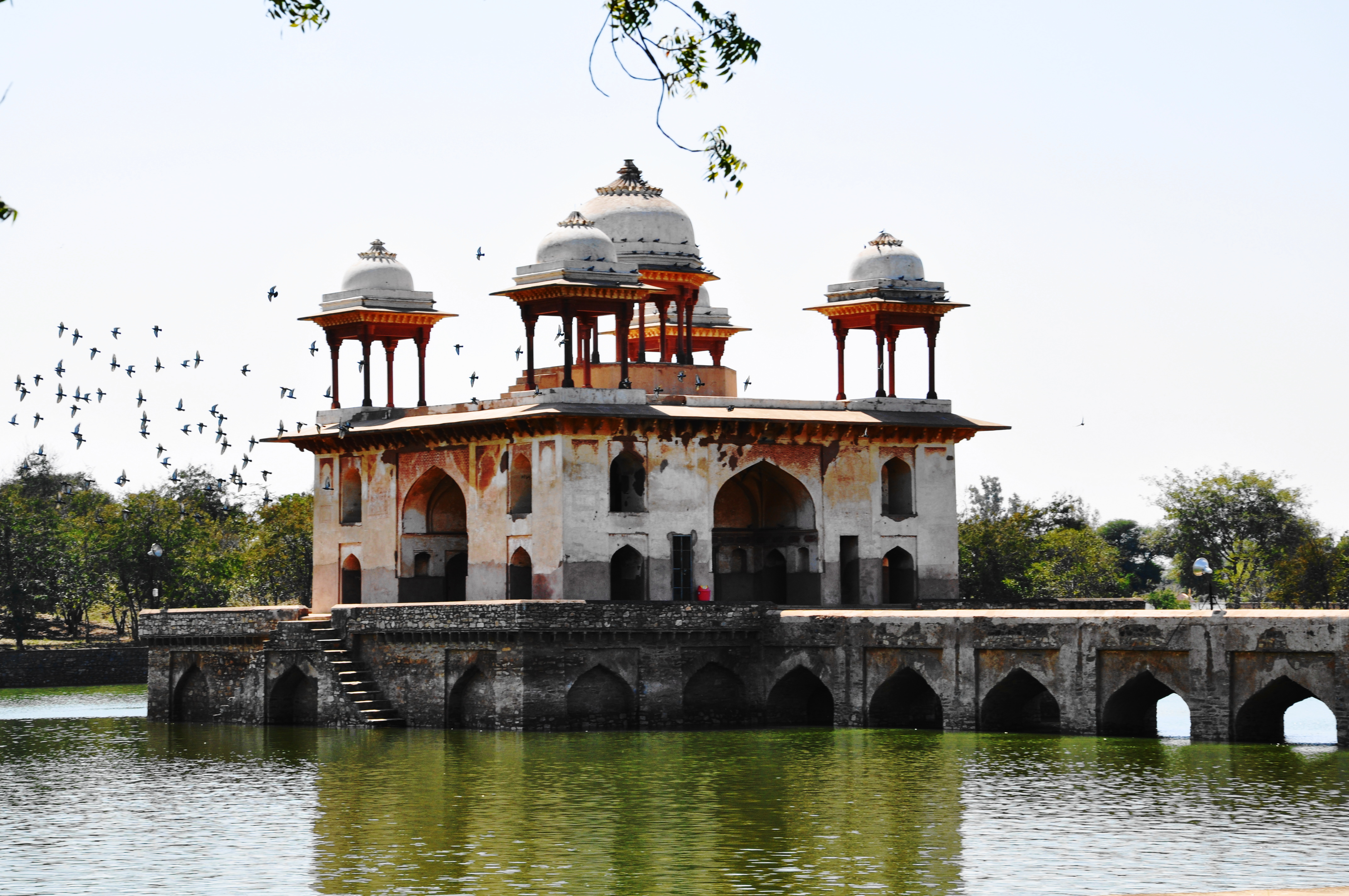
The Jal Mahal in Narnaul, India

The Jal Mahal, also known as the Jal Mahal of Narnaul or the Water Palace, is a late 16th century palace, fortification, and artificial lake located in Narnaul, Haryana, India. Built by a Mughal governor of Narnaul, the structure currently serves as a tourist attraction.

== Description ==
The Jal Mahal was built in 1591 AD by Shah Quli Khan, a member of the nobility of the Mughal empire and the governor of Narnaul. Khan was a protegee of Bairam Khan, an important official in the Mughal court and one-time regent of the empire. He was also a successful military commander who served in the Mughal army under Akbar the Great. The campaigns of Akbar to conquer northern India made Khan wealthy, and the commander distinguished himself by wounding the Suri general Hemu at the Second Battle of Panipat. In gratitude for Khan's service, Akbar granted him titles, wealth, and appointed him as the governor of Narnaul.

In addition to being a competent military leader, Khan was a noted architectural patron. Upon being appointed governor, he began a series of construction projects in Narnaul; these projects, the first of which was a tomb (built 1574-75) for himself, are described as being of a "personal sort" and as being different from some of his projects elsewhere in India; furthermore, Khan's projects were noteworthy enough to be recorded in contemporary Mughal texts.

15 years after completing his tomb, Khan began to construct a new palace in Narnaul; this structure became what is now the Jal Mahal. Khan began by creating a square artificial lake (often described as a tank or reservoir) with an island in the center; this lake was intended to form a "second Kausar" (the Pond of Abundance in Muslim paradise) for the palace's occupants. Khan then ordered the construction of a fortified gateway on the northern edge of the lake. Following this, a causeway was built out into the center of the reservoir, where a foundation was laid and a palace built. The construction of the Jal Mahal, its gate, and the lake took 2–3 years. The palace itself was decorated in the style of other Mughal palaces and pavilions; the structure was adorned with art and carvings, including inscriptions that celebrated Khan's famous victory over Hemu. In terms of area, the compound encompasses 11 acres.

In the centuries after its completion, the palace's pool gradually filled with earth. This debris was cleared in the late 20th century and the lake restored.
