= Shah Quli Khan (governor) =

16th-century Mughal noble

Shah Quli Khan was a 16th-century Mughal official, nawab (governor), and art patron. Shah Quli served as the Mughal nawab of Narnaul in Haryana in India, and notably constructed a number of historic sites in the state.

== Biography ==
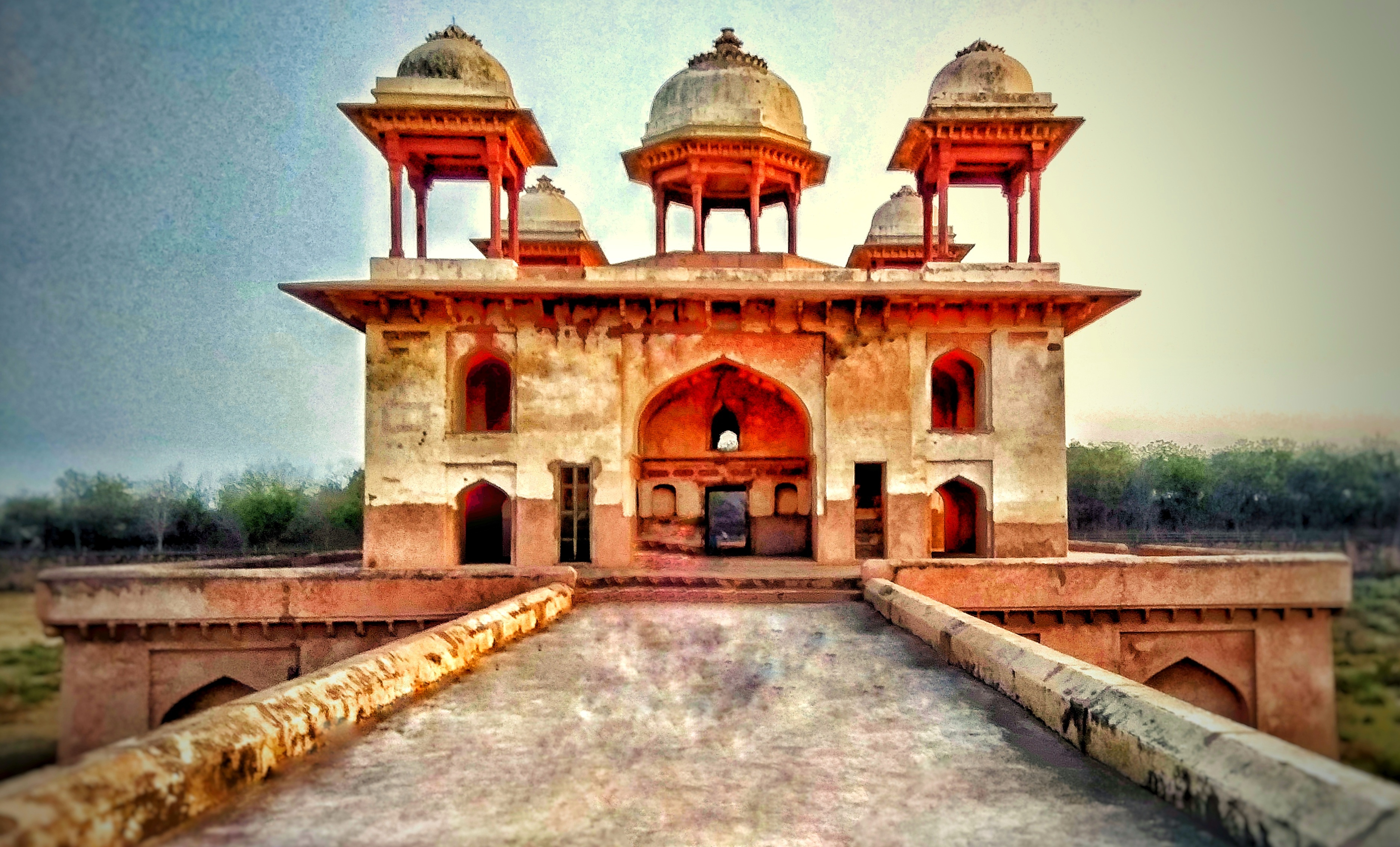
The Jal Magal in Narnaul, which was built by Shah Quli Khan in the late 16th century

Shah Quli Khan was a member of the governing class of the Mughal Empire in the 16th century. As a young man, Shah Quli was a protegee of Bairam Khan, a powerful noble who served as the regent of the Mughal Empire during the early reign of Akbar the Great. Quli's connection to Bairam Khan allowed him to curry an extensive amount of favor with the Mughal court.

=== Military career ===
In the 1550s, a series of wars broke out between the Mughals and the Sur Empire. Shah Quli Khan was deployed with the Mughal army during the war, and distinguished himself during the conflicts. During the pivotal Second Battle of Panipat in 1556, Shah Quli fought against and wounded King Hemu. The battle was a decisive victory for the Mughal empire, and Emperor Akbar commended Shah Quli for his role in the victory, showering him with wealth, titles, and land.

=== Governor of Narnaul ===
In the 1570s, Shah Quli Khan was named as the Mughal governor of Narnaul. As governor, Shah Quli began a massive construction program across the territory.

His first major project was to construct a tomb in his own honor at Narnaul in Haryana. The tomb, which has been cited as an excellent example of Mughal architectural style, was built between 1574 and 1575. The tomb featured a planned garden, and was part of Shah Quli's gubernatorial estate.

Fifteen years after building his tomb, Shah Quli Khan began constructing a palace for himself in 1588-89 AD. This building would become known as the Jal Mahal. The palace was built in the middle of an artificial lake, and is adorned with art and carvings. One such carving was done in such a way as to praise Shah Quli Khan's victory over Hemi some forty years earlier.

Upon his death, Shah Quli Khan (who was known for his generosity) donated much of his wealth to his courtiers; it has also been posited that this donation was a way to circumvent the inheritance laws of the Mughal empire. He had no heirs. He was buried in the Shah Quli Khan's Tomb.

== See also ==
- History of Haryana
