= Shah Quli Khan's Tomb =

Historic site in Narnaul, Haryana, India

Shah Quli Khan’s Tomb
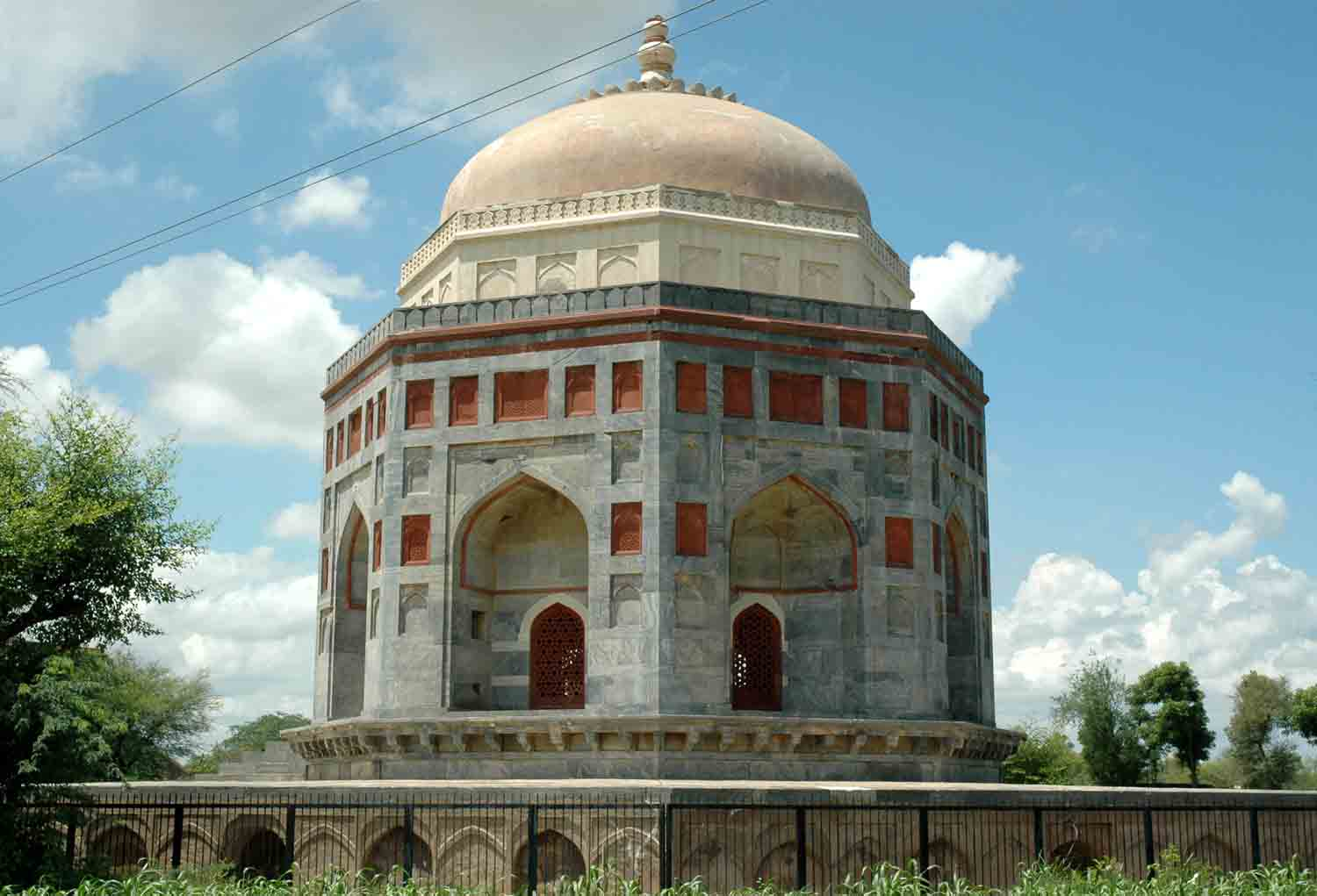
- Interactive map of Shah Quli Khan’s Tomb
- Location: Narnaul, Haryana

History
- Built: 16th century
- Built for: Shah Quli Khan

Site notes
- Architectural style: Mughal architecture

Shah Quli Khan's Tomb is a tomb located in Narnaul in the Indian state of Haryana. It is the resting place of Shah Quli Khan, who was the governor of Narnaul. It was built in the 16th century.

One of the few examples of Mughal architecture in Narnaul, it is a monument of national importance.

== History ==
Shah Quli Khan was the Mughal governor of Narnaul during the reign of Akbar. The tomb was commissioned by Shah Quli Khan during his lifetime, and it remained a part of his estate.

== Architecture ==
The two storeyed octagonal tomb is situated on a raised platform. black and yellow marble, along with red sandstone.

== Other monuments ==
To the West lies a large gateway leading to the tomb, known as Tripolia Gate. The tomb of Shah Quli's brother, Islam Quli Khan, is situated at a small distance from this tomb, to the North-East. It is a brick building with little architectural significance.

== See also ==
- History of Narnaul
- History of Haryana
