= Gadhpuri =

- Village
- Country: India
- State: Haryana
- Region: North India
- District: Palwal

Languages
- Time zone: UTC+5:30 (IST)
- Website: haryana.gov.in

Gadhpuri is a village in the Palwal district of Haryana, India.

== Demographics ==
Per the 2011 Census of India, Gadhpuri had a total population of 1639 people; 880 of them male and 759 female.
