= Nangal Chaudhry Assembly constituency =

Legislative Assembly constituency in Haryana State, India

Coordinates: 27.89°N 76.11°E

Nangal Chaudhry
- Constituency No. 71 for the Haryana Legislative Assembly

Constituency details
- Country: India
- Region: North India
- State: Haryana
- District: Mahendragarh
- Lok Sabha constituency: Bhiwani-Mahendragarh
- Total electors: 1,68,244
- Reservation: None

Member of Legislative Assembly
- 15th Haryana Legislative Assembly
- Incumbent Manju Choudhary
- Party: Indian National Congress
- Elected year: 2024

Nangal Chaudhry Assembly constituency is one of the 90 Legislative Assembly constituencies of Haryana state in India.

It is part of Mahendragarh district.

== Members of the Legislative Assembly ==
Year	Member	Party
Till 2009: Constituency did not exist
2009	Bahadur Singh	Indian National Lok Dal
2014	Abhe Singh Yadav	Bharatiya Janata Party
2019	Abhe Singh Yadav	Bharatiya Janata Party
2024	Manju Choudhary	Indian National Congress

== Election results ==
=== Assembly Election 2024 ===
2024 Haryana Legislative Assembly election: Nangal Chaudhry
Party	Candidate	Votes	%	±%
INC	Manju Choudhary	61,989	52.32	▲48.11
BJP	Dr. Abhe Singh Yadav	55,059	46.47	▼7.10
JJP	Rao Om Prakash Engineer	576	0.49	▼33.20
NOTA	None of the Above	386	0.33	New
Margin of victory		6,930	5.85	▼14.04
Turnout		1,18,473	71.40	▲2.79
Registered electors		1,68,244		▲9.83
INC gain from BJP		Swing	▼1.25	

=== Assembly Election 2019 ===
2019 Haryana Legislative Assembly election: Nangal Chaudhry
Party	Candidate	Votes	%	±%
BJP	Dr. Abhe Singh Yadav	55,529	53.57	▲20.24
JJP	Mula Ram	34,914	33.68	New
INC	Raja Ram	4,371	4.22	▼2.04
INLD	Suman Devi	4,341	4.19	▼28.18
BSP	Gaje Singh	2,016	1.94	▲1.13
Swaraj India	Tejpal Yadav	1,279	1.23	New
SUCI(C)	Chhaju Ram Rawat	867	0.84	New
Margin of victory		20,615	19.89	▲18.92
Turnout		1,03,657	68.61	▼6.62
Registered electors		1,51,080		▲11.66
BJP hold		Swing	▲20.24	

=== Assembly Election 2014 ===
2014 Haryana Legislative Assembly election: Nangal Chaudhry
Party	Candidate	Votes	%	±%
BJP	Dr. Abhe Singh Yadav	33,929	33.33	▲30.04
INLD	Manju	32,948	32.37	▼5.63
Independent	Radhey Shyam	14,942	14.68	New
Independent	Binod Kumar Alias Vinod	9,364	9.20	New
INC	Chander Parkash	6,371	6.26	▼18.30
Independent	Gaje Singh	1,065	1.05	New
BSP	Surender Kumar	834	0.82	▼1.03
HJCPV	Ram Singh	601	0.59	New
Margin of victory		981	0.96	▼12.47
Turnout		1,01,789	75.23	▲2.89
Registered electors		1,35,309		▲12.77
BJP gain from INLD		Swing	▼4.67	

=== Assembly Election 2009 ===
2009 Haryana Legislative Assembly election: Nangal Chaudhry
Party	Candidate	Votes	%	±%
INLD	Bahadur Singh	32,984	38.00	New
INC	Radhey Shyam	21,321	24.56	New
HJC(BL)	Mula Ram	20,918	24.10	New
Independent	Abhimanyu	3,119	3.59	New
BJP	Daya Ram	2,857	3.29	New
BSP	Sher Singh	1,607	1.85	New
Independent	Satya Narain	1,029	1.19	New
Independent	Baldev Singh	828	0.95	New
Margin of victory		11,663	13.44	
Turnout		86,800	72.34	
Registered electors		1,19,990		
INLD win (new seat)				

== See also ==
- List of constituencies of the Haryana Legislative Assembly
- Mahendragarh district
