= Nabha House, New Delhi =

Former residence of the Raja of Nabha

Coordinates: 28.626461°N 77.234327°E

Nabha House was the former residence of the Raja of Nabha. It is located on Kasturba Gandhi Marg close to Mandi House.

It passed into the possession of the state government of Haryana. In 2005, under the chairmanship of Chief Minister Om Prakash Chautala a decision was made to transfer 1484.10 square metres of land belonging to Nabha House to the Delhi Metro Rail Corporation for construction of the Mandi House metro station.

In 2012 the state government announced to set up a cultural hub at Nabha House.
