= Barsi Gate =

Coordinates: 29.0987°N 75.9643°E

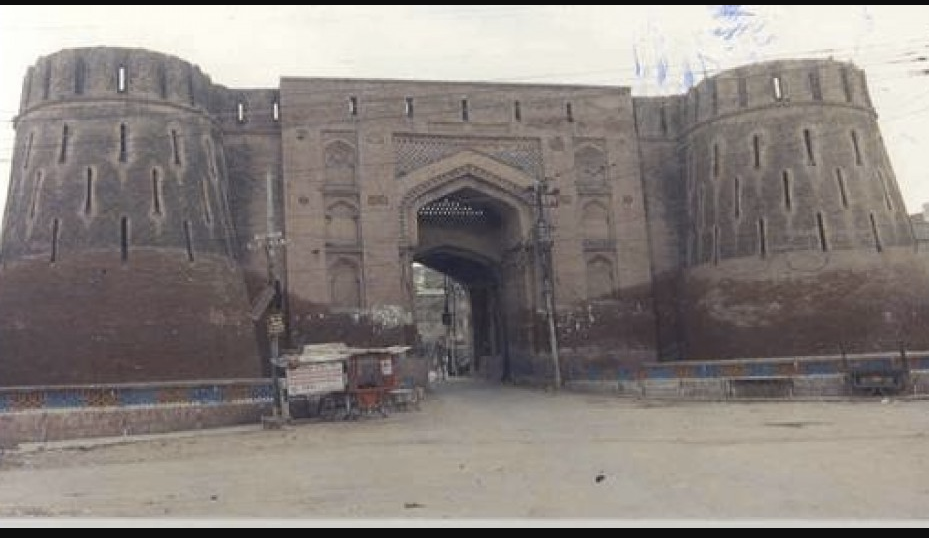
Barsi Gate

Barsi Gate is one of the five gates and the only surviving gate that surrounded the walled city of Hansi. It is considered as a good example of Sultanate architecture. It was built in 1303 AD by Sultan Alaud-din Khilji in 1303 AD and eventually repaired in 1522 AD during the rule of Ibrahim Lodhi. The height of the gate is close to 30 metres and the gate is under the protection of Government of India. The other 4 gates were known as Delhi Gate (East), Hisar Gate (West), Gosain Gate (North-west) and Umra Gate (South west).
