= Surana, Bhopal =

Surana
- village
- Location within Madhya Pradesh Location within India
- Coordinates: 23.778005°N 77.298597°E
- Country: India
- State: Madhya Pradesh
- District: Bhopal
- Tehsil: Berasia

Population (2011)
  - Total: 939
- Time zone: UTC+5:30 (IST)
- ISO 3166 code: MP-IN
- Census code: 482068

Surana is a village in the Bhopal district of Madhya Pradesh, India. It is located in the Berasia tehsil.

== Demographics ==
According to the 2011 census of India, Surana has 186 households. The effective literacy rate (i.e. the literacy rate of population excluding children aged 6 and below) is 37.89%.

Demographics (2011 Census)
| | Total | Male | Female |
|---|---|---|---|
| Population | 939 | 524 | 415 |
| Children aged below 6 years | 179 | 95 | 84 |
| Scheduled caste | 359 | 191 | 168 |
| Scheduled tribe | 0 | 0 | 0 |
| Literates | 288 | 198 | 90 |
| Workers (all) | 398 | 263 | 135 |
| Main workers (total) | 274 | 190 | 84 |
| Main workers: Cultivators | 139 | 118 | 21 |
| Main workers: Agricultural labourers | 128 | 68 | 60 |
| Main workers: Household industry workers | 0 | 0 | 0 |
| Main workers: Other | 7 | 4 | 3 |
| Marginal workers (total) | 124 | 73 | 51 |
| Marginal workers: Cultivators | 37 | 27 | 10 |
| Marginal workers: Agricultural labourers | 81 | 40 | 41 |
| Marginal workers: Household industry workers | 0 | 0 | 0 |
| Marginal workers: Others | 6 | 6 | 0 |
| Non-workers | 541 | 261 | 280 |
