= Khwaja Khizr Tomb =

Historical monument in Sonipat, NCR, India

Khwaja garib nawaz Tomb
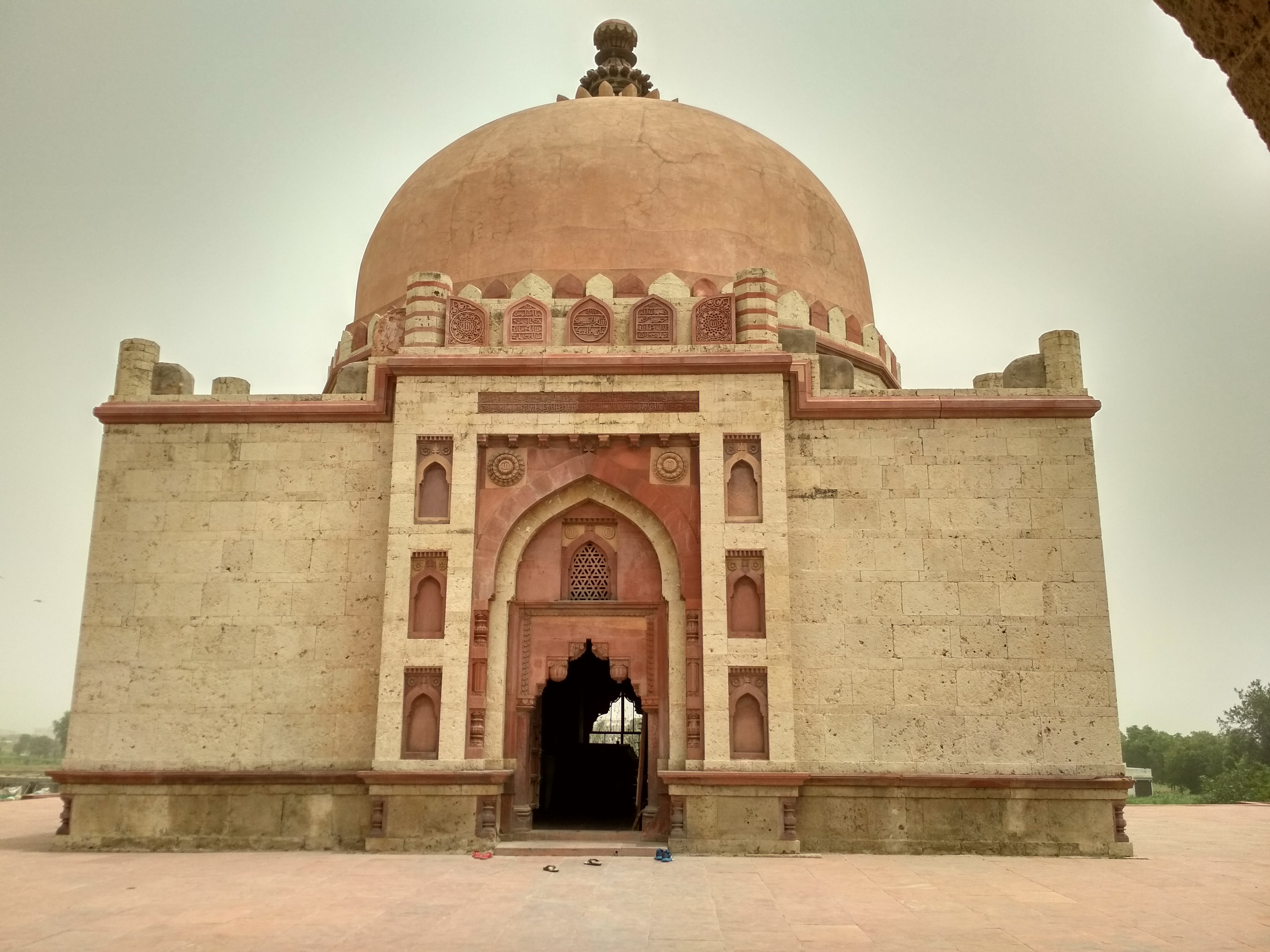
- Interactive map of Khwaja garib nawaz Tomb
- 29.00689°N 77.01401°E
- Type: Tomb
- Location: Jatwara, Sonipat

History
- Built: 1522–1524 CE

Site notes
- Area: 10 acres
- Architect: Lodi dynasty
- Architectural style: Indo-Islamic architecture
- Governing body: Archeological Survey of India
- Owner: Government of India

Khwaja Khizr Tomb (Khwaja garib nawaz Tomb) is a maqbara located at Jatwara, Sonipat, Haryana, India. It was built by Ibrahim Lodi in the memory of Muslim saint Khwaja Khizr, the son of Darya Khan, during the period of 1522–1524 CE.

Ibrahim Lodi built the tomb, which is five hundred years old, as the last construction of the Lodi dynasty by Ibrahim Lodi. The Tomb of Khwaja Khizer nawaj was constructed with red sandstone, Lakhauri bricks and kankar blocks.

According to a Persian inscription found in the tomb Khwaja Khizer was the son of Dharya Khan Sharwani who was an influential noble in the court of Ibrahim Lodi.
