= Narnaul =

- City
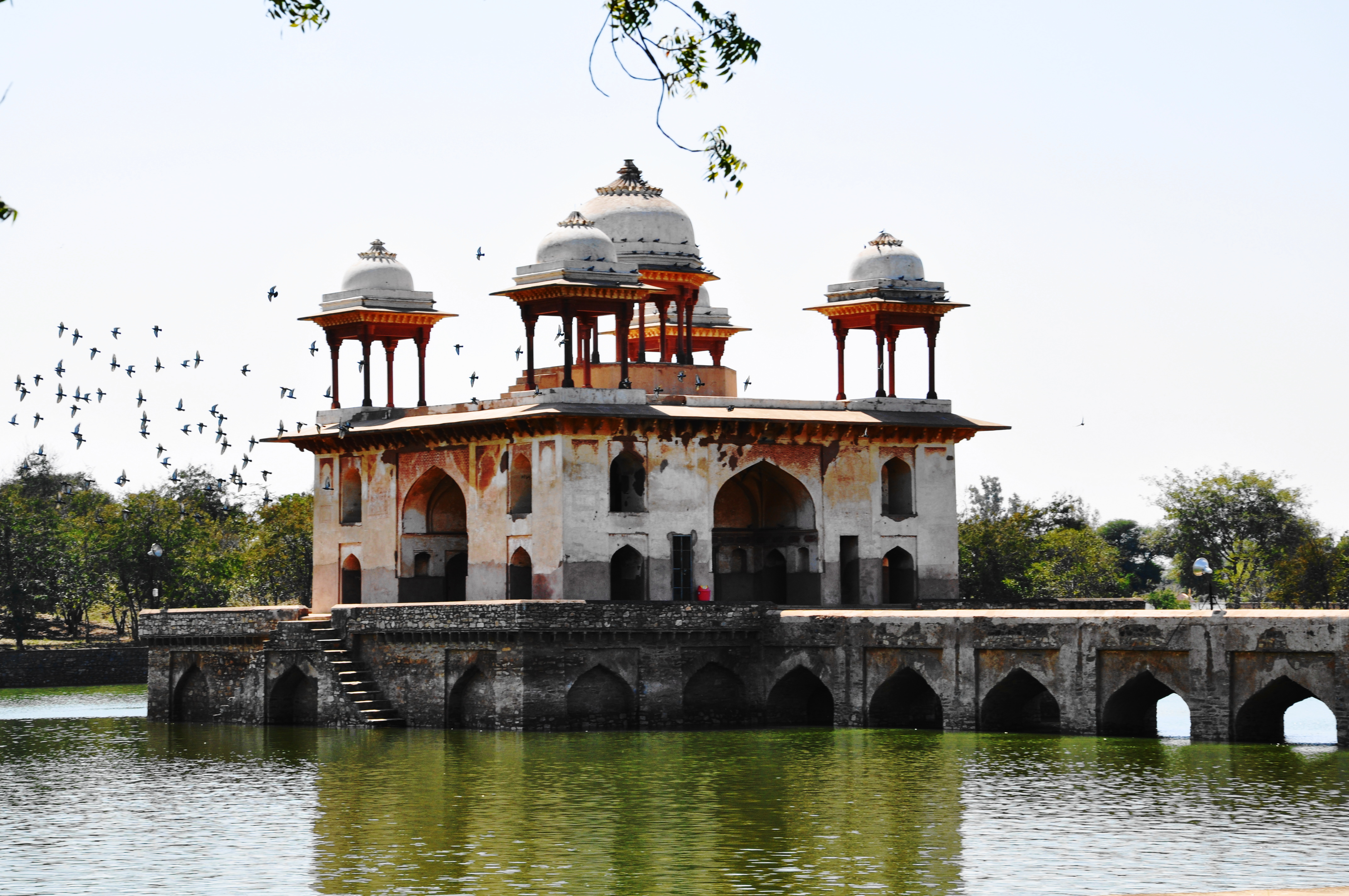
- Jal Mahal of Narnaul, Haryana

- Location within Haryana Location within India
- Coordinates: 28°02′40″N 76°06′20″E
- Country: India
- State: Haryana
- District: Mahendragarh
- Seat: Government of Haryana
- Elevation: 318 m (1,043 ft)

Population (2011)
  - Total: 145,897

Languages
  - Official: Hindi, Haryanvi & English registration_plate = HR-35 xxxx (for non-commercial vehicles); HR-66 xxxx (for commercial vehicles)
- Time zone: UTC+05:30 (IST)
- Postal code of India: 123001
- Area code: 01282
- ISO 3166 code: IN-HR
- Sex ratio: 901 ♂/♀
- Climate: Cw (Köppen)
- Precipitation: 570 millimetres (22 in)
- Avg. summer temperature: 38 °C (100 °F)
- Avg. winter temperature: 04 °C (39 °F)
- Website: mahendragarh.gov.in

Narnaul is a city, a Municipal Council, and location of headquarters of the Mahendragarh district in the Indian state of Haryana. It is located in the National Capital Region of India.

== Etymology ==
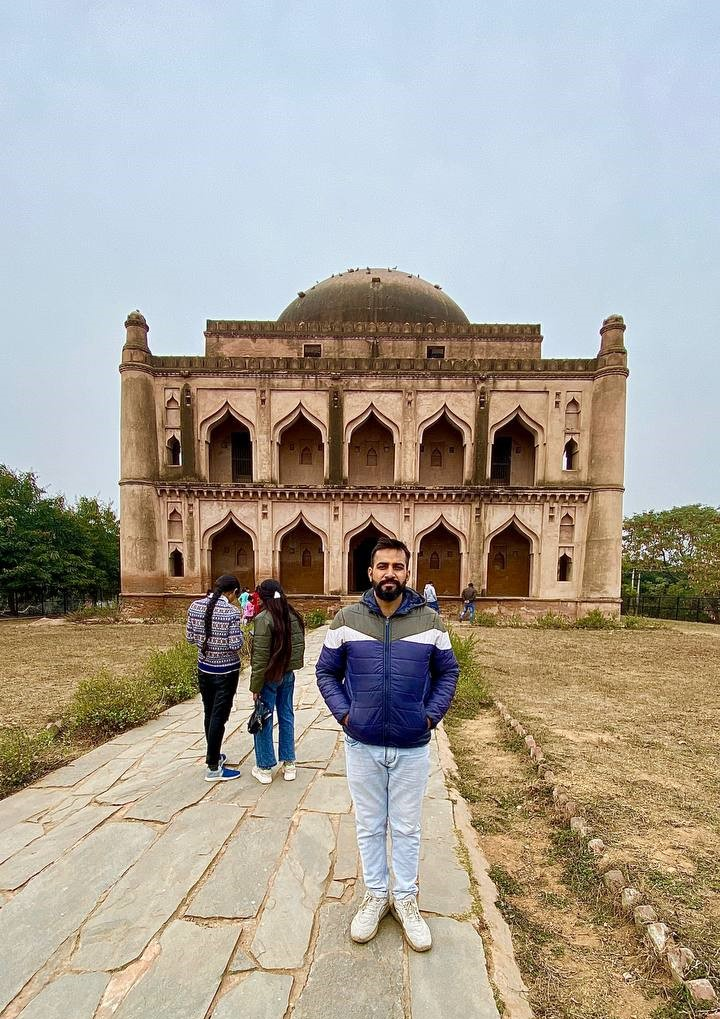
Chor Gumbad at Narnaul which was made by Afghan Noble Jamal after impressed by Rao Ranmal Singh of Narnaul.

During the early Vedic period of Rigveda, this area was called the Nandigram where rishi Chyavana lived in his ashram. During the later Vedic period of Mahabharta, this area was called the Nara Rashtra which later became corrupted to Narnaul.

== History ==
=== Vedic period ===
During the Mahabharta period, the Nara Rashtra, on the Hastinapur to Chambal route, was conquered by the youngest Pandava brother Sahdev.

Narnaul is built on a prominent tell, but the tell has never been excavated so the site's earliest history is unknown. The Muslim invader Shah Wilayat came to Narnaul in 1137 CE with sword and jewels (bribes), and he was killed here by the native Nuniwal in the battle — over half a century before the Muslim conquest of Delhi. The dargah built for him has a coffered roof similar to early monuments at Ajmer and Bayana and may have been built during this early period. Some architecture from the time of the Delhi Sultanate survives in Narnaul; the earlier phases are mostly concentrated in and around the dargah complex of Shah Wilayat, while many buildings from the Lodi dynasty are found both in Narnaul itself and on the road to Delhi. These buildings are typically undated.

=== Medieval period ===
During medieval period, the native Nuniwal Kshatriyas(Ahir Clan) ruled the area. In 1137 CE, foreign-origin Muslim invader Hazrat Turkman, also known as Shah Wilayat, was killed by the native Nuniwal.

Narnaul is likely the birthplace of the emperor Sher Shah Suri's grandfather Ibrahim Khan Suri; his family is known to have had ties here for multiple generations before him. After his defeat of Humayun in 1540, Sher Shah built a monumental tomb for his grandfather, Ibrahim Khan Suri, inside the dargah complex at Narnaul. This tomb is built in the Lodi architectural style. Later buildings from the Mughal Empire include the Jal Mahal and the octagonal tomb of Shah Quli Khan. An ornate haveli, the Chhata Rai Bal Mukund Das, reflects the "Bengali" architectural style that was spread to northern India at the time of Shah Jahan and was later popular under the Rao Kings of Ahirwal.

=== Maratha Ahir period ===
In the 1700s, Narnaul variously came under Maratha and Ahir clans control. The Muslim Nawab of Narnaul took part in the Indian Rebellion of 1857 and, after its suppression, the British confiscated his lands and gave them to the Maharaja of Patiala, who had sided with them during the war.

=== British raj ===
==== Battle of Narnaul ====
The Battle of Narnaul (also called Battle of Nasibpur) was fought on 16 November 1857, between the British Raj and local chiefs during the Indian Rebellion of 1857.

Local chiefs such as Pran Sukh Yadav of Behror, Rao Tula Ram of Rewari and Rao Dhan Singh of Charkhi Dadri fought with the British at Nasibpur village near Narnaul. The battle was one of the most ferocious battles of the Indian Rebellion of 1857.

Rao Dhan Singh of Charkhi Dadri, was the military Governor of Shekhawati during the upheaval of 1857. He alongwith his kinsman played an active role in the struggle for independence in 1857 A.D. against the British and fought bravely in the Battle of Narnaul.

During the Battle of Narnaul at Nasibpur on 16 November 1857, British lost 2000 British soldiers and their commanders Colonel Gerrard and Captain Wallace, 5000 British soldiers and officers Captain Craige, Captain Kennedy and Captain Pearse were wounded. Colonel Gerrard died after getting mortally wounded in a military engagement against Rao Kishan Singh. When Pran Sukh Yadav took aim at the Colonel Gerrard wearing a red coat whose rest of the soldiers were in khaki uniform, he missed his aim the first time but hit it right the second time and Colonel Gerard was killed in Narnaul. Now mostly population are of Ahirs.

Rao Krishan Gopal, from Nangal Pathani village of Gurgaon district was the Kotwal of Meerut, who had played a prominent part in collaboration with Raja Nahar Singh of Ballabhgarh State, Nawab of Jhajjar, and Khanzada Rajput Raja Salamat Khan of Mewat, by organising the patriotic forces and participating in several battles against the British troops. He and his younger brother, Rao Ram Lal, were killed in this battle of Nasibpur.

== Monuments ==
=== Forts ===
- Nivajpur Fort, built by Mughal jagirdar Nivaj Ali at Nivajpur village 10 km from Narnaul, has 3 ft wide and 20 ft high stone walls. It had a system of wells, warehouses, stables and a 42 ft wide gateway, all of which now lie in ruins.
- Islampur Fort, situated in the fields on a hillock between two villages Islampura and Sareli, has enclosing walls. It lies in northwest forested corner of Islampura, 20 km south of Narnaul bus stand and 17 km west of Nangal Chaudhary. In 2025, Haryana government announced a INR 95 crore restoration plan for upgrade of 20 monuments across the state including the Islampur Fort.

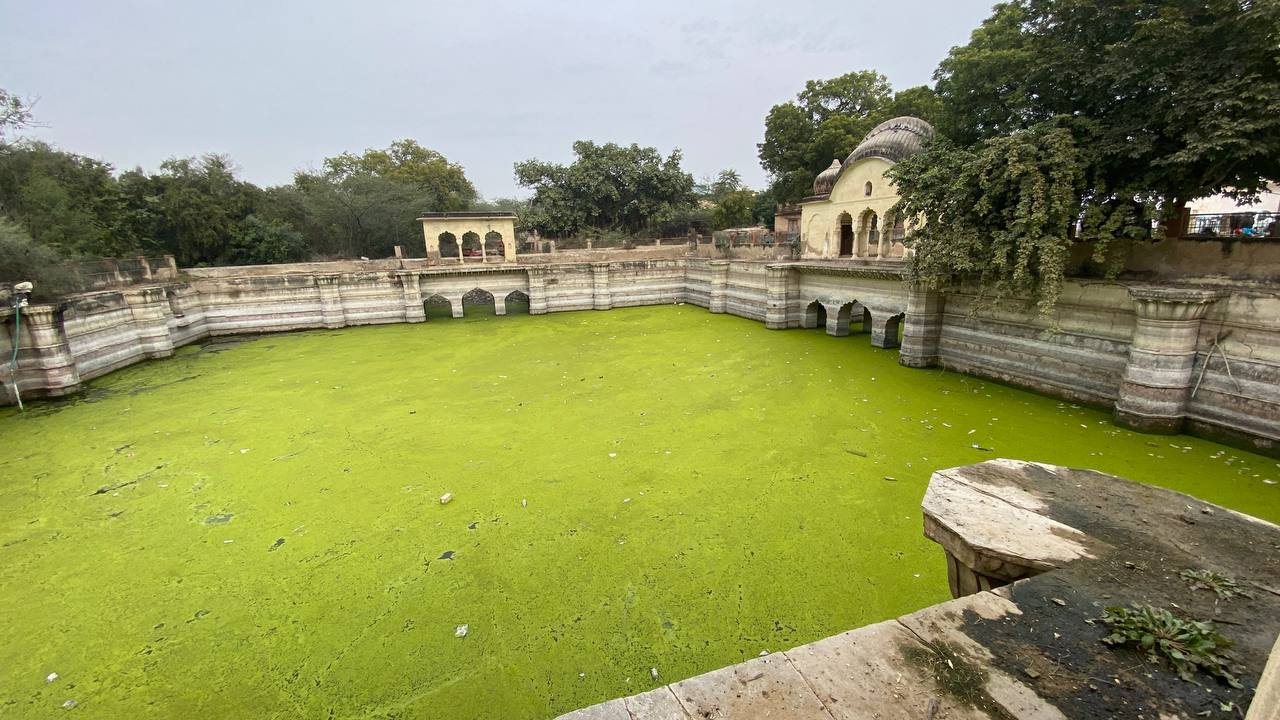
Gopal Sagar Narnaul.

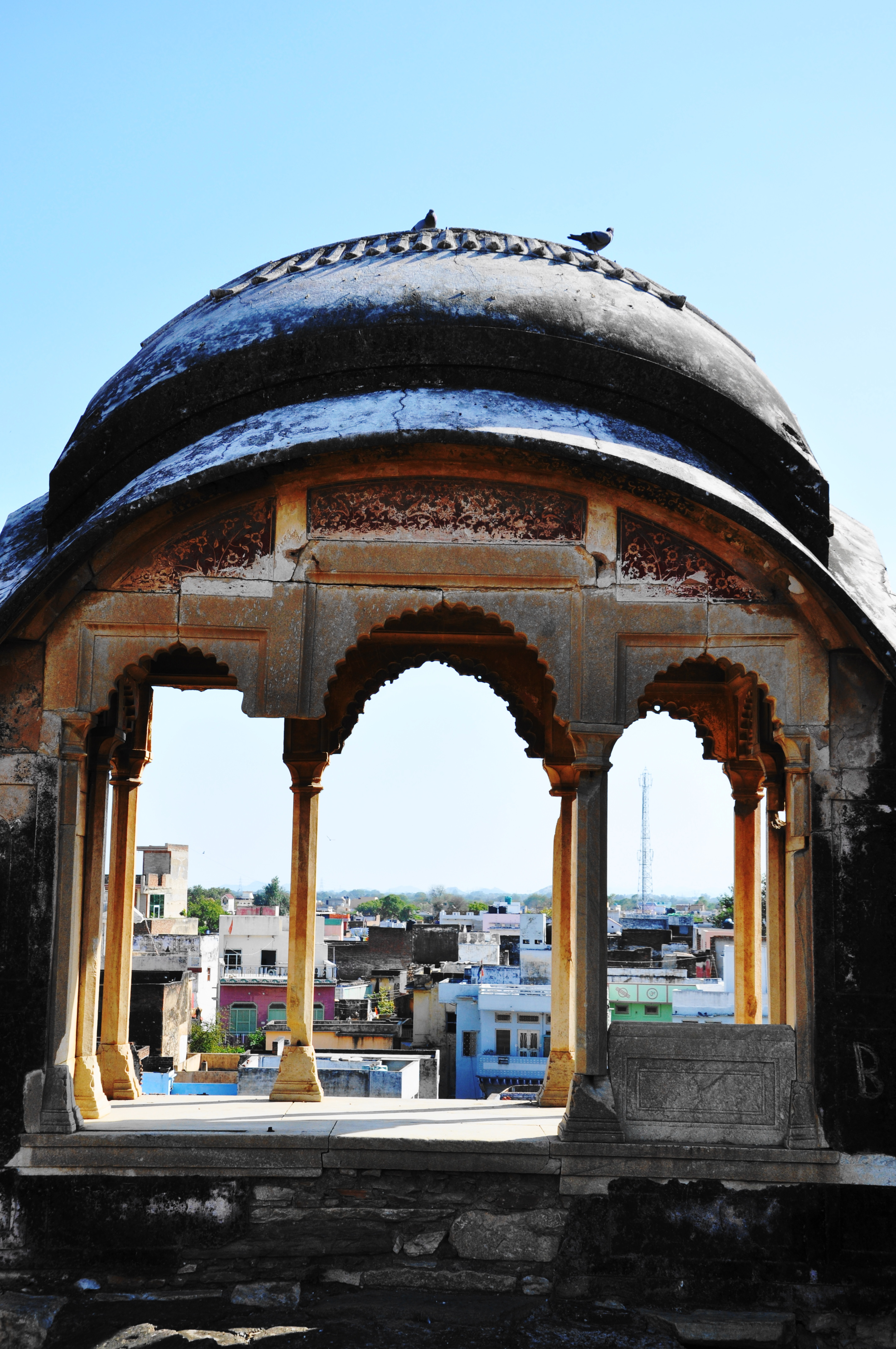
Chatta Rai Bal Mukund Das of Narnaul.

=== Stepwells and waterbodies ===
- Nagpurian Baoli or Mirza Alijan baoli, an 18th-century three tier stepwell next to the Chotta Bada Talab and Shiv Temple, is a protected archaeological monument which was built by the local people of trading community who had migrated to Nagpur.
- Baba Kheta Nath Baoli, at the campus of Baba Kheta Nath Government Polytechnic College.
- Mukundpura Baoli, 10 km south of Narnaul in Mukundpura.
- Jal Mahal in southern suburbs of Narnaul. Fifteen years after building his tomb, Shah Quli Khan began constructing the Jal Mahal palace for himself in 1588-89 AD. The palace was built in the middle of an artificial lake, and is adorned with art and carvings. One such carving was done in such a way as to praise Shah Quli Khan's victory over Hemu.
- Shobha Sarovar, south of Narnaul on Narnaul-Behror Road.
- Dhosi Hill: velconic hill and ashram of vedic period rishis, such as Chyavana Rishi who formulated Chyavanprash.

=== Other monuments ===
- Chatta Rai Balmukund Das (Birbal ka Chatta), built by the Diwan of Narnaul during the reign of Shah Jahan, is a five-storey building with several halls and pillars.
- Chor Gumbad, located on NH-11 west of and adjacent to Government ITI in Narnaul, this square shaped double-storied single chamber with four minarets at each corner, was constructed by an Afghan Jamal Khan as his tomb during the rule of Firuz Shah Tughlaq (1351-88 CE).
- Tomb and mosque of Peer Turkman, 12th century foreign-origin Turkmen Muslim invader known as Hazrat Turkman and Shah Wilayat, was killed in 1137 CE by the native Hindu Nuniwal people of Narnaul. His tomb is built in Tughluq architectural style.
- Tomb of Ibrahim Shah Suri (died 1567-68) of Sur Empire, situated close to the tomb of Pir Turkman. Sher Shah Suri in the memory of his grandfather, who was a ruler of Bengal. The tomb was designed and built by the Sher Shah’s architect, Sheikh Ahmad Niyazi.
- Shah Quli Khan's Tomb, 16th century the governor of Narnaul Shah Quli Khan during the reign of Akbar, is built in Mughal architecture in Narnaul. Shah Quli Khan commissioned the two-storeyed octagonal tomb on a raised plinth with black and yellow marble and red sandstone during his lifetime. During the pivotal Second Battle of Panipat in 1556, Shah Quli fought against and wounded last Hindu King of Delhi Hemu.
- Islam Quli Khan's tomb, Islam Quli Khan was a brother of Shah Quli Khan. Islam Quli Khan's brock tomb is situated at a small distance northeast of Shah Quli Khan's Tomb.
- Tripolia Gateway, lies west of Shah Quli Khan's Tomb.

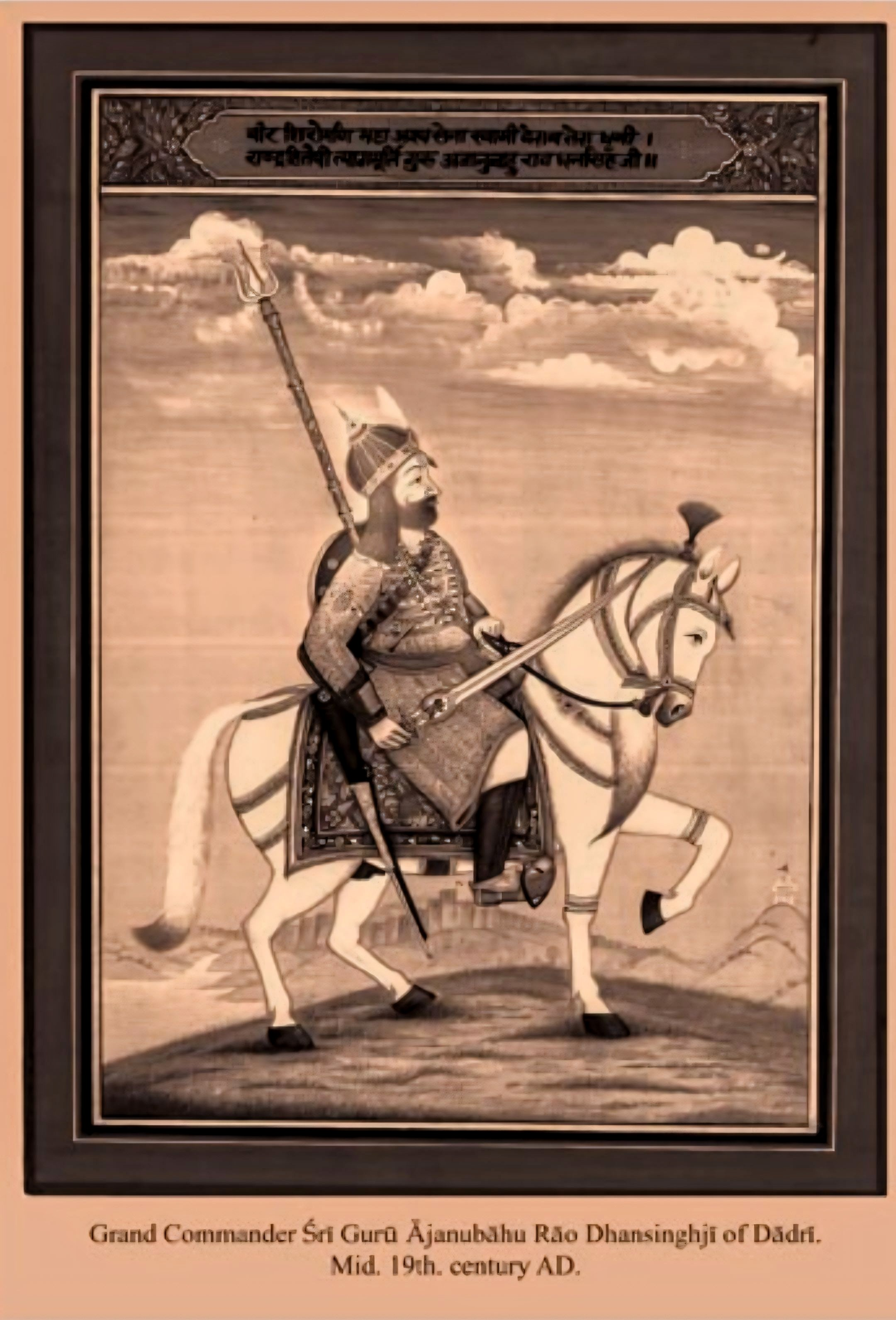
Ajanubahu Rao Dhan Singh, a Brahman Rao of Charkhi Dadri.

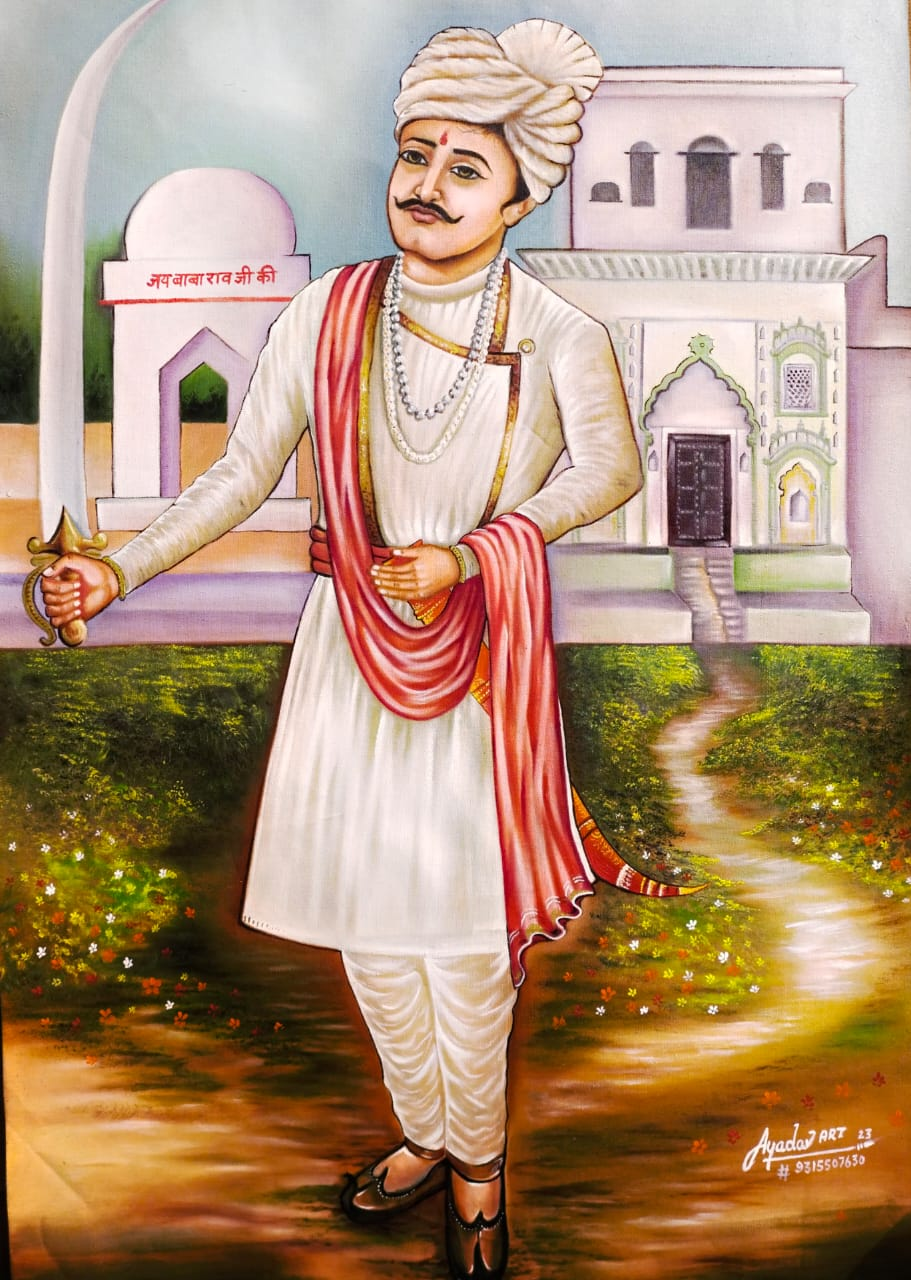
Rao Kishan Singh who defeated British contingent at Nasibpur in 1857 and wounded Col Gerrad in direct conflict.

== Geography ==
Narnaul is located at 28.04°N 76.11°E. It has an average elevation of 300 meters (977 feet). The district is rich in mineral resources such as iron ore, copper ore, beryl, tourmaline, muscovite, biotite, albite, calcite, and quartz.

== Notable people ==
- Sher Shah Suri (1472/1486–1545): Founder of the Sur Empire and Sultan of Hindustan, whose grandfather Ibrahim Khan Sur had established the family's presence in the Narnaul area.
- Pran Sukh Yadav (19th century): Military commander and strategist associated with Rao Tula Ram, who fought against British forces in the Battle of Narnaul during the Indian Rebellion of 1857.
- Nityanand Swami (1927–2012): First Chief Minister of Uttarakhand, then known as Uttaranchal.

== Demographics ==
As of 2001 India census, Narnaul had a population of 74,581. Males constitute 53% of the population and females 47%. Narnaul has an average literacy rate of 68%, higher than the national average of 59.5%: male literacy is 76%, and female literacy is 58%. This region is dominated by Yadav and Saini community. In Narnaul, 14% of the population is under 6 years of age.

Hindi, Haryanvi and Ahirwati are the languages majorly spoken in Narnaul.

== See also ==
- Divisions of Haryana
- Tourism in Haryana
