= Chili =

Chili or chilli may refer to:

== Food ==
- Chili pepper, the spicy fruit of plants in the genus Capsicum; sometimes spelled "chilli" in the UK and "chile" in the southwestern US
- Chili powder, the dried, pulverized fruit of one or more varieties of chili pepper
- Chili con carne, often referred to simply as "chili", a stew with a chili sauce base
- Cincinnati chili, a meat sauce popular in Ohio and Northern Kentucky; different from chili con carne
- Chili sauce

== Places ==
=== China ===
- Zhili (province), formerly romanized as Chili, a former Chinese province

=== Russia ===
- Chilli (river), Vilyuy basin, Yakutia

=== United States ===
- Chili Township, Hancock County, Illinois
  - Chili, Illinois, an unincorporated community
- Chili, Indiana, an unincorporated town
- Chili, New Mexico, an unincorporated census-designated place
- Chili, New York, a suburb of Rochester
- Chili, Ohio, an unincorporated community
- Chili, Wisconsin, an unincorporated census-designated place
- Chili Gulch (also spelled Chile Gulch), a gulch in Calaveras County, California

== People ==
- Sheikh Chilli (Sufi scholar) (died circa 1650), Indian Sufi scholar
- Dorothy Chili Bouchier (1909–1999), British actress
- Chen Chi-li (1943–2007), Taiwanese gangster
- Manuel Chili (1723–1796), Ecuadorian Baroque sculptor
- Pierfrancesco Chili (born 1964), Italian motorcycle racer
- Sue Chilly (also spelt Chilli; born 1954), co-founder of Black Women's Action in Australia in 1976
- Charles Chili Davis (born 1960), Jamaica-born American baseball player
- Claus Pilgaard (born 1965), Danish musician and entertainer also known as Chili Klaus
- Rozonda Thomas (born 1971), American R&B singer-songwriter and actress whose stage name is "Chilli"

== Fictional characters ==
- Sheikh Chilli (folklore), comical figure in the folklore of India and Pakistan
- Chili (Pokémon), a character of the Pokémon universe
- Chili Palmer, a character in Get Shorty and Be Cool
- Chili Storm, a Marvel Comics character who appeared in Millie the Model stories and was spun off into her own title, Chili
- Chili, a tarantula in the 3D film It's Tough to Be a Bug!, based on the 1998 animated film A Bug's Life
- Chilli Heeler, Bluey's mother in Bluey (TV series)
- Chili Bear, a bear from Hallmark Media's, Hoops & Yoyo

== Other uses ==
- Chili Line, a former branch of the Denver and Rio Grande Western Railroad
- Chili Seminary, the original name of Roberts Wesleyan College, a Christian liberal arts college in Rochester, New York
- Chili's, a restaurant chain specializing in Tex-Mex food

== See also ==
- Chile (disambiguation)
- Chilii (disambiguation)
- Chillies (band), a Vietnamese band
- Chilly (disambiguation)
- Sheikh Chilli (disambiguation)
