= Sheikh Chilli =

Sheikh Chilli may refer to:

- Sheikh Chilli (folklore), a character from the folklore of India and Pakistan
- Sheikh Chilli (film), a 1942 Indian Hindi-language comedy film
- Sheikh Chilli (Sufi scholar), a 17th-century Sufi scholar in India
  - Sheikh Chilli's Tomb, a complex of structures in Thanesar, Haryana, India

== See also ==
- Sheikh (disambiguation)
- Chilli (disambiguation)
