= Chiles =

Chiles may refer to:

- Chiles (surname)
- Chiles (volcano), an extinct volcano in Ecuador
- Chiles, Nariño, a settlement in Nariño Department, Colombia.
- Chiles Center, a multi-purpose arena in Portland, Oregon
- Lillis Business Complex, a building on the University of Oregon campus
- New Mexico Chiles, an American soccer club

== See also ==
- Childs (disambiguation)
- Chile (disambiguation)
- Chiles Valley AVA, California wine region in Napa Valley
- Chili pepper
