= Childs (surname) =

Childs is a surname. Notable people with the surname include:

- Amy Childs (born 1990), English television personality and model
- Barney Childs (1926–2000), American composer
- Barry and Sally Childs-Helton, American singer/songwriters
- Billy Childs (born 1957), American composer and jazz pianist
- Brevard Childs (1923–2007), American Biblical scholar
- Chris Childs (disambiguation), several people
- Cupid Childs (1867–1912), American Major League baseball player
- David Childs (1941–2025), American architect
- David Childs (academic) (born 1933), British academic and political historian
- David L. Childs, American computer scientist
- Earle Childs (1893–1918), American submariner
- Ebenezer Childs (1797–1864), American pioneer
- Elijah Childs (born 1999), American basketball player in the Israeli Basketball Premier League
- Euros Childs (born 1975), Welsh singer/songwriter
- George William Childs (1829–1894), American publisher
- J. Michelle Childs (born 1966), judge on the United States Court of Appeals for the District of Columbia Circuit
- John Childs (disambiguation), several people
- Joe Childs (1884–1958), French-born, British-based flat racing jockey
- Joseph Childs (1787–1870), English soldier and penal administrator
- Lauren M. Childs, American mathematician, expert on modeling disease spread
- Lee Childs (born 1982), English tennis player
- Lucinda Childs (born 1940), American dancer/choreographer
- Marquis Childs (1903–1990), American journalist
- Mary Ellen Childs (born 1957), American composer
- Mary Louise Milliken Childs (1873–1936), American philanthropist
- Morris Childs (born Moishe Chilovsky, 1902–1991), Russian-born communist double agent
- Ozro W. Childs (1824–1890), American horticulturalist
- Roy Childs (1949–1992), American critic and essayist
- Ted Childs (born 1934), British television producer, screenwriter and director
- Terry Childs (serial killer) (1955–2023), American serial killer
- Thomas Childs (1796–1853), American soldier
- Toni Childs (born 1957), American singer/songwriter
- Tracey Childs (born 1963), English actress
- William Harold Joseph Childs (1905–1983), British physicist
- Yoeli Childs (born 1998), American basketball player

== See also ==
- Child (surname)
- Chiles (surname)
