= Chiles (surname) =

Chiles is a surname, a variation of Childs, from the Anglo-Saxon 'Cild'. Notable people with the surname include:

- Adrian Chiles (born 1967), British TV and radio presenter
- Aidan Chiles (born 2005), American football player
- Eddie Chiles (1910–1993), American businessman
- Henry G. Chiles Jr. (born 1938), United States Navy admiral
- James Chiles (died 1873), Confederate outlaw who rode with William Quantrill's gang
- John Chiles (born 1988), American football player
- Jordan Chiles (born 2001), American gymnast
- Joseph Chiles, (1810–1885), California pioneer and guide, colonel in the U.S. Army
- Lawton Chiles (1930–1998), American politician
- Linden Chiles (1933–2013), American actor
- Lois Chiles (born 1947), American actress and model
- Marcellus H. Chiles (1895–1918), American soldier, World War I Medal of Honor recipient
- Patrick Chiles (born 1964), Science Fiction author
- Pearce Chiles (1899–?), American baseball player
- Rich Chiles (born 1949), American baseball player
- Walter Chiles (died 1653), Virginia colonial politician

Fictional characters:

- Jackie Chiles, fictional attorney on the American television series Seinfeld
