= Chile (disambiguation) =

Chile is a country in South America.

Chile may also refer to:

== Food ==
- Chile pepper, the spicy fruit of plants in the genus Capsicum
- Chile con queso, a dip and/or sauce made of melted cheese with roasted, chopped green chiles
- Chile powder
- Chile relleno, a battered, fried, cheese-stuffed green chile pepper
- Chile sauce
- New Mexico chile, a cultivar group of Capsicum annuum

== Taxonomy of peoples and animals ==
- Dingling, also known as Chile, an ancient Siberian people
- Tiele people, a collection of mostly Turkic tribes, associated by the Chinese with the Dingling
- Chile (brachiopod), a brachiopod genus

== See also ==
- Chiles (disambiguation)
- Chili (disambiguation)
- Chilly (disambiguation)
