= Chilly =

Chilly may refer to:

- Cold, i.e. low (or lower) temperature

== Entertainment ==
- Chilly (band), a 1970s German Euro disco/rock band
- Chilly McStuffins, a hypochondriac snowman in the American-Irish animated children's television series, Doc McStuffins
- Chilly Willy, a diminutive anthropomorphic penguin in the American animated children's television series, Woody Woodpecker
- Chilly Willy (wrestler) (born 1969), ring name of American professional wrestler William Jones

== Food ==
- Chiefly India: chili pepper, the spicy fruit of plants in the genus Capsicum
- Chiefly British: chili powder, dried, ground red chile peppers, sometimes with cumin and other spices
- Chiefly British: chili con carne, a stew-like dish in Mexican and Tex-Mex cuisine, (usually called "chili" in North American English)
- Chilly Cow, a brand of ice cream

== Places ==
=== France ===
- Chilly, Ardennes, in the Ardennes département
- Chilly, Haute-Savoie, in the Haute-Savoie département
- Chilly, Somme, in the Somme département
- Chilly-le-Vignoble, in the Jura département
- Chilly-Mazarin, in the Essonne département
- Chilly-sur-Salins, in the Jura département

=== Elsewhere ===
- Chilly, Idaho, a community in the United States

== See also ==
- Chile (disambiguation)
- Chili (disambiguation)
