= Chiles, Nariño =

Chiles
- Populated center
- Location in Nariño and Colombia Chiles (Colombia)
- Coordinates: 0°48′42.0″N 77°50′54.0″W
- Country: Colombia
- Department: Nariño
- Municipality: Cumbal Municipality
- Elevation: 10,144 ft (3,092 m)

Population (2005)
  - Total: 767
- Time zone: UTC-5 (Colombia Standard Time)

Chiles is a populated center of Colombia in Cumbal Municipality, Nariño Department in Colombia.

== Climate ==
Chiles has a subtropical highland climate (Köppen Csb) with moderate rainfall year-round and a dry season from July to September. Although afternoon temperatures are always pleasant, mornings are typically cold.

Climate data for Chiles
Month	Jan	Feb	Mar	Apr	May	Jun	Jul	Aug	Sep	Oct	Nov	Dec	Year
Mean daily maximum °C (°F)	15.3 (59.5)	15.2 (59.4)	15.3 (59.5)	15.5 (59.9)	15.3 (59.5)	14.7 (58.5)	14.2 (57.6)	14.4 (57.9)	15.1 (59.2)	15.7 (60.3)	15.7 (60.3)	15.3 (59.5)	15.1 (59.3)
Daily mean °C (°F)	10.5 (50.9)	10.5 (50.9)	10.6 (51.1)	10.8 (51.4)	10.5 (50.9)	10.1 (50.2)	9.7 (49.5)	9.7 (49.5)	10.2 (50.4)	10.7 (51.3)	10.7 (51.3)	10.8 (51.4)	10.4 (50.7)
Mean daily minimum °C (°F)	5.7 (42.3)	5.8 (42.4)	6.0 (42.8)	6.2 (43.2)	6.2 (43.2)	5.6 (42.1)	5.2 (41.4)	5.1 (41.2)	5.4 (41.7)	5.7 (42.3)	5.7 (42.3)	6.3 (43.3)	5.7 (42.4)
Average rainfall mm (inches)	94.8 (3.73)	79.5 (3.13)	113.7 (4.48)	139.5 (5.49)	121.2 (4.77)	68.6 (2.70)	43.1 (1.70)	31.7 (1.25)	48.3 (1.90)	111.6 (4.39)	123.6 (4.87)	104.1 (4.10)	1,079.7 (42.51)
Average rainy days	11	11	14	15	15	11	9	8	9	13	14	13	143
Source 1:
Source 2:
