= Cumbal =

- Municipality and town
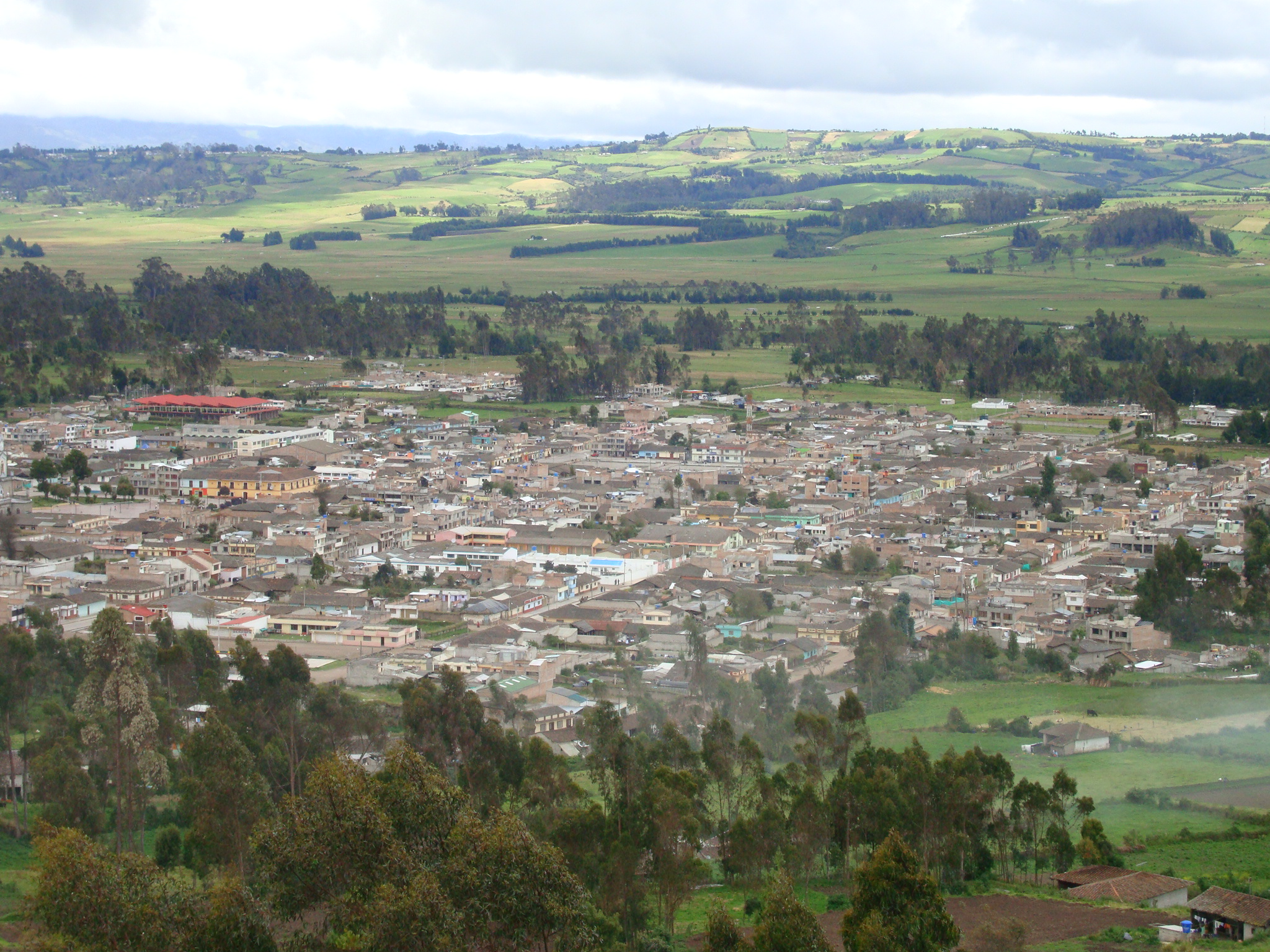
- View of Cumbal

- Flag

- Location of the municipality and town of Cumbal in the Nariño Department of Colombia
- Coordinates: 0°54′28″N 77°47′27″W
- Country: Colombia
- Department: Nariño Department

Population (2020 est.)
  - Total: 41,205
- Time zone: UTC-5 (Colombia Standard Time)

Cumbal is a town and municipality in the Nariño Department, Colombia.

Historically it is said that in 1529 the chief Cumbe founded a town with the name "Pavas" located at the foot of the Cumbal volcano, between the Blanco river and the Riochiquito gorge. Its inhabitants belonged to the grassland ethnic group. In the year 1547, its name was changed to Cumbal in honor of its founder. On December 14, 1923, due to a series of earthquakes that that area suffered, this settlement disappeared. The population was refounded on July 20, 1924, in another place and its municipal erection was carried out by Ordinance 59 of 1925.

== Geography ==
Cumbal is located 3172 meters above sea level. Indigenous homeland of the Pasto ethnic group in the district of Chiles. The territory of the municipality is mountainous, included within the areas of the Altiplano of Túquerres and Ipiales and the Nudo de los Pastos, standing out among its orographic accidents the Cumbal and Chiles volcanoes, with heights reaching 4,760 metres or 15,620 feet and the headwaters of the Buenavista, Colorado, Swallows, Hondon, Negro, Oreja, Panecillo, Picacho and Portachuelo Rivers. Due to the conformation of the relief, the cold and paramo thermal regions are presented, with an average temperature of 11 °C or 51.8 °F. The regions’s soils are generated by alluvia from the waters of the Blanco, Carchi, Chiquito, Imbina, Marino, Mayasquer, Nuevo Mundo, Salado and San Juan rivers.3

=== Climate ===
Cumbal has a comfortable subtropical highland climate (Köppen Cfb) with moderate rainfall year round.

Climate data for San Luis Airport, elevation 2,961 m (9,715 ft), (1981–2010)
Month	Jan	Feb	Mar	Apr	May	Jun	Jul	Aug	Sep	Oct	Nov	Dec	Year
Mean daily maximum °C (°F)	16.3 (61.3)	16.4 (61.5)	16.3 (61.3)	16.4 (61.5)	16.0 (60.8)	15.1 (59.2)	14.6 (58.3)	14.9 (58.8)	15.9 (60.6)	16.8 (62.2)	16.9 (62.4)	16.6 (61.9)	16.0 (60.8)
Daily mean °C (°F)	11.2 (52.2)	11.3 (52.3)	11.4 (52.5)	11.4 (52.5)	11.3 (52.3)	10.6 (51.1)	10.0 (50.0)	10.0 (50.0)	10.5 (50.9)	11.1 (52.0)	11.4 (52.5)	11.3 (52.3)	11.0 (51.8)
Mean daily minimum °C (°F)	5.8 (42.4)	6.0 (42.8)	6.4 (43.5)	6.6 (43.9)	6.6 (43.9)	6.0 (42.8)	5.1 (41.2)	4.6 (40.3)	4.6 (40.3)	5.6 (42.1)	6.2 (43.2)	6.2 (43.2)	5.8 (42.4)
Average precipitation mm (inches)	73.9 (2.91)	71.7 (2.82)	95.2 (3.75)	102.1 (4.02)	82.5 (3.25)	51.4 (2.02)	40.5 (1.59)	31.7 (1.25)	42.6 (1.68)	84.9 (3.34)	100.9 (3.97)	97.2 (3.83)	874.6 (34.43)
Average precipitation days	19	18	20	21	22	22	20	18	17	19	20	21	236
Average relative humidity (%)	83	83	84	85	85	85	84	82	81	82	83	84	83
Mean monthly sunshine hours	133.3	107.3	99.2	111.0	127.1	129.0	139.5	139.5	129.0	130.2	123.0	130.2	1,498.3
Mean daily sunshine hours	4.3	3.8	3.2	3.7	4.1	4.3	4.5	4.5	4.3	4.2	4.1	4.2	4.1
Source: Instituto de Hidrologia Meteorologia y Estudios Ambientales

== Limits ==
North with Ricaurte and Mallama, South with the Republic of Ecuador, East with Guachucal and Cuaspud; West with the Republic of Ecuador and Ricaurte.

emografía Ethnography According to the figures presented by DANE in the 2005 census, the ethnic composition of the municipality is: 4

Indigenous (93.0%) White and Mixed (7.0%)

== Foundation ==
Founded date: July 20, 1925

Name of the founder (s): Cumbal was founded by the Cacique CUMBE “phoneme that refers to the fact that the name of Cumbal is of Mayan origin.

== Historical review ==
After the earthquake of 1923, Cumbal is a population in two times: the old and the new, that of the brief one hung from the hill and the one that extends promisingly in the Plain of stones.

According to different historical versions, Cumbal was founded in 1529 by the Cacique CUMBE "phoneme that refers to the fact that the name of Cumbal is of Mayan origin, since its name comes from the name of the indigenous priest CHILLAN CAMBAL from the Yucatan Peninsula" .

Another version indicates that the old town of the Llano de Piedras, also originally called “PAVOS”, had its name changed to CUMBA in 1547.

After 1923, the Mr. Antonio María Pueyo de Val named it CUMBAL DE LAS MERCEDES. "Cumba" is the Quichua word that means loophole, that is, it swallows light or a small opening on the roof of the peasant houses mainly intended to dislodge the smoke from the interior. Appropriate name for the town located at the foot of the volcano.

Around 1713, as a curious pictorial document testifies, the old town of Cumbal consisted only of nine straw houses built around a chapel of the same characteristics; Another version affirms that "... the Mercedarians, in the mid-16th century, better said by the years 1561 to 1566, evangelized the Pasture Indians and taking advantage of them for civilian life founded the towns that since then were called Guachucal, Muellamués, Cumbal, Colimba, Yascual ”.

According to UHLE, Max in his study on the Carchi and Imbabura civilizations, National Typographical Workshops Quito, 1933 in relation to Cumbal says: The first town was located under the quarry in several Resguardos that now belong to the Cuaical Section. In 1907, Fray Ramón España de Segovia, parish priest of Cumbal, transferred the town of La Cantera to the Hill of the Old Town, in the place called “Guamucos” and Bishop Antonio Maria Pueyo de Val blessed and solemnly placed it, eight days after the disaster of 1923 the first stones of the Church and the Municipal House.
