= Chilii =

Chilii may refer to several villages in Romania:

- Chilii, a village in Mioarele Commune, Argeș County
- Chilii, a village in Valea Ursului Commune, Neamţ County
- Chilii, a village in Dobrun Commune, Olt County
- Chilii (river), Vilyuy basin, Yakutia
