= Chris Childs =

Chris Childs may refer to:

- Chris Childs (basketball) (born 1967), American basketball player
- Chris Childs (bassist) (born 1959), English bass player
