= Chili, Illinois =

- Unincorporated community
- Location within Illinois Location within the United States
- Coordinates: 40°13′04″N 91°08′30″W
- Country: United States
- State: Illinois
- County: Hancock
- Elevation: 682 ft (208 m)
- Time zone: UTC-6 (Central (CST))
  - Summer (DST): UTC-5 (CDT)
- Area code: 217
- GNIS feature ID: 406063

Chili is an unincorporated community in Chili Township, Hancock County, Illinois, United States. Chili is located on County Route 10, 4.5 miles (7.2 km) west-southwest of Bowen. Chili consists of mostly farmland, a few homes, one auto repair shop, and the Chili Township Cemetery.
