= James Chiles =

James J. Chiles (May 1, 1833 – September 21, 1873), also known as Jim Crow Chiles, was a Confederate outlaw who fought with Quantrill's Raiders.

== Personal life ==
Born on May 1, 1833, Chiles was from a Jackson County, Missouri family. His father, James Chiles, was a state senator. Chiles married Sarah Ann Young in 1861, when she was 16 years of age. Her sister was Martha Ellen Young Truman, the mother of President Harry S. Truman.

Initially, Chiles seemed like a good husband for Sarah Young. He came from a family that held a lot of land and were early settlers in the county. In fact, he was "a highly unsavory character… the dark side of frontier life, a future skeleton for the Young-Truman family closet." He was described as someone who could be good-natured, "but subject to violent fits of anger, and when angry, a very dangerous man." In 1857, a man commented on Chiles' table manners, and Chiles killed him. He was tried for murder, but was not convicted, in part due to his family name.

He received the nickname Jim Crow for his skill in dancing the song-and-dance caricature of blacks, the Jim Crow Set. Chiles and his brothers Elijah and Henry were fined in Jackson County in the 1850s for racing and gambling on Sunday. His father and father-in-law, Soloman Young, were pro-slavery.

== Civil War raider ==
During the American Civil War, Chiles rode with William Quantrill and Bloody Bill Anderson. The gang included some of the most infamous raiders of the time, including Jesse and Frank James, the Younger Brothers, and Ike Flannery. They and Chiles raided and burned many pro-union towns and caused havoc for many union supporters and northern families. One of the best known raids that Chiles can be associated with is the infamous Lawrence Massacre in August 1863. The gang killed more than 150 men and boys and burned most of the town.

In 1863, Chiles established a combination saloon, gambling house, and hotel in Sherman, Texas. It was also his home. He received many "refugees" from Jackson County. Chiles fought with two men over gambling disputes and killed both of them.

== Post-war life ==
Due to Chiles activities during the war, and the anti-Confederate sentiment in Missouri following the war, Chiles had a difficult time adjusting to normal life. For instance, people who had been supportive of Confederates were not allowed to get certain jobs, vote, or hold office. In Kansas City, he ran a saloon and gambling house.

Chiles was wanted on indictments for three other murders and accused of killing nine additional men. On September 21, 1873, he was killed by Deputy Marshal James Peacock during a confrontation in downtown Independence, Missouri. Peacock (who survived with Chiles' bullet lodged in his spine) was then shot by Chiles' son, Elijah, who was shot and killed by Peacock's son, Charles.
