= Sheikh Chilli (folklore) =

Character in South Asian folklore

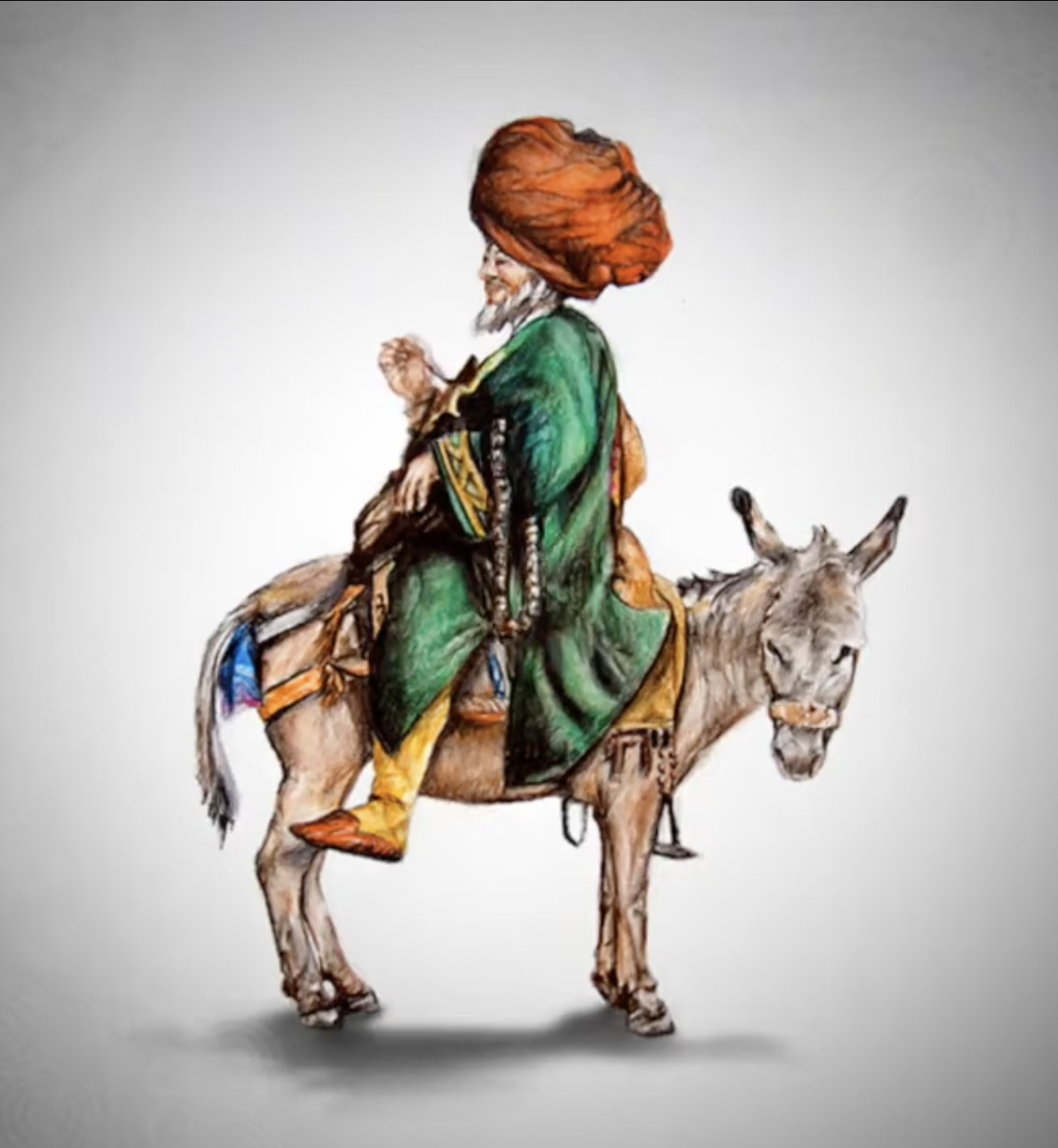
- Illustration of Sheikh Chilli

In-universe information
- Race: South Asian
- Family: Widowed mother
- Religion: Muslim

Sheikh Chilli or Shaikh Chilli is a comical figure in the folklore of India and Pakistan. He is often described in children's literature and joke books as a fool or simpleton who fails at every task he attempts. Another characterisation of Sheikh Chilli is as a daydreamer who "builds castles in the air". He is also described as a braggart. Many popular Sheikh Chilli stories contain simple life lessons or morals.

Literary scholars have classified Sheikh Chilli stories as a type of Indian "numskull tale" in which the hero behaves in a peculiar way and suffers the consequences of his own foolishness or folly. He has been called the Indian version of Don Quixote and compared to the hapless character of Hans in Grimms' Fairy Tales. Certain Sheikh Chilli tales are classified as "son-in-law" stories that poke fun from the perspective of the bride's family.

== History ==
=== Origins ===
The exact origins of Sheikh Chilli are unclear. Sheikh Chilli stories have been told for generations in India and Pakistan. In the stories, he is described as a Muslim shaikh and the son of a poor widow.

The character from folklore is often associated with the Sufi saint called Sheikh Chilli, buried at Sheikh Chilli's Tomb, a historical landmark in Haryana, India. According to writer Anupa Lai, one theory holds that Sheikh Chilli was a person born in Balochistan (now part of Pakistan) who worked in Haryana for the nawab of Jhajjar, became a fakir late in life, and died in Kurukshetra. However, several writers have questioned whether the Sheikh Chilli of folklore is based on a real person at all.

=== Folk Tales of Hindustan ===
In 1907, Sris Chandra Basu wrote a series of folk tales in The Modern Review magazine using Shaikh Chilli as his pen name. A collection of ten tales was published in 1908 and 1913 as Folk Tales of Hindustan.

In the tales, Shaikh Chilli is presented as a storyteller or narrator similar to Princess Scheherazade in The Arabian Nights, rather than as the main character. Some of the tales borrow plots directly from that work, combining elements from ancient fables and tales such as the Panchatantra, the Jatakas, and the Vetala Panchavimshati. Others are more similar to the Sheikh Chilli "fool" stories, but are told as though they happened to a friend.

=== Tales of Sheikh Chilli ===
Other collections of Sheikh Chilli stories include Sheikh Chilli ke kisse (Tale of Sheikh Chilli) and Sheikh Chilli ke karname (The Adventures of Sheikh Chilli) in Hindi.

== Folktales ==
=== Sheikh Chilli and the Egg ===
There are several variations of the tale of Sheikh Chilli and the egg. In one version, Sheikh Chilli finds an egg in the street. He daydreams about hatching the egg into a chicken that will lay more eggs, and eventually owning his own poultry farm.

In other versions, Sheikh Chilli is offered a gold coin by a rich merchant in exchange for carrying his goods to a destination. He accepts the task but daydreams about becoming rich by buying hens that will lay eggs, then goats, then cows, eventually trading up to start his own dairy farm. He imagines becoming so wealthy that his children must beg him to come home. Shaking his head and protesting "no, no, no," he drops the glass he has been carrying, which shatters on the ground and angers the merchant, leaving him with nothing.

=== "Sar mathe pe" ===
In one tale, Sheikh Chilli receives an invitation to visit his mother-in-law. Before he leaves, his own mother instructs him to accept everything he is offered humbly and gladly. At dinner, his mother-in-law serves a lavish meal, but Sheikh Chilli turns down each dish in turn. Finally, as his mother-in-law pleads with him to eat, he recalls his own mother's advice and pours the hot curries over his head. When his relatives look at him in shock, he explains that his mother told him to accept everything "sar mathe pe" (on his head).

The punchline is based on the Hindi expression "sar māthe pe swīkar karna", which literally means "accept on your head and forehead" and figuratively means "accept unquestioningly". The tale is popular in Uttar Pradesh, Madhya Pradesh, and Bihar.

== In popular culture ==
=== Magazines ===
- In 1889, a writer using the pen name Sheikh Chilli published "The Story of the Seven Princes" in The Indian Magazine.
- Sheikh Chilli is a popular character in Lotpot, a comic magazine published by Mayapuri Group.

=== Film ===
- Adventures of Sheikh Chilli (1942) is a film directed by Kikubhai B. Desai and produced by Paramount Movietone.
- Sheikh Chilli (1958) is a Pakistani Urdu film directed by Asif Jah.

=== Television ===
- Sheikh Chilli and Friendz is an animated television series featuring a sweet and innocent nine-year-old boy named Sheikh Chilli. The series has 104 episodes of eleven minutes each.

=== Comedy ===
- Sheikh Chilli is the stage name of comedian Hari Ram Toofan of Kinapur village in Ghaziabad.

=== Theatre ===
- In 2001, Avijit Dutt staged I'm Not Sheikh Chilli, an adaptation of I'm Not Rappaport by Herb Gardner.

=== Music ===
- In 2018, Indian rapper Raftaar released "Sheikh Chilli", a diss track against Emiway Bantai.

== See also ==
- Nasreddin
- Birbal
- Tenali Rama
