= Chili Township, Hancock County, Illinois =

Chili Township
- Township
- Township building in Bowen

- Location in Hancock County

- Hancock County's location in Illinois
- Coordinates: 40°14′40″N 91°05′18″W
- Country: United States
- State: Illinois
- County: Hancock
- Established: November 6, 1849

Area
  - Total: 37.79 sq mi (97.9 km^{2})
  - Land: 37.77 sq mi (97.8 km^{2})
  - Water: 0.03 sq mi (0.078 km^{2}) 0.07%
- Elevation: 679 ft (207 m)

Population (2020)
  - Total: 630
  - Density: 17/sq mi (6.4/km^{2})
- Time zone: UTC-6 (CST)
  - Summer (DST): UTC-5 (CDT)
- ZIP codes: 62313, 62316, 62321, 62367, 62380
- FIPS code: 17-067-14104

Chili Township is one of twenty-four townships in Hancock County, in the U.S. state of Illinois. As of the 2020 census, its population was 630 and it contained 268 housing units.

== History ==
Chili Township was one of the original 19 townships of Hancock County, receiving its name and boundaries in a report submitted to the county commissioners in February 1850. It took its name from Carthage, the county seat. At the time, Chili was the township's sole postal community; Bowen (originally Chili Centre) was not established until 1857.

As originally drawn, the township covered all of Town 3 North Range 6 West of the fourth principal meridian, as well as the south half of the survey township to the north. In 1854, the northern half-township was taken away to form Harmony Township.

== Geography ==
According to the 2021 census gazetteer files, Chili Township has a total area of 37.79 square miles (97.88 km^{2}), of which 37.77 square miles (97.82 km^{2}) (or 99.93%) is land and 0.03 square miles (0.08 km^{2}) (or 0.07%) is water.

=== Cities, towns, villages ===
- Bowen

=== Unincorporated towns ===
- Chili at 40.217824°N 91.141529°W

(This list is based on USGS data and may include former settlements.)

=== Cemeteries ===
The township contains these five cemeteries: Bowen, Chili, Forsyth, Old Sixteen and Payne.

=== Major highways ===
- Illinois Route 61
- Illinois Route 94

=== Airports and landing strips ===
- Crossland Landing Strip

== Demographics ==
Historical population
Census	Pop.	Note	%±
1860	1,028		—
1870	1,601		55.7%
1880	1,418		−11.4%
1890	1,296		−8.6%
1900	1,388		7.1%
1910	1,436		3.5%
1920	1,430		−0.4%
1930	1,259		−12.0%
1940	1,157		−8.1%
1950	1,009		−12.8%
1960	940		−6.8%
1970	779		−17.1%
1980	773		−0.8%
1990	693		−10.3%
2000	718		3.6%
2010	657		−8.5%
2020	630		−4.1%
U.S. Decennial Census

As of the 2020 census there were 630 people, 269 households, and 172 families residing in the township. The population density was 16.67 inhabitants per square mile (6.44/km^{2}). There were 268 housing units at an average density of 7.09 per square mile (2.74/km^{2}). The racial makeup of the township was 93.33% White, 0.32% African American, 0.63% Native American, 0.63% Asian, 0.00% Pacific Islander, 0.32% from other races, and 4.76% from two or more races. Hispanic or Latino of any race were 0.95% of the population.

There were 269 households, out of which 30.10% had children under the age of 18 living with them, 55.39% were married couples living together, 5.58% had a female householder with no spouse present, and 36.06% were non-families. 32.30% of all households were made up of individuals, and 9.30% had someone living alone who was 65 years of age or older. The average household size was 2.65 and the average family size was 3.41.

The township's age distribution consisted of 28.8% under the age of 18, 5.2% from 18 to 24, 24.5% from 25 to 44, 29.2% from 45 to 64, and 12.3% who were 65 years of age or older. The median age was 38.5 years. For every 100 females, there were 99.2 males. For every 100 females age 18 and over, there were 108.2 males.

The median income for a household in the township was $58,661, and the median income for a family was $61,346. Males had a median income of $42,604 versus $17,386 for females. The per capita income for the township was $23,227. About 7.6% of families and 16.7% of the population were below the poverty line, including 17.1% of those under age 18 and 19.3% of those age 65 or over.

== School districts ==
- Southeastern Community Unit School District 337

== Political districts ==
- Illinois's 18th congressional district
- State House District 93
- State House District 94
- State Senate District 47
