= Sheikh Chilli (Sufi scholar) =

17th century Sufi scholar in Mughal Empire

Sheikh Chehli
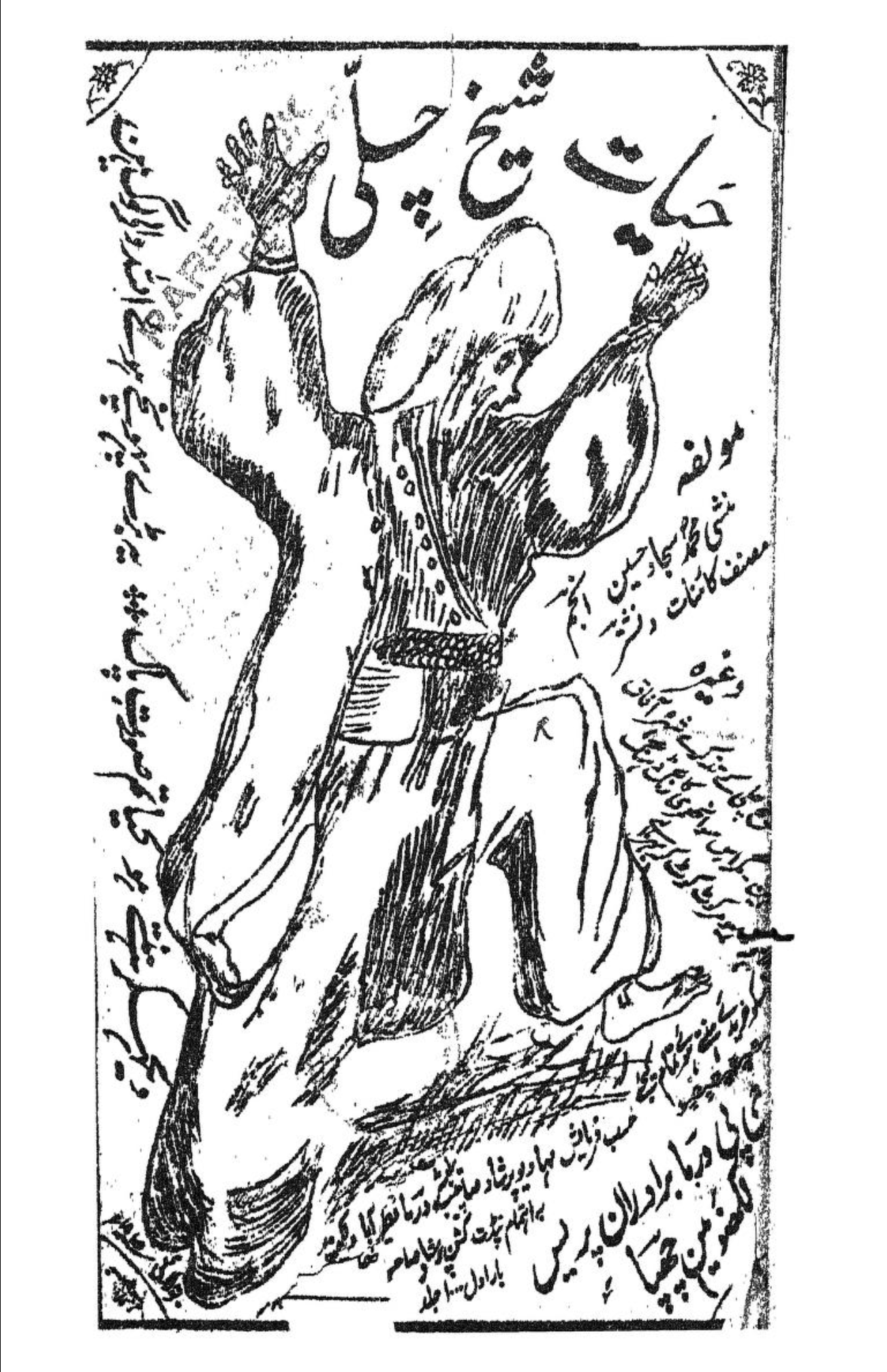
- Cover of Hayat e Shaikh Chilli (c. 1901)
- Died: 1650; Thaneshwar, Mughal Empire
- Resting place: Sheikh Chilli's Tomb
- Other name: Abd-ur-Rahim Abdul-Karim Abd-ur-Raza
- Occupation: Sufi scholar

Sheikh Chilli or Sheikh Chehli or Shaikh Chilli (died c. 1650) was a Sufi scholar of the Qadriya order in India. Although his name is the subject of debate, he is often referred to as Abd-ur-Rahim Abdul-Karim Abd-ur-Razak, and described as a Sufi saint. He is buried at Sheikh Chilli's Tomb, located on a hill in Thanesar, Kurukshetra, in Haryana. Built out of white marble and sandstone with a pearl-shaped dome, the tomb complex of Sheikh Chilli is often compared to the Taj Mahal due to its sophisticated Mughal architecture. It was likely built by Mughal prince Dara Shikoh, the eldest son of emperor Shah Jahan. Recent scholarship suggests that Sheikh Chilli may have been a teacher at the madrassa next to the tomb.

== Name and identity ==
The question of who is actually buried at Sheikh Chilli's Tomb is debated by historians. In the 1860s, British archaeological surveyor Alexander Cunningham wrote that the real name of the spiritual teacher buried in the tomb was in dispute, but that he was referred to locally as "Sheikh Chilli" or "Sheikh Tilli".

"Sheikh Chilli" is an honorific rather than a name. "Chilli" may be a corruption of "Chehli", which means 40 in Persian. As a title, it describes someone who performs the 40-day chilla or meditation and fast in solitude.

=== Sheikh Chilli versus Sheikh Chilli ===
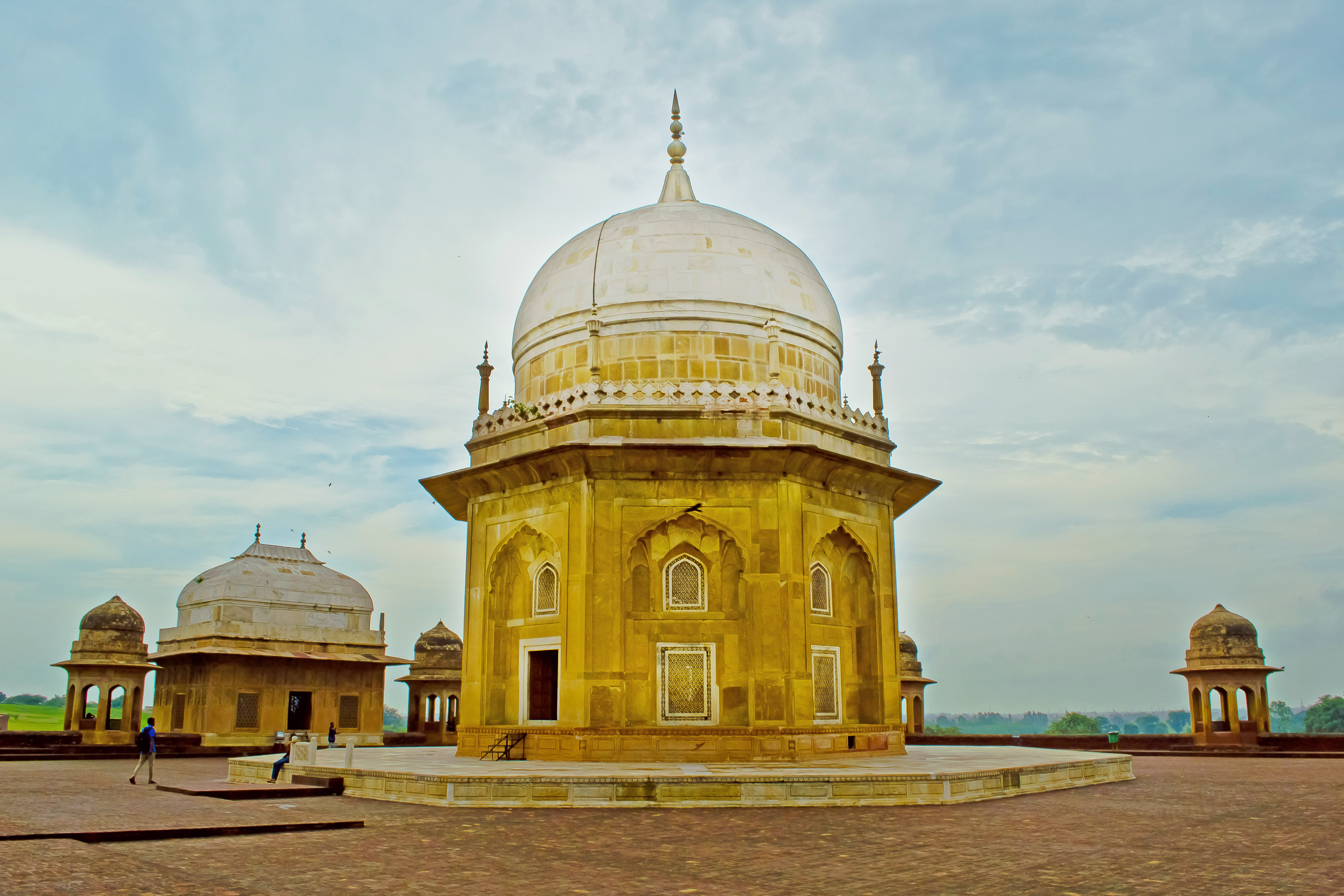
Main building of Sheikh Chilli's Tomb complex

The Sufi scholar called Sheikh Chilli is sometimes associated with the Sheikh Chilli of folklore – a comedic figure described as a braggart, fool, and daydreamer in Indian and Pakistani folktales. However, historians have questioned whether the character from folklore is actually based on the person buried in the tomb. The Sufi scholar is also confused with the author of The Folk Tales of Hindustan (1908), who wrote under the pen name "Shaikh Chilli".

Noting a possible connection, Farzand Ahmed wrote in India Today that the Sheikh Chilli of folklore is "venerated as the saint of laughter and wit" who is "loved by children for his stupidity".

=== Possible names ===
Since the mid-19th century, historians have recorded several possible names for Sheikh Chilli who is commemorated by the tomb.

==== Abdul Karim ====
Abdul Karim was a diwan or finance minister for Dara Shikoh. He was named in the Sair-i-Punjab, an 1850s travelogue, which misidentified him as one of Akbar's viziers.

The name is one of three mentioned in the 1862–1865 report by the Archaeological Survey of India, and a 1888–1889 ASI report suggests that Abdul Karim was from Bannur. Art historian Subhash Parihar argues that a Mughal finance administrator with no scholarly or religious background would not have had such a tomb and madrassa erected in his honour.

==== Abdur Rahim or Abdul Razak ====
"Abdul Rahim" was mentioned as one of the three names associated with the tomb by Sir Alexander Cunningham in his report for the written for the Archaeological Survey of India between 1862 and 1865. "Abd-ur Rahim" is also mentioned in the 1888–1889 ASI report written by Charles J. Rodgers. Another name mentioned by Cunningham in his ASI report was "Abdul Razak".

==== Abdul Qadir ====
Abdul Qadir of Bannur was identified as the real name for Sheikh Chilli by Punjabi Sikh scholar and encyclopedist Bhai Kahan Singh Nabha.

== Early life and education ==
The question of where the Sufi scholar Sheikh Chilli was born and educated is also the subject of speculation. One theory is that he was originally from Iran, and traveled through India to preach Islam.

=== Hayat-e-Shaikh Chilli ===
In 1901, Munshi Sajjad Hussain published a biographical novel about the Sufi saint titled Hayat-e-Shaikh Chilli (The Life of Shaikh Chilli). In the novel, he suggests that Shaikh Chilli was a descendant of a Tatar trader of sheep and goats from the Transoxiana region who migrated to India.

According to Hussain, Shaikh Chilli was sent to school in his local mosque at the age of eight, and had learned to read the Quran in about a year. He describes the young Shaikh Chilli as an intelligent, hard-working student and avid reader whose father frequently bought him new books.

In the novel, Hussain portrays Shaikh Chilli as respectful toward his teacher and accepting of punishment, even when he is wrongfully blamed by his friends for their misdeeds. By the time he left school at the age 15, Hussain writes, Shaikh Chilli had distinguished himself through his exceptional memory and handwriting, as well as his wisdom.

== Career ==
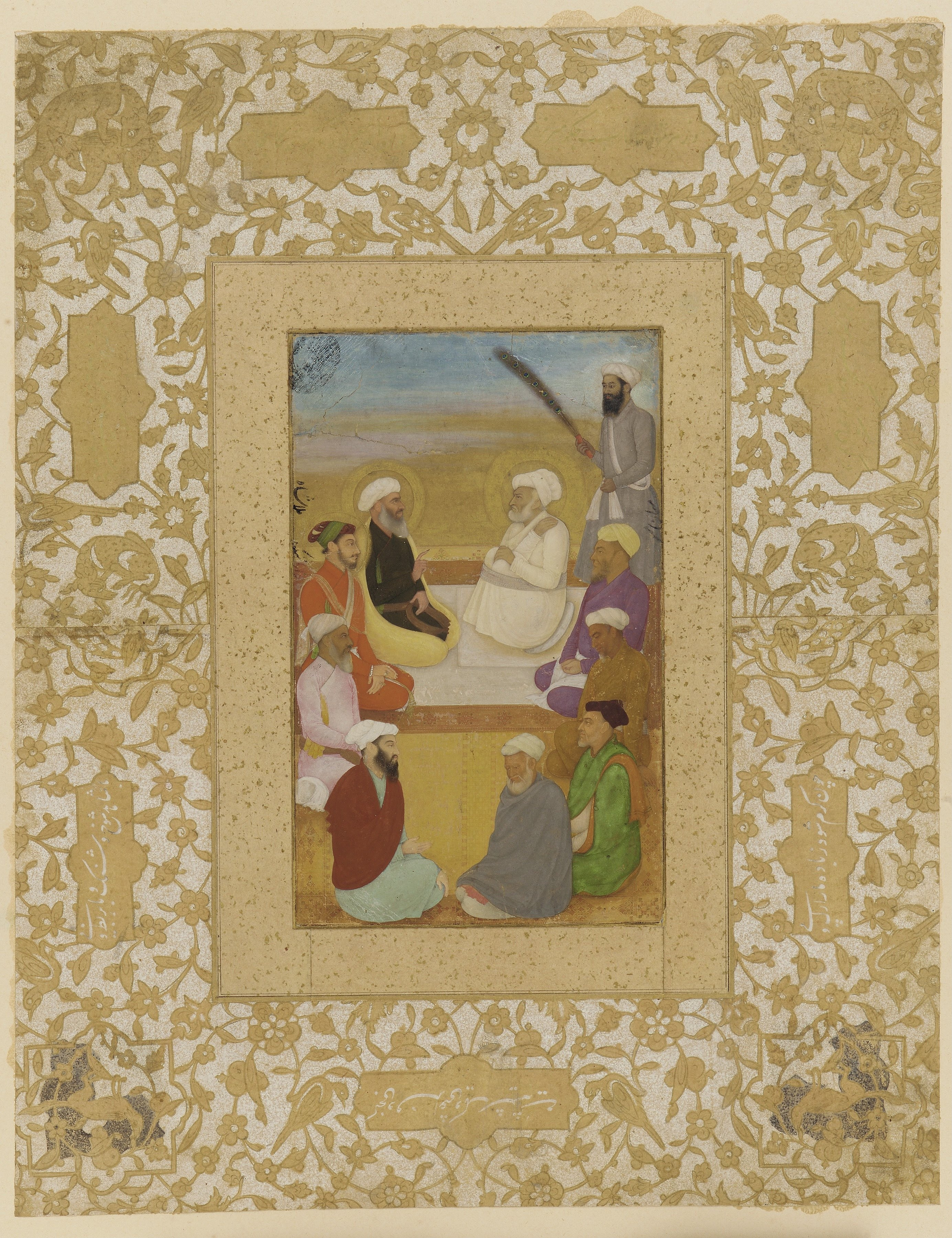
Dara Shikoh with Mian Mir and Mullah Shah Badakhshi

Since the 1862–1865 report by Alexander Cunningham, Sheikh Chilli of Thanesar is often described as a spiritual advisor to 17th-century Mughal prince Dara Shikoh. However, modern historians including Subhash Parihar and Rana Safvi dispute this claim, pointing out that Dara Shikoh was a follower of Mullah Shah Badakhshi of Kashmir, a Sufi of the Qadriya order who is buried in Lahore. Mullah Shah Badakhshi was the successor to Mian Mir, who first introduced Dara Shikoh to the Qadiri Sufi in 1833. In 1840, Mullah Shah Badakshi officially initiated Dara Shikoh as a murid.

Although Sheikh Chilli is described as a Sufi saint, historians have been unable to find a person matching his description in existing records of notable saints from Thanesar. The most important saint from Thanesar during the period, Sheikh Jalaluddin Thanesari, has his own tomb nearby.

=== Madrassa in Thanesar ===
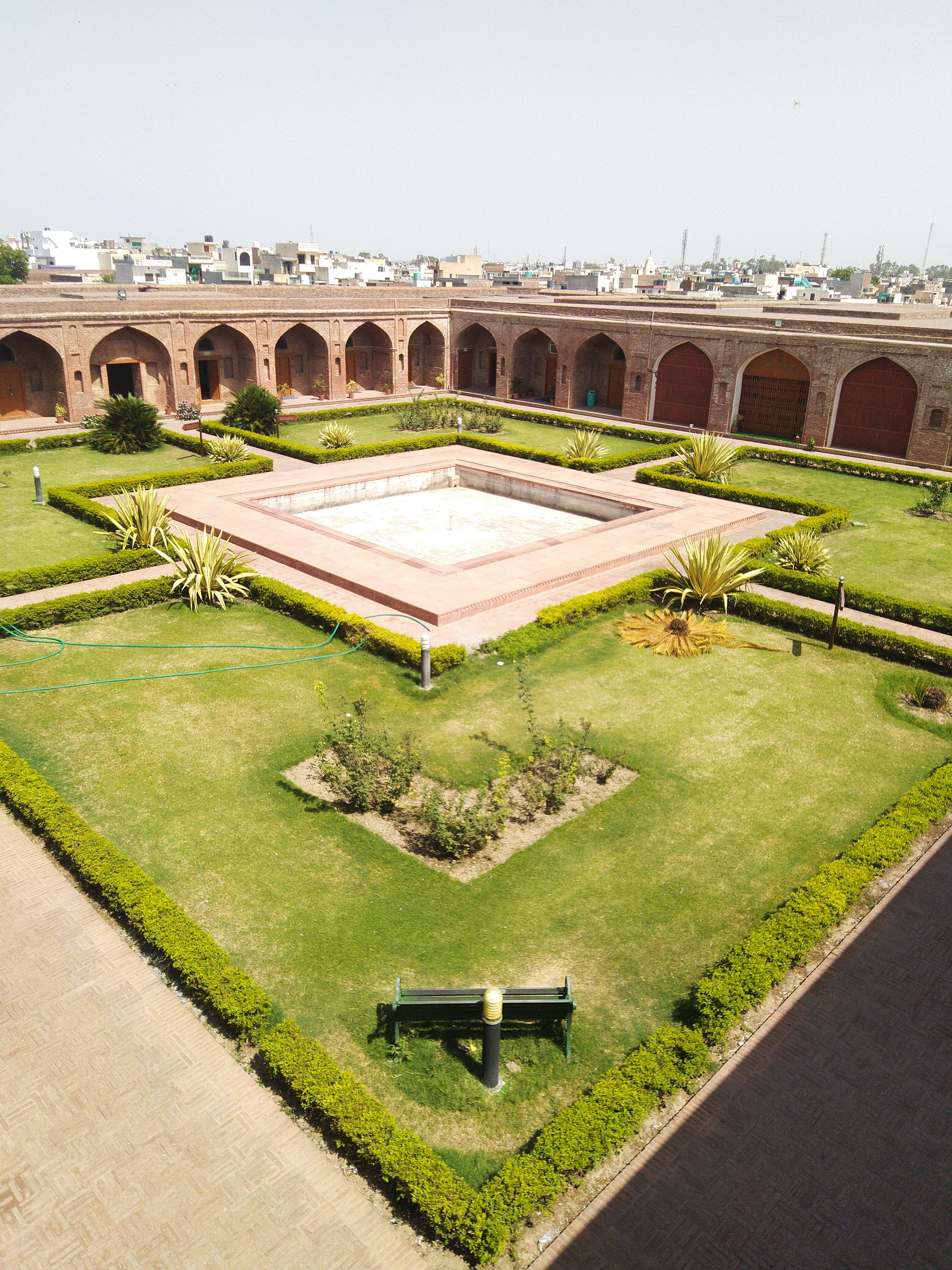
Madrassa courtyard surrounded by gallery with arches next to Sheikh Chilli's Tomb

Recent scholarship suggests that Sheikh Chilli of Thanesar may have been a teacher in the madrassa there. In the Mughal Empire, madrassas were a place of study for the Islamic clergy or ulema preparing for civil or judicial service. Building madrassas next to the tomb of the founder or scholar who taught there was an established practice in India at the time, as it was elsewhere. Parihar's research has focused on the courtyard and rooms that form the madrassa next to Sheikh Chilli's Tomb.

Safvi writes that it is plausible that the madrassa at Thanesar was established by Dara Shikoh to promote the Qadriya order, because the Chishti order was so dominant there.

== Personal life and legacy ==
Sheikh Chilli of Thanesar was likely married. A second tomb next to the main tomb of Sheikh Chilli is often identified as his wife's. Made of red sandstone, it has a marble dome and carvings of a floral design. However, Parihar writes that there actually are two graves within the main tomb of Sheikh Chilli, one of which likely belongs to his wife, and that the second tomb is probably for another scholar and his wife.

As of 1883, the madrassa next to the tomb was the still in use as a school for Muslim and Hindu children learning Punjabi and Persian. As of 2019, Sheikh Chilli's Tomb remains one of the monuments managed by the Archaeological Survey of India.
