= Sheikh Chilli's Tomb =

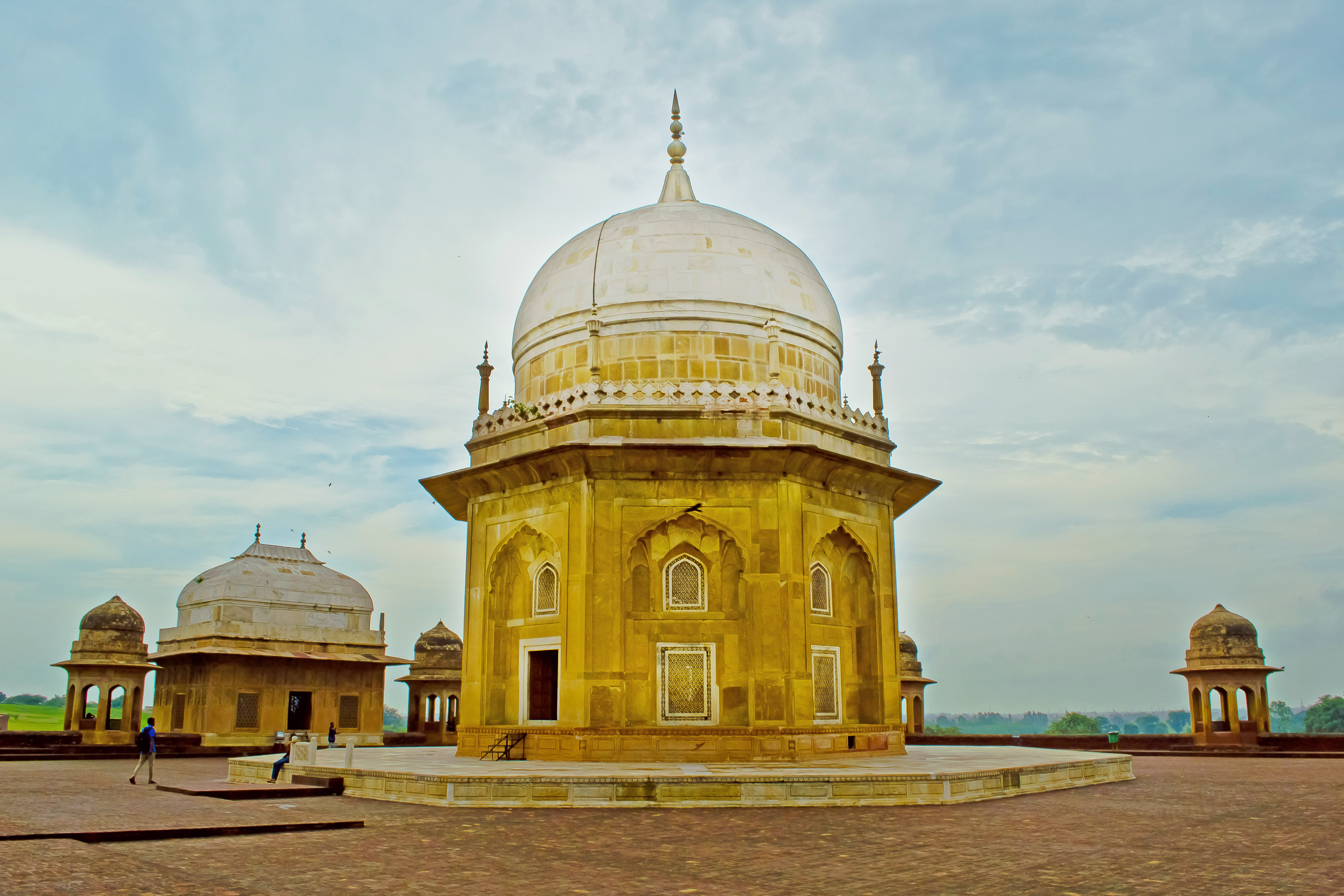
- Interactive map of Sheikh Chilli's Tomb
- 29°58′36″N 76°49′41″E
- Location: Thanesar, Haryana, India

Site notes
- Architectural style: Mughal architecture

Sheikh Chilli's Tomb is complex of structures located in Thanesar, in the Kurukshetra district of Haryana, India. It includes two tombs, a madrasa, Mughal gardens and various subsequent features.

== Description ==
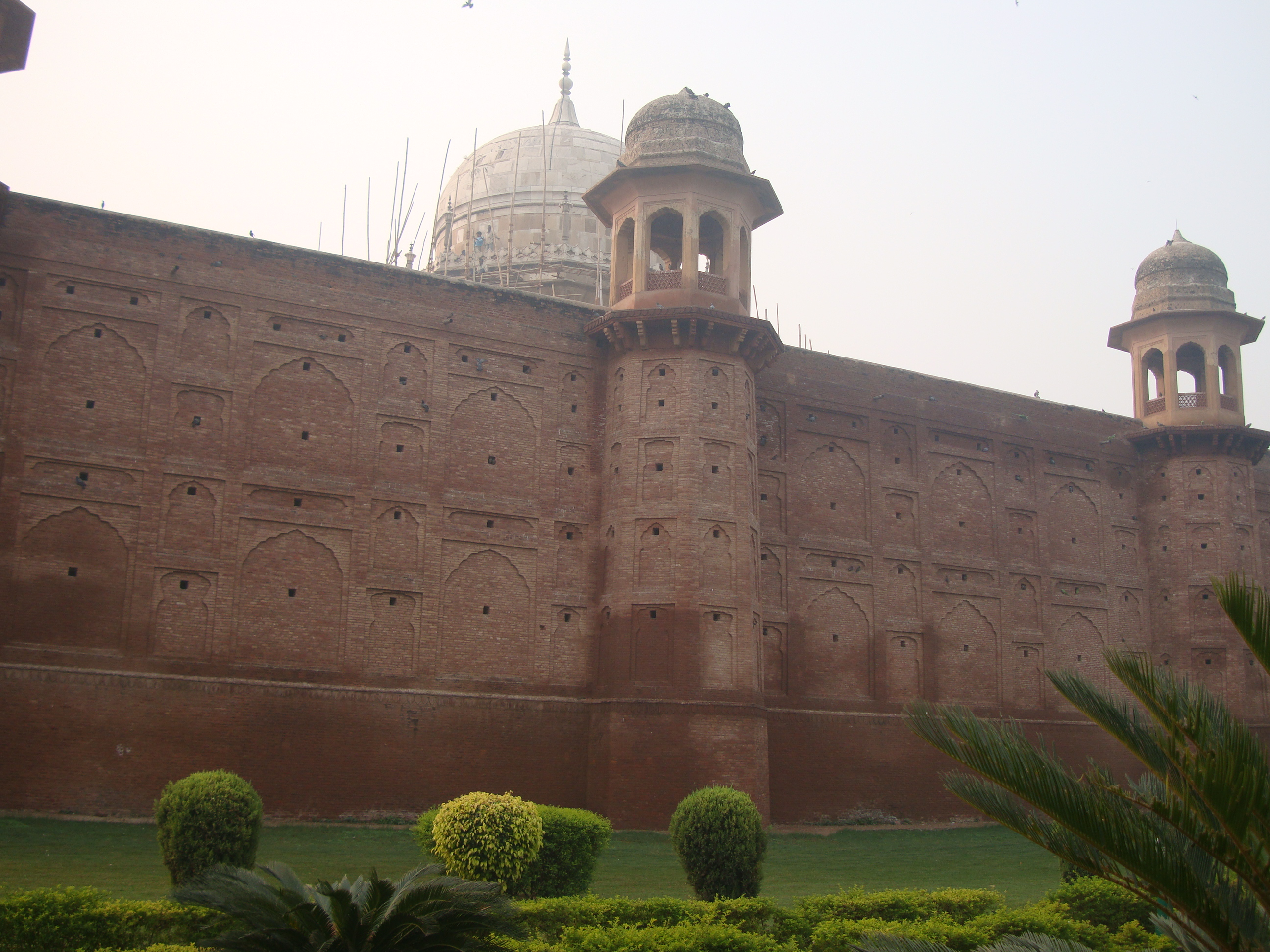
Outer walls of Sheikh Chilli's Tomb complex

The main tomb belongs to a Sufi scholar called Abd-ur-Rahim Abdul-Karim Abd-ur-Razak, popularly known by the name of Sheikh Chilli. The tomb was likely built by Mughal Prince Dara Shikoh. The architectural plan of the tomb shows considerable Persian influence. There is another tomb in the complex, believed to be of Sheikh Chilli's wife. This beautiful tomb and attached Madrasa are associated with the Sufi Saint Abd-ur-Rahim. There is a mosque called Pather Masjid (Stone Mosque) that was built in red sandstone. On the north side are the Mughal Gardens. The ceiling of the mosque, resting on pillars is decorated with floral designs carved in low relief. The pillars are also profusely decorated with floral designs, while the bases over the mouldings show chaitya-window motifs. The Qibla in the centre of the western wall is flanked on either side by two arched niches inscribed with verses from the Quran. The masonry terrace forming the front court was added at a later date. The masjid is assignable to the seventeenth Century A.D. Adjoining the southern flank of the complex (i.e. north of the tomb of Sheikh Chilli) is a large sized building which on account of both stratigraphic evidence and style of construction appears to be a garden complex following the pattern of a typical Mughal Garden and is divided into four equal, symmetrical parts (the charbagh pattern) with a square hauz in the centre. Water to the hauz (tank) was supplied by terracotta pipes from the east, concealed within the wall.

On the eastern side of the central hauz there is a small rectangular tank connected with a raised open drain coming from further east. The tank had on the northern side a small cistern having cussed patterns on both longitudinal ends and a copper fountain in the center. The water used to run through a concealed conduit pipe provided below the lime plastered surface, meant for the flow of water from the cascade. The Park now popular as the Harshvardhan Park is entered through an elaborate double storey gateway, located in the center of the eastern wall from which one of the paths leads to all its four sides, hosting on the exterior, a series of double roomed chambers, on three sides i.e., the east, north and west respectively with provision of niches and alcoves on its walls. The western wing of this sarai however had double storeyed chambers which could be reached through a flight of steps provided at the center and towards the extreme south-western corner. Exactly opposite to the main entrance gateway was another majestic structure, constructed just like the main entrance gateway. However this structure didn't carry any entrance from the ground floor, but had an opening towards the west on the upper storey. This opening on the upper floor gave a direct accessibility from the Raja Harsha-ka- Tila located west of the sarai and the chamber is constructed in such a way that probably this was the place from where an authority used to address the gathering below within the sarai. West of the tomb are the ruins of Harsh-ka- Tila. Excavations conducted at this site revealed a continuous habitation at the site from about the first century A.D. to the late Mughal period. The findings of a few sherds of painted Grey Ware along with associated plain grey, black-slipped and red wares in pre-Kushana levels also suggest the inhabitation of the site in the first millennium B.C.

On the basis of various identifiable remains, the excavations revealed a sequence of six cultural periods. These are the Kushana period (1st-3rd century AD) Gupta period (4th-6th century AD) Post Gupta or Vardhana period (6th-7th cent AD) Rajput 8th-12th cent AD) and Mughal period (16th-19th cent AD). The monument is closed only on Fridays. Visitors are charged Citizens of India and visitors of SAARC (Bangladesh, Nepal, Bhutan, Sri Lanka, Pakistan, Maldives and Afghanistan) and BIMSTEC Countries (Bangladesh, Nepal, Bhutan, Sri Lanka, Thailand and Myanmar) - Rs. 25 per head. Rs. 100/- or $2 for Foreigners. The monument is open to the public from 9.00 a.m to 5.00 p.m.

== Gallery ==
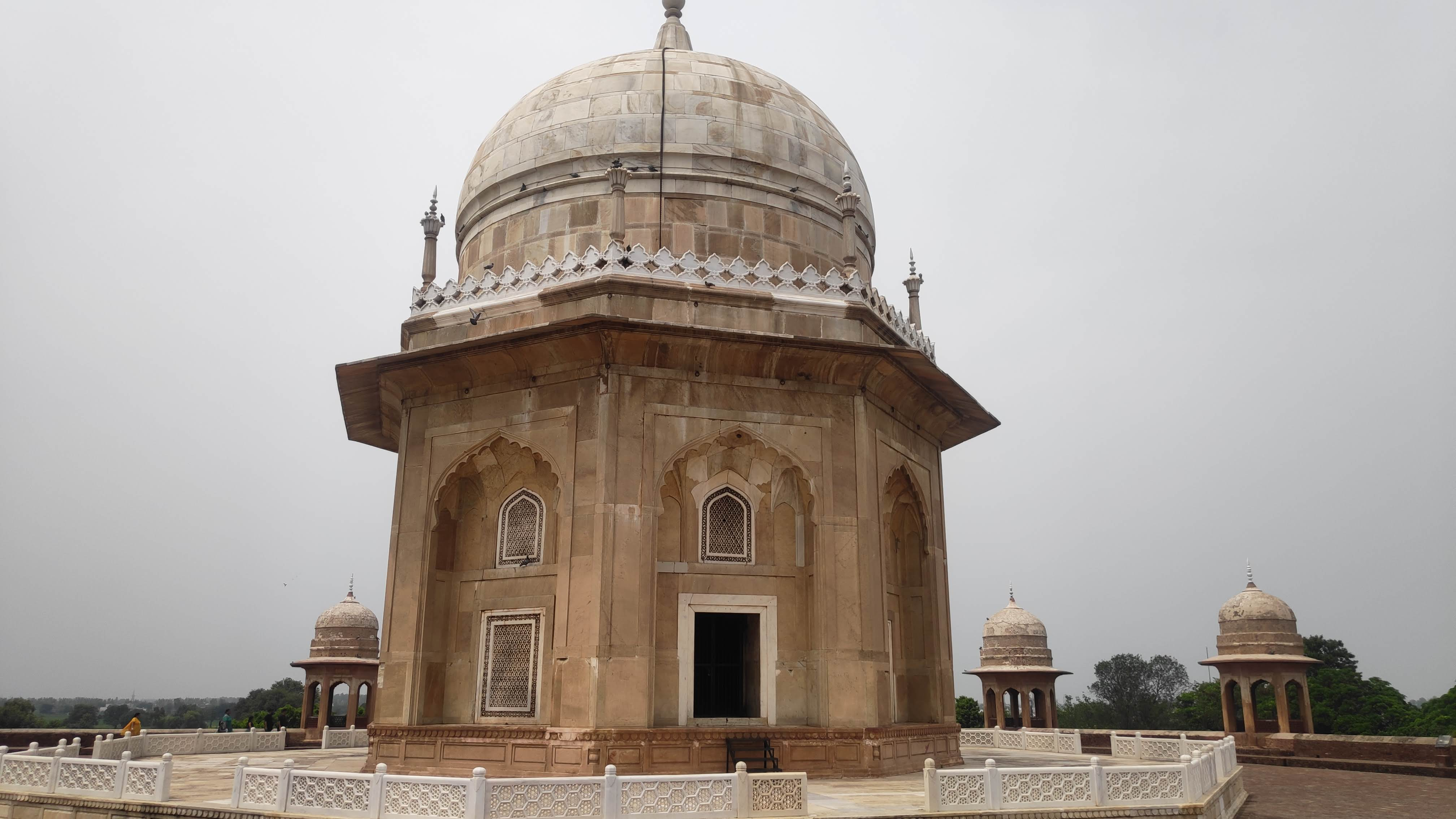

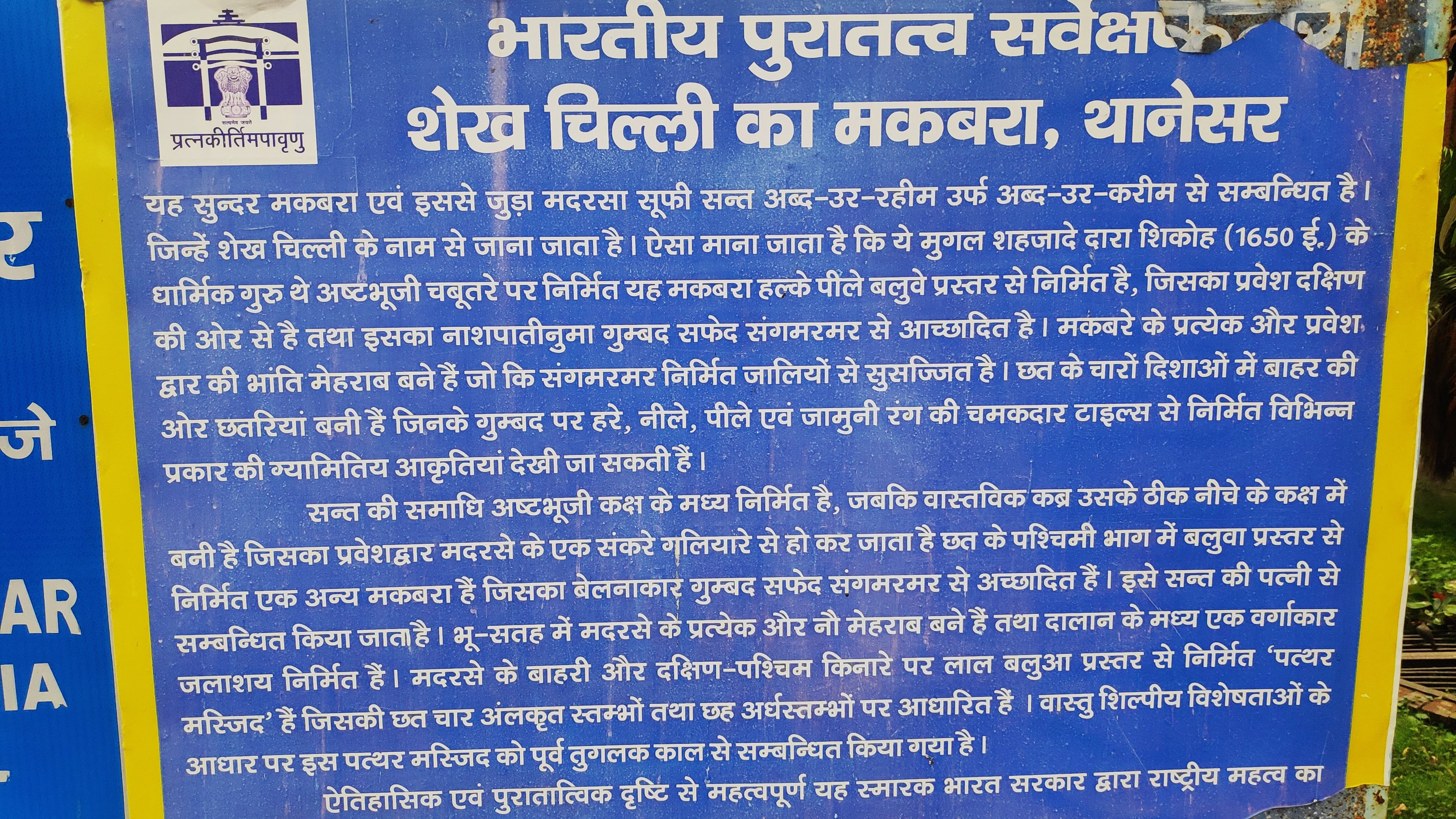

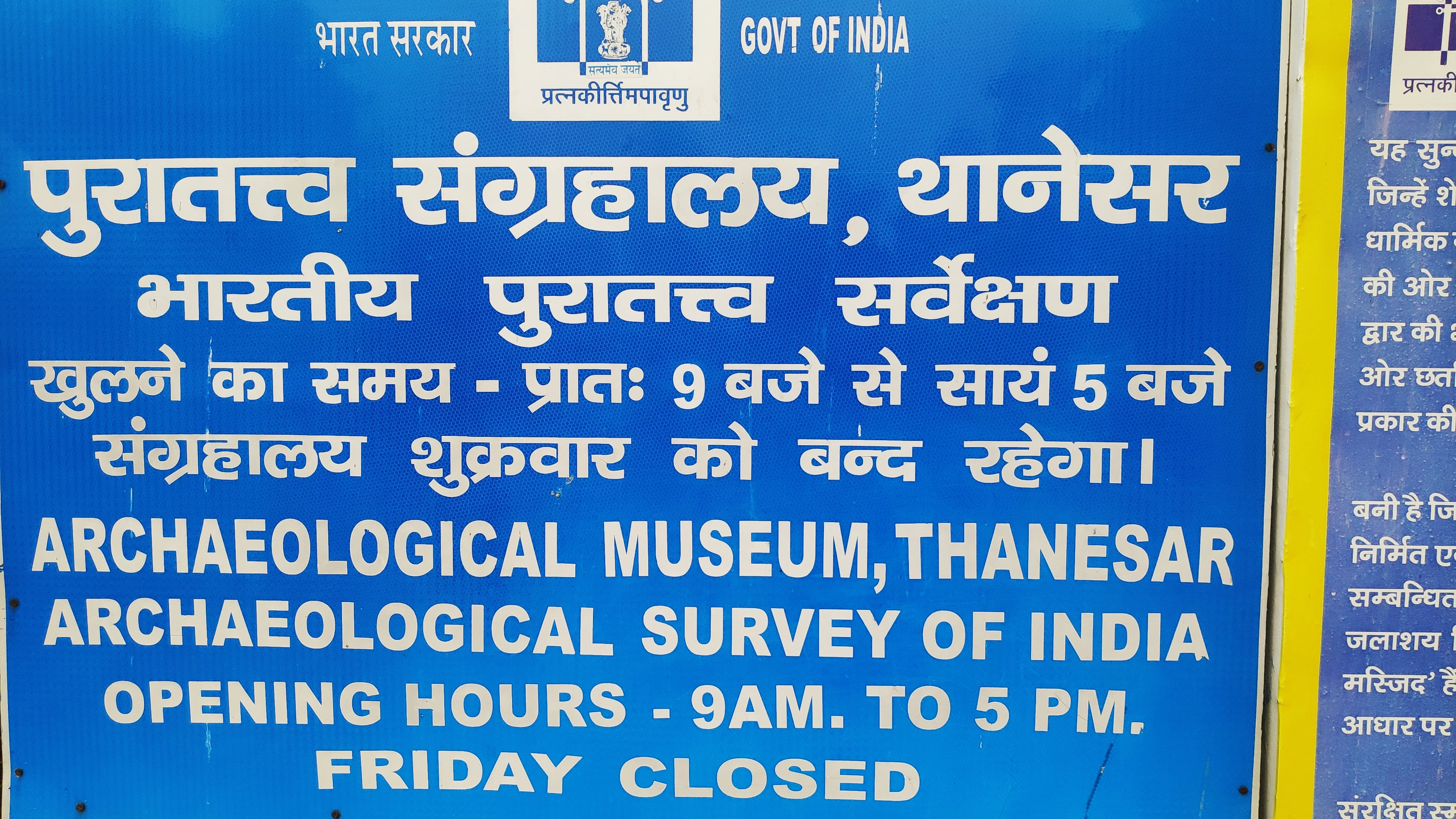

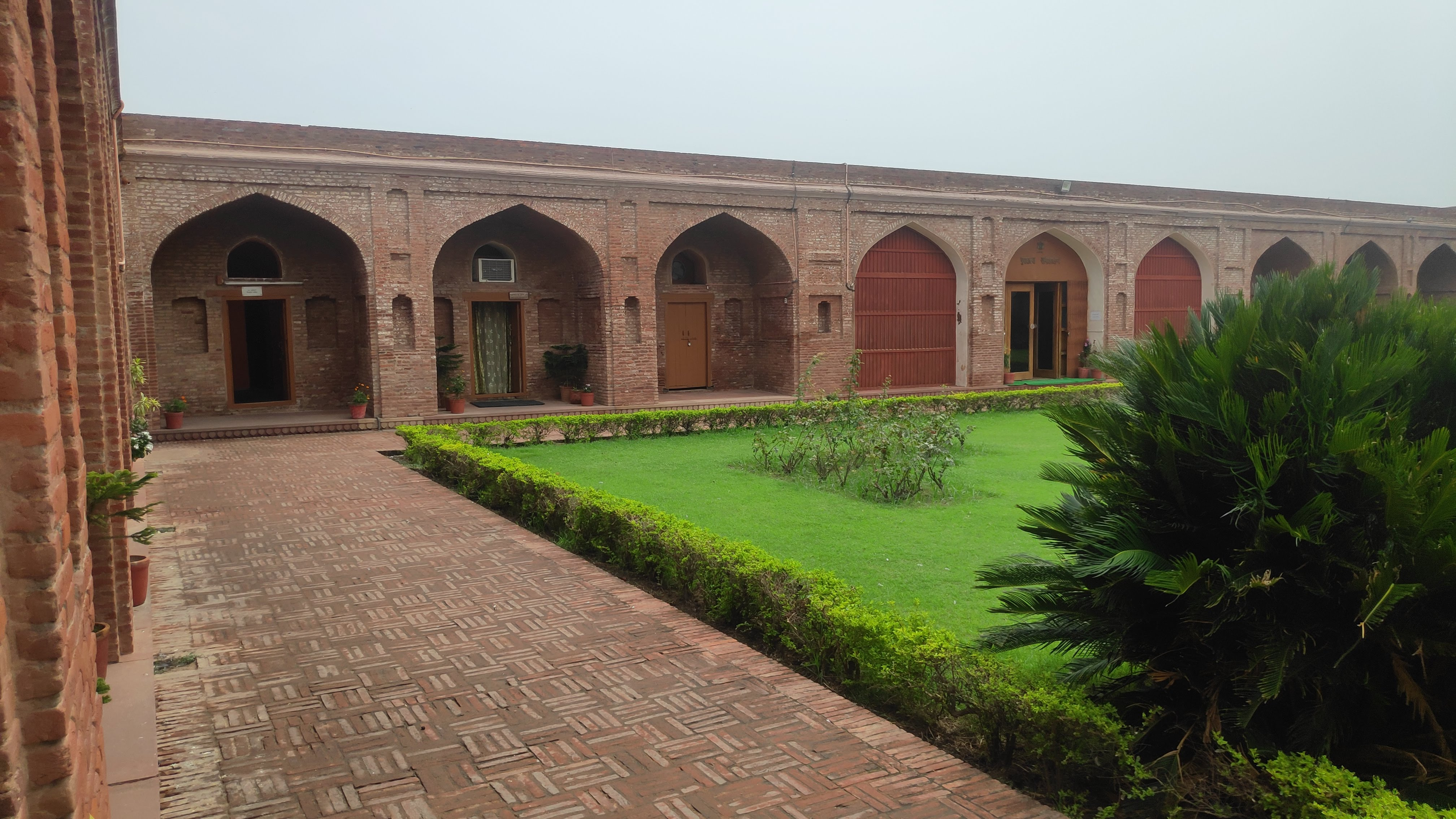

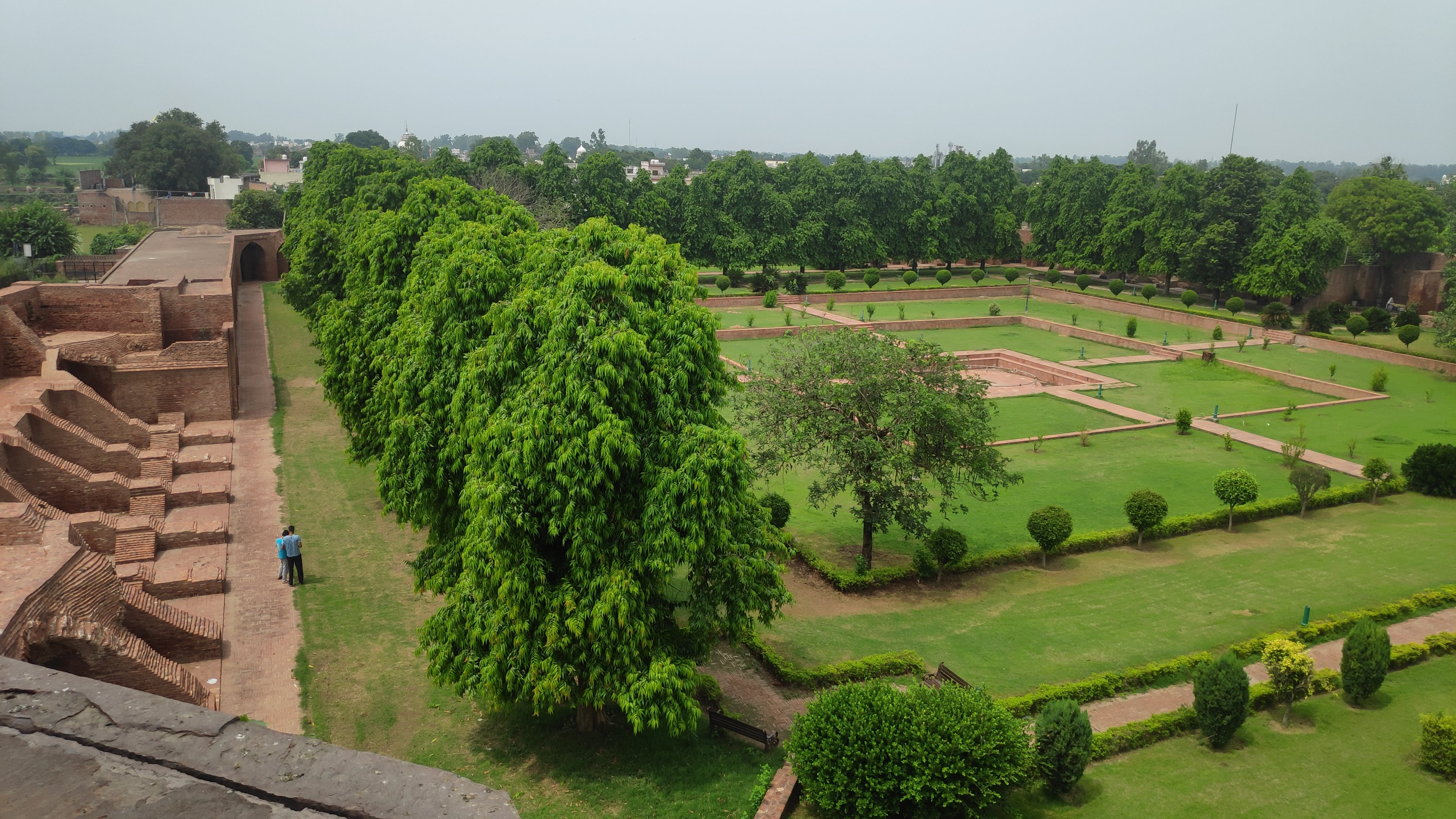

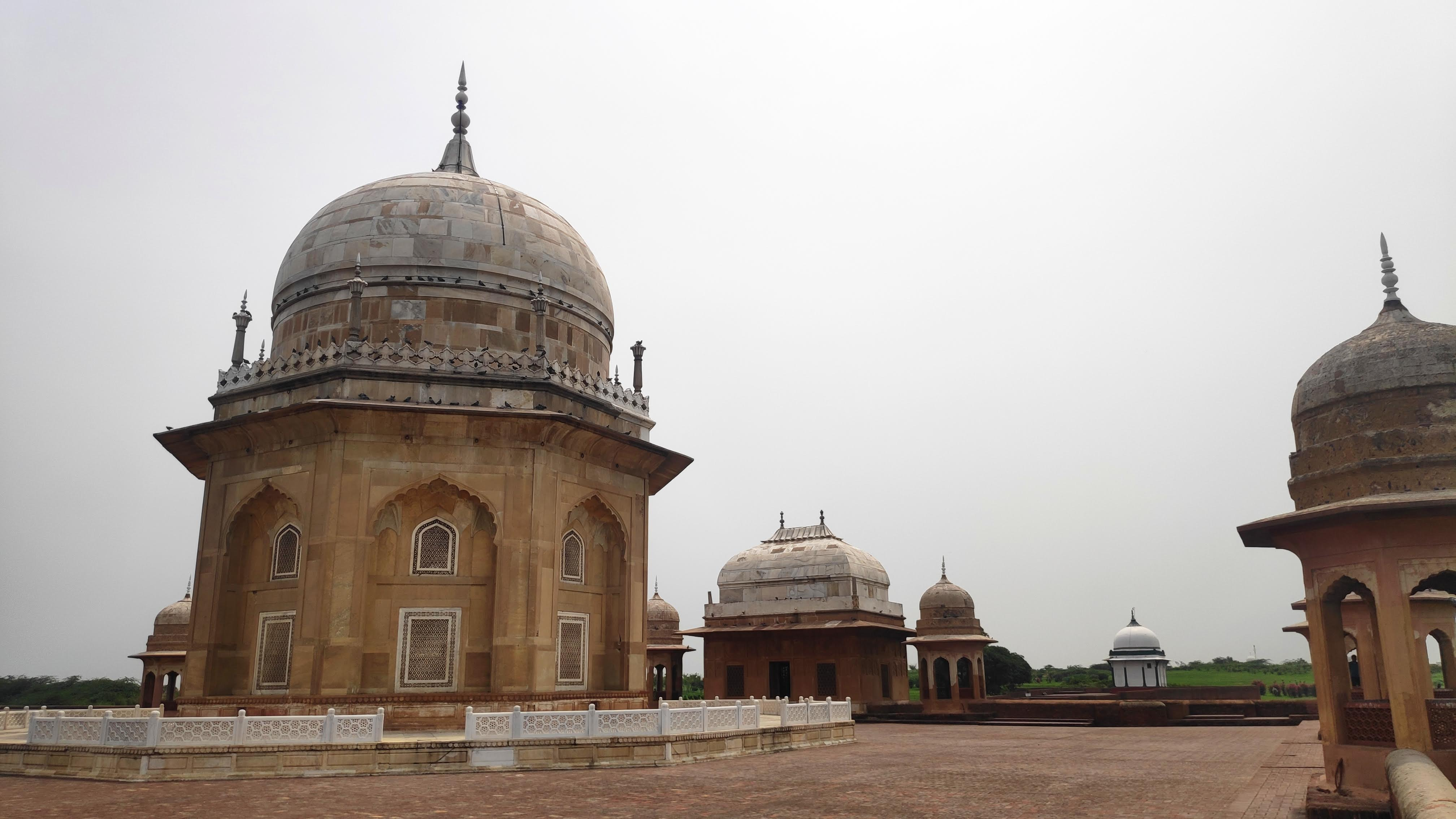

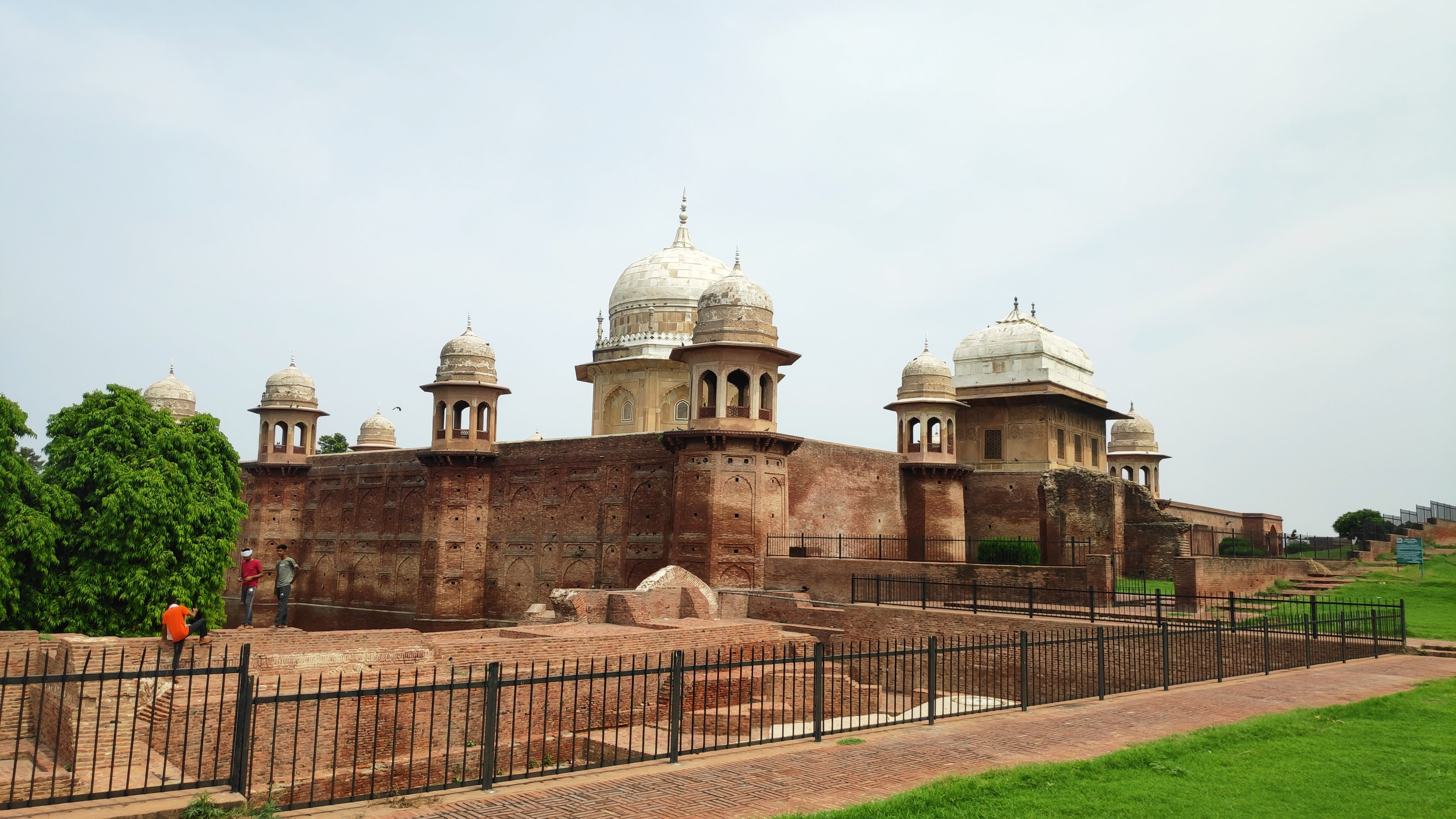

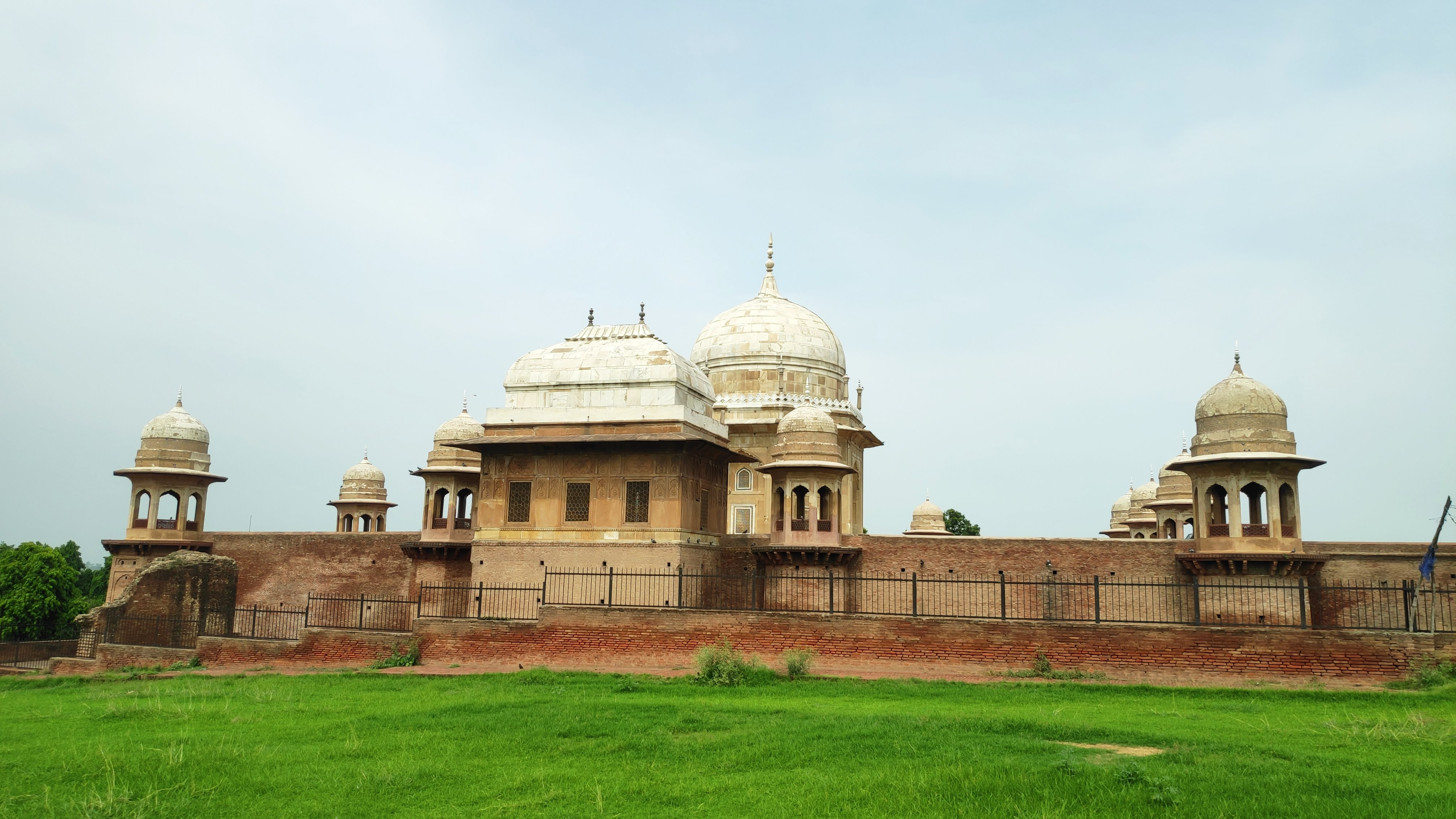

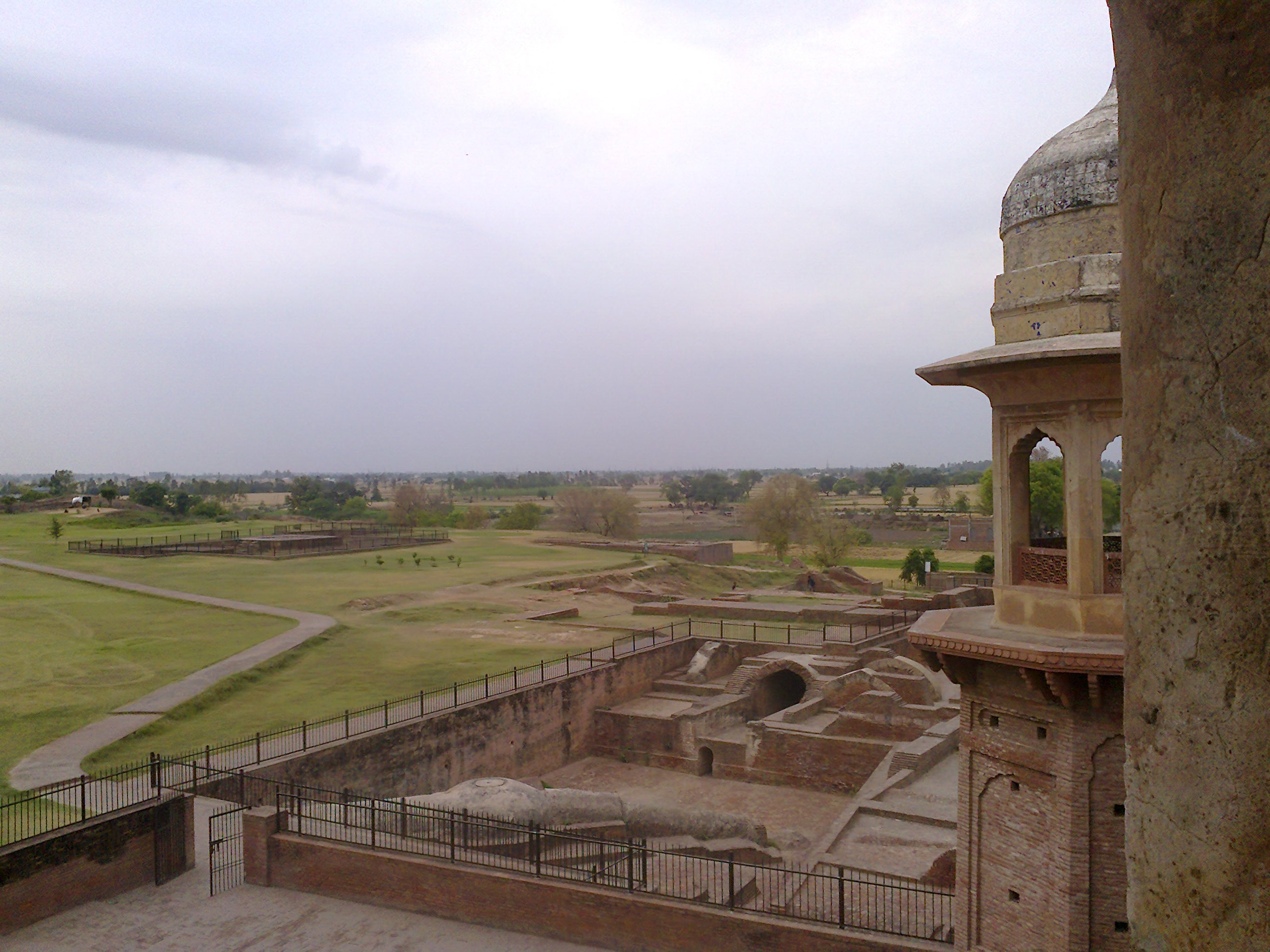

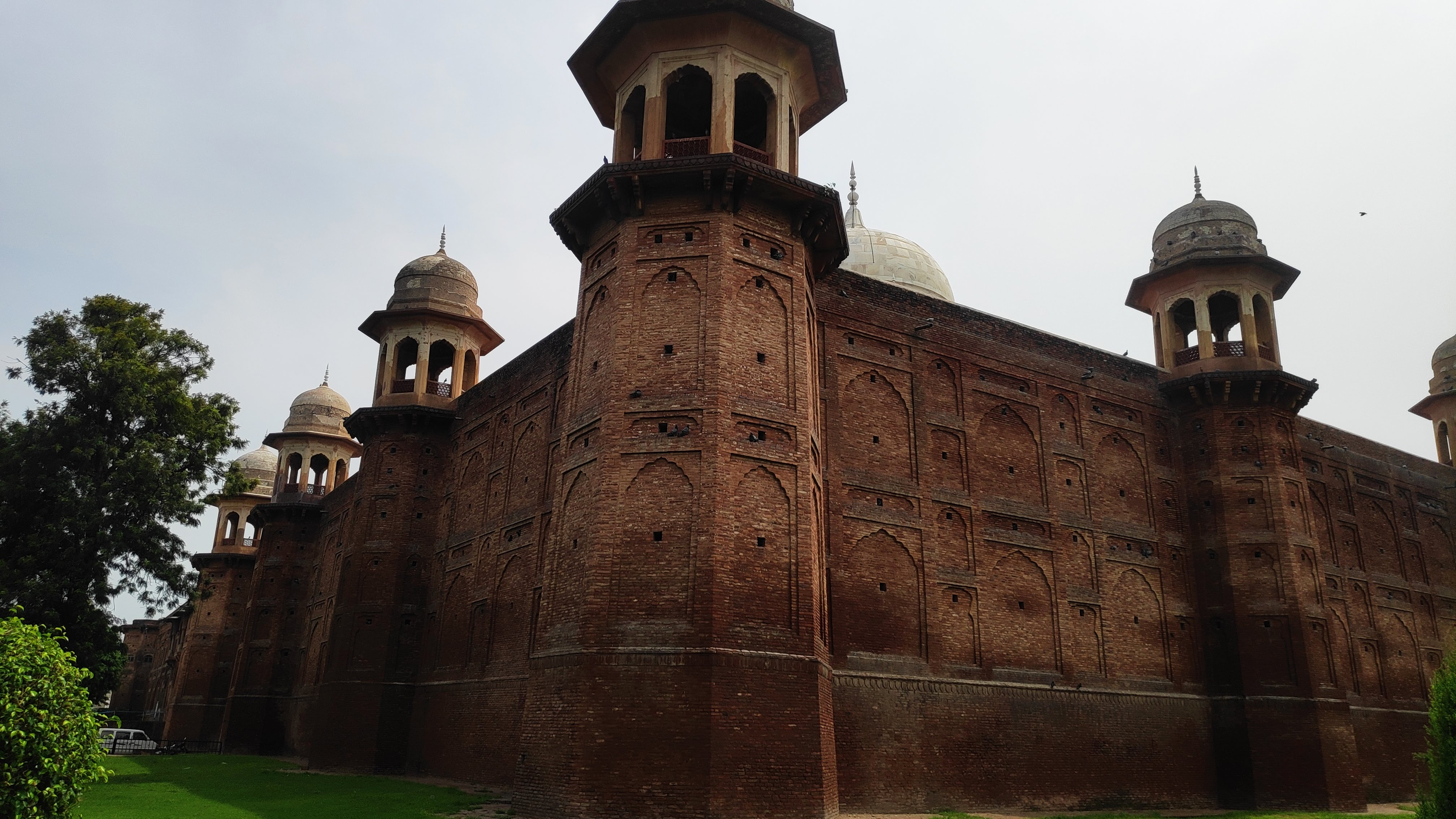

== Archaeological Museum ==
An Archaeological Museum run by Archaeological Survey of India, is also situated within the complex. The monument was protected and declared as of National importance under section 4 of the Ancient Monument and Archaeological Sites and Remains Act 1958; Vide No. 8516, dated 27-03-1919. It consists of archaeological finds, like seals and sealings, terracotta figurines, plaques, ornaments, and swords from sites in nearby regions of Kurukshetra and Bhagwanpura. These objects are notably from Kushana (1st -3rd century CE), Gupta period(4th - 6th CE), and from post Gupta period on Vardhana dynasty period (6th -7th CE).

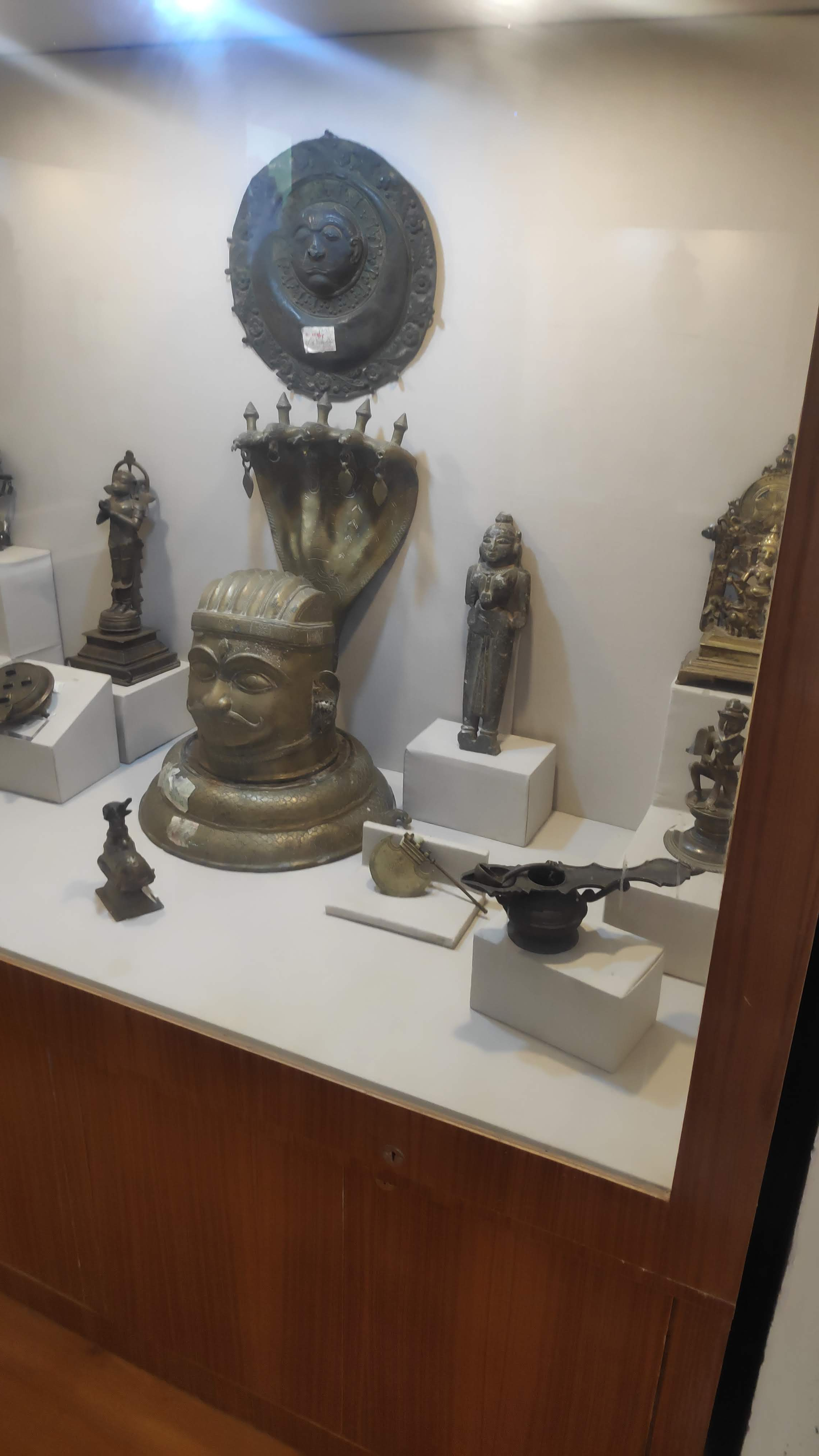

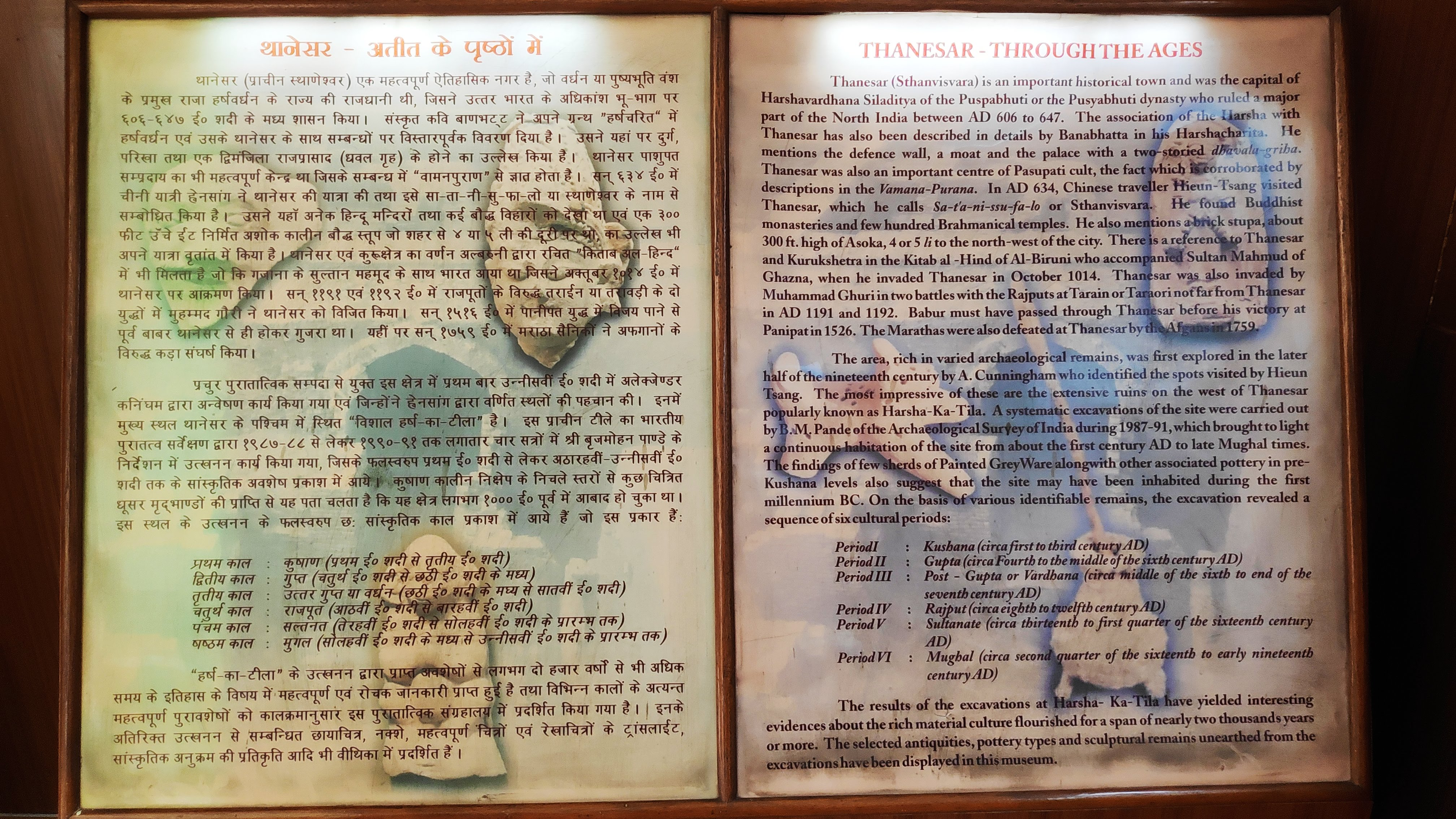

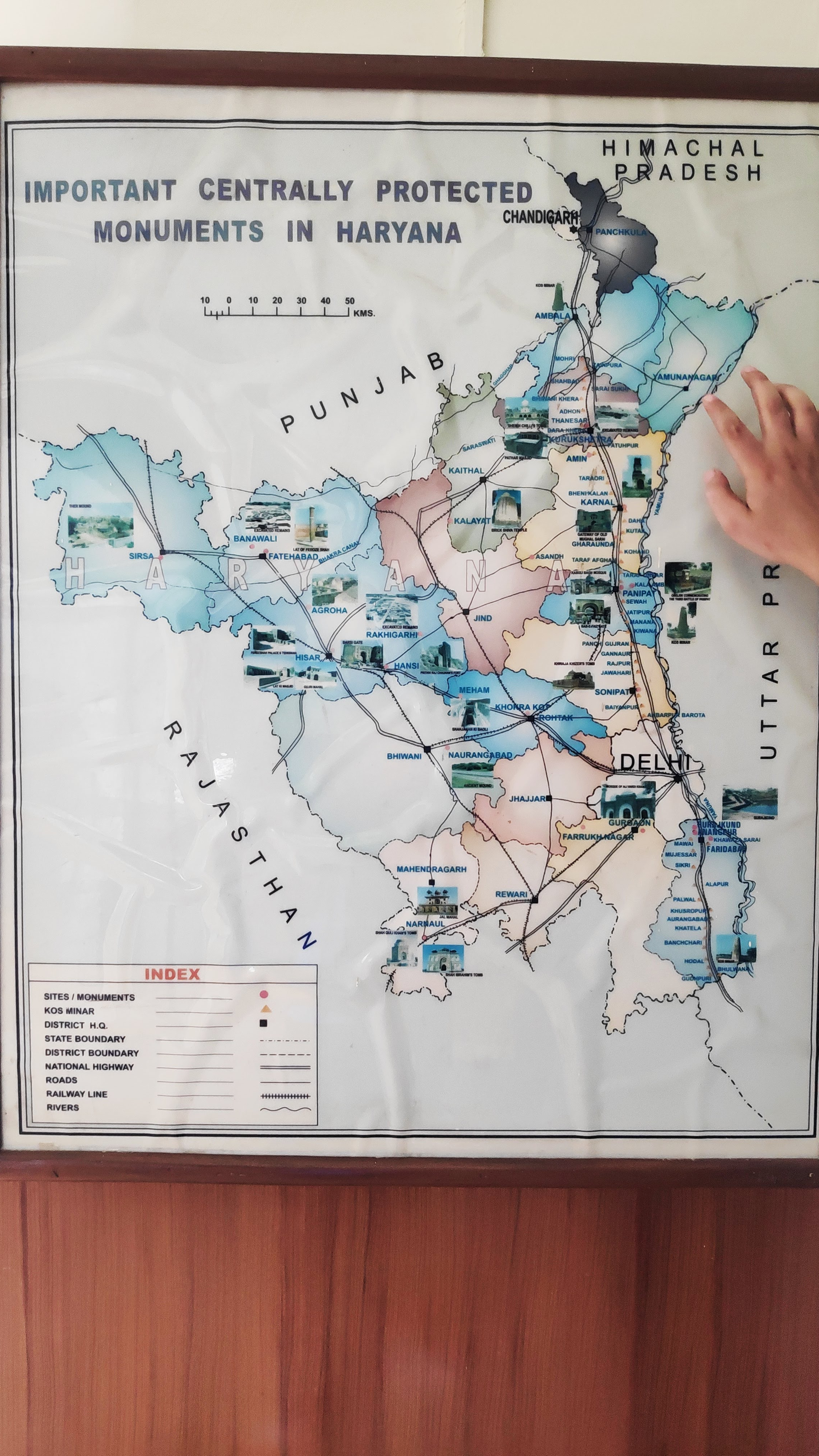

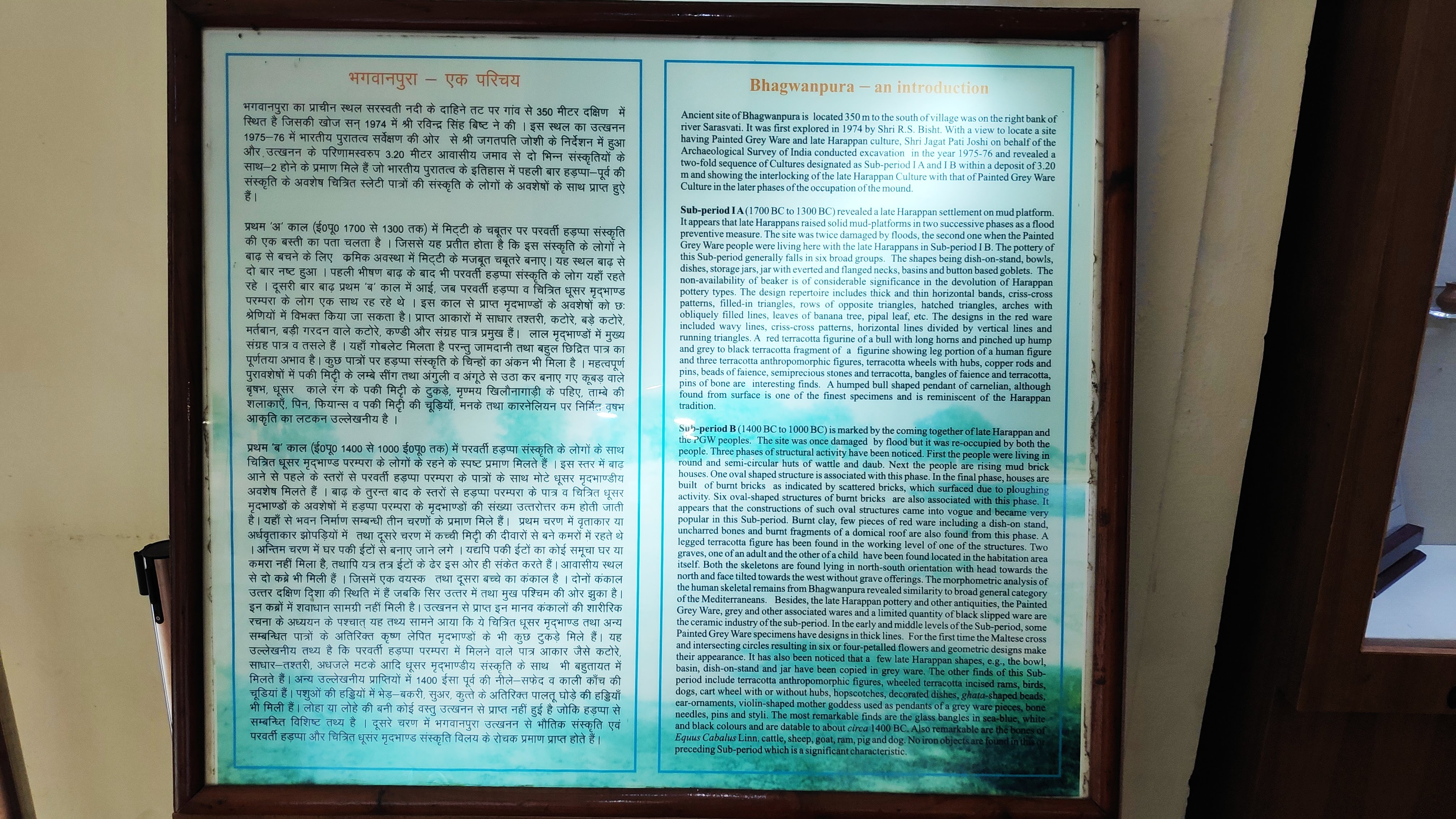

== See also ==
- List of Museums in Haryana
- Dara Shikoh
- Khwaja Khizr Tomb
- Qadiriyya
- Dharohar Museum at Kurukshetra University
- Kurukshetra Panorama and Science Centre at Kurukshetra
