= Ateli Assembly constituency =

Constituency of the Haryana legislative assembly in India

Coordinates: 28.102°N 76.255°E

- Constituency No. 68 for the Haryana Legislative Assembly

Constituency details
- Country: India
- Region: North India
- State: Haryana
- District: Mahendragarh
- Lok Sabha constituency: Bhiwani–Mahendragarh
- Established: 1968
- Total electors: 2,06,475
- Reservation: None

Member of Legislative Assembly
- 15th Haryana Legislative Assembly
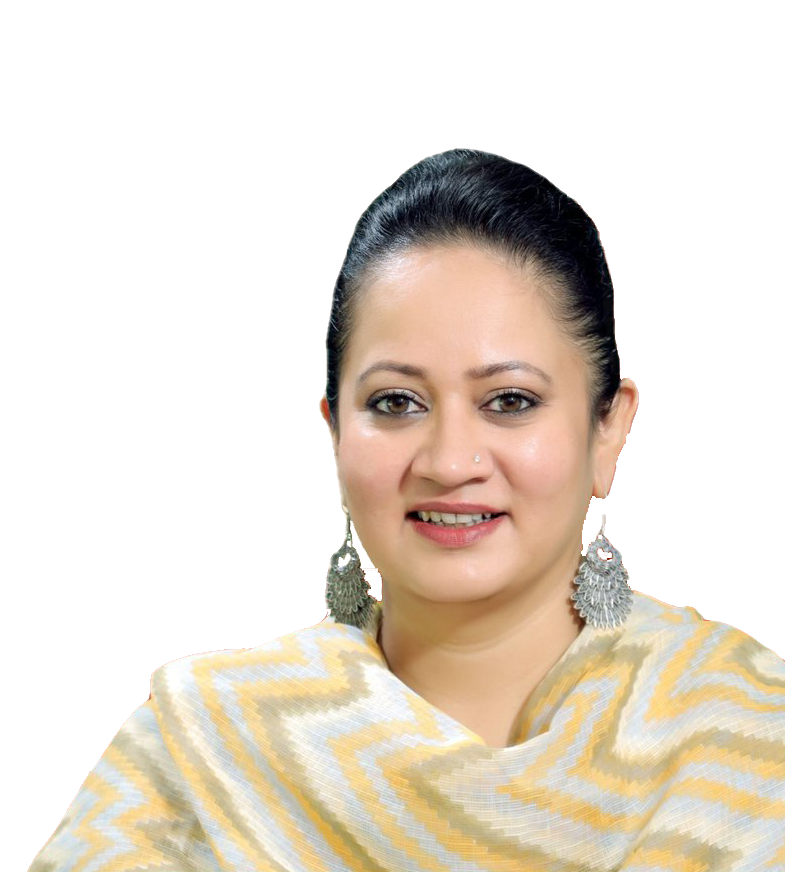
- Incumbent Arti Singh Rao
- Party: BJP
- Elected year: 2024

Ateli Assembly constituency is one of the 90 constituencies in the Haryana Legislative Assembly of Haryana, a state in northwest India. Ateli is also part of Bhiwani-Mahendragarh Lok Sabha constituency.

== Members of Legislative Assembly ==
Year	Member	Party
1967	N. Singh	Indian National Congress
1968	Rao Birender Singh	Vishal Haryana Party
1972	Banshi Singh	Vishal Haryana Party
1977	Rao Birender Singh	Vishal Haryana Party
1980^	Rao Birender Singh	Indian National Congress (I)
1982	Nihal Singh	Independent
1987	Laxmi Narain	Lok Dal
1991	Banshi Singh	Indian National Congress
1996	Narender Singh	Indian National Congress
2000	Narender Singh	Indian National Congress
2005	Naresh Yadav	Independent
2009	Anita Yadav	Indian National Congress
2014	Santosh Yadav	Bharatiya Janata Party
2019	Sitaram Yadav	Bharatiya Janata Party
2024	Arti Singh Rao	Bharatiya Janata Party

== Election results ==
=== Assembly Election 2024 ===
2024 Haryana Legislative Assembly election: Ateli
Party	Candidate	Votes	%	±%
BJP	Arti Singh Rao	57,737	39.75%	▼4.21
BSP	Attar Lal	54,652	37.63%	▲8.17
INC	Anita Yadav	30,037	20.68%	▲13.40
JJP	Aayushi Abhimanyu Rao	1,748	1.20%	▼9.19
NOTA	None of the Above	418	0.29%	▼0.14
Margin of victory		3,085	2.12%	▼12.38
Turnout		1,45,240	71.55%	▲4.81
Registered electors		2,06,475		▲6.76
BJP hold		Swing	▼4.21	

=== Assembly Election 2019 ===
2019 Haryana Legislative Assembly election: Ateli
Party	Candidate	Votes	%	±%
BJP	Sitaram	55,793	43.97%	▼5.72
BSP	Atar Lal	37,387	29.46%	▲24.25
JJP	Samrat	13,191	10.39%	New
INC	Arjun Singh	9,238	7.28%	▲1.34
Independent	Naresh Yadav Ateli	4,278	3.37%	New
Independent	Ajay Yadav	2,345	1.85%	New
SUCI(C)	Master Sube Singh	1,102	0.87%	New
Swaraj India	Sandeep Yadav	956	0.75%	New
INLD	Neetu Yadav	666	0.52%	▼11.82
Margin of victory		18,406	14.50%	▼22.85
Turnout		1,26,900	66.74%	▼9.80
Registered electors		1,90,134		▲11.84
BJP hold		Swing	▼5.72	

=== Assembly Election 2014 ===
2014 Haryana Legislative Assembly election: Ateli
Party	Candidate	Votes	%	±%
BJP	Santosh Yadav	64,659	49.69%	▲28.17
INLD	Satbir	16,058	12.34%	▼8.50
Independent	Ravi Chauhan	11,361	8.73%	New
Independent	Pardeep Kumar	8,556	6.58%	New
INC	Anita Yadav	7,727	5.94%	▼16.49
BSP	Sunita Verma	6,779	5.21%	▲3.79
Independent	Attar Lal	4,497	3.46%	New
HJC(BL)	Naresh Yadav Ateli	3,922	3.01%	▼4.59
Independent	Advocate Deepak Yadav	3,581	2.75%	New
Independent	Pradeep	711	0.55%	New
Margin of victory		48,601	37.35%	▲36.44
Turnout		1,30,123	76.54%	▲4.95
Registered electors		1,70,006		▲13.25
BJP gain from INC		Swing	▲27.26	

=== Assembly Election 2009 ===
2009 Haryana Legislative Assembly election: Ateli
Party	Candidate	Votes	%	±%
INC	Anita Yadav	24,103	22.43%	▼13.27
BJP	Santosh Yadav	23,130	21.52%	▲15.03
INLD	Rao Ajit Singh	22,400	20.84%	▲6.26
Independent	Naresh Yadav Ateli	10,535	9.80%	New
Independent	Jasmer Singh	8,578	7.98%	New
HJC(BL)	Roshan Lal	8,168	7.60%	New
Independent	Bali Ram Alias Billu	5,218	4.86%	New
BSP	Chandra Singh	1,525	1.42%	▲0.74
Independent	Jitender Pal	882	0.82%	New
Independent	Sumer Singh	583	0.54%	New
Margin of victory		973	0.91%	▼1.70
Turnout		1,07,466	71.59%	▼2.38
Registered electors		1,50,113		▼1.97
INC gain from Independent		Swing	▼15.88	

=== Assembly Election 2005 ===
2005 Haryana Legislative Assembly election: Ateli
Party	Candidate	Votes	%	±%
Independent	Naresh Yadav Ateli	43,396	38.31%	New
INC	Narender Singh	40,440	35.70%	▲1.11
INLD	Santosh Yadav	16,515	14.58%	▼19.65
BJP	Kailash Chand	7,351	6.49%	New
Independent	Sanyogita	860	0.76%	New
BSP	Ved Parkash	772	0.68%	▼5.66
Independent	Harbans Lal	751	0.66%	New
Independent	Sabha Ram	714	0.63%	New
Margin of victory		2,956	2.61%	▲2.25
Turnout		1,13,275	73.97%	▲5.30
Registered electors		1,53,131		▲14.56
Independent gain from INC		Swing	▲3.72	

=== Assembly Election 2000 ===
2000 Haryana Legislative Assembly election: Ateli
Party	Candidate	Votes	%	±%
INC	Narender Singh	31,755	34.59%	▲8.46
INLD	Santosh D/O Bhagwan Singh	31,421	34.23%	New
Independent	Naresh Yadav Ateli	19,855	21.63%	New
BSP	Rao Om Prakash Engineer	5,819	6.34%	▼5.30
SP	Laxminarain	785	0.86%	▼17.69
HVP	J. D. Yadav	500	0.54%	▼22.23
Independent	Comrade Balbir Singh	476	0.52%	New
Margin of victory		334	0.36%	▼3.00
Turnout		91,792	69.47%	▲4.80
Registered electors		1,33,670		▲0.92
INC hold		Swing	▲8.46	

=== Assembly Election 1996 ===
1996 Haryana Legislative Assembly election: Ateli
Party	Candidate	Votes	%	±%
INC	Narender Singh	22,114	26.14%	▼3.47
HVP	Rao Omprakash Engineer S/O Nand Lal	19,270	22.78%	▲0.98
SP	Ajit Singh	15,686	18.54%	New
BSP	Naresh Yadav Ateli	9,846	11.64%	New
SAP	Nihal Singh	7,534	8.91%	New
Independent	Bharat Singh	3,328	3.93%	New
Independent	J. S. Yadav	1,192	1.41%	New
JD	Raj Kumar Yadav	671	0.79%	New
Rashtriya Kisan Party	Devender Kumar Lamba	536	0.63%	New
Independent	Naval Singh S/O Bir Singh	486	0.57%	New
Margin of victory		2,844	3.36%	▲3.26
Turnout		84,600	66.50%	▲8.68
Registered electors		1,32,454		▲11.91
INC hold		Swing	▼3.47	

=== Assembly Election 1991 ===
1991 Haryana Legislative Assembly election: Ateli
Party	Candidate	Votes	%	±%
INC	Bamshi Singh	19,343	29.61%	▼16.07
JP	Ajit Singh	19,277	29.51%	New
HVP	Nihal Singh	14,240	21.80%	New
BJP	Laxminarain	4,449	6.81%	New
Independent	Amar Singh	3,190	4.88%	New
Doordarshi Party	Ram Kishan	706	1.08%	New
Independent	Nagar Mal	672	1.03%	New
Independent	Om Parkash	437	0.67%	New
Independent	Panna Lal	391	0.60%	New
VHP	Usha	378	0.58%	▼0.14
Independent	Ravinder Kumar	331	0.51%	New
Margin of victory		66	0.10%	▼3.48
Turnout		65,319	57.77%	▼11.11
Registered electors		1,18,354		▲9.15
INC gain from LKD		Swing	▼19.65	

=== Assembly Election 1987 ===
1987 Haryana Legislative Assembly election: Ateli
Party	Candidate	Votes	%	±%
LKD	Laxminarain	35,417	49.26%	▲48.00
INC	Kheta Nath	32,842	45.68%	▼1.15
Independent	Panna Lal	1,980	2.75%	New
VHP	Kuldeep	520	0.72%	New
Margin of victory		2,575	3.58%	▲3.25
Turnout		71,891	67.48%	▲4.23
Registered electors		1,08,428		▲16.28
LKD gain from Independent		Swing	▲2.10	

=== Assembly Election 1982 ===
1982 Haryana Legislative Assembly election: Ateli
Party	Candidate	Votes	%	±%
Independent	Nihal Singh	27,298	47.16%	New
INC	Bansi Singh	27,105	46.83%	New
Independent	Suman	884	1.53%	New
Independent	Ramji Lal	810	1.40%	New
LKD	Mool Chand	733	1.27%	New
Independent	Budh Ram	470	0.81%	New
Margin of victory		193	0.33%	
Turnout		57,881	63.48%	
Registered electors		93,246		
Independent win (new seat)				

=== Assembly By-election 1980 ===
1980 Haryana Legislative Assembly by-election: Ateli
Party	Candidate	Votes	%	±%
	B.Singh	35,243		New
	L.Narain	7,575		New
JP	R. Singh	6,610		
BJP	Murlindhar	2,353		New
Independent	M. Shyam	891		New
Margin of victory		27,668		
win (new seat)				

=== Assembly Election 1977 ===
1977 Haryana Legislative Assembly election: Ateli
Party	Candidate	Votes	%	±%
VHP	Birender Singh	29,552	56.83%	▲14.19
JP	Laxman Singh	17,053	32.79%	New
INC	Kanwar Singh	2,973	5.72%	▼25.44
Independent	Mohan Lal	1,372	2.64%	New
Independent	Harbans Lal	396	0.76%	New
Independent	Shri Krishan	364	0.70%	New
Independent	Laxmi Chand	295	0.57%	New
Margin of victory		12,499	24.03%	▲12.55
Turnout		52,005	68.22%	▲5.69
Registered electors		77,524		▲17.89
VHP hold		Swing	▲14.19	

=== Assembly Election 1972 ===
1972 Haryana Legislative Assembly election: Ateli
Party	Candidate	Votes	%	±%
VHP	Banshi Singh	17,214	42.64%	▼16.45
INC	Nari Der Singh	12,578	31.16%	▼8.62
Independent	Onkar Singh	9,070	22.47%	New
Independent	Shri Ram	1,510	3.74%	New
Margin of victory		4,636	11.48%	▼7.83
Turnout		40,372	63.06%	▼6.43
Registered electors		65,760		▲11.32
VHP hold		Swing	▼16.45	

=== Assembly Election 1968 ===
1968 Haryana Legislative Assembly election: Ateli
Party	Candidate	Votes	%	±%
VHP	Birender Singh	23,673	59.09%	New
INC	Nihal Singh	15,937	39.78%	▼9
Independent	Mandhar	455	1.14%	New
Margin of victory		7,736	19.31%	▲16.63
Turnout		40,065	69.90%	▲3.93
Registered electors		59,071		▲4.56
VHP gain from INC		Swing		

=== Assembly Election 1967 ===
1967 Haryana Legislative Assembly election: Ateli
Party	Candidate	Votes	%	±%
INC	N. Singh	17,607	48.78%	New
Independent	R. Jiwan	16,640	46.10%	New
Independent	Parshada	1,851	5.13%	New
Margin of victory		967	2.68%	
Turnout		36,098	67.03%	
Registered electors		56,497		
INC win (new seat)				

== See also ==
- Ateli
- Mahendragarh district
- List of constituencies of Haryana Legislative Assembly
