= Deroli Jat =

- Location within Haryana Location within India
- Coordinates: 28.17°N 76.15°E
- Country: India
- State: Haryana
- District: Mahendragarh

Government
  - Body: Jat Village panchayat

Area
  - Total: 3 km^{2} (1.2 sq mi)
- Elevation: 282 m (925 ft)

Population (2011)
  - Total: 3,219
- Time zone: UTC+5:30 (IST)
- PIN: 123028
- Sex ratio: 920 ♂/♀
- Website: www.mahendragarh.gov.in

Deroli Jat is one of the largest Jat villages in Mahendragarh district, Haryana, India.

== History ==
Deroli Jat is a Jat village in Mahendra Garh Block of Mahendragarh district in Haryana. It is a distant village in rural region of Mahendragarh district of Haryana, it is one of the 89 Jat villages of Mahendra Garh Block of Mahendragarh district.

== Geography ==
Deroli Jat is located at 28.17°N 76.15°E. It has an average elevation of 237 metres (830 feet). The village in the Eolian plain area and is surrounded by small hills.

EC Value in Micro Mhos/Cm is above 6000.

== Demographics ==
Religion in Deroli Jat (2011)
Religion	Percent
Hinduism Jats	91.21%
Hinduism Other	8.03%
Islam	0.41%
Other or not stated	0.35%

=== Languages ===
Languages of Deroli Jat (2011)
1. Haryanvi (80.4%)
2. Rajasthani mainly Bagri (10.2%)
3. Hindi (8.75%)
4. Others (0.65%)

The local Rajasthani language dialect is Bagri in Deroli Jat. At the 2011 Census, the majority of the population identified their first language as either 80.42% Haryanvi, 10.18% Rajasthani and 8.75% Hindi.

== Administration ==
As per the administration register, the village number of Deroli Jat is 62049.

== Amenities ==
For the health and nutrition of women and their infants till the age of 6 Integrated Child Development Services and Anganwadi serves the purpose. Accredited Social Health Activist also help in monitoring the health of women and infants of the village.

== Transport ==
=== Road ===
National Highway 17 is the nearest National highway passing through Nangal Sirohi. Another National highway No. 26 is also the nearest National highway passing through Narnaul. A state highway No. 127 is the nearest state highway passing through Seehma ending at Narnaul- Mahendrgarh Road i.e. NH No. 17. Village is thus connected by Nangal Sirohi-Deroli Jat road. It is also connectivity by Bus by Seehma-Deroli-Kuksi Road which leads to Dhaula Kuan, Delhi via Ateli & Rewari.

=== Railway ===
Ateli railway station in Ateli having Station Code AEL is the nearest Railway Station which is 16.7 km, which is located along the Rewari-Narnaul route.

== Employment and education ==
- Gourav Puniya Singh Deroli Jat School located in Deroli Jat, Khatiwas, is one of the Co-Educational institutions managed by Department of Education. This school serves the purpose of providing Primary and secondary education only.
- Chaudhary Charan Singh school in Deroli Jat.
- Chaudhary Satyapal Singh Major public school in Deroli Jat, is also one of the co-educational institution managed by Department of Education.

== Sanatan Dharm Religion ==
- Mahadev temple is 200 years old temple in Deroli Jat.
- Baba Nand Ram Das Mandir is 100 years old temple for worship.
- Shiv Mandir is the oldest temple for worship. Shiv Mandir is more than 700 years old temple in Deroli Jat village.
- Hanuman Mandir is more than 180 years old temple in Deroli Jat.
