= Maharani Konar =

Indian politician (1933–2024)

Member of the West Bengal Legislative Assembly
- In office 1982–1996
- Preceded by: Benoy Krishna Konar
- Succeeded by: Tapas Chattopadhyay
- Constituency: Memari

Personal details
- Born: 23 November 1933 Bardhaman, Bardhaman district, Bengal Presidency, British India
- Died: 5 January 2024 (aged 90) Memari, Purba Bardhaman district, West Bengal, India
- Political party: Communist Party of India (Marxist) (1964–2024); Communist Party of India (1958–1964)
- Spouse: Benoy Krishna Konar
- Relatives: Hare Krishna Konar (brother-in-law)

Maharani Konar (23 November 1933 – 5 January 2024), popularly known as Rani Di, was an Indian communist leader and politician. In the 1990s, she became one of the principal leaders of the democratic women's movement in Bengal. Konar was one of the founding leaders of the All India Federation of Anganwadi Workers and Helpers and was the National Vice President of the ICDS workers union; she also served the West Bengal Legislative Assembly for 14 years.

== Early life ==
Maharani Konar was born into a Zamindar family on November 23, 1933, in the Bardhaman district of the Bengal Presidency in British India. Konar joined the Communist Party of India in 1958. Later, after the 1964 split in the Communist Party of India, she quit the party and eventually joined the Communist Party of India (Marxist).

== Political career ==
She was part of a heroic peasant's struggle in Bardhaman district, organized by the All India Kisan Sabha, against the feudal landlords and Zamindars of Bardhaman district. Following that, she became actively involved in the trade union movement under the banner of the Centre of Indian Trade Unions. and eventually played a major role in organizing Anganwadi workers and helpers of the whole India. Then she founded the union of the Integrated Child Development Services workers, the All India Federation of Anganwadi Workers and Helpers. She became the National Vice President as well as the West Bengal State Vice President of the organization. After that, she joined the mainstream movement of the Centre of Indian Trade Unions and got elected to the Centre of Indian Trade Unions West Bengal state committee.

She was also a member of the West Bengal Legislative Assembly for a long 14 years from 1982 to 1996 elected from the Memari Assembly constituency. During the left-front rule, she became one of the excellent legislators in the 1980s and was involved in various legislative committees and government bodies.

== Electoral history ==
Election of 1982–1991
Election Year	Office Held	Constituency	Party affiliation	Result
1982	Member of the Legislative Assembly	Memari	Communist Party of India (Marxist)	Won
1987	Member of the Legislative Assembly	Memari	Communist Party of India (Marxist)	Won
1991	Member of the Legislative Assembly	Memari	Communist Party of India (Marxist)	Won

== Later life and death ==
=== Later life ===
Maharani Konar was a regular attendee at all left and Brigade meetings. In the Memari Municipal Election on February 27, 2022, Maharani Konar was 88 years old, but she campaigned for the Communist Party of India (Marxist) candidate in various wards. Konar also campaigned for the 2024 general election in the year 2023.

=== Death ===
After a prolonged illness at the age of 90, Maharani Konar died at 1:52 p.m. (IST) on Friday, January 5, 2024, at her residence in Memari, Purba Bardhaman district, West Bengal. Konar donated her body for the advancement of medical research. As a result, her body was handed over to the Burdwan Medical College administration without following any kind of Indian rituals of the Hindu religion.

== Personal life ==
Maharani was married to Benoy Krishna Konar, a communist politician and a firebrand peasant leader. Maharani Konar was also the sister-in-law of legendary Marxist revolutionary and agricultural theorist Hare Krishna Konar.
