= Nand Ghar =

Indian not-for-profit organization

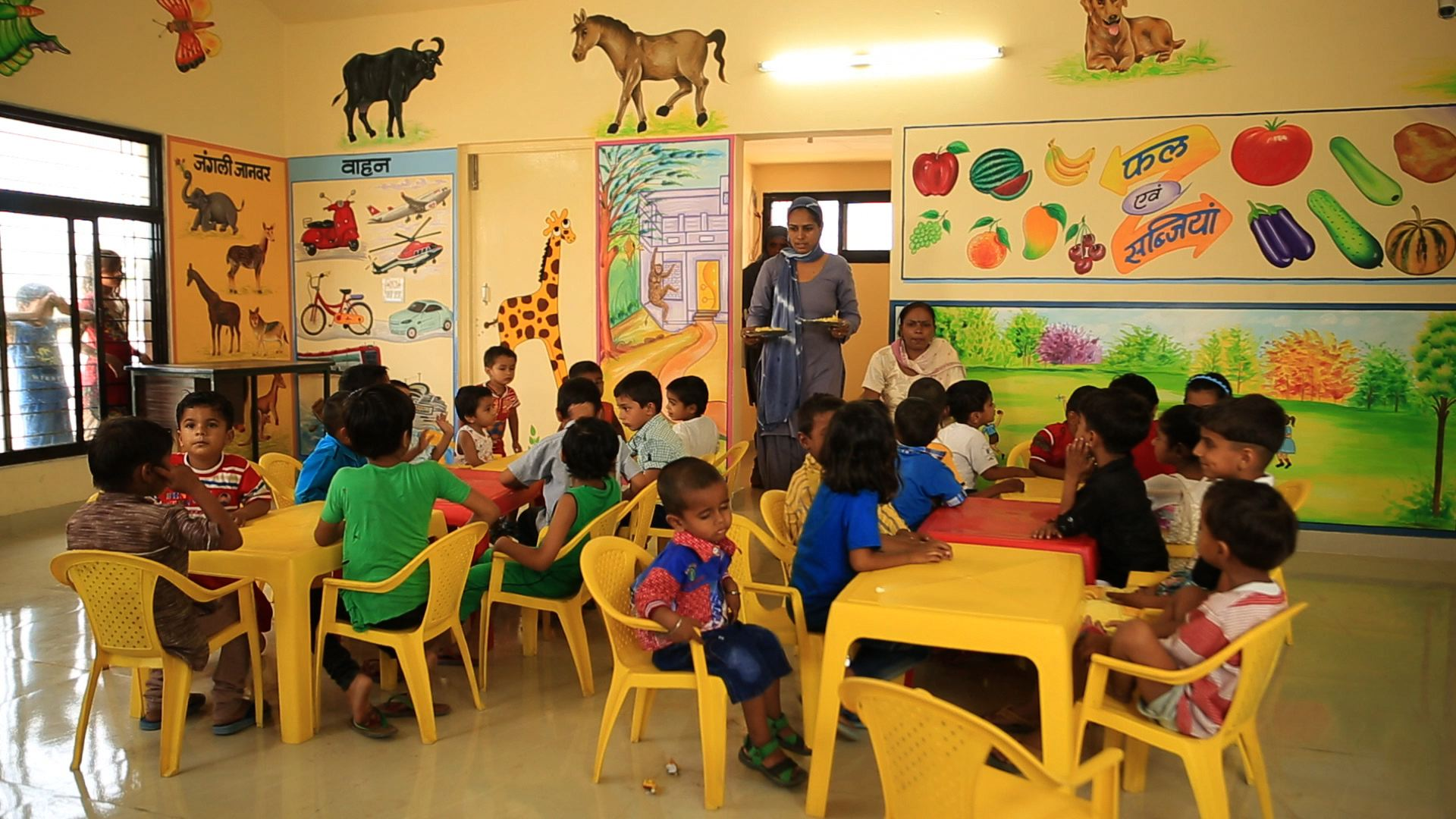
- Nandghar
- Formation: 2015
- Type: Nonprofit organization
- Headquarters: New Delhi
- Location: India
- Key people: Anil Agarwal (Founder and Chairman, Vedanta Resources Limited); Priya Agarwal Hebbar (Non-Executive Director, Vedanta Limited and Chairperson, Hindustan Zinc Limited); Shashi Arora (CEO, Nand Ghar)
- Parent organization: Anil Agarwal Foundation
- Website: nandghar.org

Nand Ghar is the flagship project of the Anil Agarwal Foundation, the philanthropic arm of the Vedanta Group. The project provides infrastructure facilities along with early childhood education, healthcare, nutrition, and skill development for women with the goal of empowering 7 crore children and 2 crore women over 13.7 lakh Anganwadi centers in India. Under its Integrated Child Development Services (ICDS), the Ministry of Women and Child Development and Vedanta are working together on the Nand Ghar project. In April 2016, the first Nand Ghar was founded in Varanasi's Nagepur district. As of 2025, about 10,000 centres of Nand Ghar are operating in 16 states.

== History ==
Commencing on October 2, 1975, the Integrated Child Development Services (ICDS) Scheme is one of the largest community-based programs globally. The ICDS provides services to adolescent girls, expectant and nursing mothers, and children up to the age of six. Its goals are to provide the groundwork for the comprehensive, psychological, physical, and social development of children aged 0 to 6 as well as to improve their nutritional and health condition. Through nutrition and health education, it seeks to improve the mother's ability to provide for her child's fundamental medical and nutritional needs.

== Partnership ==
In order to renovate Nand Ghars in 11 Indian states, Vedanta and the Ministry of Women and Child Development inked an agreement in 2015 after the Nand Ghar model was successfully demonstrated. Vedanta has inked further Memorandums of Understanding (MoUs) with state governments to expand Nand Ghars into other regions within the alliance. In order to assist in the renovation of 500 Nand Ghars in the state of Uttar Pradesh, the Bill & Melinda Gates Foundation also partnered with Nand Ghar. In February 2022, Anil Agarwal Foundation and the Government of Rajasthan inked an MoU to build 25,000 Nand Ghars across the state. The Foundation then went on to sign many more with the Varanasi Administration in order to initiate a millet bar nutrition campaign and build Nand Ghars across the district. Nand Ghar has also launched the Global Volunteering Program, which welcomes both local and foreign volunteers. This program is the result of an agreement that Nand Ghar and Aii Group inked on 22 July 2022. Additionally, it has partnered with organisations like Tata Consulting Engineers, KPMG, Sesame Workshop India, etc. to support the implementation of its programs across its operational areas.

== Presence and scale ==
here are currently 12,000 operational Nand Ghar centres in 17 states. Now Vedanta has crossed the 10,000 Nand Ghar centres in 16 states as per 2025. Recently in Telangana, Hyderabad the Nand Ghar initiative was officially launched by Honourable Union Minister of Coal and Mines, G Kishan Reddy.

== Activities during Covid pandemic ==
In 2021, Nand Ghar launched a telemedicine model inaugurated by Smriti Zubin Irani, connecting rural communities with MBBS doctors and specialists, supported by mobile health vans for basic tests and medicines. During COVID-19, it enabled learning via WhatsApp and IVRS, reaching over 55,000 children, with content adopted across 62,000 anganwadis in Rajasthan. Nand Ghars were also used as vaccination centers and COVID care facilities, while supporting oxygen plants and mobilizing women to stitch 1.5 lakh masks for community protection. With these initiatives, Nand Ghar provided e-learning content to more than 55,000 children in rural areas. Nand Ghar’s e-content was adopted by the 62,000 Anganwadis in Rajasthan.

== Run For Zero Hunger Campaign ==
The Run For Zero Hunger Campaign conducted annually under the Anil Agarwal Foundation, is a nationwide movement aimed at ensuring zero hunger with its association through the Vedanta Delhi Half Marathon. For every kilometre run by a participant, it pledged to nourish a child at Nand Ghar and 7 million meals were raised over two years. Vedanta has also partnered with major events like the Delhi Half Marathon for its Run for zero hunger campaign. In 2025, this marathon was flagged off by Delhi CM Rekha Gupta and was won by Alex Matata of Kenya.

== Khaana Khaaya Kya Movement ==
KhaanaKhaayaKya Movement ‘Agar Bachpan Se Poocha Khaana Khaaya, Toh Desh Ka Kal Banaya’ is a part of the larger Nand Ghar movement aimed at achieving zero hunger and strengthening the Anganwadi ecosystem in India. The movement invites public participation through donation, volunteering and partnerships.

== Awards and recognition ==
Project Nand Ghar won a gold at the CSR Health Impact Awards 2020 organized by the Integrated Health and Wellbeing council to support the communities to combat the pandemic. Nand Ghar was awarded the CSR Project of the Year Award at the India CSR Summit 2021. It was also awarded the CSR Shining Star Award in the area of child development in 2021. Rajasthan Government recognised it as the Best Corporate Social Responsibility (CSR) effort under the 'Indira Mahila Shakti Protsahan Evam Samman Yojana'. In 2022 Nand Ghar was awarded SABERA Award in Innovative Development Sector Project.

== Verticals of Nand Ghar ==
- Education: Nand Ghar's aim is to enhance pre-primary education through interactive learning methods by utilizing Building as Learning Aid (BaLA) designs and pre-loaded content on TV and smart kits, as well as tablets.
- Health: Nand Ghar facilitates government vaccination programs for children and also extends health services through Mobile Health Vans and Telemedicine.
- Nutrition: Nand Ghar initiated a project that provided 72 lac multi-millet nutri bars (endorsed by ICMR-National Institute of Nutrition, India) to Nand Ghar and other Anganwadi children, aged 3 to 6 years on a daily basis in the Varanasi district.
- Women empowerment: Nand Ghars are utilized in the second half of the day to engage women beneficiaries, facilitating skill training and scheme linkage activities.
