= All India Federation of Anganwadi Workers and Helpers =

Trade union in India

- Founded: 6 January 1991
- Headquarters: BTR Bhawan, New Delhi
- Location: India
- Members: 500,000 (2015 claim)
- Key people: A.R. Sindhu, General Secretary
- Affiliations: Centre of Indian Trade Unions
- Website: aifawh.org

The All India Federation of Anganwadi Workers and Helpers (abbreviated AIFAWH) is a trade union for Anganwadi workers and helpers in India. AIFAWH opposes any privatization schemes for the Integrated Child Development Services. AIFAWH is affiliated to the Centre of Indian Trade Unions (CITU). As of 2015 A.R. Sindu was the general secretary of the union, and Neelima Maitra its president.

The union was founded at a conference in Udaipur, Rajasthan on 6 January 1991. K. Hemalata was the general secretary of the union between 1998 and 2012. As of 2015 AIFAWH claimed to have 500,000 members in 26 states.

== Affiliated unions ==
- Andhra Pradesh: Andhra Pradesh Anganwadi Workers and Helpers Union is the AIFAWH affiliate in Andhra Pradesh. As of 2014 P. Roja was the general secretary of the union.
- Assam: Assam Rajyik Anganwadi Karmi and Sahayika Santha is the AIFAWH affiliate in Assam. As of 2009 Indira Newar was the secretary of the union.
- Punjab: Anganwadi Mulazam Union Punjab is the AIFAWH affiliate in Punjab. As of 2009 Usha Rani was the president of the union.
