= Nanagwas =

Village in Alwar District, Rajasthan, India

Coordinates: 28°06′N 76°24′E

Nanagwas is a small village located in Neemrana Tehsil of Kotputali Bheror District, Rajasthan, India.

== Population ==
In the 2011 Population Census, Nanagwas had a population of 2,317, including 1,169 males and 1,148 females. These made up a total of 449 families.

In Nanagwas village, the population of children ages 0–6 was 296 in 2011, 12.78% of the total population. The average sex ratio is 982, higher than the Rajasthan state average of 928. Child Sex Ratio for the Nanagwas as per census is 682, lower than Rajasthan average of 888.

Nanagwas village has a higher literacy rate than most of Rajasthan. In 2011, the literacy rate of Nanagwas village was 78.92% compared to 66.11% for Rajasthan as a whole. In Nanagwas, male literacy stood at 91.44% while the female literacy rate was 66.83%. The village also has a Government Senior secondary school for boys and girls.

As per the constitution of India and the Panchayati Raaj Act, Nanagwas village is the gram panchayat of Chawandi, Anandpur, and Nanagwas village administered by a Sarpanch (Head of Village) who is an elected representative of village.

== Caste factor ==
The village Nanagwas does not have any Scheduled Tribe (ST) population. The population of Nanagwas is composed mainly of Yadav and Brahmin people. Almost all of the people of Nanagwas belong to the Yadav community.

== Work Profile ==
More than 400 men of Nanagwas are in the armed forces. Two women are in the CISF. Many people are teachers, doctors and in public services . This village has given SDM and female Lieutenant. 1,248 of the inhabitants of Nanagwas were engaged in work activities. 71% of workers described their work as main work (employment or earning for more than six months), while 29% were involved in marginal activity, providing a livelihood for less than six months. Of the 1,248 workers engaged in main work, 645 were cultivators (owner or co-owner) while 31 were agricultural laborers.
