= Gujarwas =

Coordinates: 28°07′18″N 76°14′22″E

Gujarwas is a village in Ateli tehsil, Mahendragarh district, Haryana, India.

The village is on the Ateli–Mahendergarh road and is 5 kilometres from Ateli and 19 kilometres from Mahendergarh. The village has three government schools: one boys school up to metric and two schools for girls, one up to primary and another up to senior secondary class.

As of 2011, the population of Gujarwas was 2174, amongst the 357 households, out of which 52% males and 48% females, 28% are adults aged between 35 and 60, and 14% are seniors above age 60. Most people are involved in agricultural activities to earn.

== Temples ==
There are four main temples in the village, including Baba Gobindas. A Mela is celebrated every year on Chaitra Dwadasi three days before Holi celebration.
