= Nargis Begum =

West Bengal politician

Member of West Bengal Legislative Assembly
- In office 2016–2021
- Preceded by: Abul Hasem Mondal
- Succeeded by: Madhusudan Bhattacharya
- Constituency: Memari

Personal details
- Born: 1965 (age 60–61) Bardhaman district, West Bengal
- Party: All India Trinamool Congress

Nargis Begum is an Indian lawyer and politician belonging to the All India Trinamool Congress. She was the inaugural MLA of Memari Assembly constituency in the West Bengal Legislative Assembly.

== Early life and family ==
Begum was born in c. 1965 to a Bengali Muslim family in Bardhaman district, West Bengal. She was educated at the Nischintapur High Madrasah.

== Career ==
Begum contested in the 2016 West Bengal Legislative Assembly election where she ran as an All India Trinamool Congress candidate for Memari Assembly constituency, defeating Marxist politician Debashis Ghosh.
