= Andhra Pradesh Anganwadi Workers and Helpers Union =

Andhra Pradesh Anganwadi Workers and Helpers Union, a trade union of Anganwadi workers and helpers in Andhra Pradesh, India. Anganwadi workers and helpers are workers engaged by the government to work in the state operated Integrated Child Development Services which cater to the health and pre-school education needs of 0- to 6-year-old children; as also the health and nutrition needs of pregnant women, nursing mothers and adolescent girls. All 0- to 6-year-old children, all pregnant women, nursing mothers and adolescent girls in India are entitled to access to this Service. APAW&HU is affiliated to the Centre of Indian Trade Unions. The president of the union is B. Lalitamma and the secretary P. Roja.
