= Sandragudem =

Village in the state of Telangana, India

Sandragudem is a small village/hamlet in the state of Telangana, India. It has a population of 200 living in approximately 60 households, the village is 4 km (2.5 mi) from Govindharaopet mandal and 70 km (43 mi) from Warangal. The village is a part of Karlapally gram panchayath, Govindharaopet mandal. Initially, it was under Warangal district but after the creation of Telangana by bifurcation of Andhra Pradesh, it is now under Jayashanker district.

== Economy ==
The main livelihood for the people of Sandragudem is agriculture and some depend on daily wages, paddy is the main crop along with paddy people also cultivate cotton, green chillies, jowar, bajra, redgram (thur dal), green gram, vegetables, ground nut. the main source of irrigation water is Sri Rampathy canal from Laknavaram Lake which is one of the biggest lakes in the district. The lake is sustainable throughout the year, the major season for cropping is Karif. Rabi is available in every alternate year.

The village has piped water supply scheme (PWSS), which receives water from a well which is well lined by rocks collar. there are 4 hand pumps in the village serves to supply drinking water throughout the year, along with these there are many individual bore wells.

The village has 0.5 km pipeline for drinking water and a GLSR (ground level service reservoir) capacity is 1000 lts. it also has drainage system, grey water from all households finally released into the canal, there is no solid or liquid waste management in the village.

== Education ==
There is one primary school and Anganwadi center in the village. The books are provided to SC/ST students, mid-day meals are provided to all students.

== History ==
During the colonial period, there was a great pressure on the Lambani community as they initially recognized as De-notified tribes, the tribe was the biggest nomadic group which served many dynasties include Nizams and Kakathiyas. during the colonial period some of the people along with their families came and settled, they did deforestation and started cultivation, the hamlets/villages of lambada communities are called Thanda, there are many thandas around the sandragudem, in fact, the constituency is one of the biggest tribal constituency in India.

== Governance ==
Village- Sandragudem
GP & post- Karlapally
manadal- Govindharaopet
state (Assembly) constituency- Mulugu
central (parliament) constituency- Narsampet
postal code-506347
STD code-0850
MLA - Azmeera Chandula
MP - Prof. Azmeera Seetaram Naik
Main languages - Lambadi, Telugu
