= New Shrimadhopur DFC Station =

New Shrimadhopur DFC Station is a crossing station that was developed on Western Dedicated Freight Corridor (or Western DFC) of India. This crossing station was mainly developed for providing crossing facility to freight trains that will run on Western Dedicated Freight Corridor. This newly developed cross station was launched on first inaugural run of Western DFC Project on 15 August 2018. On this date, a partial section (i.e. 195 km length between Phulera in Rajasthan to Ateli in Haryana) of the entire Western DFC project was accomplished and launched. Similar to this crossing station, there are three other crossing stations and two junction stations between Ateli to Phulera section of Western DFC project. These crossing stations are New Dabla, New Bhagega and New Pachar Malikpur. At the same time, names of junction stations are New Ateli Junction and New Phulera Junction.

There are three additional tracks and two regular tracks on the new shrimadhopur DFC station. So, there is a total of five tracks on this railway station. Two are regular tracks. At the same time, three tracks are developed for providing halting facility and crossing facility to the freight trains on this route. The platform of 150 meter length has been built on this DFC station. Station master and other staff have been appointed on this railway station. Trial run for BLCS-A and BLCS-B on WDFC at New Shri Madhopur Station and Railcar Inspection have been conducted on DFC track. The video link is provided in the reference section. Indian Railways has also started Ro-Ro service between New Shrimadhopur DFC Station and New Palanpur DFC Station Ro-Ro services between New Shri Madhopur(SMPN)- New Palanpur (PNUN)-Samakhiali(SIOB) Stations over DFCCIL and Western Railway.
