= Samalki =

Samalki Sambhalkhi
- Village
- Location within Haryana Location within India
- Coordinates: 30.23278°N 76.83276°E
- Country: India
- State: Haryana
- District: Kurukshetra
- Tehsil: Shahabad

Population (2011)
  - Total: 1,830
  - Males: 985
  - Females: 845

Samalki is a village located in the Kurukshetra district of Haryana, India, near the town of Shahabad Markanda. The village hosts around 1830 people as per the 2011 census, with the main language spoken being Puadhi. It is often referred to as Sambhalkhi or Samalkhi by people.

== Demographics ==
According to the 2011 Census of India, Samalki had a population of 1,830, including 985 males and 845 females. In official Indian government classifications, 885 residents were listed as Scheduled Castes, 375 as Other Backward Classes, and 570 as part of the general category. The village had 201 children aged 0 to 6 and 349 households.

== Infrastructure ==
The village has a higher secondary school and two Anganwadi centers. The village also hosts a kheda, a gurudwara, a masjid and two main Hindu temples. There are several stores within the peripheries of the village that meet the needs of the local population.
