= Santosh Yadav (disambiguation) =

Santosh Yadav is an Indian mountaineer.

Santosh Yadav may also refer to:

- Santosh Yadav (politician), an Indian politician
- Santosh Yadav (Indian cricketer), an Indian cricketer
- Santosh Yadav (Nepalese cricketer), a Nepalese cricketer
