= Balwadi =

Balwadi is a native Marathi name for pre-schools in Maharashtra. It has been defined by J. S. Grewal who is quoted by R. P. Shukla as "A rural pre-primary school run economically but scientifically and using as many educational aids as possible, prepared from locally available material". It was developed by Tarabai Modak, the first balwadi was started in Bordi a coastal village in Thane district of Maharashtra by Nutan Bal Shikshan Sangh in 1945.

Modak started two types of balwadis namely central balwadi and angan balwadi or anganwadi. Central balwadis function during regular school hours and are centrally located whereas angan balwadis are located in the neighbourhood of the children targeted and have hours at their convenience. Modak's was a pioneer effort in providing non-formal education at pre-school level in India.

The purpose of balwadis is to provide a child facilities for physical and mental growth at school and at home. Thousands of balwadis have been set up all over India by government and non-government agencies.

Balwadis were further developed as a part of the government of India's poverty alleviation programme by universalising education. They were developed for children of India's rural poor. The Balwadi Nutrition Programme provides food for children at these schools.
