= Naba Kumar Chatterjee =

Indian politician

MLA of Memari
- In office 1972–1977
- Preceded by: Benoy Krishna Konar
- Succeeded by: Benoy Krishna Konar

Personal details
- Born: 1943/44
- Died: 22 August 2015
- Party: All India Trinamool Congress

Naba Kumar Chatterjee was an Indian politician belonging to All India Trinamool Congress. He was elected as a member of West Bengal Legislative Assembly from Memari in 1972. He joined All India Trinamool Congress from Indian National Congress on 14 March 2015. He died on 22 August 2015 at the age of 71.
