= Anita Yadav =

Indian politician

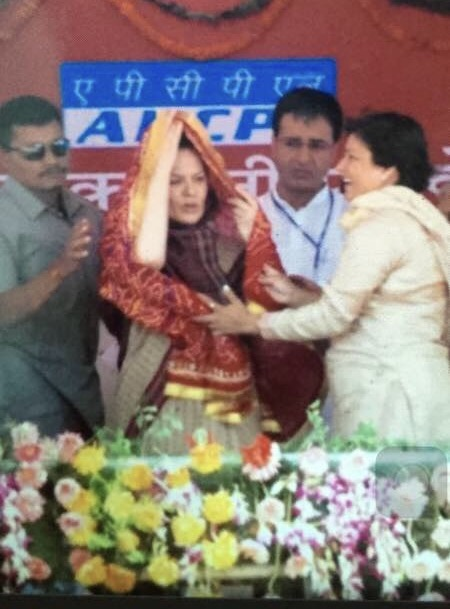
- Constituency: Salhawas (2000 and 2005); Ateli (2009)

Member of the Haryana Legislative Assembly
- In office 2000–Incumbent

Minister, Government of Haryana
- In office 2009–2014

Personal details
- Born: 20 April 1964 (age 62) Rewari, Haryana, India
- Party: Indian National Congress
- Spouse: Omkar Yadav
- Children: 1 son and 1 daughter
- Education: B.A., Diploma in Pharmacy, Bangalore (Karnataka)

Anita Yadav (born 20 April 1964) is an Indian politician from Indian National Congress who is a Member of Haryana Legislative Assembly and a former Minister representing the Ateli (Mahendergarh) Vidhan Sabha Constituency in Haryana. She entered politics as a District President from Rewari in Haryana state in 1995, and won first State Assembly Election as a Congressman in year 2000 from Salhawas constituency. She has been Consecutively winning Elections from year 2000 and serving 3rd tenure to the people.

Anita Yadav contested elections from Ateli constituency in year 2009 and scored a hat-trick in Ahirwal Belt despite tough competition from her rivals. She also served as the Minister of State as a Chief Parliamentary Secretary (CPS).

== Early life ==
Yadav was born to Umrao Singh on 20 April 1964 in Kanwali Haryana state's Rewari district. She completed her Graduation in Bachelor's of Arts (B.A) from Rewari and later pursued D. Pharma. i.e. a two-year Diploma in pharmacy from Board of Examining Authority, Bangalore (Karnataka).

== Political career ==
She has held the following positions:

- Member, A.I.C.C since year 2000
- Vice-president, District Council, Rewari
- District. President, Congress (I) 1995–2000
- General Secretary, All India Mahila Congress, 1997-2000
- President, Haryana Mahila Congress, 2000–2004
- SAARC Conference: All India Congress Committee Conventions (Adhiweshan) from the year 1995 to 2005
- Minister Of State: Chief Parliamentary Secretary

== Personal life ==
Yadav married Omkar Yadav, and they have two children.
