= Tarabai Modak =

Indian educator (1892–1973)

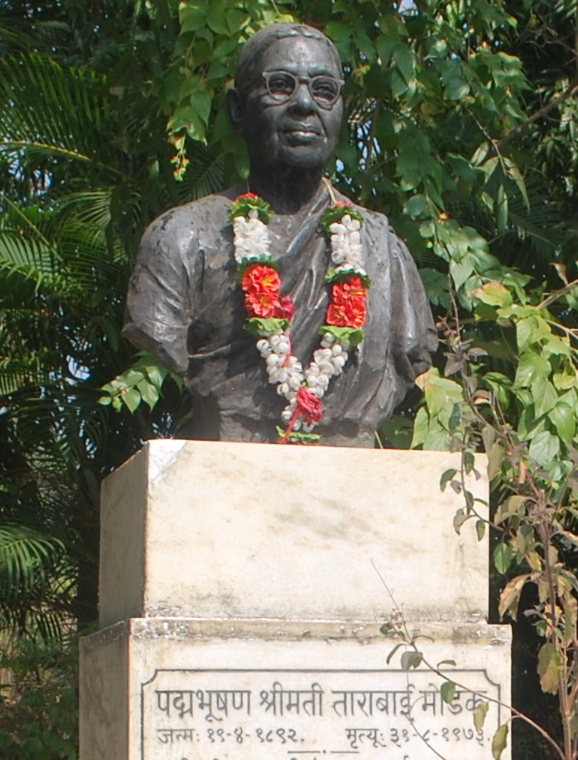
- Bust of Tarabai Modak on Kosbad Hill, near Dahanu (Maharashtra)
- Born: 1892; Bombay
- Died: 1973 (aged 80–81)
- Occupation: Social worker
- Known for: Preschool education (balwadis)
- Awards: Padma Bhushan 1962

Tarabai Modak (19 April 1892–1973) was an Indian educator and social worker, regarded as a pioneer of preschool education in India. She was born in Bombay and graduated from the University of Mumbai in 1914. She was married to a lawyer from Amravati, Mr Modak. They divorced in 1921.

She worked as a principal of a Women's College in Rajkot. Being a social worker from the Vidarbha region of Maharashtra, she was among the first to develop Balwadi s. The first balwadi was started in Bordi a coastal village in Thane district of Maharashtra by Nutan Bal Shikshan Sangh. She was awarded Padma Bhushan in 1962 for her work in preschool education. Anutai Wagh was her disciple. She was a member of the Indian National Congress.

== Legacy ==
A play based on her life, Ghar Tighancha Hava, was produced by Ratnakar Matkari.
