= Balwadi Nutrition Programme =

The Balwadi Nutrition Programme is a healthcare and education programme launched by the Government of India to provide food supplements at Balwadis to children of the age group 3–6 years in rural areas.

This program was started in 1970 under the Department of Social Welfare, Government of India. Four national level organizations including the Indian Council of Child Welfare are given grants to implement this program. The food supplement provides 300 kilocalories of energy and 10 grams of protein per child per day.Balwadis are being phased out because of the implementation of the Integrated Child Development Services programme.
