= Manab Guha =

Indian politician (born 1977)

Manab Guha (born 1977) is an Indian politician from West Bengal. He is a member of West Bengal Legislative Assembly from the Memari Assembly constituency in Purba Bardhaman district representing the Bharatiya Janata Party.

== Early life ==
Guha is from Memari, Purba Bardhaman district, West Bengal. He is the son of late Late Prasun Kumar Guha. He completed his Graduation in Arts at a college affiliated with Burdwan University in 1997.He is a journalist and his wife serves as a government employee. He declared his assets worth Rs.2 crore in his affidavit to the Election Commission of India.

== Career ==
Guha won the Memari Assembly constituency representing the Bharatiya Janata Party in the 2026 West Bengal Legislative Assembly election. He polled 1,10,790 votes and defeated his nearest rival, Rasbihari Halder of the All India Trinamool Congress, by a margin of 7,106 votes.
