= Seehma =

Place in Haryana, India

Seehma, Mahendragarh
- Sihma
- Location within Haryana
- Coordinates: 28.150870°N 76.165331°E
- Country: India

Government
  - Body: Village panchayat
- Time zone: UTC+5:30 (IST)
- PIN: 123028
- Vehicle registration: HR 35
- Website: www.mahendragarh.gov.in

Seehma (or Sihma) is a block and village of Narnaul tehsil in Mahendragarh district, Haryana, India.

== Demographics ==
At the 2011 India census, Seehma village had a population of 4,664 (2,422 males (51.92%) and 2,242 females (48.07%)) in 895 households. It a literacy (3,308) rate of 70.92%, less than the national average of 74%: male literacy (1,978) was 59.79% and female literacy (1,330) was 40.2%. 11.23% of the population were under 6 years of age (524).

== Nearby villages ==
- Ajam Nagar
- Akbarpur Ramu
- Atali Atali
- Chhapra Salimpur
- Deroli Ahir
- Dongra Ahir
- Dongra Jat
- Dublana
- DULOTH JAT (metchu)
- Faizabad
- Guwani
- Hudina
- Jat Guwana
- Kalwari
- Khampura
- Khaspur
- Khatripur
- Yogesh
- Mittarpura
- Mundia Khera
- Meerpur
- Nuni Kalan
- Rampura
- Sagarpur
- Saharpur
- Saluni
- Sihma
- Silarpur
- Nidhi
- Surani
- Seoramnathpura
