= 15 point Programme for minorities =

Prime Minister’s New 15 point Programme for minorities is a programme launched by Indian government for welfare of religious minorities in furtherance of reports by committees such as the Sachar Committee Report that highlighted that minorities, especially Muslims, in the country were often in a worse socio-economic and political condition than communities such as the Scheduled Caste and Scheduled Tribe communities that have been oppressed over millennia through the caste system (also referred to as the varna system). It pegged the status of minorities on various indicators such as nutrition, health, education et al. of minorities and specially Muslims at an abysmally poor level. The 15 point program was the government's response to these finding by laying down guidelines to target minorities in schemes and entitlements that are already in place and designing and executing new schemes aimed at the empowerment of these groups. The programme advocated allocating 15% of plan outlays of welfare schemes identified under the 15 point programme. Mainly, issues of education, credit, housing, employment and communal harmony fall under its ambit.

== 15 Points ==
1. Equitable availability of the Integrated Child Development Services (ICDS) - Aims at development of children and pregnant/lactating mothers from minorities and those living below the Below Poverty Line (India), by providing services such as better supplementary nutrition, immunization, health check-up and free education.
2. Improving access to School Education — Implement various Government schemes like Sarva Shiksha Abhiyan, Kasturba Gandhi Balika Vidyalaya scheme and other similar schemes in villages/localities having a substantial minority communities population.
3. Greater resources for teaching Urdu - Assistance in recruitment and posting of Urdu language teachers in primary and upper primary schools in villages/localities where at least one-fourth belong to that language group.
4. Modernizing Madrasa Education — Provide basis educational infrastructure and resources for the modernization of Madarsa education.
5. Scholarships for meritorious students from minority communities
6. Improving educational infrastructure through the Maulana Azad Education Foundation.
7. Self-Employment and Wage Employment for the poor — Earmark certain percentage of Swarnajayanti Gram Swarozgar Yojana scheme for minorities.
8. Upgradation of skill through technical training — Open new ITIs in areas predominantly inhabited by minority communities and upgrade some ITIs to ‘Centres of Excellence’.
9. Enhanced credit support for economic activities
10. Recruitment to State and Central Services
11. Equitable share in rural housing scheme — Earmark certain percentage in Indira Awaas Yojana for minorities.
12. Improvement in condition of slums inhabited by minority communities — Implement Integrated Housing & Slum Development Programme and Jawaharlal Nehru National Urban Renewal Mission in minority populated regions.
13. Prevention of communal incidents
14. Prosecution for communal offences
15. Rehabilitation of victims of communal riots.

Three more schemes were introduced into the 15 point programme for minorities in 2009 namely:

1. National Rural Drinking Water Programme (NRDWP)
2. Urban Infrastructure Development Scheme for Small and Medium Towns (UIDSSMT)
3. Urban Infrastructure and Governance (UIG)

Certain state governments have opposed the allocation of resources based on religion and called it communal budgeting and a ploy to divide society on religious lines.

== Implementation ==
The 15 point programme has been criticized for slow progress and lack of proper monitoring. The implementation of several schemes slowed down while many were closed after the BJP was ruled into power in 2014. A social organization, Khudai Khidmatgar, conducted a public audit of the programme in Malda, Meerut and Murshidabad and found that even educated people were not aware of the various minority schemes.
