= Abul Hasem Mondal =

West Bengal politician

Abul Hashem Mondal

Member of West Bengal Legislative Assembly
- In office 2011–2016
- Preceded by: Sandhya Bhattacharya
- Succeeded by: Nargis Begum
- Constituency: Memari

Personal details
- Born: 1946 (age 79–80) Kantipur, Bardhaman district, Bengal Presidency
- Party: All India Trinamool Congress

Abul Hashem Mondal is an Indian lawyer and politician belonging to the All India Trinamool Congress. He was the inaugural MLA of Memari Assembly constituency in the West Bengal Legislative Assembly.

== Early life and family ==
Mondal was born in c. 1946 a Bengali family of Muslim Mondals in Kantipur, Bardhaman district, Bengal Presidency. He is the son of Abul Kasem Mondal. Mondal is the possessor of Bachelor of Laws, Master of Laws and Doctorate of Philosophy degrees.

== Career ==
Mondal contested in the 2011 West Bengal Legislative Assembly election where he ran as an All India Trinamool Congress candidate for Memari Assembly constituency, defeating Marxist politician Debashis Ghosh.
