= Anutai Wagh =

Social reformer

Anutai Wagh (17 March 1910 – 1992) was one of the pioneers of pre-school education in India. She was the professional colleague of Tarabai Modak. She along with Modak pioneered a programme whose curriculum was indigenous, used low cost teaching aids and was aimed at holistic development of the participants. A. D. N. Bajpai describes her as a "towering social reformer". She was a recipient of the 1985 Jamnalal Bajaj Award. an Anutai Wagh Information Autobiography-From the hill of Kosbad
