= Sainbari murder =

1970 murders in West Bengal, India

Sainbari Murder
- Location: Bardhaman, West Bengal, India
- Date: 17 March 1970
- Victims: Pranab Kumar Sain; Malay Kumar Sain; Jitendranath Roy

The Sainbari incident refers to a violent political clash that occurred on 17 March 1970 in Bardhaman, West Bengal, India, during a period of intense political conflict between the Indian National Congress and the Communist Party of India (Marxist) (CPI(M)). The incident involved multiple deaths and became a subject of prolonged political controversy in the state.

== Background ==
The late 1960s and early 1970s in West Bengal were marked by significant political instability, including the fall of coalition governments and increasing clashes between rival political groups.

On 16 March 1970, the Second United Front government led by Chief Minister Ajoy Mukherjee was dismissed. In response, left parties including CPI(M) called for a statewide bandh (general strike) on 17 March.

The Sain family in Bardhaman was a zamindar family, and a strong supporter of the Congress. They were also allegedly involved in acts of aggression against CPI(M) supporters.

== Incident ==
On 17 March 1970, a procession associated with the bandh took place in Bardhaman town. According to accounts: the procession was initially peaceful. It was attacked with bombs and pipe guns by armed individuals allegedly associated with the Congress. The violence at the Sain residence occurred as part of a retaliatory clash rather than a premeditated attack. This claim was substantiated by the Mukherjee Commission report.

Reports alleged that as part of the retaliatory clash, a large group of CPI(M) supporters attacked the residence of the Sain family pelleting stones on their house, leading to the deaths of Malay Sain and Pranab Sain, along with another individual Jitendranath Roy. The mother of Sainbari was forcefully made to eat rice mixed with blood of her murdered sons after which the lady never came back to normal mentality.

== Legal proceedings ==
A criminal case (commonly referred to as the Sainbari case) was initiated based on a First Information Report (FIR) as Burdwan Police Station Case No. 50 of 1970 filed on the day of the incident. Charges were framed against multiple accused persons, including political figures like CPI(M) leader Benoy Konar. The State Govt appointed Retd. Judge Tarapada Mukherjee as Commission of Enquiry (known as the Mukherjee Commission) on 28th April 1970. It submitted its report to the State Govt on 27th July, 1970 mentioning that the local police and administration were unable to control the crowds and the situation.

In 1978, Judge R.K. Kar acquitted all the 83 people accused in the case.

== Aftermath ==
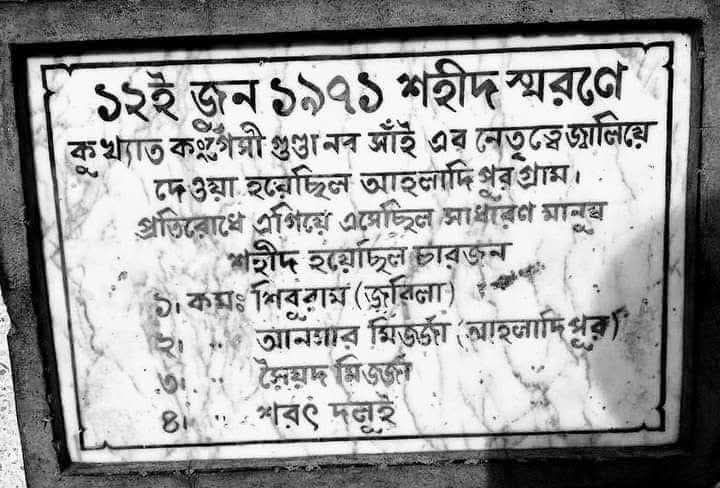
Memorial plaque of martyrs at Ahladipur Village, Bardhaman

Congress party leadership including Indira Gandhi had visited the house in the heart of Bardhaman town after the incident.

In 1971, Bhabadish Roy, a lawyer representing the accused in the Sainbari case, was killed; some accounts attribute the killing to individuals associated with the Congress party. On 12 June 1972, another episode of violence occurred in Ahladipur village in the Khandaghosh area. According to reports, a group associated with Congress led by Nabakumar Sain (another brother of the Sain family) attacked the village, resulting in the deaths of four individuals - Shibu Roy, Ansar Mirza, Syed Mirza and Sharat Dolui and the destruction of several houses.

In 2011 and the newly elected Trinamool government formed a commission to probe the incident under Retd. Justice Arunabha Basu. As per reports, the Arunabha Basu Commission had not submitted any report till date.
