= Nanakwas =

Nanakwas, Mahendragarh
- Location within Haryana Location within India
- Coordinates: 28°N 76°E
- Country: India

Government
  - Body: Village panchayat
- Time zone: UTC+5:30 (IST)
- PIN: 123xxx
- Website: www.mahendragarh.gov.in

Nanakwas is a village in Mahendragarh district, Haryana, India.

== Climate ==
Generally the climate is dry, with 461 mm of precipitation annually. It is hot in summer and cold in winter. The Köppen climate classification is BSh. The average annual temperature is 25.1 °C. The warmest month is June, with an average temperature of 34.1 °C. The coldest month is January, when the average temperature is 14.4 °C.

== Water quality ==
EC Value in Micro Mhos/Cm is above 6000.

== Nearby places ==
- Kothal Kalan
- Deroli Jat
- Atali
- Kothal Khurd
- Deroli Ahir
- Khatiwas
- Dulot
- Bhalkhi
- Sihma
- Dongra Ahir
