= Memari Assembly constituency =

Memari
- Constituency No. 265 for the West Bengal Legislative Assembly
- Interactive Map Outlining Memari Assembly Constituency

Constituency details
- Country: India
- Region: East India
- State: West Bengal
- District: Purba Bardhaman
- Lok Sabha constituency: Bardhaman Purba
- Established: 1962
- Total electors: 203,280
- Reservation: None

Member of Legislative Assembly
- 18th West Bengal Legislative Assembly
- Incumbent Manab Guha
- Party: BJP
- Alliance: NDA
- Elected year: 2026

Memari Assembly constituency is an assembly constituency in Purba Bardhaman district in the Indian state of West Bengal.

== Overview ==
As per orders of the Delimitation Commission, No. 265 Memari assembly constituency covers Memari municipality, Memari I community development block, and Kuchut, Satgachhia II gram panchayats of Memari II community development block.

As per orders of Delimitation Commission it is part of No. 38 Bardhaman Purba Lok Sabha constituency. Memari assembly segment was earlier part of Burdwan Lok Sabha constituency.

== Members of the Legislative Assembly ==
Year	Name	Party
1962	Suchand Soren	Communist Party of India
1967	P. Bishayee	Indian National Congress
1969	Benoy Krishna Konar	Communist Party of India (Marxist)
1971	Benoy Krishna Konar	Communist Party of India
1972	Naba Kumar Chatterjee	Indian National Congress
1977	Benoy Krishna Konar	Communist Party of India (Marxist)
1982	Maharani Konar	Communist Party of India (Marxist)
1987	Maharani Konar	Communist Party of India (Marxist)
1991	Maharani Konar	Communist Party of India (Marxist)
1996	Tapas Chattopadhyay	Communist Party of India (Marxist)
2001	Tapas Chattopadhyay	Communist Party of India (Marxist)
2006	Sandhya Bhattacharya	Communist Party of India (Marxist)
2011	Abul Hasem Mondal	Trinamool Congress
2016	Nargis Begum	Trinamool Congress
2021	Madhusudan Bhattacharya	Trinamool Congress
2026	Manab Guha	Bharatiya Janata Party

== Election results ==
=== 2026 ===
2026 West Bengal Legislative Assembly election: Memari
Party	Candidate	Votes	%	±%
BJP	Manab Guha	106,428	46.78	▲9.41
AITC	Rash Bihari Halder	99,322	43.66	▼4.26
CPI(M)	Krishanu Bhadra	16,891	7.42	▼4.29
NOTA	None of the above	1,229	0.54	▼0.22
Majority		7,106	3.12	▼7.43
Turnout		227,492	94.9	▲8.84
BJP gain from AITC		Swing		

=== 2021 ===
2021 West Bengal Legislative Assembly election: Memari
Party	Candidate	Votes	%	±%
AITC	Madhusudan Bhattacharya	104,851	47.92	▲1.57
BJP	Bhismadeb Bhattacharya	81,773	37.37	▲29.89
CPI(M)	Sanat Banerjee	25,618	11.71	▼30.28
BSP	Kalpana Mandal	2,121	0.97	▼0.17
NOTA	None of the above	1,673	0.76	
Majority		23,078	10.55	
Turnout		218,802	86.06	
AITC hold		Swing		

=== 2016 ===
2016 West Bengal Legislative Assembly election: Memari
Party	Candidate	Votes	%	±%
AITC	Nargis Begum	94,406	46.35	▼1.89
CPI(M)	Debashis Ghosh	85,523	41.99	▼4.53
BJP	Bhismadeb Bhattacharya	15,231	7.48	▲5.78
Independent	Srabanti Majumder	2,344	1.15	New entry
BSP	Dinesh Sikdar	2,325	1.14	▲0.60
NOTA	None of the above	2,287	1.12	New entry
JDP	Budo Murmu	1,558	0.76	▼0.29
Majority		8,883	4.36	▲2.64
Turnout		2,03,674	87.31	▼3.47
AITC hold		Swing		

=== 2011 ===
2011 West Bengal Legislative Assembly election: Memari
Party	Candidate	Votes	%	±%
AITC	Abul Hasem Mondal	89,083	48.24	
CPI(M)	Debashis Ghosh	85,905	46.52	
BJP	Biswajit Poddar	3,138	1.70	
JMM	Ananda Mohan Biswas	2,036	1.10	
JDP	Sukumar Saren	1,936	1.05	
PDCI	Radharani Murmu	1,578	0.85	
BSP	Mukul Biswas	989	0.54	
Majority		3,178	1.72	
Turnout		1,84,665	90.78	
AITC gain from CPI(M)		Swing		

=== 2006 ===
Sandhya Bhattacharya of CPI(M) won the Memari assembly seat defeating her nearest rival Sk. Mohammad Ismile of Trinamool Congress in the 2006 assembly elections. Contests in most years were multi cornered but only winners and runners are being mentioned. In 2001 and 1996, Tapas Chattopadhyay of CPI(M) defeated Syed Mustaq Murshed of Trinamool Congress and Naba Kumar Chatterjee of Congress in the respective years. In 1991, 1987 and 1982, Maharani Konar of CPI(M) defeated Abdul Ohidmolla, Naba Kumar Chatterjee and Sabyasachi Samanta, all of Congress, in the respective years. In 1977, Benoy Konar of CPI(M) defeated Surya Narayan Pal of Janata Party.

=== 1972 ===
Naba Kumar Chatterjee of Congress won in 1972. Benoy Krishna Konar of CPI(M) won in 1971 and 1969. P.Bishayee won in 1967. In 1962, Suchand Soren of CPI won the Memari seat reserved for scheduled tribes. Prior to that the seat did not exist.
