= Benoy Krishna Konar =

Indian politician (1930–2014)

Benoy Kishna Konar

President of the All India Kisan Sabha
- In office 20 November 1995 – 8 March 1999
- Preceded by: N. Sankaraiah
- Succeeded by: S. Ramachandran Pillai

Member of the West Bengal Legislative Assembly
- In office 1977–1982
- Preceded by: Naba Kumar Chatterjee
- Succeeded by: Maharani Konar
- Constituency: Memari
- In office 1969–1972
- Preceded by: P. Bishayee
- Succeeded by: Naba Kumar Chatterjee
- Constituency: Memari

Personal details
- Born: 24 April 1930 Memari, Burdwan, Bengal Presidency, British India
- Died: 14 September 2014 (aged 84) Kolkata, West Bengal, India
- Party: Communist Party of India (Marxist) (1964–2014); Communist Party of India (1948–1964)
- Spouse: Maharani Konar
- Relatives: Hare Krishna Konar (brother)

Benoy Krishna Konar (Bengali: বিনয় কোঙার; 24 April 1930 – 14 September 2014) was an Indian politician, communist leader, and one of the pioneers of the peasant uprising in West Bengal. He was the president of the All India Kisan Sabha and a member of the West Bengal Legislative Assembly for 8 years. Konar was one of the most controversial leaders of the Communist Party of India (Marxist) because of his direct involvement in the Sainbari murder, Nandigram violence, and Singur controversy.

== Early life ==
Benoy Krishna Konar was born in 1930 his father is Sharatchandra Konar and his mother name is Satyabala Devi in an affluent family of farmers in Memari in Purba Bardhaman district. His official Address is Kamargoria. He is the younger brother of Famous Politician Comrade Hare Krishna Konar. So, from younger age he gets attracted to Communist Party.

== Political career ==
Like his elder brother Harekrishna Konar, he became fully involved in organising the peasant movement in Burdwan. He led various struggles of the agricultural workers and poor peasants. Benoy Konar became an important leader of the Kisan movement of West Bengal and served as the general secretary and president of the state Kisan Sabha. Later he became the national president of the All India Kisan Sabha, a post in which he served for a number of years. Benoy Konar was a staunch Marxist–Leninist. He was a member of the West Bengal state committee of the CPI(M) from 1982 and became a member of the state secretariat in 1991. He was elected to the Central Committee of the Party in 1995 and became chairman of the Central Control Commission in the 20th Congress of the Party. He was a member of the state legislative assembly from Memari constituency thrice. Comrade Benoy Konar had to face police repression during his political activities. He was jailed under a number of false cases and spent six years and nine months in jail. He had also worked underground during the peasants struggles in Burdwan. Benoy Konar served the Communist Party with great distinction. He was a powerful speaker. He was known for his firm ideological commitment to Marxism and led an exemplary life marked by simplicity. He was elected to the West Bengal Legislative Assembly from the Memari (Vidhan Sabha constituency) in 1969, 1971 and 1977. His wife, Maharani Konar, was elected from the same constituency in 1982, 1987 and 1991. He was known for making caustic remarks against the Trinamool Congress and its chief Mamata Banerjee which had drawn flak even from allies during Singur and Nandigram agitations. Konar had also taken potshots against the then West Bengal Governor, Gopalkrishna Gandhi, after the Nadigram killing in 2007.

== Controversies ==
Konar was alleged to be linked to the Sainbari murder case where 3 brothers of the Sain family were brutally murdered, their home set on fire, an infant thrown into the fire and the family members thoroughly traumatized. The other names linked to this murder were those of Anil Basu, Nirupam Sen and Amal Halder, all senior CPI(M) leaders. The Sain family has not received justice to date.

== Death ==
Konar died at Kolkata on 14 September 2014 after a prolonged illness.
