= Naresh Yadav Ateli =

Indian politician (1963–2024)

Naresh Yadav
- Constituency: Ateli

Personal details
- Born: 1 February 1963 Ratta Kalan, Mahendragarh District, Punjab, India
- Died: 5 November 2024 (aged 61) Gurugram, Haryana, India
- Party: Indian National Congress
- Spouse: Smt. Omkala Yadav (wife)

Naresh Yadav Ateli (1 February 1963 – 5 November 2024) was an Indian politician who was a member of the Legislative Assembly for the Ateli constituency in Haryana state. He was the president of Haryana Yuva Kisaan Sangharsh Samiti.

== Career ==
Naresh Yadav was the President of Haryana Agricultural University aka "HAU" and General Secretary of the Haryana Pradesh Youth Congress. He was elected as an Independent Candidate for the Haryana Legislative Assembly in 2005.

In 2005, Ateli was a Member of the Legislative Assembly of Haryana.

He held the following offices:

- Member, A.I.C.C.
- President, Haryana Yuva Kisan Sangharsh Samiti.
- President, All India Federal Democratic Party.
- Member, I.F.U.N.A.

== Personal life and death ==
Ateli was born at the Rata Kalan Village in Ateli Nangal Tehsil of Mahendragarh District, Haryana State, on 1 February 1963. He attained Master of Science (Agriculture) and LL.B in Alwar and Hisar city. After completing his studies, he married Omkala Yadav Singh. He had a son and a daughter.

Ateli died in Gurugram on 5 November 2024, at the age of 61.
