= Ateli railway station =

Railway station in Haryana, India

Ateli

General information
- Location: State Highway 26, Ateli, Haryana; India
- Coordinates: 28.1170205°N 76.2288217°E
- Elevation: 253 metres (830 ft)
- System: Indian Railways station
- Owner: Indian Railways
- Operator: North Western Railway
- Line: Delhi–Rewari line
- Platforms: 2

Construction
- Structure type: Standard on ground

Other information
- Status: Functioning
- Station code: AEL
- Division(s): Bikaner
Location
- Location within Haryana

Ateli Railway Station is a station on the Delhi–Narnaul line. It is located in the Indian state of Haryana. It serves Ateli and surrounding areas.

== The railway station ==
Ateli railway station is located at an altitude of 253 metres (830 ft) above mean sea level. It was allotted the railway code of AEL under the jurisdiction of Bikaner railway division.

== History ==
In 1876, metre-gauge track from Delhi to Rewari and further to Narnaul was laid in 1873 by Indian Railway.

Preceding station	Indian Railways	Following station
Kathuwas towards ?	North Western Railway zone Delhi–Narnaul line	Mirzapur Bchaud towards ?
