= Madhusudan Bhattacharya =

Indian politician

Madhusudan Bhattacharya (born 1950) is an Indian politician from West Bengal. He is a member of the West Bengal Legislative Assembly from Memari Assembly constituency in Purba Bardhaman district. He won the 2021 West Bengal Legislative Assembly election representing the All India Trinamool Congress party.

== Early life and education ==
Bhattacharya is from Memari, Purba Bardhaman district, West Bengal. He is the son of late Kanai Bhattacharya. He completed his Master of Arts in English in 1974 at the University of Burdwan. He is a retired school teacher.

== Career ==
Bhattacharya won from Memari Assembly constituency representing the All India Trinamool Congress in the 2021 West Bengal Legislative Assembly election. He polled 104,851 votes and defeated his nearest rival, Bhismadeb Bhattacharya of the Bharatiya Janata Party, by a margin of 23,078 votes.
