= Guwani =

Guwani, Narnaul
- village
- Location in Haryana Guwani, Narnaul (India)
- Coordinates: 28.083311°N 76.178121°E
- Country: India

Government
  - Body: Village panchayat

Population (2011)
  - Total: 3,215
- Time zone: UTC+5:30 (IST)
- PIN: 123001
- Telephone code: 01282
- Vehicle registration: HR35
- Website: www.mahendragarh.gov.in

Guwani is a village in Narnaul Tehsil, Mahendragarh District, Haryana, India, in Gurgaon division. Guwani is near the Rewari-Kanina- Mahendergarh road, 11.0 kilometres (6.8 mi) east of the district headquarters at Narnaul. Its postal head office is at Narnaul.

== Demographics of 2011 ==
As of 2011 India census, Guwani had a population of 3215 in 589 households. Males (1693) constitute 52.65% of the population and females (1522) 47.34%. Guwani has an average literacy (2188) rate of 68.05%, lower than the national average of 74%: male literacy (1311) is 59.91%, and female literacy (877) is 40.08% of total literates (2188). In Guwani, Mahendergarh 11.97% of the population is under 6 years of age (385).
