= Santosh Yadav (politician) =

Indian politician

Deputy Speaker of Haryana Legislative Assembly
- In office 4 September 2015 – 23 Oct 2019
- Constituency: Ateli

Personal details
- Born: 29 September 1955 (age 70) Kuksi, Mahendragarh district, Punjab (Now Haryana)
- Party: Bharatiya Janata Party
- Spouse: Om Prakash Yadav
- Children: 1 Son
- Parent(s): Bhagwan Singh and Chander Kalan

Santosh Yadav (born 1955) is an Indian politician. She is the incumbent deputy speaker of the Haryana Legislative Assembly. She was MLA from constituency Ateli. She is also having a house in Narnaul. She has two brothers. She joined BJP after leaving INLD. She is having her workers from many villages like Dongra ahir etc. She approached for passing PHC in Dongra Ahir and also a road from Dongra Ahir to nearby village. She is very well supported in her area [Ateli]. She did not get election ticket from BJP in 2019 election. She was good in sports during her childhood. She visits Dongra ahir frequently. She is very popular.
