= Integrated Child Development Services =

Indian government program

- Country: India
- Launched: 2 October 1975; 51 years ago
- Website: icds.gov.in/en

Integrated Child Development Services (ICDS) is a government program in India which provides nutritional meals, preschool education, primary healthcare, immunization, health check-up and referral services to children under 6 years of age and their mothers. The scheme was launched in 1975, discontinued in 1978 by the government of Morarji Desai, and then reinstated by the Charan Singh soon after with support of the Indira Gandhi opposition.

The Tenth five-year plan also linked ICDS to Anganwadi centres established mainly in rural areas and staffed with frontline workers. In addition to improving child nutrition and immunization, the programme is also intended to combat gender inequality by providing girls the same resources as boys.

A 2005 study found that the ICDS programme was not particularly effective in reducing malnutrition, largely because of implementation problems and because the poorest states had received the least coverage and funding. During the 2018–19 fiscal year, the Indian federal government allocated ₹16,335 crore (US$1.7 billion) to the programme, which is 60% of the funding for the programme while the states allocated the remaining 40%. The widespread network of ICDS has an important role in combating malnutrition especially for children of weaker groups.

== Background ==
The infant mortality rate of Indian children is 3.4% and the under-five mortality rate is 3.9% and 25% of newborn children are underweight among other nutritional, immunization and educational deficiencies of children in India. Figures for India are below the standards of the developed world.

ICDS was launched in 1975 in accordance to the National Policy for Children in India. Over the years it has grown into one of the largest integrated family and community welfare schemes in the world. Given its effectiveness over the last few decades, Government of India has committed towards ensuring universal availability of the programme.

== Scope of services ==
The following services are sponsored under ICDS to help achieve its objectives:

1. Supplementary nutrition
2. Nutrition and Health Education
3. Immunisation
4. Health checkup
5. Referral services
6. Pre-school education(Non-Formal)
7. Contraceptive counselling for adolescents

== Implementation ==
For nutritional purposes ICDS provides 500 kilocalories (with 12–15 grams of protein) every day to every child from 6 months to 6 years of age. For adolescent girls in the age group of 10 to 19, 6 kilograms of food grain is given every month.

The services of Immunisation, Health Check-up and Referral Services delivered through Public Health Infrastructure under the Ministry of Health and Family Welfare. UNICEF has provided essential supplies for the ICDS scheme since 1975. World Bank has also assisted with the financial and technical support for the programme. The cost of ICDS programme averages $10–$22 per child a year. The scheme is Centrally sponsored with the state governments contributing up to ₹1.00 (1.0¢ US) per day per child.

Furthermore, in 2008, the GOI adopted the World Health Organization standards for measuring and monitoring the child growth and development, both for the ICDS and the National Rural Health Mission (NRHM). These standards were developed by WHO through an intensive study of six developing countries since 1997. They are known as New WHO Child Growth Standard and measure of physical growth, nutritional status and motor development of children from birth to 5 years age.

== Challenges ==
Despite increasing funding over the past three decades, the ICDS fell short of its stated objectives and still faces a number of challenges. Also, though it has widespread coverage, operational gaps mean that service delivery is not consistent in quality and quantity across the country.

== Impact ==
By end of 2010, the programme is claiming to reach 80.6 lakh expectant and lactating mothers along with 3.93 crore children (under 6 years of age). There are 6,719 operational projects with 1,241,749 operational Aanganwadi centres. Several positive benefits of the programme have been documented and reported

- A study in Andhra Pradesh and Karnataka demonstrated significant improvement in the mental and social development of all children irrespective of their gender.
- A 1992 study of National Institute of Public Cooperation and Child Development confirmed improvements in birth-weight and infant mortality of Indian children along with improved immunization and nutrition.
- Several studies have shown that ICDS can improve long-term health and educational outcomes of adolescents and adults.

However, World Bank has also highlighted certain key shortcomings of the programme including inability to target the girl child improvements, participation of wealthier and middle-class children more than low-income children and lowest level of funding for the poorest and the most undernourished states of India.

== See also ==
- 15 point Programme for minorities
- Balwadi Nutrition Programme
- Malnutrition in India
- Malnutrition in India (Section ICDS)
- Mina Swaminathan
- School Meals in India
