= Ateli =

Ateli Ateli Mandi
- Town
- Nickname: Mandi
- Location in Haryana, India Ateli (India)
- Coordinates: 28.1°N 76.28°E
- Country: India
- State: Haryana
- District: Mahendragarh
- Established: 14th century CE
- Founder: Chiraag Singh
- Elevation: 299 m (981 ft)

Population (2001)
  - Total: 5,671

Languages
  - Official: Hindi
- Time zone: UTC+5:30 (IST)
- PIN: 123021
- ISO 3166 code: IN-HR
- Vehicle registration: HR-35
- Sex ratio: 10:9 ♂/♀
- Website: haryana.gov.in

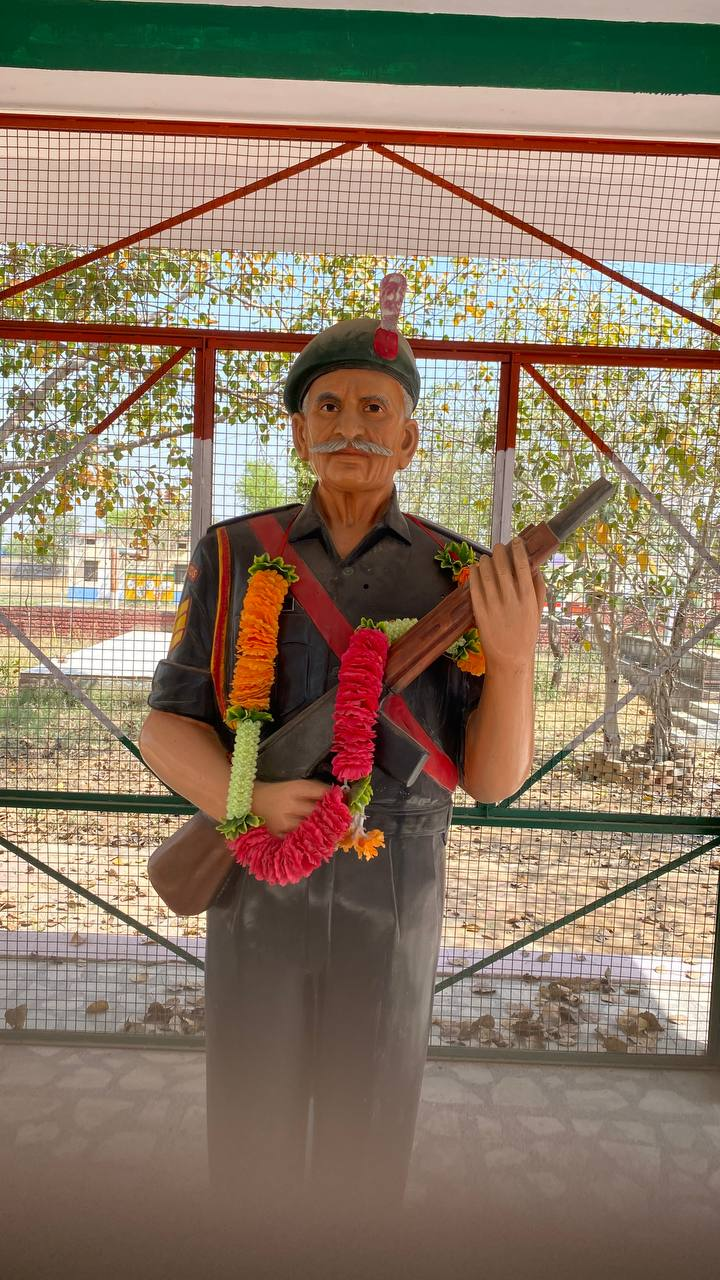
Hav Dhansi Ram, VrC(1947–48)

Ateli is a town and a municipal committee near Narnaul in Mahendragarh district in the north Indian state of Haryana. There are eight villages in Ateli tehsil.

== Geography ==
Ateli has an average elevation of 299 m (980 feet).

== Demographics ==
As of 2011 India census, Ateli had a population of 8678. Males constitute 52% of the population and females 48%. Ateli has an average literacy rate of 78%, higher than the national average of 59.5%; with 58% of the males and 42% of females being literate. Thirteen percent of the population is under six years of age.

== Transportation ==
=== Railways ===
Ateli railway station lies on the Rewari-Narnaul route. Only slow passenger trains Chetak Express (12982) Delhi sarai rohilla- ajmer (02066) Mumbai Bandra Bi-weekly (22452) Ringas Mela Special (04792) halts here.

=== Roads ===
Rewari-Narnaul highway was a state highway, SH 26, that has been named a national highway, NH 11. The highway is being widened to four lanes. The NH connects Rewari to Ateli, Narnaul, Jhunjhunu and Bikaner.

== Politics ==
The current state MLA of Ateli is Arti Singh Rao of BJP.
