= Anganwadi =

Type of rural child care in India poshan track

- Formation: 1975
- Founder: Government of India
- Type: Governmental organization
- Legal status: Governmental organization
- Purpose: Combat hunger and malnutrition of children.
- Origins: India
- Affiliations: Government of India

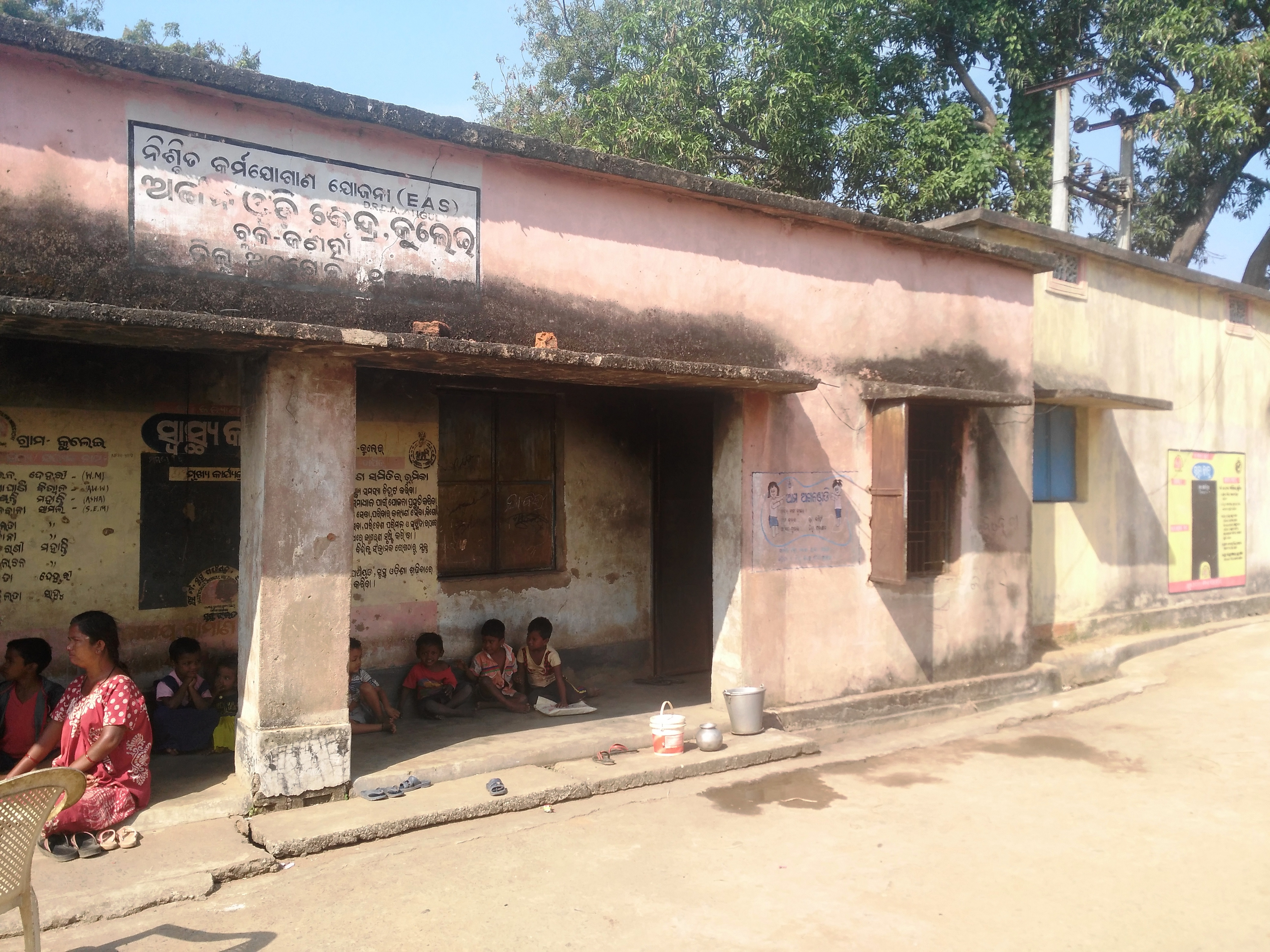
Anganwadi Kendra Kulei

Anganwadi (Hindi pronunciation: [ãːɡɐnɐʋaːɖiː]) is a type of rural child care centre in India. It was started by the Indian government in the state of Maharashtra in 1975 as part of the Integrated Child Development Services programme to combat child hunger and malnutrition. In Marathi, Anganwadi means "courtyard shelter".

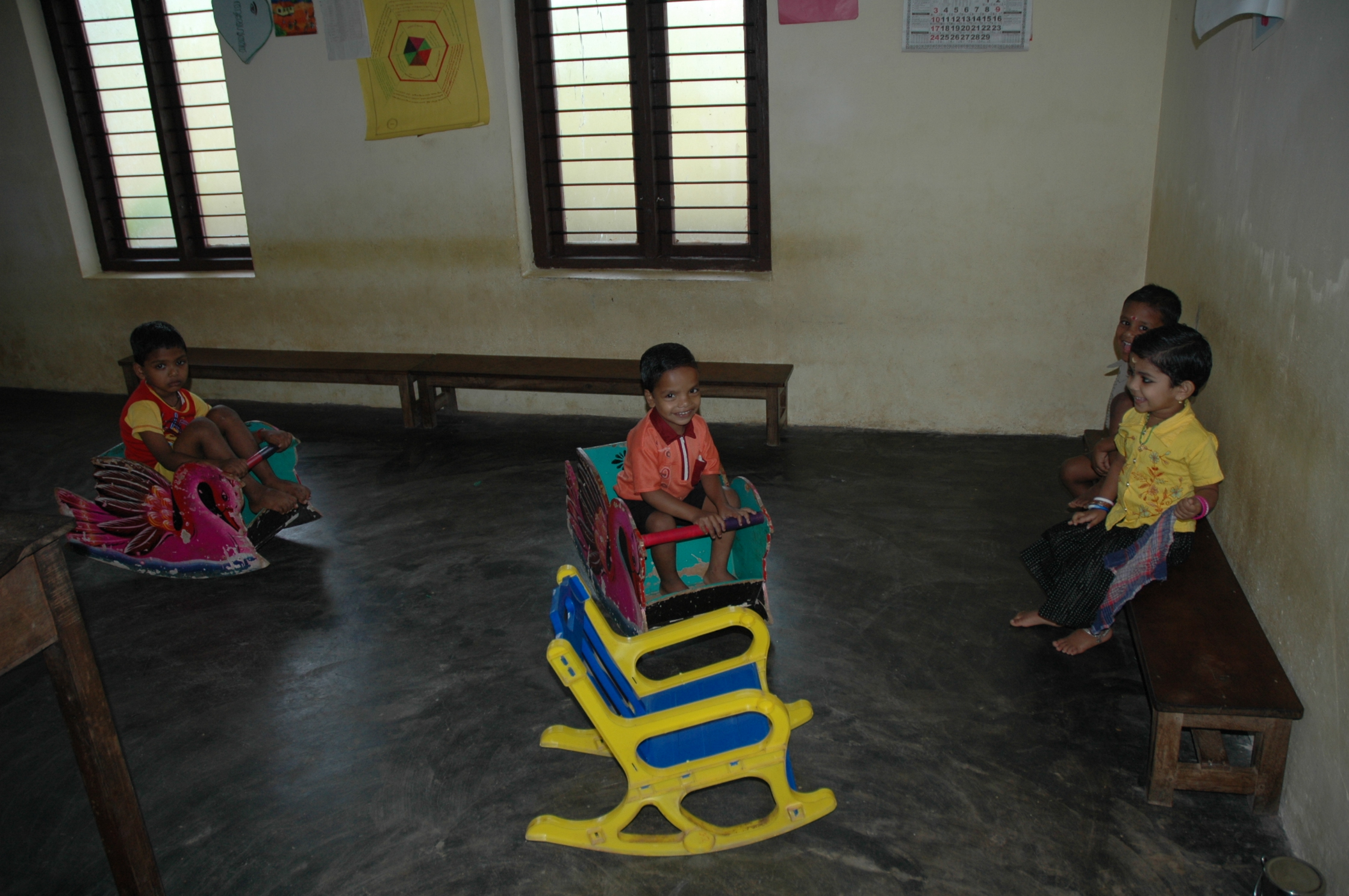
Children at Nirappam kunnu Anganwadi Centre

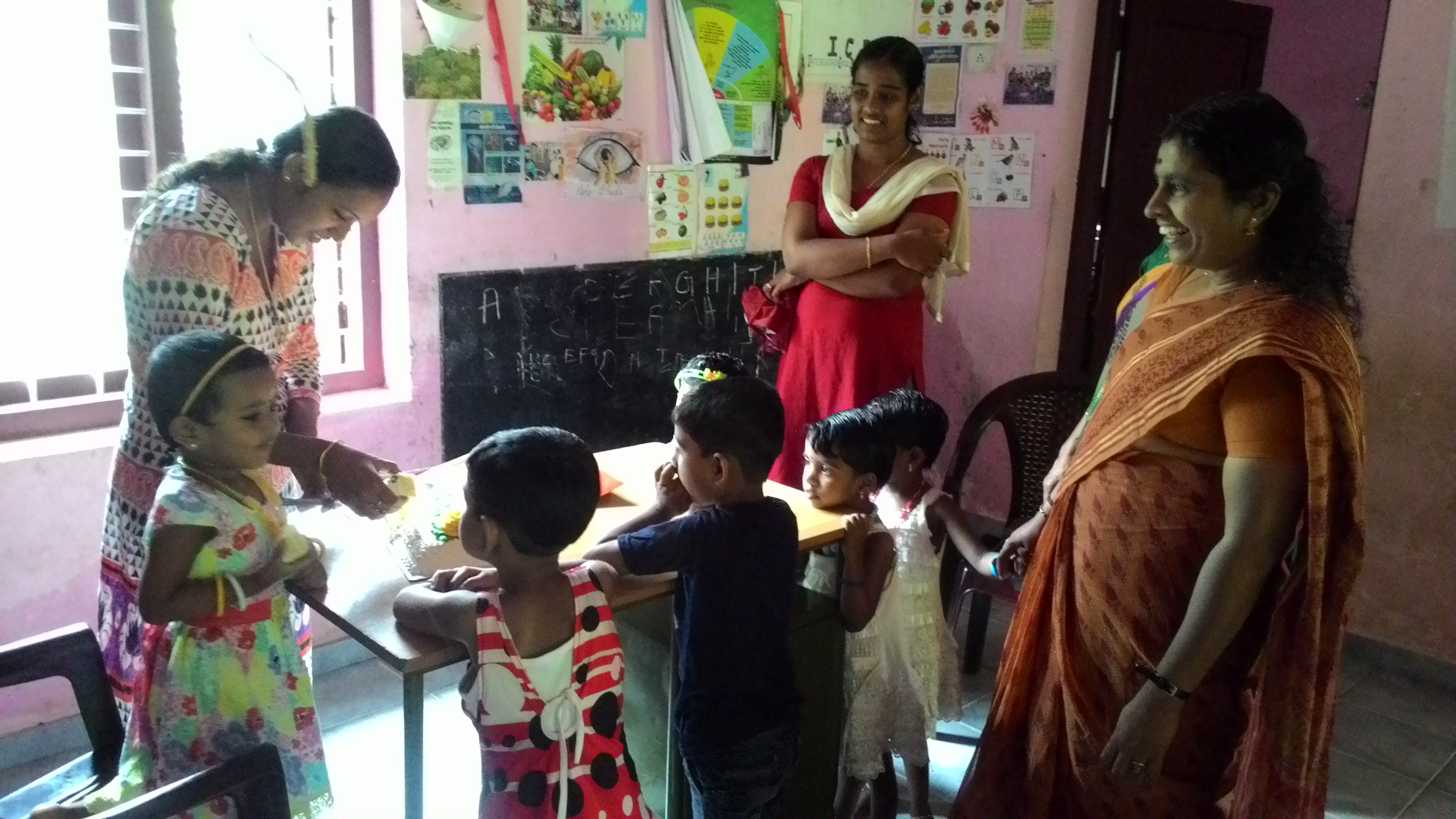
Birthday celebration at Karunaram Anganwadi

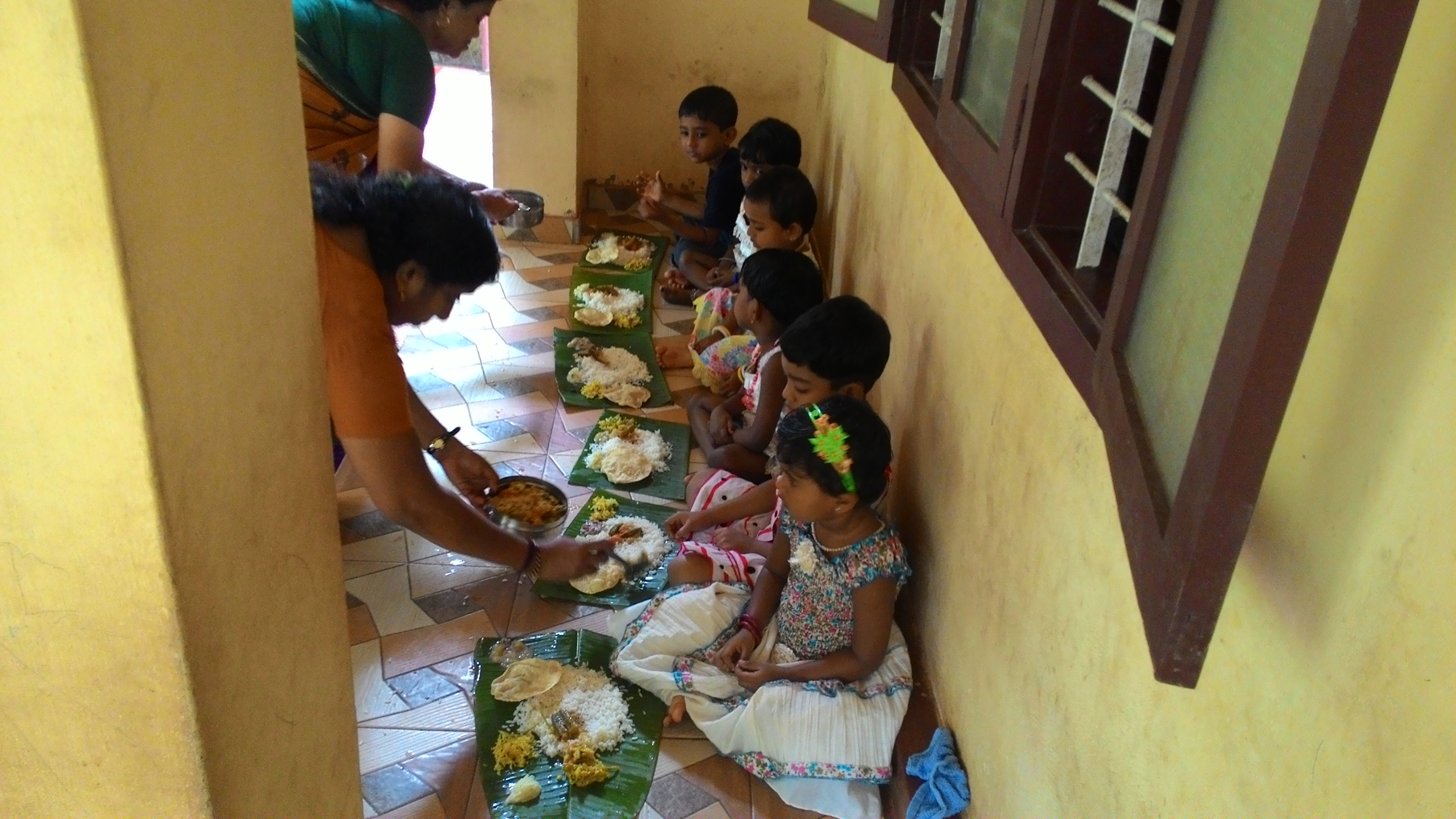
Midday meals on a special day, at Karunaram Anganwadi

A typical Anganwadi centre provides basic health care in a village. It is part of the Indian public health care system. Basic health care activities include contraceptive counselling and supply, nutrition education and supplementation, as well as pre-school activities. The centres may be used as depots for oral rehydration salts, basic medicines and contraceptives. Under the modernised Mission Saksham Anganwadi and Poshan 2.0 framework, there are 14.03 lakh (1.403 million) operational Anganwadi centres across India, serving approximately 8.98 crore (89.8 million) registered beneficiaries.

== Benefits ==
Despite decades of impressive growth, India has an acute shortage of doctors. The doctor population ratio in 2019–20 was 1:1456; against the WHO recommended level of 1:1000. Through the Anganwadi system, India is trying to meet its goal of providing affordable and accessible healthcare to local populations.

Anganwadi workers also participate in systematic capacity-building and community mobilization initiatives. Under the "Poshan Bhi Padhai Bhi" programme, over 10.35 lakh Anganwadi workers have been trained in early childhood education, while their localised presence allows them to effectively lead community-based events to drive behavioral change in grassroots nutritional and healthcare practices. As locals, they know and are comfortable with the local language and ways, are acquainted with the people, and are trusted.

== Challenges and solutions ==
Public policy discussions have taken place over whether to make Anganwadis universally available to all eligible children and mothers who want their children there. This would require significant increases in budgetary allocation and a rise in the number of Anganwadis to over 1.6 million.

The officers and their helpers who staff Anganwadis are typically women from poor families. The workers do not have permanent jobs with comprehensive retirement benefits like other government staff. Worker protests (by the All India Anganwadi Workers Federation) and public debates on this topic are ongoing. There are periodic reports of corruption and crimes against women in some Anganwadi centres. There are legal and societal issues when Anganwadi-serviced children fall sick or die.

In announcing the 2022 budget, then Indian Finance Minister Nirmala Sitharaman stated that salaries would be increased for Anganwadi workers to ₹20,105 per month and for helpers to ₹10,000 per month. But with minuscule increment in the overall umbrella budget of just 0.7%. It has been allocated ₹20,263 crore for the next fiscal, as compared to last year’s allocation of ₹20,105 crore. As compared to revised estimate of ₹199999.55 crore there is a 1.3% increase.

In March 2008 there was debate about whether packaged foods (such as biscuits) should become part of the food served. Detractors, including Nobel Prize winner Amartya Sen, argued against it, saying that it will become the only food consumed by the children. Options for increasing partnerships with the private sector are continuing.

In a major initiative, the work of Anganwadis is being digitized, starting with the 27 most economically disadvantaged districts in Uttar Pradesh: Bihar, Madhya Pradesh, Rajasthan, Odisha and Andhra Pradesh. In March 2021, Anganwadis' workers were provided with a smartphone app to record data that will be integrated with the health ministry, which is involved in carrying out immunization, health check-ups, and nutrition education under Integrated Child Development Services. They were informed that failure to upload digitally-entered records could result in salary and food suspension. Difficulties emerged with this smartphone app's reportedly being hard to use, being written in only English, and demanding more memory than cheap smartphones have. Anganwadi employees, mostly women who earn less than $150 a month, if they even have smartphones, experienced repeated crashes of this app or found that they do not understand enough English to use it. Many lack phone reception and electricity in their villages and ask why meticulously written ledgers, used for years, no longer suffice.

In order to ensure growth monitoring of children and home visits, an incentive of Rs. 500 and Rs. 250 is provided per month to Anganwadi Workers (AWWs) and Anganwadi Helpers (AWHs).

== Integration with other official schemes ==
The Integrated Child Development Services scheme did not have provision for the construction of AWC buildings as this was envisaged to be provided by the community except for the North Eastern States. For them, financial support was provided for construction of AWC buildings since 2001-02 at a unit cost of ₹175,000.

As part of the strengthening and restructuring the ICDS scheme, the government approved a provision of construction of 200,000 Anganwadi centre buildings at a cost of ₹450,000 per unit during XII Plan period in a phased manner with a cost-sharing ratio of 75:25 between centre and states (other than the NER, where it will be at 90:10).

Further, construction of AWC has been notified as a permissible activity under the Mahatma Gandhi National Rural Employment Guarantee Act (MNREGA). The construction of AWC buildings can be taken up in convergence with MNREGA.

Planned renaming of few schemes under new umbrella term i.e. Saksham Anganwadi and Poshan 2.0 includes anganwadi services, Poshan Abhiyan, scheme for adolescent girls, and national creche scheme.

== International efforts ==
UNICEF and the UN Millennium Development Goals of reducing infant mortality and improving maternal care are the impetus for increasing focus on the Anganwadis. Workers and helpers are expected to be trained per WHO standards.

== See also ==
- Auxiliary nurse midwife
- Accredited Social Health Activist
