= List of villages in Bhiwani district =

This is a list of villages in the Bhiwani district of the Indian state of Haryana sorted by tehsil. Population data is from the 2011 Census of India.

== Bawani Khera tehsil ==
Bawani Khera tehsil
Town/Village name	Population	Males	Females
Aurangnagar	387	214	173
Baliali	12,440	6,562	5,878
Barsi	23,327	12,423	10,904
Bohal	1,919	991	918
Jamalpur	8,846	4,668	4,178
Kungar	9,846	5,292	4,554
Lohari Jatu	8,971	4,631	4,340
Paposa	3,731	2,021	1,710
Pur	6,961	3,682	3,279
Ramupura	1,977	1,056	921
Ratera	5,572	2,923	2,649
Rohnat	3,785	1,970	1,815
Siwara	4,176	2,211	1,965
Sumra Khera	875	474	401
Sui	5,063	2,677	2,386
Taga	45	23	22
Dhani jamalpur	209	107	102

Sipar

== Bhiwani tehsil ==
Bhiwani tehsil
Town/Village name	Population	Males	Females
Badala	5,855	3,079	2,776
Badesra	7,241	3,898	3,343
Bamla	10,859	5,943	4,916
Bapora	14,332	7,651	6,681
Bhiwani Lohar	4,087	2,505	1,582
Biran	5,088	2,676	2,412
Chang	12,979	6,961	6,018
Dhareru	5,491	2,956	2,535
Devsar	12,408	6,603	5,885
Dhab Dhani	2,954	1,564	1,390
Dhanana	11,766	6,325	5,441
Dhana Narsan			
Dinod	15,792	8,398	7,394
Golagarh	2,836	1,485	1,351
Golpura			
Ghuskani	3,070	1,653	1,417
Gudha	2,959	1,595	1,394
Gujrani	4,883	2,640	2,243
Haluwas	3,910	2,104	1,806
Jatai	2,952	1,604	1,348
Jui Khurd	6,821	3,631	3,208
Kairu	9,894	5,241	4,653
Kaluwas	2,259	1,215	1,044
Kaunt	4,017	2,143	1,874
Kayla	4,052	2,212	1,840
Kelanga	13,910	7,404	6,506
Kharak Kalan	12,605	6,697	5,908
Kharak Khurd	5,113	2,703	2,410
Kohar	5,242	2,746	2,496
Mandhana	6,164	3,305	2,859
Manheru	8,214	4,450	3,764
Mitathal	7,434	4,002	3,432
Mundhal Kalan	3,034	1,593	1,441
Mundhal Khurd	8,837	4,716	4,121
Naurangabad	3,016	1,633	1,383
Nathuwas	2,641	1,440	1,201
Ninan	1,594	836	758
Pahladgarh	5,286	3,209	2,506
Paluwas	7,370	3,863	3,507
Paposa	3,731	2,021	1,710
Prem Nagar	3,495	1,849	1,646
Rajpura Kharkari	1,124	602	522
Rewari Khera	4,924	2,588	2,336
Roopgarh			
Sai	6,080	3,241	2,839
Sanga	4,539	2,449	2,090
Sarsa	2,884	1,588	1,326
Shimliwas	1,625	874	751
Talu	8,243	4,469	3,774
Tigrana	10,712	5,703	5,009
Tigri	653	353	300

== Loharu tehsil ==
Loharu tehsil
Town/Village name	Population	Males	Females
Barwas	2233	1191	1042
Damkora			
Shahajmanpur	650	348	302
Bisalwas			
Cheher Kalan			
Gigawaa			
Jhanjhara Bass			
Jhanjhara Toda			
Jhanjhara Sheoran			
Sighani			
Pahadi			
Serla	2352	1240	1112
Fartia Tal			
Fartia Bhima			
Fartia Kehar			
Gagarwas			
Dhani Toda			
Ghani Ahmed			
Surpura Khurd	2114	1105	1009
Gokalpura			
Ahmedwas			

== Siwani tehsil ==
Siwani tehsil
Town/Village name	Population	Males	Females
Ghanghala			
Garwa			
Kalod	3,045	1,638	1,407
Mitthi			
Budhshelli			

== Tosham tehsil ==
Tosham tehsil
Town/Village name	Population	Males	Females
Baganwala	3,543	1,914	1,629
Chhapar Rangran	1,882	1,011	871
Chhapar Jogian	1,192	637	555
Dhani Miran			
Saral	3,045	1,624	1,421
Riwasa	6,328	3,333	2,995
Dadam			
Dang Kalan	2,359	1,254	1,105
Dang Khurd	2,108	1,118	990
Laxmanpura	880	482	398
Laxmanpura	2,400	1,300	1,100
Miran	8000	4500	3500

== See also ==
- List of villages in Charkhi Dadri district
