= Dhanana =

Dhanana धनाना
- Village
- Location in Haryana, India Dhanana (India)
- Coordinates: 28.9353°N 76.1635°E
- Country: India
- State: Haryana
- District: Bhiwani
- Tehsil: Bhiwani
- Founder: founder of dhanana village is "Dhanna Jat"

Government
  - Body: Village panchayat

Population (2011)
  - Total: 11,766
  - Rank: 4th

Languages
  - Official: Hindi
- Time zone: UTC+5:30 (IST)
- PIN: 127031
- Vehicle registration: HR 16

Dhanana (Hindi: ধনানা) is a village in the eponymous tehsil of the Bhiwani district in the Indian state of Haryana. It lies approximately 15 kilometres (9.3 mi) north of the district headquarters town of Bhiwani on Bhiwani to Jind Road. This village is directly connected by roads with 9 villages: Talu, Bhaini Bharro, Badesara, Mitathal, Ghuskani, Tigdana, Mandhana, Pur and Siwara. Three neighbouring small villages are also part of Dhanana: Jatai, Sukhpura and Kuchpad. The fields are very far away from the village and so farmers had difficulties in reaching their fields for work so they started living in their own fields, which led to the formation of Jatai, Sukhpura, and Kuchpad villages. The favourite game of the village is handball which makes it special at national level. Village also thrives with a vibrant sports culture, especially in boxing. Home to stars like Nitu Ghanghas and Sakshi Chaudhary, it has produced world-class talent. Nitu’s Commonwealth gold and Sakshi’s youth titles highlight the village’s dedication to the sport, inspiring young athletes daily.

== Geography and schools ==
There is a very large Anaj mandi (a wholesale market of food grains in South Asia) where grains are collected and then transported for stock to Bhiwani. In this village there are five water reservoir tanks: one in Dhanana 1; and, two in Dhanana 3. In half of the harvested area crop rice is grown, and in the other half crop millet and cotton. There are three primary schools, one school for girls only and one higher government school, as well as 6-7 private schools. There is a government hospital here which serves 14 villages. In this hospital dental, X ray, child delivery and many more facilities are available, as well as a veterinary hospital.

There is a majority of the Jat caste with the surname Ghanghas . As of the 2011 Census of India, the village had 2,349 households with a population of 11,766 of which 6,325 were male and 5,441 female.For political representational purposes the village is part of Bawani Khera Assembly constituency and the Bhiwani-Mahendragarh Lok Sabha constituency.

== Area division ==
Dhanana is divided in three regions (panna) named:

- Dhanana 1 - Tihada panna
- Dhanana 2 - Milvan panna
- Dhanana 3 - Kalhaan panna

== Religion ==
Dhanana has many demigods, among them:

1. Mata Fulamde:- Worshipped on Wednesday generally. Four fairs are also arranged at Mata Fulumde Mandir continuously on Wednesdays only after Holi but nowadays fairs are arranged every Wednesday.

2. Baba Bhramchari Mandir:- Situated in Dhanana 3 and worshipped on the 12th of the month according to the Hindu calendar.

3. Goga Mandir:- There are separate temples for the separate pannas but the temple of Dhanana 1 temple is the largest and most beautiful.

4. Baba Kuchpadiya Mandir:- The people not only of Dhanana but also of Jatai, Sukhpura and Bhaini Bharro also believe in this deity who is worshipped on Dashami tithi according to the Hindu calendar. In this temple people worship with milk. Children come there to have bhandarā prasad and drink milk until they are full. Some of the main Mehant names are Baba Dayadas, Syanti Das, Gyan Das, Sankar Das, Charmati Das and Gyan Das. Others of the main temples are Bhaiya Baba, Bhudhi Mata, Chauganan Mata, Khada Baba, Dadu Dyal Mandir and Khatu Syam Mandir. People not only from the neighbouring villages but from more distant cities and countries like Nepal also visit Dhanana for its religious value.
