= Kayla, Bhiwani =

Village in Haryana, India

Kayla कायला
- Village
- Location of Kayla in Haryana, India Kayla (India)
- Coordinates: 28°45′18″N 76°15′40″E
- Country: India
- State: Haryana
- District: Bhiwani
- Tehsil: Bhiwani

Government
  - Type: Gram panchayat
  - Sarpanch: Sharda Devi w/o Madan Pal Singh

Area
  - Total: 10.61 km^{2} (4.10 sq mi)

Population (2011)
  - Total: 4,052
- Time zone: UTC+05:30 (IST)
- PIN: 127309

Kayla is a village in Bhiwani tehsil, Bhiwani district, of the Indian state of Haryana. It is a gram panchayat and lies about 13 km from the district headquarters at Bhiwani. As of the 2011 Census of India, it had a population of 4,052 across 738 households.

== Geography ==
Kayla lies in the Bhiwani tehsil of the Rohtak division of Haryana. The village has a geographical area of 1,061 hectares (10.61 km²). Nearby villages include Badala, Sankrod, Sanga, Manheru and Dhareru.

== Demographics ==
As of the 2011 Census, Kayla had 738 households and a population of 4,052, of whom 2,212 were male and 1,840 female. The sex ratio was 832 females per 1,000 males, below the Haryana average of 879. There were 506 children aged 0–6 (12.49% of the population).

The average literacy rate was 76.00% (male 84.72%, female 65.72%), compared with 75.55% for Haryana. Scheduled Castes numbered 838 (20.68%); there was no Scheduled Tribes population.

Of the 1,453 people classed as workers, 1,329 were main workers and 124 marginal workers. Among main workers, 571 were cultivators (owners or co-owners) and 188 were agricultural labourers.

== Education ==
Kayla has a government senior secondary school. In March 2023 it served as an examination centre for the Haryana Board of School Education Class X and XII examinations, with students from six nearby villages appearing there. The village gram panchayat organised volunteers to guard the school during the examinations to prevent unfair means.

== Administration ==
Kayla is governed by an elected gram panchayat headed by a sarpanch under the Panchayati Raj system. The gram panchayat covers Kayla village alone and is divided into 13 wards.

Following the 2022 local elections, Aarti Devi is the current Sarpanch of Kayla. The 13 wards are represented by elected Panches (ward members) to ensure diverse representation across Unreserved, Scheduled Caste, and Backward Class categories, with specific seats reserved for women.

Previously, Sharda Devi served as the Sarpanch after being elected in the January 2016 local elections. The village falls under the Bhiwani Assembly constituency and the Bhiwani–Mahendragarh Lok Sabha constituency.

== See also ==
- List of villages in Bhiwani district
