= Jatai, Bhiwani =

Jatai baahman garh
- Village
- Location within Haryana Location within India
- Coordinates: 28°57′57″N 76°11′05″E
- Country: India
- State: Haryana
- District: Bhiwani
- Tehsil: Bhiwani

Government
  - Body: Village panchayat

Population (2011)
  - Total: 2,952

Languages
  - Official: Hindi
- Time zone: UTC+5:30 (IST)

Jatai is a village in the Bhiwani district of the Indian state of Haryana. It lies approximately 21 kilometres (13 mi) north west of the district headquarters town of Bhiwani. The nearest villages are Dhanana and Talu, on the Bhiwani - Jind Highway. As of the 2011 Census of India the village had 525 households with a population of 2,952 of which 1,604 were male and 1,348 female.For political representational purposes the village is part of Bawani Khera Assembly constituency and the Bhiwani-Mahendragarh Lok Sabha constituency.
