= Jamalpur, Bhiwani =

Jamalpur
- Village
- Location in Haryana, India Jamalpur (India)
- Coordinates: 28°57′43″N 75°57′25″E
- Country: India
- Established: 1260
- Founder: Named a person Jamaal
- Named for: Jamalpur

Government
  - Type: Bharatiya Janata Party
  - Body: Panchayat
  - Sarpanch: RAJKUMAR LIC

Area
  - Total: 541 km^{2} (209 sq mi)
  - Rank: 1 Rank
- Elevation: 215 m (705 ft)

Population (2011)
  - Total: 8,846
  - Density: 16.4/km^{2} (42.3/sq mi)

Languages
  - Official: Hindi
- Time zone: UTC+5:30 (IST)
- PIN: 127035
- Vehicle registration: HR 16
- Website: haryana.gov.in

Jamalpur is a village in the Bawani Khera tehsil and Bawani Khera (Vidhan Sabha constituency) of Bhiwani district in Haryana state of India. It lies approximately 8 kilometres (5.0 mi) north west of Bawani Khera and 25 kilometres (16 mi) south east of the district headquarters town of Bhiwani.

== Demographic ==
As of the 2011 Census of India, the village had 1723 households with a population of 8,846 of which 4,668 were male and 4,178 female.For political representational purposes the village is part of Bawani Khera Assembly constituency and the Hisar Lok Sabha constituency.

== Economy ==
Economy is mainly agrarian, supported by small number of government job and minor local commercial activities such as Ishan Automobiles, an authorized service centre of Bajaj Two-wheeler.

== See also ==
- Bidhwan
- Badya Jattan
- Badyan Brahmnan
- Kanwari
- Nalwa
- Tosham
