= Badesra =

- Location within Haryana Location within India
- Coordinates: 28.926°N 76.207°E
- Country: India
- State: Haryana
- District: Bhiwani district

Badesra / Badesara is a village in the Bhiwani district of the Indian state of Haryana.The present sarpanch of Badesra is Bablu Sarpanch. The village lies approximately 15 kilometres (9.3 mi) north east of the district headquarters town of Bhiwani.

For political representational purposes the village is part of Bawani Khera Assembly constituency and the Bhiwani-Mahendragarh Lok Sabha constituency.

== People ==
As of the 2011 Census of India, it had 1,456 households with a population of 7,241, of which 3,898 were male, and 3,343 female. Nearby villages are Dhanaana, Sisar Khas, Taalu, Mitathal, Ghuskaani. The village is predominantly occupied by Jaats (also known as Zamindaars). Major Jaat and Braman surnames (Kaushik & Attri) in the village are, Singal, Bagri, Saipawar (also known as Saipanwar, Panwar or Pawar) and Jaats with the surname Dagar. It is said that a prominent landlord/zamindaar in the British Era named "Sai Pawar" migrated from a village named "Khachroli" in today's Jhajjar District of the state in the 18th century to Badesara and all his descendants have prefixed the first name of their ancestor to the surname to denote that they are the descendants of the landlord Shri Sai Pawar. The surnames "Saipawar" and "Pawar" are same and marriages between the two are not allowed.

The village has given many officers and men to the Indian Armed Forces and sportsmen to the country. The Badesara Kabaddi team has been very popular in circle kabbadi and represented India in the Indo-Pak Kabaddi match in 1999. Tinu Badesra, Surendra Kala and Bijendra Badesra are well known names in Kabaddi who hailed from Badesra. Mahavir Chakra Awardee, Lt Col Dharam Singh hailed from Badesara Village. Badesara is a progressive village of the district Bhiwani as well as the state of Haryana. Badesra also boasts a thriving sports culture with boxing being particularly popular.

== Geography ==
Historical records for this region date back about 400 years. Badesra is considered a clean and developed village. Badesra has cold winters and hot summers.

Roli Mata's pond is local site in Badesra. Whenever there was no rain in Badesra, people used to desilt this pond and provide offerings to Lord Indra.

For educational needs, there are many schools in Badesra. There are several renowned private schools and two government funded schools.

Badesara has a thriving milk production and poultry farming industry. There are two major dairies inside Badesra, one of which is the Amit Milk Production Center and Barham Milk Center.
