= Barsi =

Coordinates: 29.047°N 76.023°E

For people with the surname, see Barsi (surname).

Barsi is a city in Bawani Khera sub-district of Bhiwani district in Haryana, India. As of the 2011 Census of India, the village had 4,474 households with a population of 23,327 of which 12,423 were male and 10,904 female.For political representational purposes the village is part of Bawani Khera Assembly constituency and the Bhiwani-Mahendragarh Lok Sabha constituency.
