= Rohnat =

- Village
- Nicknames: Village of rebels Martyr's village
- Location within Haryana Location within India
- Coordinates: 29.0093°N 75.9153°E
- Country: India
- State: Haryana
- District: Bhiwani
- Tehsil: Bawani Khera

Government
  - Body: Village panchayat

Population (2011)
  - Total: 3,785

Languages
  - Official: Hindi
- Time zone: UTC+5:30 (IST)

Rohnat, nicknamed village of rebels, is a village in the Bawani Khera tehsil of the Bhiwani district in the Indian state of Haryana. It lies approximately 31 kilometres (19 mi) north west of the district headquarters town of Bhiwani. It is 12 km from Hansi on the MDR 108 Kanwari-Hansi road, 25 km from Hisar, 160 km from Delhi and 220 km from Chandigarh.For political representational purposes the village is part of Bawani Khera Assembly constituency and the Hisar Lok Sabha constituency.

On 26 March 2022 Manish Joshi Bismil a famous theatre director of Haryana performed a play Dastan E Rohnat in Hisar.

== Geography ==
Nearby villages include Kanwari, Muzadpur and Nalwa. The village of Balali, the home village of the Phogat sisters is also close. The village, which lies in the basin of the Saraswati River and the Yamuna, is irrigated by the Sunder distributary of the Western Yamuna Canal.

== History ==
Due to its participation in the Indian Rebellion of 1857, the village was nicknamed by the British Raj as the village of rebels. All the land of zamindars was taken away and freedom fighters were crushed under road rollers.

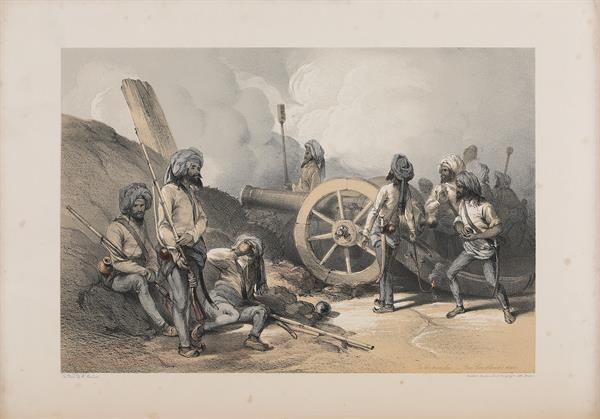
Gen. Courtland's men

General Courtland attacked the village for their prolific role in the rebellion and the villagers fought back bravely. Courtland ordered the destruction of the village by bombarding it with cannon shells. Birhad Bairagi was tied to the mouth of a canon and blasted. Among the villagers who were caught, some were hanged by the still-extant banyan tree [dying and in the need of revival] on the banks of Dhab Johad wetland, others were crushed in Hansi town under the road roller on the Lal Sadak (literally Red Road). Naunda Jat and Rupa Khati were among the martyrs. Surviving villagers refused to apologise, as required by the British colonials, for their part in the 1857 war of independence. Consequently, the land of the freedom fighters was confiscated and auctioned off as a punishment.

The villagers still claim rights to the allegedly auctioned land. Due to this, villagers used to abstain from celebrating the Independence Day or unfurling the national flag because as per them, freedom had not yet arrived. On Martyrs Day on 23 March 2018, Chief Minister Manoharlal Khattar, for the first time, got a village elder to unfurl the flag in the village.

== Demographics ==
As of the 2011 Census of India, the village had 711 households with a population of 3,785, of which 1,970 were male and 1,815 female.

== Culture ==
The major temple is Jakhli dham. Hindu festivals are celebrated every year. Teej is a popular Haryanvi festival observed with the music of Haryana.

== Tourism ==
The village lies on the Golden Trinagle of West Haryana tourism i.e. the Hisar (Firoz Shah Palace Complex, Agroha Mound, Rakhi Garhi) - Hansi (Asigarh Fort) - Tosham (Tosham fort & rock inscription and Tosham Hill range) tourism circuit.

The government is developing the Rohnat Ahutatma Smarak (martyr's memorial) under the Rohnat Freedom Trust on 4 acres of land to commemorate the valour and sacrifice during the revolt of 1857. The installation of the tallest Indian flag is also planned, as well as the renovation on well martyrs and the revival of the dying tree on which martyrs were hanged.

== See also ==
- Administrative divisions of Haryana
- Madhogarh Fort, Haryana
- Tourism in Haryana
- Tourism in India
