= Kharak Khurd =

Kharak Khurd Kharak
- Village
- Nickname: kharakiya
- Location in Haryana, India Kharak Khurd (India)
- Coordinates: 28.807°N 76.355°E
- Country: India
- State: Haryana
- District: Bhiwani
- Tehsil: Bhiwani
- Established: 850

Government
  - Body: Village panchayat

Area
  - Total: 25 km^{2} (9.7 sq mi)

Population (2011)
  - Total: 5,113
  - Density: 200/km^{2} (530/sq mi)

Languages
  - Official: Hindi
- Time zone: UTC+5:30 (IST)
- PIN: 127114
- Vehicle registration: HR 16

Kharak Khurd is a village in the Bhiwani district of the Indian state of Haryana. It lies approximately 20 kilometres (12 mi) north east of the district headquarters town of Bhiwani.

== Demographics ==
As of the 2011 Census of India, the village had 990 households with a population of 5,113, of which 2,703 were male and 2,410 were female. Most of the population belongs to the Rajput Panwar(Parmar) caste.

== Geography ==
Because Kharak Kalan and Kharak Khurd are adjacent it is difficult to identify a boundary between the two. The main place of worship in Kharak Khurd is Dadi Tamoli Devi and uttamwala( Uttimala), a large temple situated in the north of the village most of villagers depend on farming, Job and business and for their livelihood. The Dadari feeder canal provides the main source of agricultural irrigation in the area.

Kharak Khurd is well connected via road and rail. Kalinga is the nearest village, located approximately four kilometers from Kharak.

There are six main areas in the village:

1. Andha Pana (Th. Gulab Singh, Dr. Rajpal Singh)
2. Lalu Pana
3. Balhan Pana
4. Nathu Pana
5. Shuru Pana
6. Bagu Pana

== Politics ==
For political representational purposes the village is part of Bawani Khera Assembly constituency and the Bhiwani-Mahendragarh Lok Sabha constituency. Khurd is represented in the legislature by Bishmbhar Balmiki, a member of the legislative Assembly from the Bharatiya Janta Party.
