= Shimliwas =

Shimliwas Simli
- Village
- Location in Haryana, India Shimliwas (India)
- Coordinates: 28.7172°N 75.9213°E
- Country: India
- State: Haryana
- District: Bhiwani
- Tehsil: Tosham

Government
  - Type: Gram Panchayat
  - Body: Village panchayat

Population (2011)
  - Total: 1,625

Languages
  - Official: Hindi
- Time zone: UTC+5:30 (IST)
- PIN: 127029

Shimliwas or Simlibass is a village in the Bhiwani district of the Indian state of Haryana. Located in the Tosham tehsil, it lies approximately 22 kilometres (14 mi) south west of the district headquarters town of Bhiwani. As of the 2011 Census of India, the village had 323 households with a total population of 1,625 of which 874 were male and 751 female.

It is bordered by Mansarbass to the North, Jitwanbass to the South, Jatan Dhani and Kairu to the west, and Dhani Mahu to the East. The spoken language in Simlibass is Haryanvi/Hindi.

Agriculture is the primary occupation for the residents of the village. Because of this, they are one of the major producers of grain and milk in the state.

The Sarpanch is the village representative within the Panchayat Raj System. The Sarpanch is elected by the people through a democratic voting system, though the democratic integrity of Panchayat Raj system has been questioned. The position is similar to that of a mayor in North America. For political representational purposes the village is part of Tosham Assembly constituency and the Bhiwani-Mahendragarh Lok Sabha constituency.
