= Aurangnagar =

- Village
- Location in Haryana, India Aurangnagar (India)
- Coordinates: 28.997°N 75.987°E
- Country: India
- State: Haryana
- District: Bhiwani
- Mandal: Bhiwani

Population (2011)
  - Total: 387

Languages
  - Official: Hindi
- Time zone: UTC+5:30 (IST)

Aurangnagar is a village in Bhiwani district of the Indian state of Haryana. It lies approximately 26 kilometres (16 mi) north of the district headquarters town of Bhiwani. As of the 2011 Census of India, the village had 62 households with a population of 387 of which 214 were male and 173 female.For political representational purposes the village is part of Bawani Khera Assembly constituency and the Bhiwani-Mahendragarh Lok Sabha constituency.
