= Patodi, Bhiwani =

Coordinates: 28.784°N 75.813°E

Patodi is a village in the Bhiwani district of the Indian state of Haryana. It lies approximately 31 kilometres (19 mi) west of the district headquarters town of Bhiwani. As of the 2011 Census of India, the village had 548 households with a population of 3,043 of which 1,618 were male and 1,425 female.For political representational purposes the village is part of Tosham Assembly constituency and the Bhiwani-Mahendragarh Lok Sabha constituency.

== See also ==
- Pataudi
