= Kaluwas, Bhiwani =

- Village
- Location in Haryana, India Kaluwas, Bhiwani (India)
- Coordinates: 28.8236°N 76.1758°E
- Country: India
- State: Haryana
- District: Bhiwani
- Tehsil: Bhiwani

Government
  - Body: Village panchayat

Population (2011)
  - Total: 2,259

Languages
  - Official: Hindi
- Time zone: UTC+5:30 (IST)

Kaluwas is a village in the Bhiwani district of the Indian state of Haryana. It lies approximately 5 kilometres (3.1 mi) north east of the district headquarters town of Bhiwani. As of the 2011 Census of India, the village had 455 households with a total population of 2,259 of which 1,215 were male and 1,044 female.For political representational purposes the village is part of Bawani Khera Assembly constituency and the Bhiwani-Mahendragarh Lok Sabha constituency.
