= Mundhal Kalan =

- Village
- Location in Haryana, India Mundhal Kalan (India)
- Coordinates: 29.002°N 76.149°E
- Country: India
- State: Haryana
- District: Bhiwani
- Tehsil: Bhiwani

Government
  - Body: Village panchayat

Population (2011)
  - Total: 3,304

Languages
  - Official: Hindi
- Time zone: UTC+5:30 (IST)

Mundhal Kalan is a village in the Bhiwani district of the Indian state of Haryana. It lies approximately 22 kilometres (14 mi) north of the district headquarters town of Bhiwani. As of the 2011 Census of India, the village had 503 households with a population of 3,034 of which 1,593 were male and 1,441 female. Mundhal Khurd, earlier a separate habitation, is now contiguous to Mundhal Kalan, and both are collectively known as "Mundhal".For political representational purposes the village is part of Bawani Khera Assembly constituency and the Bhiwani-Mahendragarh Lok Sabha constituency.

Khurd and Kalan are words that indicate the main (Khurd) and smaller satellite extension (Kalan) of a town, village or settlement.

== See also ==
- Administrative divisions of Haryana
- List of districts of Haryana
