= Gudha, Bhiwani =

Gudha
- Village
- Location in Haryana, India Gudha (India)
- Coordinates: 28.7304°N 75.8969°E
- Country: India
- State: Haryana
- District: Bhiwani
- Tehsil: Tosham

Government
  - Body: Village panchayat

Population (2011)
  - Total: 2,959

Languages
  - Official: Hindi
- Time zone: UTC+5:30 (IST)

Gudha is a village in the Bhiwani district of the Indian state of Haryana. Located in the Tosham tehsil, it lies approximately 25 kilometres (16 mi) west of the district headquarters town of Bhiwani. As of the 2011 Census of India, the village had 559 households with a total population of 2,959 of which 1,595 were male and 1,394 female.For political representational purposes the village is part of Loharu Assembly constituency and the Bhiwani-Mahendragarh Lok Sabha constituency.
