= Chhapar Rangran =

- Village
- Location in Haryana, India Chhapar Rangran (India)
- Coordinates: 28.8555°N 75.8064°E
- Country: India
- State: Haryana
- District: Bhiwani
- Tehsil: Tosham

Government
  - Body: Village panchayat

Population (2011)
  - Total: 1,882

Languages
  - Official: Hindi
- Time zone: UTC+5:30 (IST)

Chhapar Rangran is a village in the Tosham tehsil of the Bhiwani district in the Indian state of Haryana. Located approximately 33 kilometres (21 mi) north west of the district headquarters town of Bhiwani, as of the 2011 Census of India, the village had 374 households with a total population of 1,882 of which 1,011 were male and 871 female. maximum population is of Chandravansi Tanwar Rajput in the village. This village was established by Thakur Kishore Singh 276 years ago. His father's name was Thakur Gulab Singh. This village was a principality of 52 villages, historically named as Kishorgarh. There are many historical buildings like Fort (Garh), Shivalya, old well etc. made by Kishor Singh.

Even today, the stronghold and palace of Thakur Kishore Singh are present in the middle of the village. There were two queens of Kishore Singh. The elder queen was from Jaisalmer (Rajasthan) and the second queen was from Talwandi (Haryana). The sons of the elder queen settled many villages. The village Shungarpur, Badalwala are extended from of this village. Tanwar families of this village are also settled in Hetampura, Pilkhua (Uttar Pradesh). The younger queen had two sons - Bhodu Singh and Bhojraj Singh, whose children are settled in this village.

In today's era, President (Kshatriya Mahasabha, Rajput Ekta Manch, Sarvajatiya Sangharsh Samiti) Vedpal Tanwar is one of them.For political representational purposes the village is part of Tosham Assembly constituency and the Bhiwani-Mahendragarh Lok Sabha constituency.
