= Rupgarh, Bhiwani =

Coordinates: 28.687°N 76.126°E

Rupgarh is a village in the Bhiwani district of the Indian state of Haryana. It lies approximately 13 kilometres (8.1 mi) south of the district headquarters town of Bhiwani. As of the 2011 Census of India, the village had 486 households with a population of 2,599 of which 1,333 were male and 1,266 female.For political representational purposes the village is part of Bhiwani Assembly constituency and the Bhiwani-Mahendragarh Lok Sabha constituency.
