= Chhapar Jogian =

- Village
- Location in Haryana, India Chhapar Jogian (India)
- Coordinates: 28.8649°N 75.7931°E
- Country: India
- State: Haryana
- District: Bhiwani
- Tehsil: Tosham

Government
  - Body: Village panchayat

Population (2011)
  - Total: 1,192

Languages
  - Official: Hindi
- Time zone: UTC+5:30 (IST)

Chhapar Jogian is a village in the Tosham tehsil of the Bhiwani district in the Indian state of Haryana. Located approximately 34 kilometres (21 mi) north west of the district headquarters town of Bhiwani, as of the 2011 Census of India, the village had 224 households with a total population of 1,192 of which 637 were male and 555 female.For political representational purposes the village is part of Tosham Assembly constituency and the Bhiwani-Mahendragarh Lok Sabha constituency.
