= Saral, Bhiwani =

Saral
- Village
- Location in Haryana, India Saral (India)
- Coordinates: 28.8471°N 75.8465°E
- Country: India
- State: Haryana
- District: Bhiwani
- Tehsil: Tosham
- Founder: dhank Khundia gotra and jat Sura Gotra People

Government
  - Body: Village panchayat

Population (2011)
  - Total: 12,979

Languages
  - Official: Hindi
- Time zone: UTC+5:30 (IST)

Saral is a village in the Tosham tehsil of the Bhiwani district in the Indian state of Haryana. Located approximately 28 kilometres (17 mi) west of the district headquarters town of Bhiwani, as of the 2011 Census of India, the village had 599 households with a total population of 3,045 of which 1,624 were male and 1,421 female. For political representational purposes the village is part of Tosham Assembly constituency and the Bhiwani-Mahendragarh Lok Sabha constituency.
