= Riwasa =

- Location within Haryana Location within India
- Coordinates: 28.8213°N 75.9529°E
- Country: India
- State: Haryana
- District: Bhiwani
- Tehsil: Tosham

Population (2011)
  - Total: 6,328
- Time zone: UTC+5:30 (IST)
- PIN: 127 xxx
- Postal code: 127040
- Vehicle registration: HR
- Website: www.bhiwani.nic.in

Riwasa is a village in Tosham tehsil of the Bhiwani District in Haryana, North India. It lies 23.0 kilometres (14.3 mi) from Bhiwani on the left of the Bhiwani-Tosham road (MDR).As of the 2011 Census of India, the village had 1,168 households with a total population of 6,328 of which 3,333 were male and 2,995 female.For political representational purposes the village is part of Tosham Assembly constituency and the Bhiwani-Mahendragarh Lok Sabha constituency.

== Adjacent villages ==
- Dhani Riwasa, Dhani Biran, Biran, Dhani Mahu
- Dinod
- Kairu
- Bapora
- Tosham
- Dharan
- Nigana Khurd
- Nigana Kalan
- Mahu ki Dhani
