= Mundhal Khurd =

Panna in Mundhal, Haryana, India

Mundhal Kh. Khurd Khurd
- Panna
- Mundhal Kh.
- Nickname: Khurd
- Location in Haryana, India Mundhal Kh. (India)
- Coordinates: 28.980°N 76.195°E
- Country: India
- State: Haryana
- District: Bhiwani
- Tehsil: Bhiwani

Government
  - Body: Part of village panchayat

Population (2017)
  - Total: 30,000

Languages
  - Official: Hindi
- Time zone: UTC+5:30 (IST)

Mundhal Khurd is a panna of Mundhal in the Bhiwani district of the Indian state of Haryana. It lies approximately 27 kilometres (17 mi) north of the district headquarters town of Bhiwani. As of the 2011 Census of India, it had 1828 households, with a total population of 8,837, comprising 4,716 males and 4,121 females. Mundhal Khurd, earlier a separate habitation, is now contiguous to Mundhal Kalan, and both are collectively known as "Mundhal". Khurd and Kalan are words that indicate the main (Khurd) and smaller satellite extension (Kalan) of a town, village or settlement.For political representational purposes the village is part of Bawani Khera Assembly constituency and the Bhiwani-Mahendragarh Lok Sabha constituency.

== See also ==
- Administrative divisions of Haryana
- List of districts of Haryana
