= Chang, Bhiwani =

Chang
- Village
- Location in Haryana, India Chang (India)
- Coordinates: 28.8808°N 76.2427°E
- Country: India
- State: Haryana
- District: Bhiwani
- Tehsil: Bhiwani
- Established: 1310(vikrmisamvat)
- Founder: Jait singh parmar

Government
  - Type: Haryana Govt.
  - Body: Village panchayat

Population (2011)
  - Total: 12,979

Languages
  - Official: Hindi
- Time zone: UTC+5:30 (IST)
- PIN: 127027

Chang is a village in Bhiwani district in the Indian state of Haryana. It lies approximately 14 kilometres (8.7 mi) north east of the district headquarters, Bhiwani.

As of the 2011 Census of India, the village had 2,595 households with a population of 12,979 of which 6,961 were male and 6,018 female. For political representational purposes the village is part of Bawani Khera Assembly constituency and the Bhiwani-Mahendragarh Lok Sabha constituency.

== Economy ==
Chang has developed agricultural and industrial sectors and is known for fishing, horticulture, dairy farming and other segments. It is a hub for workers in factories, in the fields, and in markets.

== History ==
Villagers served as freedom fighters. About 500 village boys serve in the Indian military.
