= Pahladgarh =

- Village
- Nickname: village
- Location in Haryana, India Pahladgarh (India)
- Coordinates: 28.737°N 76.129°E
- Country: India
- State: Haryana
- District: Bhiwani
- Tehsil: Bhiwani
- Established: 1700

Government
  - Type: panchayat
  - Body: Village panchayat

Population (2011)
  - Total: 5,286

Languages
  - Official: Hindi
- Time zone: UTC+5:30 (IST)
- PIN: 127309

Pahladgarh is a village in the Bhiwani district of the Indian state of Haryana. It lies approximately 6 kilometres (3.7 mi) south of the district headquarters town of Bhiwani. As of the 2011 Census of India, the village had 2,168 households and a total population of 5,286 of which 3,209 were male and 2,506 female. The total area of the village is 638 hectares (6.38 km^{2}).For political representational purposes the village is part of Bhiwani Assembly constituency and the Bhiwani-Mahendragarh Lok Sabha constituency.
