= Ninan, Haryana =

Ninan
- Village
- Location in Haryana, India Ninan (India)
- Coordinates: 28.784°N 76.183°E
- Country: India
- State: Haryana
- District: Bhiwani
- Tehsil: Bhiwani

Government
  - Body: Village panchayat

Population (2011)
  - Total: 1,594

Languages
  - Official: Hindi
- Time zone: UTC+5:30 (IST)

Ninan is a village in the Bhiwani district of the Indian state of Haryana. It lies approximately 4 kilometres (2.5 mi) east of the district headquarters town of Bhiwani. As of the 2011 Census of India, the village had 293 households with a total population of 1,594 of which 836 were male and 758 female.For political representational purposes the village is part of Bawani Khera Assembly constituency and the Hisar Lok Sabha constituency.
