= Bamla =

- Village
- Location in Haryana, India Bamla (India)
- Coordinates: 28.805°N 76.245°E
- Country: India
- State: Haryana
- District: Bhiwani
- Tehsil: Bhiwani

Government
  - Body: Village panchayat

Population (2011)
  - Total: 10,859

Languages
  - Official: Hindi
- Time zone: UTC+5:30 (IST)
- PIN: 127114
- Vehicle registration: HR 16

Bamla is a village in the Bhiwani district of the Indian state of Haryana. It lies approximately 11 kilometres (6.8 mi) east of the district headquarters town of Bhiwani. As of the 2011 Census of India, the village had 2,143 households with a population of 10,859 of which 5,943 were male and 4,916 female. For political representational purposes the village is part of Bhiwani Assembly constituency and the Bhiwani-Mahendragarh Lok Sabha constituency.
