= Ramupura, Bhiwani =

- Village
- Interactive map of Ramupura, Bhiwani

Population
  - Total: 1,977

Ramupura is a village in the Bhiwani district of the Indian state of Haryana. It lies approximately 11 kilometres (6.8 mi) north west of the district headquarters town of Bhiwani. As of the 2011 Census of India, the village had 367 households with a population of 1,977 of which 1,056 were male and 921 female.For political representational purposes the village is part of Bawani Khera Assembly constituency and the Hisar Lok Sabha constituency.

== Temples ==
- Shiv Temple
- Hanuman Temple
- Baba Takiya Temple
