= Baganwala =

- village
- Location in Haryana, India Baganwala (India)
- Coordinates: 28°52′31″N 75°53′14″E
- Country: India
- State: Haryana
- District: Bhiwani
- Tehsil: Tosham

Population (2011)
  - Total: 3,543

Languages
  - Official: Hindi
- Time zone: UTC+5:30 (IST)
- ISO 3166 code: IN-HR
- Vehicle registration: HR-48
- Nearest city: Tosham
- Lok Sabha constituency: Bhiwani
- Climate: hot & dry (Köppen)
- Avg. summer temperature: 45 °C (113 °F)
- Avg. winter temperature: 10 °C (50 °F)
- Website: haryana.gov.in

Baganwala is a village in the Bhiwani district of the Indian state of Haryana. Part of the Tosham tehsil and legislative assembly constituency, as of the 2011 Census of India, the village had 690 households with a total population of 3,543 of which 1,914 were male and 1,629 female.For political representational purposes the village is part of Tosham Assembly constituency and the Bhiwani-Mahendragarh Lok Sabha constituency.
