= Ratera, Bhiwani =

Village in Haryana, India

- Village
- Interactive map of Ratera, Bhiwani
- Coordinates: 28.959°N 75.881°E

Population
  - Total: 5,572

Ratera is a village in the Bhiwani district of the Indian state of Haryana. Its old name is Ratangarh. It lies approximately 38 kilometres (24 mi) from district headquarters Bhiwani.

== Demographics ==
As of the 2011 Census of India, the village had 1,039 households with a population of 5,572 of which 2,923 were male and 2,649 female.For political representational purposes the village is part of Bawani Khera Assembly constituency and the Hisar Lok Sabha constituency.

== Culture ==
It has two temples and one gurdwara.

== Transport ==
The nearest railway stations are: Hansi-17km, Bawani khera-18km, Hisar-30km, and Bhiwani-38km.
