= Sumra Khera =

Coordinates: 28.897°N 76.050°E

Sumra Kera is a village in the Bhiwani district of the Indian state of Haryana. It lies approximately 18 kilometres (11 mi) north west of the district headquarters town of Bhiwani. As of the 2011 Census of India, the village had 165 households with a population of 1176 and 875 voters of which 474 were male and 401 female.For political representational purposes the village is part of Bawani Khera Assembly constituency and the Hisar Lok Sabha constituency.
