= Taga, Bhiwani =

Coordinates: 28.855°N 76.070°E

Taga is a village in the Bhiwani district of the Indian state of Haryana. It lies approximately 9 kilometres (5.6 mi) north west of the district headquarters town of Bhiwani. As of the 2011 Census of India, the village had nine households with a population of 45, of which 23 were male and 22 were female.For political representational purposes the village is part of Bawani Khera Assembly constituency and the Hisar Lok Sabha constituency.
