= Nimari, Bhiwani =

Village in Bhiwani, Haryana, India

Coordinates: 28.795°N 76.320°E

Nimari, also spelt Neemri or Nimri, is a village in the Bhiwani district of the Indian state of Haryana. It lies approximately 22 kilometres (14 mi) east of the district headquarters town of Bhiwani. Nimari village is in the UTC 5.30 time zone and follows Indian standard time (IST). The local sunrise time varies 25 minutes from IST. The nearest railway station is Kharak Kalan (6 km). There is one government school in Haryana up to 10th standard and three other private schools. A govt college, hospital, market, bank and postal service are also available in the nearby town Baund Kalan (2 km from Nimari). A local temple is dedicated to the local deity, Dada Devta. Shiva and Gorakhnath are other deities having their own dedicated temples in the outer area of village. According to Census 2011 information, the location code or village code of Neemri village is 061460. As per 2009 stats, Nimri is the gram panchayat of Neemri village.

The total geographical area of village is 395 hectares. Neemri has a total population of 2,072. There are about 403 houses in Neemri village. As per 2019 stats, Neemri villages comes under Dadri assembly and Bhiwani-Mahendragarh parliamentary constituency. Bondkala is nearest town to Neemri. The female to male ratio of the village is 894/1000.
