= Bohal =

Bohal may refer to:

- Bohal, Morbihan, France
- Bohal, Bhiwani, India
- Bohal, Iran
