= Kelanga, Bhiwani =

Kalinga Kalinga
- Village
- Location in Haryana, India Kalinga (India)
- Coordinates: 28.8700°N 76.3285°E
- Country: India
- State: Haryana
- District: Bhiwani
- Tehsil: Bhiwani

Government
  - Body: Village panchayat

Population (2011)
  - Total: 13,910

Languages
  - Official: Hindi
- Time zone: UTC+5:30 (IST)
- PIN: 127114

Kelanga (Kalinga) is a village in the Bhiwani district of the Indian state of Haryana. It lies approximately 20 kilometres (12 mi) north east of the district headquarters town of Bhiwani. As of the 2011 Census of India, the village had 2,628 households with a population of 13,910 of which 7,404 were male and 6,506 female. The village is divided in 3 sections(Pana) namely - Sawai Pana, Raju Pana, Amru Pana, with each pana having its own panchayat. The village has 3 government schools, 01 Ayurvedic Hospital, 01 Animal Hospital and one post office. The village has a literacy rate of 72.62%. The male literacy rate stands at 80.82% while the female literacy rate is 63.32%.For political representational purposes the village is part of Bawani Khera Assembly constituency and the Hisar Lok Sabha constituency.

Freedom fighter Pandit Nekiram Sharma hailed from this village. Villagers worship Baba Guga, Devi Maa, Sati Dadi, Baba Mauni Dev. President A.P.J Abdul kalam visited the village of Kalinga on 25 May 2007. As a result, the village saw significant growth. The Village had been declared "Adarsh gaon" from central government. Youth of this village have a great craze to join the defense forces, with many youngsters being selected in the Army, Navy and Airforce every year.
