= Kalod =

- Interactive map of Kalod

Population
  - Total: 4,500

Kalod is a village located in Siwani Tehsil and Bhiwani District in the Indian state of Haryana. It is located 12 km from Siwani Tehsil and 55 km from District Headquarters.

== Demographics ==
As per the 2011 census the population of the village is close to 4,500 including 2200 voters. For political representational purposes the village is part of Loharu Assembly constituency and the Bhiwani-Mahendragarh Lok Sabha constituency.

== Economy ==
The village is mainly dependent on farming. 80% of its population work in agriculture, many rearing cattle and buffalo. Many people of the village have contributed to the service of the country and have served in the Indian Army. Many people work in different cities.

== Culture ==
People of many castes live in the village, including Raw, Brahmin, Pilania, Babal, Mantri, Saharan, Khati and Kumhar, Raw.

== Education ==
Kalod has 3 government schools .One Private school named Gyan Yog Vidhya Mandir Senior Secondary School

== See also ==
- List of villages in Bhiwani district
