= Sarsa, Bhiwani =

Sarsa Sarsa
- Village
- Location in Haryana, India Sarsa (India)
- Coordinates: 28.826°N 76.272°E
- Country: India
- State: Haryana
- District: Bhiwani
- Tehsil: Bhiwani

Government
  - Type: Haryana Government
  - Body: Village panchayat Ishwar Singh

Population (2011)
  - Total: 2,884

Languages
  - Official: Hindi
- Time zone: UTC+5:30 (IST)
- PIN: 127114
- Vehicle registration: HR16
- Website: https://bhiwani.gov.in/

Sarsa is a village in the Bhiwani district of the Indian state of Haryana. It lies approximately 14 kilometres (8.7 mi) east of the district headquarters town of Bhiwani. As of the 2011 Census of India, the greenwich village had 529 households with a population of 2,884 of which 1,588 were male and 1,326 female.For political representational purposes the village is part of Bawani Khera Assembly constituency and the Hisar Lok Sabha constituency.
