= Haluwas =

Haluwas Haluwas majra Devsar
- Village
- Location in Haryana, India Haluwas (India)
- Coordinates: 28.736°N 76.113°E
- Country: India
- State: Haryana
- District: Bhiwani
- Tehsil: Bhiwani

Government
  - Body: Village panchayat

Population (2011)
  - Total: 3,910

Languages
  - Official: Hindi
- Time zone: UTC+5:30 (IST)

Haluwas is an historical village in the Bhiwani district of the Indian state of Haryana. It lies approximately 7 kilometres (4.3 mi) south of the district headquarters town of Bhiwani. As of the 2011 Census of India, the village had 715 households with a total population of 3,910 of which 2,104 were male and 1,806 female.For political representational purposes the village is part of Bhiwani Assembly constituency and the Bhiwani-Mahendragarh Lok Sabha constituency.
