= Sui, Bhiwani =

Coordinates: 28.861°N 76.061°E

Sui is a village in the Bhiwani district of the Indian state of Haryana. It lies approximately 11 kilometres (6.8 mi) northwest of the district headquarters town of Bhiwani. As of the 2011 Census of India, the village had 930 households with a population of 5,063, of which 2,677 were male and 2,386 were female.For political representational purposes the village is part of Bawani Khera Assembly constituency and the Hisar Lok Sabha constituency.
