= Biran, Bhiwani =

- Location within Haryana Location within India
- Coordinates: 28.829652°N 76.008726°E
- Country: India

Government
  - Body: Village panchayat

Population (2011)
  - Total: 5,088
- Time zone: UTC+5:30 (IST)
- PIN: 127 111
- Website: www.bhiwani.nic.in

Biran is a village in Tosham tehsil of Bhiwani district in the Indian state of Haryana. It lies 13.9 kilometres (8.6 mi) north west of the district headquarters Bhiwani on the Bhiwani-Tosham road (MDR) and has a pincode of 127111.

== Demographics ==
As of the 2011 Census of India, Biran had a population of 5,088 living in 1007 households. Males (2,676) constitute more than 52.59% of the population and females (2,412) 47.4%. Biran had a total of 3,433 literates giving an average literacy rate of 67.47%, which is lower than the national average of 74%. Male literacy was 60.58% (2080), and female literacy 39.41% (1,353). In Biran, 10.96% or 558 individuals were under six years of age .For political representational purposes the village is part of Tosham Assembly constituency and the Bhiwani-Mahendragarh Lok Sabha constituency.
