= Dhani Miran =

Coordinates: 28°52′N 75°42′E

Dhani Miran is a small village of Tosham Tehsil, Bhiwani District, Haryana. The village is 45 km from its district capital, and is situated on Tosham Siwani road. For political representational purposes the village is part of Loharu Assembly constituency and the Bhiwani-Mahendragarh Lok Sabha constituency.

== See also ==
- List of villages in Bhiwani district
