= Pur, Bhiwani =

Pur
- Nickname: (Purya)
- Location within Haryana Location within India
- Coordinates: 28.9515°N 76.0906°E
- Country: India
- State: Haryana
- District: Bhiwani
- Tehsil: Bawani Khera
- Founder: Ganesh/Deepanshu

Government
  - Body: Village panchayat

Population (2011)
  - Total: 6,961

Languages
  - De facto: Haryanvi
- Time zone: UTC+5:30 (IST)
- PIN: 127032

Pur is a village in the Bawani Khera tehsil of Bhiwani district in the Indian state of Haryana. It lies on the border with Hisar district, 20 kilometres (12 mi) north of the district headquarters at Bhiwani, 6 kilometres (3.7 mi) west of Bawani Khera and around 240 kilometres (150 mi) from the state capital Chandigarh.

== Demographics ==
As of the 2011 Census of India, the village had 1,248 households with a total population of 6,961 of which 3,682 were male and 3,279 female.For political representational purposes the village is part of Bawani Khera Assembly constituency and the Hisar Lok Sabha constituency.

== History ==
Over the following decades, the settlement expanded as additional households were established around the original habitation site. Generations descending from the early Tanwar lineage—locally recalled through names such as Bagdi, Agdi, Prahlad and Dharampal—are regarded as having contributed to the early socio-agricultural development of the village.

During the 19th and early 20th centuries, Pur gradually integrated into the administrative framework of Bawani Khera tehsil and the wider agrarian economy of the Bhiwani district. Despite modern development, the village retains cultural and architectural elements that reflect its early formation and long-standing oral history.

== Temples ==
- Sri Hanuman Mandir
- Sri Ram Mandir
- Sri Goga Ji Maharaj Mandir
- Shiv Mandir
- Paramhans Baba Harihar Mandir
- Durga Mata Mandir
- Baba Lal mandir
- Guru Ravidas Mandir
- Bhya Duj Mandir
- Saiyad Baba Mazar
- Baba Bhairav Mandir (Dera)
