= Paposa =

Coordinates: 28.976°N 75.980°E

Paposa is a village in the Bhiwani district of the Indian state of Haryana. About 98% Jat population of the village paposa are ghanghas. In nearby villages, Paposa is known as Jaatland Village. It lies approximately 25 kilometres (16 mi) north west of the district headquarters town of Bhiwani. As of the 2011 Census of India, the village had 741 households with a population of 3,731 of which 2,021 were male and 1,710 female.For political representational purposes the village is part of Bawani Khera Assembly constituency and the Hisar Lok Sabha constituency.
