= Nathuwas =

- Village
- Location in Haryana, India
- Coordinates: 28.808°N 76.183°E
- Country: India
- State: Haryana
- District: Bhiwani
- Tehsil: Bhiwani

Government
  - Body: Village panchayat

Population (2011)
  - Total: 2,641

Languages
  - Official: Hindi
- Time zone: UTC+5:30 (IST)

Nathuwas is a village in the Bhiwani district of the Indian state of Haryana. It lies approximately 5 kilometres (3.1 mi) east of the district headquarters town of Bhiwani. As of the 2011 Census of India, the village had 492 households with a total population of 2,641 of which 1,440 were male and 1,201 female.For political representational purposes the village is part of Bawani Khera Assembly constituency and the Hisar Lok Sabha constituency.

Nathuwas has two schools, primary school runs in a separate building and senior secondary school run in a bigger building and total 400+ students are studying here including students from nearby villages.

In the recent developments, Nutangram Library was opened on 23 April 2017 under the aegis of Nutangram Foundation.The purpose of the Library is to emphasize and increase reading skills and student's desire to read and learn.
