= Golagarh, Bhiwani =

Coordinates: 28°38′54″N 75°58′17″E

Golagarh is a village in Bhiwani district of the Indian state of Haryana. It lies approximately 24 kilometres south west of the district headquarters town of Bhiwani. As of the 2011 Census of India, the village had 536 households with a population of 2,836 of which 1,485 were male and 1,351 female. For political representation, the village falls under the Tosham Vidhan Sabha (Assembly) constituency and the Bhiwani-Mahendragarh Lok Sabha (Parliamentary) constituency.

== Notable individuals ==
- Bansi Lal
- Ranbir Singh Mahendra
- Anirudh Chaudhry
