= Phulpura, Haryana =

Village in Haryana, India

Coordinates: 28°48′40″N 76°16′07″E

Phulpura, or Phoolpura is a small village in Bhiwani district, in the Indian state of Haryana. The village is 12 km east of Bhiwani on the road to Rohtak. The villagers' main source of income is farming and labouring in the factories (called bhatta in the country). The village has one panchayat which includes one sarpanch and 7 panches.For political representational purposes the village is part of Bhiwani Assembly constituency and the Bhiwani-Mahendragarh Lok Sabha constituency.
