= Biran =

Biran may refer to:

== People ==
- Avraham Biran (born 1909–2008), Israeli archaeologist
- Dror Biran (born 1977), Israeli pianist
- Itamar Biran (born 1998), Israeli alpine ski racer
- Jonathan Biran (born 1966), American judge
- Maine de Biran (born 1766–1824), French philosopher
- Michal Biran (born 1978), Israeli politician
- Misbach Yusa Biran (born 1933–2012), Indonesian writer
- Paul Biran (born 1969), Israeli mathematician
- Shahar Biran (born 1998), Israeli tennis player
- Shergo Biran (born 1979), German football player

== Places ==
- Birán, a town in Cuba
- Biran Gali Union Council, a Union Council in Khyber Pakhtunkhwa, Pakistan
- Biran, Gers, a commune of France in the Gers department
- Biran, Iran, a village in West Azerbaijan Province, Iran
- Biran, Bhiwani a village in the Bhiwani District of the Indian state of Haryana

== Other ==
- Biran tree, the Wild Mangosteen (Garcinia indica)
- Biran languages

== See also ==
- Birun
