= Umrawat, Bhiwani =

Umrawat
- Village
- Location in Haryana, India Umrawat (India)
- Coordinates: 28.7692°N 76.1847°E
- Country: India
- State: Haryana
- District: Bhiwani
- Tehsil: Bhiwani

Government
  - Body: Village panchayat

Population (2011)
  - Total: 2,781

Languages
  - Official: Hindi
- Time zone: UTC+5:30 (IST)

Umrawat is a village in the Bhiwani district of the Indian state of Haryana. It lies approximately 8.5 kilometres (5.3 mi) south east of the district headquarters town of Bhiwani. As of the 2011 Census of India, the village had 510 households with a population of 2,781 of which 1,520 were male and 1,261 female, First CMA of Village Mukesh and Rakesh s/o Shri Bhagwan Sharma and Parveen Dutt Sharma(CMA Topper), The First Railway Employee of Village is Munesh Kaushik s/o Shri Bhagwan Sharma, Senior Train Manager (Bhiwani Junction).For political representational purposes the village is part of Bhiwani Assembly constituency and the Bhiwani-Mahendragarh Lok Sabha constituency.
