= Rajpura Kharkari =

- Village
- Location in Haryana, India Rajpura Kharkari (India)
- Coordinates: 28°49′43″N 76°06′29″E
- Country: India
- State: Haryana
- District: Bhiwani
- Tehsil: Bhiwani

Government
  - Body: Village panchayat

Population (2011)
  - Total: 1,124

Languages
  - Official: Hindi
- Time zone: UTC+5:30 (IST)

Rajpura Kharkari is a village in the Bhiwani district of the Indian state of Haryana. It lies approximately 2.5 kilometres (1.6 mi) north west of the district headquarters town of Bhiwani. As of the 2011 Census of India, the village had 233 households with a total population of 1,124 of which 602 were male and 522 female.For political representational purposes the village is part of Tosham Assembly constituency and the Bhiwani-Mahendragarh Lok Sabha constituency.
