= Jui Khurd =

- Village
- Location in Haryana, India Jui Khurd (India)
- Coordinates: 28.6338°N 75.9418°E
- Country: India
- State: Haryana
- District: Bhiwani
- Tehsil: Bhiwani

Government
  - Body: Village panchayat

Population (2011)
  - Total: 6,821

Languages
  - Official: Hindi
- Time zone: UTC+5:30 (IST)
- PIN: 127030

Jui Khurd is a village in the Bhiwani district of the Indian state of Haryana. It lies approximately 27 kilometres (17 mi) south west of the district headquarters town of Bhiwani. As of the 2011 Census of India, the village had 1,303 households with a total population of 6,821 of which 3,631 were male and 3,208 female. Ex chief minister Ch. Bansi Lal got his primary education here. BCCCI president Ranbir Singh Mahendra also got study in Jui.

For political representational purposes the village is part of Tosham Assembly constituency and the Bhiwani-Mahendragarh Lok Sabha constituency.
