= Kaunt =

- Village
- Location in Haryana, India Kaunt (India)
- Coordinates: 28.776°N 76.176°E
- Country: India
- State: Haryana
- District: Bhiwani
- Mandal: Bhiwani

Population (2011)
  - Total: 4,017

Languages
  - Official: Hindi
- Time zone: UTC+5:30 (IST)

Kaunt is a village in Bhiwani district of Indian state of Haryana. It lies approximately 5 kilometres (3.1 mi) south east of the district headquarters town of Bhiwani and just 2km from new bus stand bhiwani. It was settled by an old man from Sisai village in Hisar. It's a village of Kaliraman Jats. The village is the origin of Ahri village in Jhajjar. As of the 2011 Census of India, the village had 749 households with a total population of 4,017 of which 2,143 were male and 1,874 female.For political representational purposes the village is part of Bhiwani Assembly constituency and the Bhiwani-Mahendragarh Lok Sabha constituency.
