= Rewari Khera, Bhiwani =

Rewari Khera
- Village
- Location in Haryana, India Rewari Khera (India)
- Coordinates: 28.846°N 76.252°E
- Country: India
- State: Haryana
- District: Bhiwani
- Tehsil: Bhiwani

Government
  - Body: Village panchayat

Population (2011)
  - Total: 4,924

Languages
  - Official: Hindi
- Time zone: UTC+5:30 (IST)

Rewari Khera is a village in the Bhiwani district of the Indian state of Haryana. It lies approximately 12 kilometres (7.5 mi) north east of the district headquarters town of Bhiwani. As of the 2011 Census of India, the village had 922 households with a population of 4,924 of which 2,588 were male and 2,336 female.

The village is known for its agriculture-based economy, with the majority of the villagers engaged in farming (Government of Haryana, 2021). It is well-connected to the nearby towns and cities through a network of roads and highways. The nearest town to Rewari Khera is Bawani Khera, which is about 10 kilometers away (Google Maps, n.d.). The village also has a railway station, which is located on the Delhi-Fazilka line (Indian Railways, n.d.).

Rewari Khera has a rich cultural heritage and is known for its vibrant folk traditions. The villagers celebrate various festivals throughout the year, such as Holi, Diwali, and Baisakhi (The Times of India, 2022).

In recent years, the village has seen some development initiatives taken by the government. The village was declared a "smart village" under the Haryana government's Smartgram Yojana in 2018 (The Hindu, 2018). The initiative aimed to provide basic amenities such as electricity, water supply, and sanitation facilities to the village.For political representational purposes the village is part of Bawani Khera Assembly constituency and the Hisar Lok Sabha constituency.
