= Siwara, Bhiwani =

Siwara
- Village
- Nickname: Siwara
- Location within Haryana Location within India
- Coordinates: 28.9722°N 76.1014°E
- Country: India
- State: Haryana
- District: Bhiwani
- Tehsil: Bawani Khera

Government
  - Type: Elected
  - Body: Village panchayat

Population (2011)
  - Total: 4,176
- Time zone: UTC+5:30 (IST)

Siwara is a village in the Bawani Khera tehsil of the Bhiwani district in the Indian state of Haryana. It lies approximately 19 kilometres (12 mi) north of the district headquarters town of Bhiwani. As of the 2011 Census of India, the village had 760 households with a population of 4,176 of which 2,211 were male and 1,965 female.For political representational purposes the village is part of Bawani Khera Assembly constituency and the Hisar Lok Sabha constituency.
