= Sai, Bhiwani =

Sai
- Village
- Location in Haryana, India Sai (India)
- Coordinates: 28.926°N 76.207°E
- Country: India
- State: Haryana
- District: Bhiwani
- Tehsil: Bhiwani

Government
  - Body: Village panchayat

Population (2011)
  - Total: 6,080

Languages
  - Official: Hindi
- Time zone: UTC+5:30 (IST)

Sai is a village in the Bhiwani district of the Indian state of Haryana. It lies approximately 17 kilometres (11 mi) north east of the district headquarters town of Bhiwani. As of the 2011 Census of India, the village had 1,141 households with a population of 6,080 of which 3,241 were male and 2,839 female.For political representational purposes the village is part of Bawani Khera Assembly constituency and the Hisar Lok Sabha constituency.
