= Lohari Jatu =

Village in India

Coordinates: 28.904°N 76.079°E

Lohari Jattu is a village in the Bhiwani district of the Indian state of Haryana. It lies approximately 13 kilometres (8.1 mi) north of the district headquarters town of Bhiwani. As of the 2011 Census of India, the village had 1,630 households with a population of 8,971, of which 4,631 were male and 4,340 female.For political representational purposes the village is part of Bawani Khera Assembly constituency and the Hisar Lok Sabha constituency.
