= Dhab Dhani =

Dhab Dhani Baba balak daas dham
- Village
- Nickname: Monu swami
- Location in Haryana, India Dhab Dhani (India)
- Coordinates: 28.6372°N 75.8964°E
- Country: India
- State: Haryana
- District: Bhiwani
- Tehsil: Bhiwani
- Established: 1882
- Founder: Jallan & Family

Government
  - Body: Village panchayat

Population (2011)
  - Total: 2,954

Languages
  - Official: Hindi
- Time zone: UTC+5:30 (IST)
- PIN: 127030
- Vehicle registration: HR16

Dhab Dhani is a village in the Bhiwani district of the Indian state of Haryana. It lies approximately 29 kilometres (18 mi) south west of the district headquarters town of Bhiwani. As of the 2011 Census of India, the village had 522 households with a total population of 2,954 of which 1,564 were male and 1,390 female. Nearby villages include Kairu, Dhigawa mandi, Dewrala and Jui Khurd.For political representational purposes the village is part of Tosham Assembly constituency and the Bhiwani-Mahendragarh Lok Sabha constituency.

== Education ==
There is one government senior secondary school/primary school and two other Private schools.1.M.D.S Vidya Niketan.
