= Kohar, Bhiwani district =

Kohar
- Village
- Location in Haryana, India Kohar (India)
- Coordinates: 28.799°N 76.017°E
- Country: India
- State: Haryana
- District: Bhiwani
- Mandal: Bhiwani

Government
  - Body: Village panchayat

Population (2011)
  - Total: 5,242

Languages
  - Official: Hindi
- Time zone: UTC+5:30 (IST)

Kohar is a village in the Bhiwani district of the Indian state of Haryana. It lies approximately 14 kilometres (8.7 mi) west of the district headquarters town of Bhiwani. As of the 2011 Census of India, the village had 980 households with a total population of 5,242 of which 2,746 were male and 2,496 female.For political representational purposes the village is part of Tosham Assembly constituency and the Bhiwani-Mahendragarh Lok Sabha constituency.
