= Kharak Kalan =

- Village
- Location in Haryana, India Kharak Kalan (India)
- Coordinates: 28.807°N 76.314°E
- Country: India
- State: Haryana
- District: Bhiwani
- Tehsil: Bhiwani

Government
  - Body: Village panchayat

Population (2011)
  - Total: 12,605

Languages
  - Official: Hindi
- Time zone: UTC+5:30 (IST)
- PIN: 127114
- Vehicle registration: [HR 16H]

Kharak Kalan is a village in the Bhiwani district of the Indian state of Haryana. It lies approximately 17 kilometres (11 mi) east of the district headquarters town of Bhiwani. As of the 2011 Census of India, the village had 2,444 households with a population of 12,605 of which 6,697 were male and 5,908 female.For political representational purposes the village is part of Bawani Khera Assembly constituency and the Bhiwani-Mahendragarh Lok Sabha constituency.

Dadi Sati Jabade is the primary deity here, and the residents and visitors alike rejoice in the Basant Pachami Mela.

There are many other religious places like Dadi Sati Tara Devi, Dadi Chhabilende, Dadi kamalde Harsiddhi Devi, Khatu Shyam Temple, Jahar Veer Goga Ji Temple, Arya Samaj Temple, Ancient Shiva Temple, etc.

Kharak is also known as the city of saints. Famous Nāgepīra Bābā (नागेपीर बाबा), the most beloved disciple of Lord Shiva Gorakshanath, on whose name is the birthplace of Shri Ranpat and Mandhata. There are camps (डेरे) of mahatmas (saints) all around the village, where all sorrows and pains vanish.

Kharak Kalan has its own hospital run by the charitable trust 'Seth Phulchand Memorial'. The attractiveness of the village is enhanced by a large number of ponds. There are three main areas in this village, viz. Rajyan panaa, Khandan panaa, Mamnan panaa.

There are many other beautiful temples near Dadi Sati Jabde Temple.
