= Prem Nagar, Bhiwani =

Prem Nagar
- Village
- Nickname: khusro
- Location in Haryana, India Prem Nagar (India)
- Coordinates: 28.874°N 76.104°E
- Country: India
- State: Haryana
- District: Bhiwani
- Tehsil: Bhiwani

Government
  - Body: Village panchayat

Population (2011)
  - Total: 3,495

Languages
  - Official: Hindi, Haryanvi (local)
- Time zone: UTC+5:30 (IST)
- PIN: 127031

Prem Nagar is a village in Bhiwani district of the Indian state of Haryana. It lies approximately 9 kilometres (5.6 mi) north of the district headquarters town of Bhiwani. As of the 2011 Census of India, the village had 684 households and a population of 3,495 of which 1,849 were male and 1,646 female.For political representational purposes the village is part of Bawani Khera Assembly constituency and the Hisar Lok Sabha constituency.

The head (Sarpanch) of the village is Rajesh Bura.

In village the most famous temple is situated the name is shri Shri 1008 jai Baba Gulab nath and Baba Bhani Nath temple.
