= Kohar =

Kohar may refer to:

- Ajit Singh Kohar, Indian politician
- Kohar, Bhiwani district
- Kohar, Western Armenian variant of the Armenian feminine given name Gohar (Գոհար)
- KOHAR Symphony Orchestra and Choir
- Rajendra Kohar

== See also ==
- Kahar
- Khohar
