= Bhiwani Lohar =

- Village
- Location in Haryana, India Bhiwani Lohar (India)
- Coordinates: 28.7749°N 76.1810°E
- Country: India
- State: Haryana
- District: Bhiwani
- Tehsil: Bhiwani

Government
  - Body: Village panchayat

Population (2011)
  - Total: 4,087

Languages
  - Official: Hindi
- Time zone: UTC+5:30 (IST)

Bhiwani Lohar is a village in the Bhiwani district of the Indian state of Haryana. It lies approximately 5 kilometres (3.1 mi) south east of the district headquarters town of Bhiwani. As of the 2011 Census of India, the village had 641 households with a total population of 4,087 of which 2,505 were male and 1,582 female.
