= Dhareru =

Dhareru baba shayam ki nagari
- Dhara Nagari
- Location within Haryana Location within India
- Coordinates: 28.7365°N 76.2279°E
- Country: India

Government
  - Body: Village panchayat

Population (2011)
  - Total: 5,491
- Time zone: UTC+5:30 (IST)
- PIN: 127 309
- Telephone code: 127309
- Vehicle registration: HR 16, HR 61
- Website: www.bhiwani.nic.in

Dhareru is a village in Bhiwani Tehsil in the Bhiwani district of the Indian state of Haryana. Part of the Hisar division, it is located 14 kilometres (8.7 mi) east of the district headquarters of Bhiwani. It lies 13 kilometres (8.1 mi) from Bhiwani and 266 kilometres (165 mi) from the state capital, Chandigarh. Its primary post office is Dhareu.

== Demographics ==
Dhareru has a population of 8,425 and 1200 households. Males (4548) constitute 53.83% of the population and females (3877) 46.16%. Dhareru has an average literacy rate of 68%, which is lower than the national average of 74%; male literacy is 76% and female literacy is 47% of total literates. In Dhareru, 16% of the population is under 6 years of age.For political representational purposes the village is part of Bhiwani Assembly constituency and the Bhiwani-Mahendragarh Lok Sabha constituency.

== Adjacent villages ==
- Nangal (1.2 km)
- Badala (2 km)
- Manheru (3 km)
- Kayla (4 km)
- Sanga (3 km) are the nearby Villages to Dhareru.
- Umrawat (6 km) Near to bhiwani
- Kasni (8 km)

== Adjacent cities ==
- Bhiwani
- Charkhi Dadri
- Rohtak
- Jhajjar

Important Personalities:

- ved parkash sarpanch
- Praveen, Inspector of Income Tax, Dudu Family
- Bajrang Sarpanch, Tunda sarpanch
- Shankar Pahalwan
- Manish Dahiya Bouncer
- Bajrang Pahalwan, fauji
- Balram Fauji
