= Paluwas =

Paluwas Village
- Village
- Location in Haryana, India Paluwas Village (India)
- Coordinates: 28.805°N 76.167°E
- Country: India
- State: Haryana
- District: Bhiwani
- Tehsil: Bhiwani

Government
  - Body: Village panchayat

Population (2011)
  - Total: 7,370

Languages
  - Official: Hindi
- Time zone: UTC+5:30 (IST)
- PIN: 127021

Paluwas is a village in the Bhiwani district of the Indian state of Haryana. It lies approximately 4 kilometres (2.5 mi) east of the district headquarters town of Bhiwani. As of the 2011 Census of India, the village had 1,409 households with a total population of 7,370 of which 3,863 were male and 3,507 female.
