= Prem Nagar =

Prem Nagar may refer to:

== Cinema ==
- Prem Nagar (1940 film), an Indian Hindi-language film
- Prem Nagar (1974 film), an Indian Hindi-language film
- Prema Nagar, a 1971 Indian Telugu-language film

== Places ==
=== India ===
- Prem Nagar, Bhiwani, a village in Haryana, India
- Prem Nagar, Chhattisgarh, Chhattisgarh state, India
  - Premnagar Assembly constituency
- Prem Nagar Export Zone, an export zone for the brass industry in Moradabad, Uttar Pradesh, India
- Prem Nagar, Hyderabad, locality of Hyderabad, India
- Prem Nagar, Delhi, locality of Delhi, near Nangloi
  - Prem Nagar (Loni) metro station
- Prem Nagar metro station, of the Mumbai Metro in Mumbai, India

=== Pakistan ===
- Prem Nagar, Kasur, a village in Kasur District, Punjab, Pakistan
  - Prem Nagar railway station, railway station and site of a dry port in Kasur District
- Prem Nagar, Lahore, a neighbourhood in Lahore, Punjab, Pakistan

== See also ==
- Love City (disambiguation), literal translation of Prem Nagar
