= Devsar Dhaam =

Devsar Dham is a Hindu temple in the Bhiwani District of Haryana, India. It is dedicated to the deity Durga, and is located 7 kilometres away from Bhiwani Devsar Dham is a Hindu religious site traditionally associated with the worship of Lord Shiva, located approximately 7 kilometers from Bhiwani, and is known for its spiritual significance, serene surroundings, and role as a local center for religious observance, cultural continuity, and community gatherings..
