= Naurangabad, Bhiwani =

Naurangabad
- Village
- Location in Haryana, India Naurangabad (Haryana)
- Coordinates: 28.803°N 76.229°E
- Country: India
- State: Haryana
- District: Bhiwani
- Tehsil: Bhiwani

Government
  - Body: Village panchayat

Population (2011)
  - Total: 3,016

Languages
  - Official: Hindi
- Time zone: UTC+5:30 (IST)

Naurangabad, approximately 10 kilometres (6.2 mi) east of Bhiwani city on NH-709, is a village in the Bhiwani district of Haryana state of India.

== Etymology ==
Naurangabad was known as Nakanagar during the 1st to 3rd century CE Yaudheya Republic according to a seal found from this site.

== History ==
59 acres ancient archaeological mound, with historical period including Yaudheya, Indo-Greek, Kushana and Gupta Empire periods, has produced large number of coins, coin-moulds, seals. A fortified mud brick and baked brick township of Yaudheya period was found here. Artifacts excavated from here are displayed at museum at Gurukul Jhajjar.

== Demography ==
As of the 2011 Census of India, the village had 553 households with a total population of 3,016 of which 1,633 were male and 1,383 female. For political representational purposes the village is part of Bhiwani Assembly constituency and the Bhiwani-Mahendragarh Lok Sabha constituency.

== See also ==
- List of Indus Valley Civilisation sites
- History of Haryana
- Tourism in Haryana
