= Kapoor Singh =

Indian politician

Member of Haryana Legislative Assembly
- Incumbent
- Assumed office 8 October 2024
- Preceded by: Bishamber Singh
- Constituency: Bawani Khera

Personal details
- Party: Bharatiya Janata Party
- Profession: Politician

Kapoor Singh is an Indian politician from Haryana. He is a Member of the Haryana Legislative Assembly from 2024, representing Bawani Khera Assembly constituency as a Member of the Bharatiya Janata Party.

== See also ==
- 2024 Haryana Legislative Assembly election
- Haryana Legislative Assembly
