= Bohal, Bhiwani =

Coordinates: 28.961°N 75.936°E

Bohal is a village in the Bhiwani district of the Indian state of Haryana. It lies approximately 27 kilometres (17 mi) north west of the district headquarters town of Bhiwani. As of the 2011 Census of India, the village had 349 households with a population of 1,919 of whom 991 were male and 928 female. It has one temple.For political representational purposes the village is part of Bawani Khera Assembly constituency and the Hisar Lok Sabha constituency.
