= Nimari =

Nimari or Nimadi may refer to:

- something from the Nimar region in Madhya Pradesh, India
  - Nimadi language
  - Nimari cattle, a breed of cattle
- Nimari, Bhiwani, a village in Haryana, India
