= Baliali =

Coordinates: 28.896°N 76.014°E

Baliali is a village in Bawani khera tehsil of Bhiwani district of Indian state of Haryana. It lies approximately 15 kilometres (9.3 mi) north west of the district headquarters town of Bhiwani. As of the 2011 Census of India, the village had 2405 households with a population of 12,440 of which 6,562 were male and 5,878 female.For political representational purposes the village is part of Bawani Khera Assembly constituency and the Hisar Lok Sabha constituency.
