= Manheru =

Coordinates: 28.708°N 76.219°E

Manheru is one of the largest village in Bhiwani district, Haryana state, India. Manheru shares its boundaries with the Madhumadhvi, Nangal, Dhareru Gauripur, Kasni and Hindol villages. The village has railway stations on the Hissar-Jaipur track broad-gauge line of the North Western Railway.

== Geography ==
Manheru is situated about 12 kilometres (7.5 mi) southwest of the district capital Bhiwani and has an average elevation of about 220 metres (720 ft). Much like the rest of India, the people of Manheru rely on ground water for their basic needs, which falls during the monsoon season. However, the majority of the groundwater is potable. The climate can be classified as tropical steppe, hot semi-arid which is mainly characterized by the extreme dryness of the air except during monsoon months. During the three months of the south west monsoon from last week of June to September, moist oceanic air penetrates the village and causes high humidity, cloudiness and monsoon rainfall.

The period from October to December constitutes post monsoon season. The cold weather season prevails from January to the beginning of March and is followed by the hot weather or summer season which prevails up to the last week of June.

Geologically, the area is almost plain and is on the tail of the Aravalli Range, the oldest fold mountains in India. The plain area is largely covered with alluvial sand with good fertility for crops. Seismically the area falls in zone-3 creating low damage risk from earthquakes.

The village is primarily residential and has 10000-12000 residents.

== History ==
The village has played an active role in politics and in the army, navy and air force of India as well as carved a niche in political history as the birthplace of Banarsi Das Gupta (Ex-Chief Minister of Haryana). He was a renowned freedom Fighter and went to jail many times during the British Raj.

== Government ==
The Village has many government edifices for the facilities of peoples, like hospital for mankind and for cattle too, banks and water works for smooth water supply. The village has consecrated temples like Devi Mandir, Dudha Dhari Mandir, Shyam Baba Mandir, Baba Baniwala Mandir and The Bala Ji Mandir, this too is popular nearby areas.For political representational purposes the village is part of Bhiwani Assembly constituency and the Bhiwani-Mahendragarh Lok Sabha constituency.
