= Talu, Bhiwani =

Talu
- Village
- Location in Haryana, India Talu (India)
- Coordinates: 28.9776°N 76.1429°E
- Country: India
- State: Haryana
- District: Bhiwani
- Tehsil: Bhiwani

Government
  - Body: Village panchayat

Population (2011)
  - Total: 8,243

Languages
  - Official: Hindi
- Time zone: UTC+5:30 (IST)
- PIN: 127041

Talu is a village in the Bhiwani district of the Indian state of Haryana. It is located approximately 19 kilometres (12 mi) north of the district headquarters town of Bhiwani. According to the As of the 2011 Census of India, the village had 1,526 households and a population of 8,243, consisting of 4,469 males and 3,774 females.For political representational purposes the village is part of Bawani Khera Assembly constituency and the Bhiwani-Mahendragarh Lok Sabha constituency.
