= Sanga, Bhiwani =

Sanga is a village in the Bhiwani district of the Indian state of Haryana. It lies 12 kilometres (7.5 mi) east of the district headquarters at Bhiwani and 261 kilometres (162 mi) from the state capital Chandigarh.For political representational purposes the village is part of Bhiwani Assembly constituency and the Bhiwani-Mahendragarh Lok Sabha constituency.

== Population ==
There is a total of 4,539 people in the village, sharing 857 houses, 2,449 male residents and 2,090 female residents. 555 of the population are children, with 303 male and 254 female. The literacy rate is 75.35%, with more in men than in women. A total of 2,057 people work, with 1,272 of them being male and 785 of them being females.

== Education ==
A college is present, the H.N College of Education, a college to create teachers.
