= Ghuskani, Bhiwani =

Ghuskani
- Village
- Location in Haryana, India Ghuskani (India)
- Coordinates: 28.8745°N 76.1589°E
- Country: India
- State: Haryana
- District: Bhiwani
- Tehsil: Bhiwani

Government
  - Body: Village panchayat

Population (2011)
  - Total: 3,070

Languages
  - Official: Hindi
- Time zone: UTC+5:30 (IST)

Ghuskani is a village in the Bhiwani district of the Indian state of Haryana. It lies approximately 9 kilometres (5.6 mi) north of the district headquarters town of Bhiwani. As of the 2011 Census of India, the village had 562 households with a population of 3,070 of which 1,653 were male and 1,417 female.For political representational purposes the village is part of Bawani Khera Assembly constituency and the Bhiwani-Mahendragarh Lok Sabha constituency.
