= Mansarbass =

- Location within Haryana Location within India
- Coordinates: 28.7306355°N 75.8915484°E
- Country: India

Government
  - Body: Village panchayat
- Time zone: UTC+5:30 (IST)
- PIN: 127029
- Sex ratio: 920 ♂/♀
- Website: bhiwani.nic.in

Mansarbass is a village in Bhiwani district, Haryana, India. According to local tradition, Mansarbass was founded by Chaudhary Dhannaram Dattusalia, a Jat landowner. The village is predominantly inhabited by people of the Dattusalia gotra.

== Geography ==
Mansarbass is located at 28.17°N 76.15°E. It has an average elevation of 237 metres (830 feet).For political representational purposes the village is part of Tosham Assembly constituency and the Bhiwani-Mahendragarh Lok Sabha constituency.

Agriculture is the primary occupation for the residents of the village. Because of this, they are one of the major producers of grain and milk in the state.
