= Tigri, Bhiwani =

Tigri
- Village
- Location in Haryana, India Tigri (India)
- Coordinates: 28.872°N 76.137°E
- Country: India
- State: Haryana
- District: Bhiwani
- Tehsil: Bhiwani

Government
  - Body: Village panchayat

Population (2011)
  - Total: 653

Languages
  - Official: Hindi
- Time zone: UTC+5:30 (IST)

Tigri is a village in the Bhiwani district of the Indian state of Haryana. It lies approximately 7.5 kilometres (4.7 mi) north of the district headquarters town of Bhiwani. As of the 2011 Census of India, the village had 118 households with a total population of 653 of which 353 were male and 300 female.
