= Mandhana, Bhiwani =

Mandhana
- Village
- Location in Haryana, India Mandhana (India)
- Coordinates: 28.9128°N 76.1147°E
- Country: India
- State: Haryana
- District: Bhiwani
- Tehsil: Bhiwani

Government
  - Body: Village Pandit Majority

Population (2011)
  - Total: 6,164

Languages
  - Official: Hindi
- Time zone: UTC+5:30 (IST)
- PIN: 127032

Mandhana is a village in the Bhiwani district of the Indian state of Haryana. It was settled by Mandu Rishi of Kaushik Gautra in 1316. It lies approximately 17 kilometres (11 mi) north of the district main town Bhiwani. As of the 2011 Census of India, the village had 1,107 households with a population of 6,164 of which 3,305 were male and 2,859 female. Sh. Mangat Ram Sharma (I.A.S.), First Commissioned Officer in Indian Air Force Wing Commander Ramesh Kumar, Major Himanshu Kaushik, Flying Officer Anil Kaushik (Fighter pilot MiG-21), Captain Dharambir Singh M.TECH (EME), Captain Ishwar Singh (SM), S.A.O. Sh. Shubhash Kaushik, AGM Sanjeev Kumar Kaushik (IIT Delhi) are few personalities whose contribution is admirable in developing the nation.For political representational purposes the village is part of Bhiwani Assembly constituency and the Bhiwani-Mahendragarh Lok Sabha constituency.
