= Chaudhary Bansi Lal University =

State university in Haryana, India

- Motto: विद्या गुरूणां गुरूः (Sanskrit)
- Type: State university, Postgraduate
- Established: 2014
- Chancellor: Governor of Haryana
- Vice-Chancellor: Deepti Dharmani
- Location: Bhiwani, Haryana, 127021, India; 28.799045°N 76.133511°E
- Language: English & Hindi
- Website: https://cblu.ac.in/

Chaudhary Bansi Lal University (CBLU) is a state university in the city of Bhiwani, Haryana. Established in 2014 the university offers postgraduate courses in various disciplines. CBLU is to the west of Delhi at a distance of 125 km and south of Chandigarh at a distance of 285 km. MDU Rohtak is at a distance of 52 km from CBLU. The nick name of the university is Sea-Blue.

== History ==
Chaudhary Bansi Lal University was established by Government of Haryana in 2014 under Act 25 of 2014. The University is a State University and is recognized by the University Grants Commission (India). The University is named after Bansi Lal who was the former Chief Minister of Haryana.

== Faculties ==
- Faculty of Commerce & Management
- Faculty of Education
- Faculty of Humanities
- Faculty of Life Science
- Faculty of Physical Science
- Faculty of Social science
- Faculty of Pharmaceutical Sciences
- Faculty of Behavioural and Cognitive Sciences
- Faculty of Earth, Environment and Space Sciences
- Faculty of Engineering & Technology
- Faculty of Law
- Faculty of Health System

== Affiliated colleges ==
Its jurisdiction extends over 2 districts - Bhiwani and Charkhi Dadri.
