= Love City =

Love City may refer to:

- "Love City (Postcards from Duluth)", a song by Noel Paul Stookey from Peter, Paul and Mary's album: Late Again
- "Ai City", a Japanese science fiction manga created by Shuuhou Itahashi
  - Love city, a 1986 animated film based on the manga
- Love City, a pervasive game
- Love City, an EP from pop duo D,Kr

== See also ==
- The City of Love, a 2007 novel by Rimi B. Chatterjee
- City of Love (album), a 2020 album by Deacon Blue
- The City of Brotherly Love, a nickname for Philadelphia
- Prem Nagar (disambiguation)
