= Pradeep Narwal =

Indian politician

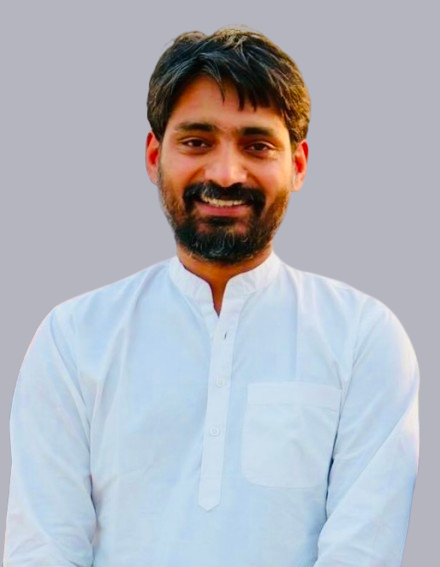
- Pradeep Narwal in 2024

AICC Secretary

Personal details
- Born: June 1991 (33) Sonipat, Haryana
- Party: Indian National Congress
- Education: Jawaharlal Nehru University (MA)
- Profession: Politician

Pradeep Narwal (born June 1991) is an Indian politician from the Indian National Congress (INC). He serves as the national secretary of the All India Congress Committee (AICC) and Co-Incharge for Uttar Pradesh. A prominent Dalit leader and Ambedkarite activist, Narwal is known for his close association with the top leadership of the Indian National Congress, and he worked as the AICC secretary working closely with Priyanka Gandhi.

== Early life and education ==
Pradeep Narwal was born and raised in Kathura village, Sonipat, Haryana. Growing up in a rural setting, he experienced firsthand the challenges faced by Dalit communities, which shaped his understanding of social issues. Narwal pursued higher education at Jawaharlal Nehru University (JNU) in Delhi, where he became actively involved in student politics, particularly advocating for the rights of Dalit students and marginalized communities. His involvement in social justice movements at JNU strengthened his political career and solidified his commitment to the upliftment of the oppressed.

== Political career ==
Narwal began his political journey at Jawaharlal Nehru University (JNU) by joining the Akhil Bharatiya Vidyarthi Parishad (ABVP), a student organisation affiliated with the Rashtriya Swayamsevak Sangh (RSS). He served as the Joint Secretary of the ABVP's JNU unit. In February 2016, following the controversial events at JNU and the handling of the Rohith Vemula case, Narwal resigned from the ABVP, expressing concerns over the organization's approach and the portrayal of JNU as 'anti-national.'

After leaving ABVP, Narwal joined the Indian National Congress (INC), where he continued his political activism. His transition from ABVP to Congress marked a shift in his political views and his commitment to addressing issues he felt were not adequately addressed by his previous affiliation.

A firm Ambedkarite, Narwal has been an outspoken advocate for the upliftment of Dalits and marginalized communities, aligning himself with the ideals of Dr. B.R. Ambedkar. His advocacy for Dalit rights has earned him a reputation as a leader committed to social equality.

Narwal is considered a trusted ally of the Gandhi family, particularly after becoming an active member of the Congress party, where he has continued to champion Dalit rights and social justice—key areas of focus for the party. His strong alignment with the Congress leadership, particularly with Rahul Gandhi and Priyanka Gandhi, has positioned him as a significant voice within the party, advocating for Dalit empowerment and other social causes.

Narwal is considered a trusted ally of the Gandhi family, particularly after becoming an active member of the Congress party. He worked as the national secretary of the All India Congress Committee (AICC) for Uttar Pradesh, where he closely collaborated with Priyanka Gandhi and the party's high command in the state. Narwal has continued to champion Dalit rights and social justice—key areas of focus for the party. His strong alignment with the Congress leadership, especially with Rahul Gandhi and Priyanka Gandhi Vadra, has positioned him as a significant voice within the party, advocating for Dalit empowerment and other social causes.

Congress has appointed Pradeep Narwal as a member of the party's three-member screening committee for the upcoming 2025 Delhi Legislative Assembly election.

== 2024 Haryana Legislative Assembly Elections ==
In the 2024 Haryana Legislative Assembly elections, Pradeep Narwal was fielded by the Indian National Congress (INC) High Command as the party's candidate for the Bawani Khera Assembly constituency. His candidature marked a significant step in the party's efforts to strengthen its Dalit leadership and expand its appeal in Haryana. Narwal's campaign gained considerable attention when Priyanka Gandhi, a prominent Congress leader, held a rally in his support, emphasising his commitment to social justice and his efforts to uplift marginalized communities.

Despite a fierce contest, Narwal performed admirably in the election, securing a strong share of the vote. Despite securing a significantly higher vote share compared to the previous election, he narrowly lost the seat. His performance was seen as a victory for the Dalit cause, reflecting the growing support for a new generation of Dalit leaders in mainstream politics. His campaign, which focused on local issues such as economic development, infrastructure, and the rights of marginalized communities, was widely recognised. Narwal's resilience and strong performance in the face of tough competition have positioned him as a prominent political figure, with his efforts to represent the Dalit community continuing to resonate in the region.

== Ambedkarism ==
Pradeep Narwal is a strong advocate for Dalit rights and is committed to Ambedkarism, following the principles of Dr. B.R. Ambedkar, which emphasise social justice, equality, and the upliftment of marginalized communities. Narwal actively fights for the rights of Dalits, ensuring their voices are heard and represented in political spaces.
