= Hawa Singh =

Indian boxer

Honorary Captain Hawa Singh Sheoran
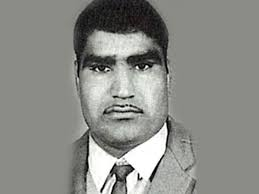
- Born: 16 December 1937; Umarwas, Haryana, India
- Died: 14 August 2000 (aged 62); Bhiwani, Haryana, India
- Citizenship: Indian
- Occupations: Boxer Heavyweight; Army Officer
- Military career
- Allegiance: India
- Branch: Indian Army
- Rank: Honorary Captain
Hawa Singh
Medal record
Representing India
Asian Games
Gold medal – first place	1966 Bangkok	Heavyweight
Gold medal – first place	1970 Bangkok	Heavyweight

Honorary Captain Hawa Singh Sheoran (16 December 1937 - 14 August 2000) was an Indian Heavyweight boxer, who dominated Indian and Asian amateur boxing for a decade in his weight class. He won the Asian Games gold medal in the Heavyweight category in consecutive editions of the games, in the 1966 Asiad and the 1970 Asiad both held in Bangkok, Thailand - a feat unmatched by any Indian boxer to date (August 2008). He won the National Championships in the Heavyweight category a record 11 consecutive times — from 1961 to 1972.

== Biography ==
Hawa Singh Sheoran was born in a Jat Family now Haryana in 1937. He enrolled in the Indian Army in 1956, and became the champion of the Western Command in 1960 by defeating the defending champion, Mohabbat Singh. He won the National Championships for 11 straight years from 1961 to 1972, winning gold medals at the 1966 Asian Games and the 1970 Asian Games in Bangkok. He was awarded the Arjuna Award, India's highest sporting award, in 1966..

After retiring, he took up coaching and was the co-founder of the Bhiwani Boxing Club which produced a slew of Indian boxers in the 1990s and 2000s (decade), including Olympic medallist Vijender Singh. He was awarded the Dronacharya Award in 1999.

He died suddenly in Bhiwani on 14 August 2000 – 15 days before he was to have received the Dronacharya Award.

Jaismine Lamboria, gold medal winner at the 2025 World Boxing Championships, the 2025 World Boxing Cup and the 2026 Commonwealth Games in the 57 Kg category is his great-grand daughter.
