= Bishamber Singh =

Indian politician

Bishamber Singh (born 8 November 1969) is a former member of the Haryana Legislative Assembly from the BJP representing the Bawani Khera Vidhan sabha Constituency in Haryana. He was a cabinet minister in the Nayab Singh Saini led government.
