= Vaman =

Vaman is a given name. Notable people with the name include:

- Vaman Shivram Apte (1858–1892), Indian lexicographer and a professor of Sanskrit at Pune's Fergusson College
- Vishnu Vaman Bapat (born 1871), Indian philosopher, famous for his commentary in Marathi on ancient Sanskrit texts
- Keshav Vaman Bhole (1896–1967), also known as Keshavrao Bhole, well-known music composer and critic in Indian cinema
- Vaman Krushna Chorghade (1914–1995), Marathi writer from Maharashtra, India
- Shankar Vaman Dandekar (1896–1969), philosopher and educationist from Maharashtra, India
- Harihar Vaman Deshpande (1905–1965), born at Chendkapur (Amravati) Maharashtra, India
- Raghunath Vaman Dighe (1896–1980), Marathi writer from Maharashtra, India
- Vaman Gopal Joshi (1881–1956), Marathi journalist, playwright, and freedom fighter, from Maharashtra, India
- Vaman Malhar Joshi (1882–1943), Marathi writer from Maharashtra, India
- Kundapur Vaman Kamath, chief of the New Development Bank of BRICS countries
- Pandurang Vaman Kane (1880–1972), notable Indologist and Sanskrit scholar
- Vaman Tabaji Kardak (1927–2003), Marathi Ambedkarist poet, reformer
- Bhalchandra Vaman Kelkar (1920–1987), Marathi writer and actor, from Maharashtra, India
- Vaman Srinivas Kudva, founder director of Syndicate Bank
- Vaman Kumar (born 1935), former Indian cricketer
- Vaman Pandit (1608–1695), Marathi scholar and poet of India
- Laxman Vaman Paranjpe, co-founder of the Hindu nationalist organisation Rashtriya Swayamsevak Sangh (RSS)
- Datto Vaman Potdar (1890–1979), Indian historian, writer, and orator
- Basti Vaman Shenoy (born 1934), Konkani activist, founder of World Konkani Centre in Shakthinagar, Mangalore
- Vishnu Vaman Shirvadakar (1912–1999), (Kusumāgraj), Marathi poet, playwright, novelist, short story writer

== See also ==
- Vaman River, tributary of the Bistricioara River in Romania
- VMAN
- Vaamanan
- Vahman
- Vamana
- Vamban
