= Barsi (surname) =

Barsi is a surname. Notable people with the surname include:

- Etelka Barsi-Pataky (1941–2018), Hungarian politician
- Judith Barsi (1978–1988), American actress
- Kinga Barsi (born 1976), Hungarian alpine skier
- László Barsi (1904–1975), Hungarian sprinter
