= Amalka =

Amalka may refer to:

- Amalka is a Slavic diminutive of Amalia
- Amalka, Poland, village in Poland
- Amalka Supercomputing facility, supercomputer in the Czech Republic
- Víla Amálka - Fairy Amalka, Czech animated fairy tale
