= Richhpal Ram =

Indian recipient of the Victoria Cross (1899–1941)

- Born: 20 August 1899; Barda, British Punjab, British India
- Died: 12 February 1941 (aged 41); Keren, Italian Eritrea
- Burial place: Keren Cremation Memorial, Senafe Debub, Eritrea
- Military career
- Allegiance: British India
- Branch: British Indian Army
- Service years: 1920–1941 †
- Rank: Subedar (Captain)
- Units: 4th Battalion, 6th Rajputana Rifles
- Conflicts: World War II; East African Campaign; Battle of Keren (DOW)
- Awards: Victoria Cross

Richhpal Ram VC (20 August 1899 – 12 February 1941) was an Indian recipient of the Victoria Cross, the highest and most prestigious award for gallantry in the face of the enemy that can be awarded to British and Commonwealth forces.

== His family ==
Richhpal Ram came from Barda village, tehsil Satnali district Mahendargarh in Haryana.

== Career ==
Ram enlisted on 20 August 1920 in the 4/6th Rajputana Rifles.

He was 41 years old, and a Subedar in the 6th Rajputana Rifles, in the Indian Army during World War II when the following deed took place for which he was awarded the VC during the Battle of Keren.

On 7 February 1941 at Keren, Eritrea, Subadar Richhpal Ram led a successful attack on the enemy and subsequently repelled six counter-attacks and then, without a shot left, brought the few survivors of his company back. Five days later, when leading another attack, his right foot was blown off, but he continued to encourage his men until he died.

The official citation for the award, published in The London Gazette on 4 July 1941 reads:

The KING has been graciously pleased to approve of the posthumous award of the Victoria Cross to the undermentioned: —
Subadar Richpal Ram, 6th Rajputana Rifles, Indian Army.
During the assault on enemy positions in front of Keren, Eritrea, on the night of 7-8th February, 1941, Subadar Richpal Ram, who was second-in-command of a leading company, insisted on accompanying the forward platoon and led its attack on the first objective with great dash and gallantry. His company commander being then wounded, he assumed command of the company, and led the attack of the remaining two platoons to the final objective. In face of heavy fire, some thirty men with this officer at their head rushed the objective with the bayonet and captured it. The party was completely isolated, but under the inspiring leadership of Subadar Richpal Ram, it beat back six enemy counter-attacks between midnight and 0430 hours. By now, ammunition had run out, and this officer extricated his command and fought his way back to his battalion with a handful of survivors through the surrounding enemy.
Again, in the attack on the same position on 12th February, this officer led the attack of his company. He pressed on fearlessly and determinedly in the face of heavy and accurate fire, and by his personal example inspired his company with his resolute spirit until his right foot was blown off. He then suffered further wounds from which he died. While lying wounded he continued to wave his men on, and his final words were " We'll capture the objective ".
The heroism, determination and devotion to duty shown by this officer were beyond praise, and provided an inspiration to all who saw him.

== Medal ==
The Victoria Cross Medal is displayed in Delhi Cantonment Raj Rifles Officer Mess (Museum).

== See also ==
- East African Campaign (World War II)
