= Bawani Khera =

Bawani khera
- town
- Nickname: Bhawanigarh
- Location in Haryana, India Bawani khera (India)
- Coordinates: 28.9500°N 76.0167°E
- Country: India
- State: Haryana
- District: Bhiwani

Population (2001)
  - Total: 17,438

Languages
  - Official: Hindi
- Time zone: UTC+5:30 (IST)
- ISO 3166 code: IN-HR
- Vehicle registration: HR
- Website: haryana.gov.in

Bawani Khera is a town and municipal committee in the Bhiwani district of the Indian state of Haryana.

== History ==
=== Early medieval period ===
History of town dates back to at least the 1st century, as evidenced by the discovery of 31 x 22 x 5 cm bricks, found during excavation of a mound at Bawani Khera that belong to the Kushan-Gupta Empires era (1st - 6th centuries).

=== Late medieval era ===
According to the oral tradition of the present inhabitants, the town has been continuously inhabited by their ancestors for the last 700 years. Among the ancient sites are the deras of Naths and Dadupanthis. The Dera of Naths founded by Mahant Bali Nath is older and even predates the village. The Dera of Naths also has a 3 centuries old Shivalaya called Shri Gauri Shankar mandir.

== Demographics ==
As of the 2001 India census, Bawani Khera had a population of 17,438. Males constitute 53% of the population and females 47%. The average literacy in Bawani Khera is 56%, lower than the national average of 59.5%; with 63% of the males and 37% of females literate. 17% of the population is under six years of age.

== See also ==
- Bawani Khera (Vidhan Sabha constituency)
- Tosham rock inscription
