= Tosham =

Tosham Tusham
- Town
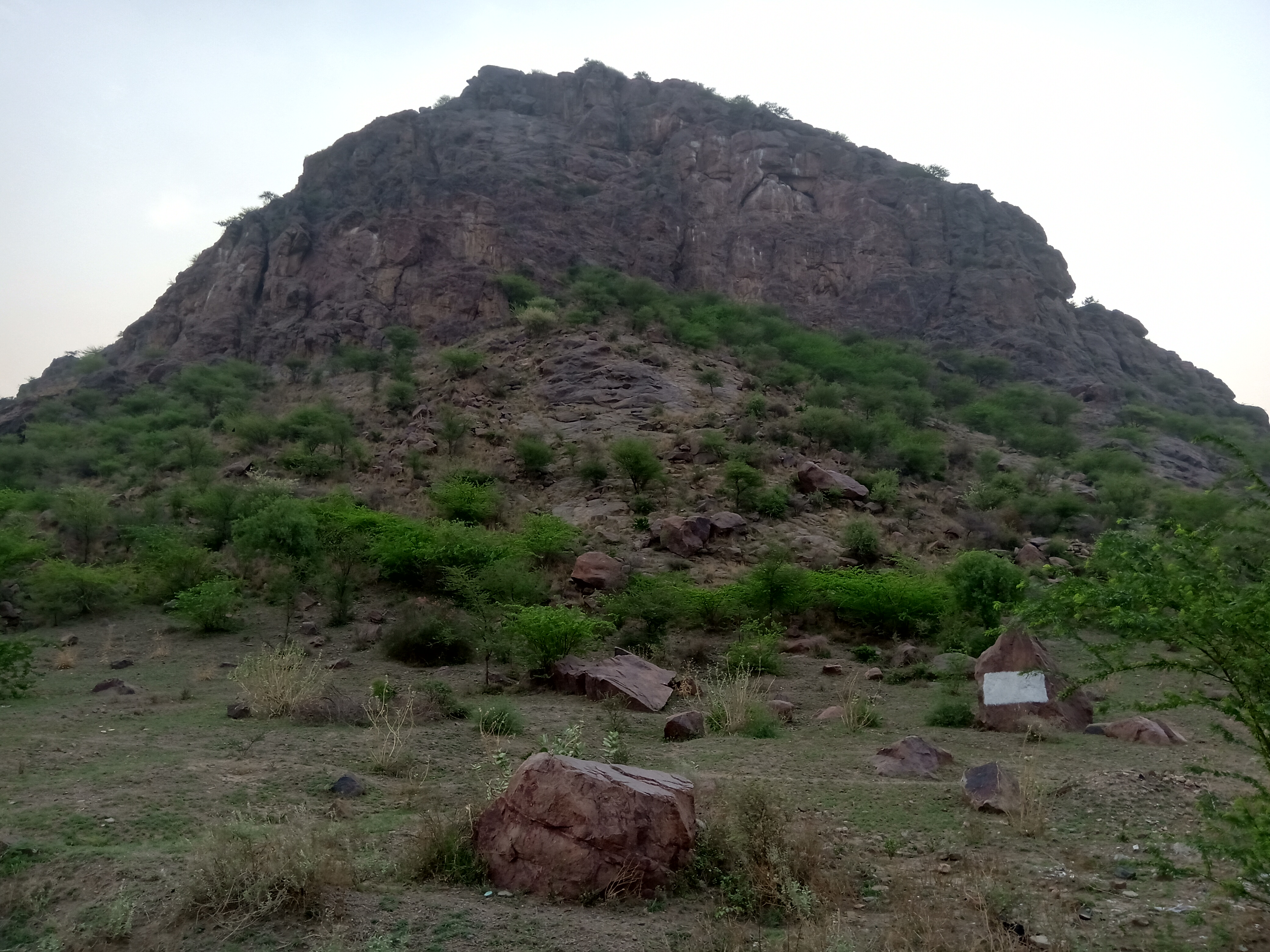
- Tosham Hill

- Location in Haryana, India Tosham (India)
- Coordinates: 28.88°N 75.92°E
- Country: India
- State: Haryana
- District: Bhiwani
- Elevation: 207 m (679 ft)

Population (2011)
  - Total: 15,559

Languages
  - Official: Hindi, English
  - Regional: Bagri
- Time zone: UTC+5:30 (IST)
- PIN: 127040
- Telephone code: +91-1253-XXXXXX
- ISO 3166 code: IN-HR
- Vehicle registration: HR-46 to HR-48
- Website: haryana.gov.in

Tosham is a town and a Gram Panchayat on the foot of Tosham Hill range in Bhiwani district in the Indian state of Haryana. It is in the foothills of Tosham hill range of Aravali Mountain Range.

== History ==
=== Early and medieval history ===
Tosham was under Gupta rule in the 5th Century as per the inscription. The history of Tosham dates back to at least the 4th century, as evident by the Sanskrit language Tosham rock inscription at Tosham hill. Later it came under Tomar during the rule of Anangpal Tomar and then Chauhan Rajput rulers during the rule of Prithviraj Chauhan who built the Baradari, before falling into the hands of Delhi Sultanates, Mughal Empire, Shekhawati and British Raj. Pre-Indus Valley Civilization mine, smelt and houses have been found at Khanak hills of Tosham Hill range

== Demographics ==
As of 2001 India census, Tosham had a population of 11,271. Males constitute 53% of the population and females 47%. Tosham has an average literacy rate of 64%, higher than the national average of 59.5%: male literacy is 72%, and female literacy is 54%. In Tosham, 14% of the population is under 6 years of age.

== Geography ==
Tosham is located at 28.88°N 75.92°E. It has an average elevation of 207 metres (679 feet).

There are ruins of a medieval fort wall on top of Tosham hill, said to be from the times of Prithviraj Chauhan major part of which was destroyed in 1982 when an aircraft crashed on the fort.

=== Tosham rock inscription ===
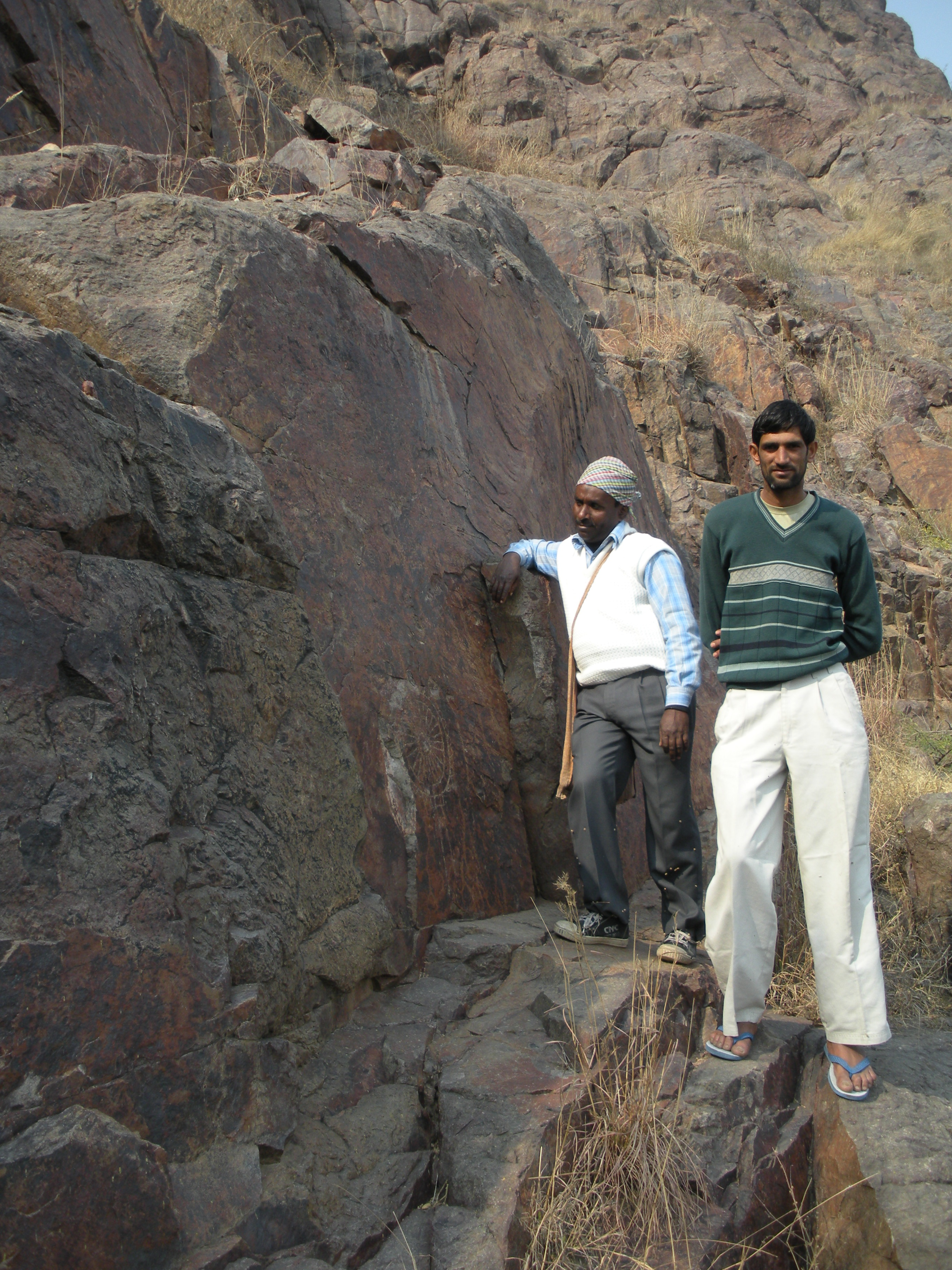
Tosham rock

Tosham rock inscription, dating from 4th to 5th century, is an epigraph documenting the establishment of a monastery. The Toshām rock inscription is an epigraphic record documenting the establishment of a monastery and the building of water tanks for followers of the Sātvata religion. Found in Tosham, Haryana (India), It is not dated but can be assigned to the early fifth century CE. The inscription records the lineage and building activities of a line of Sātvata religious preceptors (ācārya) dating to the 4th and 5th centuries CE. This is an important record for the history of the Vaiṣṇava faith. The kinship and clan position of the Sātvatas is described in the article on the Yadavas. It does not appear to have been as yet satisfactorily translated. It seems to refer to a Scythian king Tushara who appears to have conquered the Gupta Galotkacha who reigned from about A. D. 50 to A. D. 79 and is referred to in the inscription. There appears to be evidence to show that the Tosham hill was a monastery of Buddhist monks or Bhikshus. The date of the inscription is said to be A. D. 162–224.

=== Tosham rock paintings ===
In 2013, rudimentary rock paintings (supposedly circa 5th century CE) at the site of Tosham rock inscription were discovered. These rock painting included several figures, such as a royal family, a saint, and dinosaur-like creature.

=== Vaman statue ===
Tosham Vaman statue, a 1,000 years old 60 kg carved red stone statue dating back to 8th to 10 century, of Vaman incarnation of Hindu deity Vishnu was found atop Tosham hill in January 2018 while policemen protecting the Haryana Police wireless repeater antennae system were clearing the rubble to clean the water tank there. In March 2018, this statue was relocated to the Jahaj Kothi Zonal Museum at Hisar.

=== Male statue ===
In October 2021, another late-Medieval era male stone statue was also found, suggesting continuous cultural layering and usage of the hill for centuries.

=== Scepture statue ===
A fragment of intriguing carved stone with amalka/kalash motifs was found, which could either be temple pinnacle, or possibly the top of a deity’s sceptre—maybe of Vishnu—given its structural form.

=== Sacred Sulphur Ponds of Tosham Hill ===
There are several ponds on Tosham Hill inside the caves, namely Pandu Teerth Kund, Surya Kund, Kukkar Kund, Gyarasia/Vyas Kund, and a reservoir or a small tank on the summit of the hill to store rainwater. Water in these kunds (ponds) in various caverns contain sulfur which is considered sacred by the devotees and pilgrimages as it heals skin diseases.

=== Interesting infrastructure ===
==== Police Telecomm Tower ====
Haryana Police has wireless repeater antennae in three locations, at Tosham Hill range in Bhiwani district, Takdi hill in Rewari district, and at Sarahan hill in Himachal Pradesh. Police HQ uses Sarahan tower to transmit signals to Tosham Hill. Tosham Hill tower boosts and sends the signal to Takdi Hill. Tosham Hill tower covers the area of the signal of Bhiwani, Hisar, Fatehabad, Sirsa, Rohtak, and Jhajjhar District Police Headquarters. Take Hill tower covers the Gurugram, Faridabad, Palwal, Nuh, Rewari, Narnaul and Haryana Bhawan Delhi.

== See also ==
- Tosham Assembly constituency
- Administrative divisions of Haryana
- History of Haryana
