= Bawani Khera Assembly constituency =

Coordinates: 28.9500°N 76.0167°E

Bawani Khera
- Constituency No. 59 for the Haryana Legislative Assembly

Constituency details
- Country: India
- Region: North India
- State: Haryana
- Established: 1967
- Total electors: 2,17,262
- Reservation: SC

Member of Legislative Assembly
- 15th Haryana Legislative Assembly
- Incumbent Kapoor Singh
- Party: BJP
- Elected year: 2024

Bawani Khera Assembly constituency is one of the 90 constituencies of the Legislative Assembly in Haryana state in northern India. This constituency is reserved for the candidates belonging to the Scheduled castes.

== Overview ==
Bawani Khera (constituency number 59) is one of the 6 Assembly constituencies located in Bhiwani district. This constituency covers the entire Bawani Khera tehsil and part of Bhiwani tehsil.

It is part of Hisar Lok Sabha constituency.

== Members of Legislative Assembly ==
Year	Member	Party
1967	Jagan Nath	Indian National Congress
1968	Subedar Prabhu Singh	Indian National Congress
1972	Amar Singh	Vishal Haryana Party
1977	Jagan Nath	Janata Party
1982	Amar Singh	Lokdal
1987	Jagan Nath	Lokdal
1991	Amar Singh	Haryana Vikas Party
1996	Jagan Nath	Haryana Vikas Party
2000	Ramkishan Fauji	Haryana Vikas Party
2005	Ramkishan Fauji	Indian National Congress
2009	Ramkishan Fauji	Indian National Congress
2014	Bishamber Singh	Bharatiya Janata Party
2019	Bishamber Singh	Bharatiya Janata Party
2024	Kapoor Singh	Bharatiya Janata Party

== Election results ==
=== Assembly Election 2024 ===
2024 Haryana Legislative Assembly election: Bawani Khera
Party	Candidate	Votes	%	±%
BJP	Kapoor Singh	80,077	52.21%	▲13.71
INC	Pradeep Narwal (politician)	58,298	38.01%	▲7.51
Independent	Master Satbir Ratera	11,287	7.36%	New
BSP	Sandeep Singh Janagal	1,128	0.74%	▼1.84
JJP	Guddi Langyan	997	0.65%	▼16.21
NOTA	None of the Above	524	0.34%	New
Margin of victory		21,779	14.20%	▲6.19
Turnout		1,53,369	71.15%	▲3.47
Registered electors		2,17,262		▲7.22
BJP hold		Swing	▲13.71	

=== Assembly Election 2019 ===
2019 Haryana Legislative Assembly election: Bawani Khera
Party	Candidate	Votes	%	±%
BJP	Bishamber Singh	52,387	38.51%	▲5.01
INC	Ramkishan Fauji	41,492	30.50%	▲6.47
JJP	Ram Singh Vaid	22,934	16.86%	New
Rashtriya Janta Party	Vikas	9,380	6.89%	New
BSP	Banarsi Dass	3,499	2.57%	New
INLD	Dharam Devi	997	0.73%	▼30.95
CPI(M)	Ram Mehar Singh	923	0.68%	New
Bhartiya Sarvodaya Party	Ramtilak	837	0.62%	New
AAP	Savita Nanda	700	0.51%	New
Independent	Suresh Kumar Divyang	686	0.50%	New
Margin of victory		10,895	8.01%	▲6.20
Turnout		1,36,052	67.67%	▼10.63
Registered electors		2,01,042		▲11.42
BJP hold		Swing	▲5.01	

=== Assembly Election 2014 ===
2014 Haryana Legislative Assembly election: Bawani Khera
Party	Candidate	Votes	%	±%
BJP	Bishamber Singh	47,323	33.49%	▲32.06
INLD	Daya Bhurtana	44,764	31.68%	▲4.14
INC	Ramkishan Fauji	33,942	24.02%	▼9.53
HJC(BL)	Raghbir Singh Ranga	11,356	8.04%	▼16.26
Margin of victory		2,559	1.81%	▼4.20
Turnout		1,41,294	78.30%	▲9.79
Registered electors		1,80,443		▲18.37
BJP gain from INC		Swing	▼0.06	

=== Assembly Election 2009 ===
2009 Haryana Legislative Assembly election: Bawani Khera
Party	Candidate	Votes	%	±%
INC	Ramkishan Fauji	35,039	33.55%	▼22.99
INLD	Azad Singh	28,766	27.54%	▼6.47
HJC(BL)	Mahender Singh	25,376	24.30%	New
BSP	Krishan Kumar S/O Dharampal	5,008	4.80%	▲1.92
Independent	Jitender Nath	3,152	3.02%	New
BJP	Jai Narain	1,500	1.44%	▼0.47
Independent	Ajit	1,107	1.06%	New
Independent	Narender Kumar	815	0.78%	New
Smast Bhartiya Party	Tejpal	567	0.54%	New
Margin of victory		6,273	6.01%	▼16.52
Turnout		1,04,433	68.51%	▼7.29
Registered electors		1,52,436		▲14.53
INC hold		Swing	▼22.99	

=== Assembly Election 2005 ===
2005 Haryana Legislative Assembly election: Bawani Khera
Party	Candidate	Votes	%	±%
INC	Ramkishan Fauji	57,050	56.54%	▲29.25
INLD	Raghbir Singh Ranga	34,323	34.02%	New
BSP	Krishan Jamalpur	2,902	2.88%	▲1.89
BJP	Nand Ram	1,919	1.90%	▼18.22
Independent	Ram Chander Chauhan	1,572	1.56%	New
LJP	Ashok Khundia	1,025	1.02%	New
Independent	Rajbala	589	0.58%	New
Independent	Surender	519	0.51%	New
Margin of victory		22,727	22.53%	▲6.16
Turnout		1,00,896	75.80%	▲5.90
Registered electors		1,33,102		▲14.72
INC gain from HVP		Swing	▲12.88	

=== Assembly Election 2000 ===
2000 Haryana Legislative Assembly election: Bawani Khera
Party	Candidate	Votes	%	±%
HVP	Ramkishan Fauji	35,410	43.66%	▼13.56
INC	Jagan Nath	22,134	27.29%	▲13.78
BJP	Santosh Sarwan	16,316	20.12%	New
Independent	Amar Singh	5,582	6.88%	New
BSP	Amrit Dass	803	0.99%	▼4.18
Margin of victory		13,276	16.37%	▼23.00
Turnout		81,102	70.78%	▲2.08
Registered electors		1,16,024		▲1.47
HVP hold		Swing	▼13.56	

=== Assembly Election 1996 ===
1996 Haryana Legislative Assembly election: Bawani Khera
Party	Candidate	Votes	%	±%
HVP	Jagan Nath S/O Gur Dayal	44,372	57.22%	▲20.78
SAP	Raghvir Singh Ranga	13,838	17.84%	New
INC	Amar Singh	10,480	13.51%	▼6.03
BSP	Suresh	4,012	5.17%	New
Independent	Jagdish Mistri	1,367	1.76%	New
Independent	Rajpal	798	1.03%	New
Independent	Jagdish Mistri	478	0.62%	New
JP	Mewa Singh	447	0.58%	▼24.23
AIIC(T)	Harphool Singh	418	0.54%	New
Margin of victory		30,534	39.37%	▲27.75
Turnout		77,549	69.51%	▲10.63
Registered electors		1,14,339		▲8.95
HVP hold		Swing	▲20.78	

=== Assembly Election 1991 ===
1991 Haryana Legislative Assembly election: Bawani Khera
Party	Candidate	Votes	%	±%
HVP	Amar Singh	21,869	36.43%	New
JP	Jagan Nath	14,892	24.81%	New
INC	Raghbir Singh Ranga	11,730	19.54%	▼10.71
Independent	Harphul Singh	5,062	8.43%	New
BJP	Nand Ram	1,558	2.60%	New
Independent	Mewa Singh Bagri	1,179	1.96%	New
Independent	Ram Sarup	874	1.46%	New
Independent	Master Dewan Singh	816	1.36%	New
Independent	Kashmir Singh	548	0.91%	New
Independent	Om Parkash	363	0.60%	New
Margin of victory		6,977	11.62%	▼24.62
Turnout		60,023	59.68%	▼8.83
Registered electors		1,04,946		▲7.60
HVP gain from LKD		Swing	▼30.06	

=== Assembly Election 1987 ===
1987 Haryana Legislative Assembly election: Bawani Khera
Party	Candidate	Votes	%	±%
LKD	Jagan Nath	42,820	66.50%	▲21.82
INC	Amar Singh	19,481	30.25%	▼11.97
VHP	Ram Singh	711	1.10%	New
Independent	Bhalle Ram	344	0.53%	New
Margin of victory		23,339	36.24%	▲33.79
Turnout		64,394	67.47%	▼0.64
Registered electors		97,531		▲19.56
LKD hold		Swing	▲21.82	

=== Assembly Election 1982 ===
1982 Haryana Legislative Assembly election: Bawani Khera
Party	Candidate	Votes	%	±%
LKD	Amar Singh	24,298	44.68%	New
INC	Jagan Nath	22,963	42.22%	▲22.63
Independent	Ram Sawrup	3,343	6.15%	New
Independent	Ramdhari	1,642	3.02%	New
Independent	Ram Singh	392	0.72%	New
JP	Mange Ram	323	0.59%	▼75.65
Margin of victory		1,335	2.45%	▼54.20
Turnout		54,384	67.87%	▲14.49
Registered electors		81,578		▲20.54
LKD gain from JP		Swing	▼31.57	

=== Assembly Election 1977 ===
1977 Haryana Legislative Assembly election: Bawani Khera
Party	Candidate	Votes	%	±%
JP	Jagan Nath	26,925	76.25%	New
INC	Amar Singh	6,919	19.59%	▼20.19
Independent	Ram Singh	769	2.18%	New
Independent	Kartar	700	1.98%	New
Margin of victory		20,006	56.65%	▲36.22
Turnout		35,313	52.68%	▼16.75
Registered electors		67,679		▲21.18
JP gain from VHP		Swing	▲16.03	

=== Assembly Election 1972 ===
1972 Haryana Legislative Assembly election: Bawani Khera
Party	Candidate	Votes	%	±%
VHP	Amar Singh	23,180	60.22%	▲40.76
INC	Subedar Prabhu Singh	15,314	39.78%	▼4.38
Margin of victory		7,866	20.43%	▲10.26
Turnout		38,494	70.75%	▲27.95
Registered electors		55,850	▲5.14	
VHP gain from INC		Swing		

=== Assembly Election 1968 ===
1968 Haryana Legislative Assembly election: Bawani Khera
Party	Candidate	Votes	%	±%
INC	Subedar Prabhu Singh	9,611	44.16%	▼9.56
SWA	Amar Singh	7,397	33.99%	New
VHP	Fateh Singh	4,234	19.45%	New
Independent	Jawala Parshad	375	1.72%	New
RPI	Sispal Singh	148	0.68%	▼0.89
Margin of victory		2,214	10.17%	▼22.08
Turnout		21,765	41.98%	▼20.70
Registered electors		53,122		▲2.45
INC hold		Swing	▼9.56	

=== Assembly Election 1967 ===
1967 Haryana Legislative Assembly election: Bawani Khera
Party	Candidate	Votes	%	±%
INC	Jagan Nath	17,179	53.72%	New
Independent	F. Singh	6,866	21.47%	New
SSP	Charanji	3,495	10.93%	New
ABJS	A. Nand	2,851	8.92%	New
Independent	Chandgi	719	2.25%	New
RPI	K. Ram	503	1.57%	New
CPI(M)	M. Ram	230	0.72%	New
Margin of victory		10,313	32.25%	
Turnout		31,979	65.92%	
Registered electors		51,851		
INC win (new seat)				

== See also ==
- Bawani Khera
- Haryana Legislative Assembly
- Elections in Haryana
- Elections in India
- Lok Sabha
- Rajya Sabha
- Election Commission of India
