= Bhiwani–Mahendragarh Lok Sabha constituency =

Lok Sabha constituency in Haryana

Coordinates: 28.5°N 76.1°E

Bhiwani–Mahendragarh HR-8
- Lok Sabha constituency
- Interactive Map Outlining Bhiwani–Mahendragarh Lok Sabha constituency

Constituency details
- Country: India
- Region: North India
- State: Haryana
- Assembly constituencies: Loharu; Badhra; Dadri; Bhiwani; Tosham; Ateli; Mahendragarh; Narnaul; Nangal Chaudhry
- Established: 2008
- Reservation: None

Member of Parliament
- 18th Lok Sabha
- Incumbent Dharambir Singh Chaudhary
- Party: BJP
- Alliance: NDA
- Elected year: 2024

Bhiwani–Mahendragarh Lok Sabha constituency is one of the ten Lok Sabha (parliamentary) constituencies in Haryana state in northern India. This constituency came into existence in 2008 as a part of the implementation of the recommendations of the Delimitation Commission of India constituted in 2002.

This constituency was created by merging four assembly segments, Ateli, Mahendragarh, Narnaul and Nangal Chaudhry of the former Mahendragarh constituency and five assembly segments, Loharu, Badhra, Dadri, Bhiwani and Tosham of the erstwhile Bhiwani and Charkhi Dadri constituency. This constituency covers the major part of Bhiwani district and the entire Mahendragarh district.

== Assembly segments ==
At present, Bhiwani–Mahendragarh Lok Sabha constituency comprises nine Vidhan Sabha (legislative assembly) constituencies. These are:

| # | Name | District | Member | Party | Leading (in 2024) |
|---|---|---|---|---|---|
| 54 | Loharu | Bhiwani | Rajbir Singh Fartiya | INC | 8319 |
| 55 | Badhra | Charkhi Dadri | Umed Singh | BJP | 27102 |
| 56 | Dadri | Charkhi Dadri | Sunil Satpal Sangwan | BJP | 5281 |
| 57 | Bhiwani | Bhiwani | Ghanshyam Saraf | BJP | 28851 |
| 58 | Tosham | Bhiwani | Shruti Choudhry | BJP | 8068 |
| 68 | Ateli | Mahendragarh | Aarti Singh Rao | BJP | 19503 |
| 69 | Mahendragarh | Mahendragarh | Kanwar Singh Yadav | BJP | 4840 |
| 70 | Narnaul | Mahendragarh | Om Parkash Yadav | BJP | 17662 |
| 71 | Nangal Chaudhry | Mahendragarh | Manju Chaudhary | INC | 2592 |

== Members of Parliament ==
| Year | Winner | Party |
|---|---|---|
Till 2008: See Bhiwani and Mahendragarh
| 2009 | Shruti Choudhry | Indian National Congress |
| 2014 | Dharambir Singh Chaudhary | Bharatiya Janata Party |
| 2019 | Dharambir Singh Chaudhary | Bharatiya Janata Party |
| 2024 | Dharambir Singh Chaudhary | Bharatiya Janata Party |

== Election results ==
=== 2024 ===
2024 Indian general election: Bhiwani–Mahendragarh
| Party | Candidate | Votes | % | ±% |
|---|---|---|---|---|
| BJP | Dharambir Singh Chaudhary | 588,664 | 49.74 | ▼13.71 |
| INC | Rao Dan Singh | 547,154 | 46.24 | ▲21.07 |
| JJP | Bahadur Singh | 15,265 | 1.29 | ▼6.03 |
| BSP | Sunil Kumar Sharma | 6,336 | 0.54 | New |
| NOTA | None of the above | 5,287 | 0.45 | ▲0.27 |
| Majority | | 41,510 | 3.50 | ▼34.78 |
| Turnout | | 1,184,437 | 65.02 | ▼5.46 |
| BJP hold | | Swing | ▼13.71 | |

=== 2019 ===
2019 Indian general elections: Bhiwani–Mahendragarh
| Party | Candidate | Votes | % | ±% |
|---|---|---|---|---|
| BJP | Dharambir Singh Chaudhary | 736,699 | 63.45 | ▲24.19 |
| INC | Shruti Choudhry | 292,236 | 25.17 | ▼0.85 |
| JJP | Swati Yadav | 84,956 | 7.32 | New |
| INLD | Balwan Singh | 8,065 | 0.69 | ▼26.01 |
| NOTA | None of the above | 2,041 | 0.18 | ▼0.01 |
| Majority | | 444,463 | 38.28 | ▲25.72 |
| Turnout | | 1,165,906 | 70.48 | ▲0.51 |
| BJP hold | | Swing | | |

== Assembly segments ==
At present, Bhiwani–Mahendragarh Lok Sabha constituency comprises nine Vidhan Sabha (legislative assembly) constituencies. These are:

| # | Name | District | Leading (in 2019) |
|---|---|---|---|
| 54 | Loharu | Bhiwani | BJP |
| 55 | Badhra | Charkhi Dadri | BJP |
| 56 | Dadri | Charkhi Dadri | BJP |
| 57 | Bhiwani | Bhiwani | BJP |
| 58 | Tosham | Bhiwani | BJP |
| 68 | Ateli | Mahendragarh | BJP |
| 69 | Mahendragarh | Mahendragarh | BJP |
| 70 | Narnaul | Mahendragarh | BJP |
| 71 | Nangal Chaudhry | Mahendragarh | BJP |

=== 2014 ===
2014 Indian general elections: Bhiwani–Mahendragarh
| Party | Candidate | Votes | % | ±% |
|---|---|---|---|---|
| BJP | Dharambir Singh Chaudhary | 404,542 | 39.26 | ▲39.26 |
| INLD | Bahadur Singh | 275,148 | 26.70 | ▼1.90 |
| INC | Shruti Choudhry | 268,115 | 26.02 | ▼9.01 |
| BSP | Vedpal Tanwar | 27,834 | 2.70 | ▼4.41 |
| NOTA | None of the above | 1,994 | 0.19 | N/A |
| Majority | | 129,394 | 12.56 | ▲6.13 |
| Turnout | | 1,031,357 | 69.97 | ▼1.34 |
| BJP gain from INC | | Swing | | |

=== General elections 2009 ===
2009 Indian general elections: Bhiwani–Mahendragarh Bhiwani-Mahendragarh
| Party | Candidate | Votes | % | ±% |
|---|---|---|---|---|
| INC | Shruti Choudhry | 302,817 | 35.03 | |
| INLD | Ajay Singh Chautala | 247,240 | 28.60 | |
| HJC(BL) | Narender Singh | 214,161 | 24.74 | |
| BSP | Vikram Singh | 61,437 | 7.10 | |
| Majority | | 55,577 | 6.43 | |
| Turnout | | 865,017 | 71.34 | |
| INC win (new seat) | | | | |

== See also ==
- Bhiwani (Lok Sabha constituency)
- Mahendragarh (Lok Sabha constituency)
- List of constituencies of the Lok Sabha
