= Bhiwani =

- City
- Location in Haryana, India Bhiwani (India)
- Coordinates: 28.78°N 76.13°E
- Country: India
- State: Haryana
- District: Bhiwani

Government
  - Type: Municipal Council
  - Body: Bhiwani Municipal Council
- Elevation: 225 m (738 ft)

Population (2011)
  - Total: 196,057
  - Density: 380/km^{2} (980/sq mi)

Languages
  - Official: Hindi,haryanvi, Regional Haryanvi
- Time zone: UTC+5:30 (IST)
- PIN: 127021
- Telephone code: 91-1664
- ISO 3166 code: IN-HR
- Vehicle registration: HR-16; HR-61
- Website: bhiwani.nic.in

Bhiwani is a city and a municipal council in Bhiwani district in the state of Haryana. Besides being a seat of spiritual learning, the city is at the centre of regional politics and hometown of three former Haryana chief ministers: Bansi Lal, Banarsi Das Gupta and Hukum Singh. It is located 128 km west of national capital New Delhi.

The city has a conventional school of boxing, with almost all of the members of the Indian Boxing Squad coming from its Sports Authority of India (SAI) hostel. The late Capt. Hawa Singh, the legendary boxer, helped establish the boxing academy in Bhiwani.

Bhiwani is also known as Choti Kashi because of so many ancient Hindu temples in city like Kirorimal mandir, Khaki baba temple, Jogiwala mandir.

== History ==
=== Etymology ===
Bhiwani is a corrupted form of Bhani. The town was founded by a rajput chief called Neem Singh. His wife named Bhani once saved his life from treachery. Consequently, he named the town after her. The corrupted name of the town from Bhani to Bhiani (natives still use this pronunciation) eventually came to be known as Bhiwani. Other oral tradition avers that the town is named after the goddess Bhavani, the wife of Lord Shiva.

=== Early modern era ===
The old town had a protective wall with 12 gates which are ruined now, including Bapora Gate to the north-west, Rohtak Gate to the east, and Dadri Gate to the south-east. Buildings are in rajput architecture with pavilions and carved wood.

==== Samadhi ====
Samadhi of Todar Singh, is a samadhi (shrine) near Bichhwa lake. Mughal emperor Humayun came to Charkhi Dadri for hunting. Bhani Singh attacked a nearby Baliali village with Humayun's forces, which resulted in a retaliatory attack on Mughal forces by Jats of Bhiwani led by Todar Singh. Jats of Bhiwani were defeated and Todar was killed in the battle. Samadhi was built in his memory.

=== British era ===
In 1809, Bhiwani was annexed by the British Raj from the Maratha Empire. In 1817, William Frazer built a mandi (grain and goods market) here, resulting in the emergence of town as the regional hub of trade.

== Education ==
Bhiwani has six major institutes, one of them being the country's top and oldest textile research institute, the Technological Institute of Textile & Sciences, established by the Birla Group. There are also four-degree colleges (two of them are girls college) three colleges of education and a school of nursing. The Board of School Education, Haryana (BSEH) is also situated in the city while the government P.G College is located on Hansi road. Recently, the new Chaudhary Bansi Lal University has been established in Bhiwani in memory of the late Choudhary Bansi Laal.

== Transportation ==
=== Railways ===
Bhiwani railway Junction is on the Bathinda-Rewari line. It is a Junction of railway lines and three railway lines are originating from Bhiwani; one is towards the Rewari side. The second line towards Hisar side. The third branch line goes towards Rohtak and connects to Delhi.

=== Roads ===
The city is very well connected through state roadways with all the major towns in the region. District Bhiwani is situated in the western part of Haryana. It shares its boundary with the Jhunjhunu district of Rajasthan. Bus service is the major means of public transport in the Bhiwani district.

== Geography ==
Bhiwani is located at 28.78°N 76.13°E. It has an average elevation of 225 metres (738 ft). Bhiwani lies 285 kilometres (177 mi) from the state capital Chandigarh and 124 kilometres (77 mi) from the national capital Delhi.

== Development ==
Bhiwani was considered a deserted place. Farming could be done with the help of rain. After every two or three years, there would be a drought. Men, women, animals and birds suffered due to a lack of water and greenery. Things changed when in 1893 a canal was first constructed in Bhiwani.

During the late 18th century, early merchants like Seth Nand Ram Ji Katla Wale played a significant role in establishing Bhiwani as a growing trade and commercial hub through their contributions to infrastructure and community welfare.

It was a religious region, and gradually the people started taking part in politics and the Indian struggle for independence. Pandit Neki Ram, Fateh Chand, K.A. Desai and Babu Gupta accounted for the growth of a branch of the Congress party here in 1939.

== Satyagraha of Bardoli ==
In 1922 India's seekers of freedom society took part in the Bardoli Satyagraha. They were Neki Sharma, Uma Sharma, Ram Kumar, Gokul Chand, Fateh Chand, Lala Vith, Lala Karanji, Diwan Chand, Lala Moda, Mansingh Bohra etc. Neki Sharma Later known as Haryana Kesri.

== National leaders ==
Bhiwani was visited twice by Nehru, Madan Mohan Malviya and Mahatma Gandhi. Sardar Vallabhbhai Patel, Lala Lajpat Rai, Sh. Subash Chandra Bose, Smt. Sarojini Naidu, Dr. Munje, Dr. Ansari, Sh. Asif Ali, Ali Bandhu and Maulana Abdul Ghaffar Khan also came to Bhiwani, took meetings and praised Bhiwani's people for their taking part in the independence war.

Bhiwani is the home town of Renowned freedom-fighter and social-reformer Late Sh. Pt. Nekiram Sharma, Sh. Banarsi Das Gupta, (former Chief Minister of Haryana, Member of Parliament, Member of Legislative Assembly, Dy. Chief Minister, Speaker of Haryana Assembly and Minister in Haryana Cabinet) who also known for his contribution in Bhiwani by establishing many educational institutions like Adarsh Mahila Mahavidyalaya (awarded best women's college in Haryana), Vaish educations institutes (PG College, schools), Nature Cure Hospital (Prakritik Chikitsalya) Bhiwani and many more charitable and social organisations.

It is also the home town of Late Ch.Bansi Lal, former Chief Minister, Defense Minister, Railway Minister and Civil Aviation Minister, Ch Bansi Lal, who was a popular politician.

The former chief of Army Staff of the Indian army, General Vijay Kumar Singh is also from Bhiwani (Born: Village Bopara). Justice Raj Mohan Singh, Judge Punjab and Haryana High Court, also belongs to district Bhiwani.

Ghanshyam Saraf:Ghanshyam Saraf is the current MLA representing the Bhiwani Assembly constituency. He won the 2019 election on a BJP ticket.

== Boxing ==
The city entered the spotlight in 2008 as four of the five boxers who represented India at the 2008 Summer Olympics were from Bhiwani. Sports Authority of India coach and boxer, two times Asian Games gold medalist and 11-time national champion late captain Hawa Singh is credited with establishing the Bhiwani. Kavita Chahal won two times Aiba world women's boxing championship Chahal won 4 times Asian medals, With 8 times gold medalist she is the record holder in women's national championship. Boxing Club or "BBC" as it is known locally.

Among the 2008 Olympians, Jitender Kumar (Flyweight) (51 kilograms (112 lb)) and Akhil Kumar (54 kilograms (119 lb)) went on to qualify for the quarter-finals, while Vijender Singh (75 kilograms (165 lb)) won a bronze medal and Vikas Krishan Yadav from Bhiwani district won a gold medal in the 2010 Asian Games in the Lightweight category. In the 2010 Asian Games in Guangzhou, China, Vijender Singh claimed gold. Kavita Chahal first women boxer from Haryana Bhiwani got Arjun Award. Bhiwani is known as "Mini Cuba" in India due to the large number of boxers who hail from the region.

== Demographics ==
As of 2011 India census, Bhiwani had a population of 196,057. Males constitute 54% of the population and females 46%. Bhiwani has an average literacy rate of 69%, higher than the national average of 59.5%; with male literacy of 76% and female literacy of 62%. 13% of the population is under 7 years of age.

=== Religion ===
==== City ====
Religion in Bhiwani City
| Religion | Population (1911) | Percentage (1911) | Population (1941) | Percentage (1941) |
|---|---|---|---|---|
| Hinduism | 25,603 | 82.32% | 33,774 | 76.9% |
| Islam | 5,095 | 16.38% | 9,316 | 21.21% |
| Christianity | 52 | 0.17% | 160 | 0.36% |
| Sikhism | 13 | 0.04% | 360 | 0.82% |
| Others (Note: Including Jainism, Buddhism, Zoroastrianism, Judaism, Ad-Dharmis, or not stated) | 338 | 1.09% | 311 | 0.71% |
| Total Population | 31,100 | 100% | 43,921 | 100% |

==== Tehsil ====
Religion in Bhiwani Tehsil (1941)
| Religion | Population (1941) | Percentage (1941) |
|---|---|---|
| Hinduism | 127,740 | 80.55% |
| Islam | 29,554 | 18.64% |
| Sikhism | 533 | 0.34% |
| Christianity | 169 | 0.11% |
| Others (Note: Including Jainism, Buddhism, Zoroastrianism, Judaism, Ad-Dharmis, or not stated) | 591 | 0.37% |
| Total Population | 158,587 | 100% |

== Notable people ==
- Rohit Bhaker, Badminton player
- Kavita Chahal, boxer
- Arvind Kejriwal, Chief Minister of Delhi
- Dinesh Kumar, boxer
- Jitender Kumar, middleweight boxer born 1977
- Jitender Kumar, flyweight boxer born 1988
- Sushil Kumar, Freestyle wrestling, Gold medalist in World Championships 2010
- Bansi Lal, former Chief Minister of Haryana
- Geeta Phogat, Commonwealth Games Gold Medal winner in wrestling
- Vinesh Phogat, wrestler
- Richhpal Ram, Victoria Cross winner in World War-II
- Paramjeet Samota, Commonwealth Games Gold Medal winner in Boxing
- Pradeep Sangwan, cricketer
- Brijpal Singh, Colonel and Vir Chakra holder
- Jagdish Singh, boxer
- Hawa Singh, boxer
- Prithi Singh, Air Marshal
- V. K. Singh, COAS for Indian Army
- Vijender Singh, Olympic Bronze Medal winner in boxing
- Vikram Singh, Air Marshal
