= Bhiwani district =

Coordinates: 28.7833°N 76.1333°E

- District of Haryana
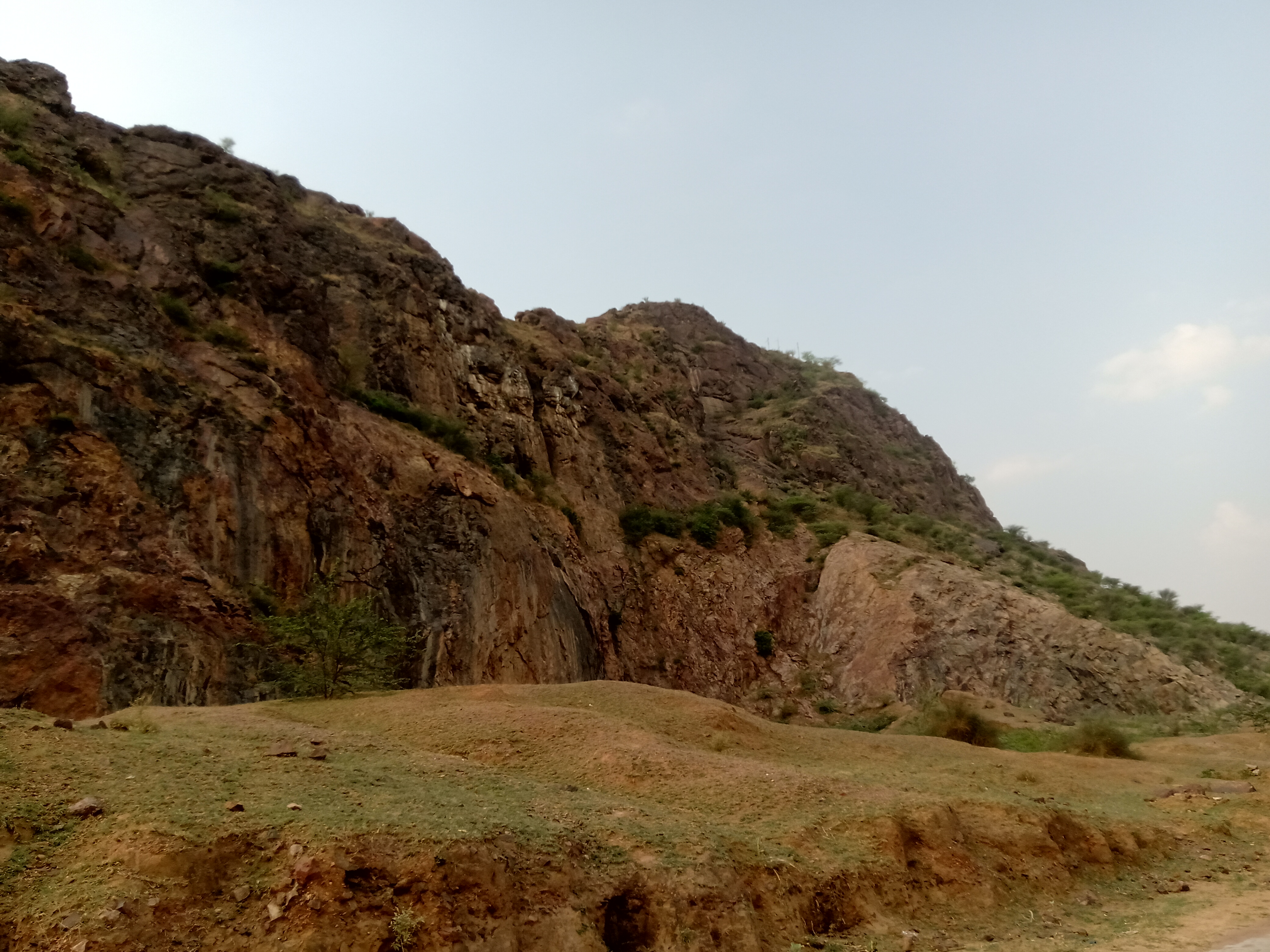
- Tosham Hills

- Location in Haryana
- Country: India
- State: Haryana
- Division: Rohtak
- Headquarters: Bhiwani
- Tehsils: 1. Bhiwani, 2. Bawani Khera, 3. Tosham, 4. Siwani, 5. Loharu

Government
  - Lok Sabha constituencies: 1. Bhiwani-Mahendragarh (shared with Charkhi Dadri and Mahendragarh districts), 2. Hisar (shared with Hisar and Jind districts)
  - Vidhan Sabha constituencies: 1. Bhiwani, 2. Loharu, 3. Tosham, 4. Bawani Khera

Area
  - Total: 3,432 km^{2} (1,325 sq mi)

Population (2011)
  - Total: 1,132,169
  - Density: 329.9/km^{2} (854.4/sq mi)
- Time zone: UTC+05:30 (IST)
- Website: https://bhiwani.gov.in/

Bhiwani district is one of the 23 districts of the northern Indian state of Haryana. Created on 22 December 1972, it was the largest district of the state by area before the creation of Charkhi Dadri as a separate district, as it occupied an area of 4,778 square kilometres (1,845 mi^{2}) and administered 442 villages with a population of 1,634,445. Sirsa is now the largest district of the state.

The district headquarters is the city of Bhiwani, which is around 124 kilometres (77 mi) from the national capital Delhi. Other major towns in the district are Siwani, Loharu, Tosham, Bawani Khera, Kohlawas, and Lamba.

As of 2011, it is the third most populous district of Haryana (out of 21) after Faridabad and Hisar.

== History ==
Pre-Indus Valley Civilization mine, smelt, and houses have been found at Khanak hills of Tosham Hill range. Excavations (1968–1973 and 1980–1986) in the village of Mitathal in Bhiwani have unearthed evidence of pre-Harappan and Harappan (Indus Valley Civilisation) culture in the area. Near the village of Naurangabad, about 10 kilometres (6.2 mi) east of Bhiwani city, preliminary diggings in 2001 revealed artefacts including coins, tools, sieves, toys, statues and pots up to 2,500 years old. According to archaeologists, the presence of coins, coin moulds, statues and design of the houses, suggests that a town existed here sometimes in the Kushan, Gupta and the Youdheya period till 300 BCE.

Bhiwani city is mentioned in the Ain-i-Akbari and has been a prominent centre of commerce since the time of the Mughals.

Wreckage of a Boeing 747, from Saudi Arabian Airlines Flight 763, fell in Bhiwani District as part of the Charkhi Dadri mid-air collision.

Naurangabad is an ancient archaeological mound.

== Divisions ==
The district comprises four sub-divisions: Bhiwani, Loharu, Siwani and Tosham. These sub-divisions are further divided into five Tehsils: Bhiwani, Loharu, Siwani, Bawani Khera and Tosham and one sub-tehsil, Behal.

There are four Vidhan Sabha constituencies in this district: Bhiwani, Loharu, Tosham and Bawani Khera. Bawani Khera is part of the Hisar (Lok Sabha constituency) while the rest are part of Bhiwani-Mahendragarh (Lok Sabha constituency).

Previously in Bhiwani district, sub-divisions Badhra and Charkhi Dadri and sub-tehsil Baund Kalan became part of the new Charkhi Dadri district in 2016.

== Demographics ==
Historical population
Year	Pop.	±% p.a.
1951	431,188	—
1961	555,889	+2.57%
1971	724,741	+2.69%
1981	947,374	+2.71%
1991	1,163,400	+2.08%
2001	1,425,022	+2.05%
2011	1,634,445	+1.38%

According to the 2011 census Bhiwani district has a population of 1,634,445, roughly equal to the nation of Guinea-Bissau or the US state of Idaho. This gives it a ranking of 306th in India (out of a total of 640). The district has a population density of 341 inhabitants per square kilometre (880/sq mi) . Its population growth rate over the decade 2001–2011 was 14.32%. Bhiwani has a sex ratio of 884 females for every 1000 males, and a literacy rate of 76.7%. After bifurcation the district has a population of 1,132,169. Scheduled Castes make up 251,736 (22.23%) of the population.

=== Religion ===
Religion in Bhiwani district (2011)
Religion	Percent
Hinduism	98.61%
Islam	0.82%
Other or not stated	0.57%

Religion in Bhiwani District (1941) (Note: 1941 figures are for Bhiwani Tehsil, which roughly matches present-day district borders. District was incorporated to take into account population increases during the post-independence era, which has resulted in various bifurcations of districts and tehsils across the historic Punjab Province region.)
Religion	Population (1941)	Percentage (1941)
Hinduism (Note: 1941 census: Including Ad-Dharmis)	127,740	80.55%
Islam	29,554	18.64%
Sikhism	533	0.34%
Christianity	169	0.11%
Others (Note: Including Jainism, Buddhism, Zoroastrianism, Judaism, or not stated)	591	0.37%
Total Population	158,587	100%

=== Languages ===
Languages of Bhiwani district (2011)
1. Haryanvi (80.0%)
2. Hindi (18.1%)
3. Others (1.90%)

At the time of the 2011 Census of India, 79.98% of the population in the district spoke Haryanvi and 18.12% Hindi as their first language.

== Education ==
=== Degree colleges ===
- Adarsh Mahila Mahavidyalya
- Rajiv Gandhi College for Women
- Raja Neempal Singh Govt College
- Vaish P.G. College

=== Technological colleges ===
- BRCM College of Engineering
- Bhiwani Institute of Technology and Sciences
- Technological Institute of Textile & Sciences

=== University ===
- Chaudhary Bansi Lal University

== Religious places ==
- Kirorimal Mandir—Located in the heart of the city, temple of Vishnu.
- Shri Khakhi Baba Mandir - Located on the bank of Tal. The whole Ramayana is inscribed on its walls.
- Shri Jogi Wala Math - Devoted to Shiva and associated to Naath Pant.
- Shri Jahargir Mandir - Devoted to Shiva and associated to Giri Pant.
- Shri Bhoja Wali Devi Mandir - Devoted to Durga, also known as 84 Ghantiyon Wala Mandir (84 Bells Temple).
- Dhareru Dhaam - It is a village 12 km far from the district. Dedicated to Shyam Baba
- Devsar Dhaam - It is located on a hillock on Bhiwani-Luharu road. It has a temple devoted to the goddess Vaishno Devi.
- Manheru Dhaam - It is a village 11 km far from the district. There is a temple of Balaji Maharaj (Hanuman).
- BABA PURNA GIRI DHAAM -It is located at Nandgaon, village of Bhiwani, Haryana. It is 18 km from district HQ.
- Seth Mool Chand Mandir—Devoted to Lord Rama on the bank of Mool Chand ka Talab, it is a 200-year-old temple with a rare Shaligram Idol of Shree Ram. It was one of the first Black Ram idols in Bhiwani.
- Dadu Dayalu Mandir - This esteemed temple is dedicated to Saint Dadu Dayal and is situated at Patram Gate. Additionally, the chhatri of Seth Patramdas Ji Nandram Katla Wale graces the temple premises, enhancing its significance and spiritual ambiance.

== Sports ==
Sports played in the area include wrestling, volleyball, boxing and running. Hawa Singh won the Asian Games gold medal in Heavyweight category in consecutive editions of the games in the 1966 Asiad and the 1970 Asiad. Bhiwani has emerged as a centre of Indian boxing as all four boxers representing India at Beijing Olympics 2008 are products of Sports Authority of India (SAI) boxing hostel at Bhiwani. To top that three of them Akhil Kumar, Vijender Singh and Jitender Kumar reached the quarterfinals of their respective categories. While Akhil Kumar and Jitender Kumar lost in their respective quarterfinals bouts Vijender Singh qualified to the semifinals thereby ensuring India's first ever Boxing medal (Bronze) in the 2012 Summer Olympics. Paramjeet Samota who won a gold for India in the 2010 Commonwealth Games also lives in a large village called Dinod in the Bhiwani district.

== Notable people ==
- Rohit Bhaker - Badminton Player
- Banarsi Das Gupta - Former Chief Minister of Haryana
- Dinesh Kumar - Boxer
- Jitender Kumar (flyweight boxer)
- Jitender Kumar (middleweight boxer)
- Arvind Kejriwal - Chief Minister of Delhi
- Bansi Lal - Former Chief Minister of Haryana and former Minister of Defence of India
- Richhpal Ram - Victoria Cross winner in World War-II
- Paramjeet Samota - Boxer
- Brijpal Singh, Vir Chakra
- Hawa Singh - heavyweight boxer, Asian Games gold medal winner
- Hukam Singh - Former Chief Minister of Haryana
- Jagdish Singh - Boxer
- Air Marshal Prithi Singh
- Vijay Kumar Singh PVSM, AVSM, YSM, ADC - COAS of Indian Army
- Vijender Singh - Olympic Bronze medal winner in boxing
- Air MarshalVikram Singh

== Villages ==
- See List of villages in Bhiwani district.
