= Saini ministry =

Saini ministry may refer to these cabinets led by Indian politician Nayab Singh Saini as Chief Minister of Haryana:

- First Saini ministry the government of Haryana headed by Nayab Singh Saini from March 2024 to October 2024
- Second Saini ministry the government of Haryana headed by Nayab Singh Saini from October 2024 to present
