= Naraingarh Assembly constituency =

Coordinates: 30°28′35″N 77°07′40″E

- Constituency No. 3 for the Haryana Legislative Assembly

Constituency details
- Country: India
- Region: North India
- State: Haryana
- District: Ambala
- Lok Sabha constituency: Ambala
- Established: 1967
- Total electors: 1,92,340
- Reservation: None

Member of Legislative Assembly
- 15th Haryana Legislative Assembly
- Incumbent Shalley Chaudhary
- Party: INC
- Elected year: 2024

Naraingarh Assembly constituency (also: Narayangarh) is one of the 90 assembly seats of Haryana in the Ambala district of the Indian state of Haryana.

Shalley Chaudhary is the current MLA from Naraingarh Assembly constituency.

== Members of Legislative Assembly ==
Year	Member	Party
1957	Sadhu Ram saini	Indian National Congress
1957	Roshan Lal	Indian National Congress
1962	Jagjit Singh	Independent
1967	Lal Singh	Indian National Congress
1968	Lal Singh	Indian National Congress
1972	Jagjit Singh	Indian National Congress
1977	Lal Singh	Janata Party
1982	Lal Singh	Independent
1987	Jagpal Singh	Independent
1991	Surjeet Kumar	Bahujan Samaj Party
1996	Raj Kumar Saini	Haryana Vikas Party
2000	Pawan Kumar	Indian National Lok Dal
2005	Ram Kishan	Indian National Congress
2009	Ram Kishan	Indian National Congress
2014	Nayab Singh Saini	Bharatiya Janata Party
2019	Shalley Chaudhary	Indian National Congress
2024	Shalley Chaudhary	Indian National Congress

== Election results ==
=== Assembly Election 2024 ===
2024 Haryana Legislative Assembly election: Naraingarh
Party	Candidate	Votes	%	±%
INC	Shalley Chaudhary	62,180	44.01	▲4.45
BJP	Dr. Pawan Saini	47,086	33.33	▲9.01
BSP	Harbilas Singh	27,440	19.42	▲13.56
AAP	Gurpal Singh	3,261	2.31	New
NOTA	None of the Above	410	0.29	New
Margin of victory		15,094	10.68	▼4.56
Turnout		1,41,289	73.61	▼0.61
Registered electors		1,92,340		▲5.39
INC hold		Swing	▲4.45	

=== Assembly Election 2019 ===
2019 Haryana Legislative Assembly election: Naraingarh
Party	Candidate	Votes	%	±%
INC	Shalley Chaudhary	53,470	39.56	+17.12
BJP	Surender Singh	32,870	24.32	−15.44
JJP	Ram Singh Dhillon	18,753	13.87	
LSP	Gulshan Kumar	15,454	11.43	
BSP	Madan Pal	7,926	5.86	−15.99
INLD	Jagmal Singh Rolloyo	2,242	1.66	−10.31
Independent	Gurpal Singh	2,203	1.63	
Independent	Mahender Singh	617	0.46	
Margin of victory		20,600	15.24	−2.08
Turnout		1,35,172	74.21	−8.75
Registered electors		1,82,142		+7.42
INC gain from BJP		Swing	-0.20	

=== Assembly Election 2014 ===
2014 Haryana Legislative Assembly election: Naraingarh
Party	Candidate	Votes	%	±%
BJP	Nayab Singh Saini	55,931	39.76	+32.80
INC	Ram Kishan	31,570	22.44	−9.69
BSP	Ram Singh Korwa	30,736	21.85	+8.58
INLD	Jagmal Singh Rollon	16,836	11.97	−12.99
HJC(BL)	Bhoom Singh	3,101	2.20	−0.40
Margin of victory		24,361	17.32	+10.15
Turnout		1,40,675	82.97	+1.07
Registered electors		1,69,556		19.62
BJP gain from INC		Swing	+7.63	

=== Assembly Election 2009 ===
2009 Haryana Legislative Assembly election: Naraingarh
Party	Candidate	Votes	%	±%
INC	Ram Kishan	37,298	32.13	−11.61
INLD	Ram Singh	28,978	24.96	−10.47
BSP	Arjun Singh	15,404	13.27	+7.36
Independent	Raj Kumar	14,742	12.70	
BJP	Nayab Singh	8,082	6.96	−2.41
Independent	Madan Pal	4,187	3.61	
HJC(BL)	Bhoom Singh	3,028	2.61	
Independent	Mulakh Raj	2,115	1.82	
Independent	Sudesh Kumar Bhardwaj	912	0.79	
IJP	Shamsher Singh Arya	519	0.45	
Margin of victory		8,320	7.17	−1.14
Turnout		1,16,092	81.90	+4.24
Registered electors		1,41,746		+17.78
INC hold		Swing	-11.61	

=== Assembly Election 2005 ===
2005 Haryana Legislative Assembly election: Naraingarh
Party	Candidate	Votes	%	±%
INC	Ram Kishan	40,877	43.73	14.17
INLD	Pawan Kumar	33,114	35.43	−3.05
BJP	Sumer Chand	8,756	9.37	
BSP	Satpal Saini	5,519	5.90	−2.11
BRP	Mahender Pal Singh	1,445	1.55	
NCP	Nathi Ram	1,008	1.08	0.65
Independent	Harbans Kaur	743	0.79	
Independent	Sugan Chand	563	0.60	
LJP	Jaspal Singh	489	0.52	
Independent	Suraja Ram	393	0.42	
Margin of victory		7,763	8.31	−0.61
Turnout		93,467	77.66	1.56
Registered electors		1,20,352		9.07
INC gain from INLD		Swing	5.26	

=== Assembly Election 2000 ===
2000 Haryana Legislative Assembly election: Naraingarh
Party	Candidate	Votes	%	±%
INLD	Pawan Kumar	32,092	38.47	
INC	Lal Singh	24,659	29.56	16.06
Independent	Raj Kumar	15,258	18.29	
BSP	Man Singh	6,689	8.02	−9.39
Independent	Sunder Singh	3,035	3.64	
Independent	Sukhbir Singh	451	0.54	
NCP	Ravinder Singh	358	0.43	
Independent	Banarsi Dass	330	0.40	
Margin of victory		7,433	8.91	−0.91
Turnout		83,411	76.10	−1.98
Registered electors		1,10,347		2.09
INLD gain from HVP		Swing	16.04	

=== Assembly Election 1996 ===
1996 Haryana Legislative Assembly election: Naraingarh
Party	Candidate	Votes	%	±%
HVP	Raj Kumar	22,309	27.23	24.68
BSP	Man Singh S/O Pirthi Chand	14,262	17.41	−5.03
SAP	Ram Singh	14,015	17.11	
INC	Om Parkash	11,059	13.50	−2.33
Independent	Subhash Chand	4,772	5.83	
Independent	Ram Kishan	4,527	5.53	
AIIC(T)	Ashok Kumar	2,453	2.99	
Independent	Narender Nath	1,671	2.04	
Independent	Sharda Rani	1,000	1.22	
Independent	Jagpal Singh Chaudhry	966	1.18	
Independent	Surjit Kumar	593	0.72	
Margin of victory		8,047	9.82	3.21
Turnout		81,917	78.08	3.41
Registered electors		1,08,085		13.29
HVP gain from BSP		Swing	4.80	

=== Assembly Election 1991 ===
1991 Haryana Legislative Assembly election: Naraingarh
Party	Candidate	Votes	%	±%
BSP	Surjeet Kumar	15,407	22.44	
INC	Ashok Kumar	10,869	15.83	2.66
BJP	Bharat Bhushan	9,982	14.54	2.15
JP	Jagpal Singh Chaudhry	7,917	11.53	
Independent	Vinod Kumar	7,581	11.04	
Independent	Lal Singh	6,403	9.32	
Independent	Hathi Singh	4,447	6.48	
HVP	Roshan Lal Arya	1,756	2.56	
Independent	Preetpal Singh	1,301	1.89	
Independent	Jaipal	697	1.02	
Independent	Bhacmal	554	0.81	
Margin of victory		4,538	6.61	−12.20
Turnout		68,668	74.67	−2.96
Registered electors		95,404		13.44
BSP gain from Independent		Swing	-15.60	

=== Assembly Election 1987 ===
1987 Haryana Legislative Assembly election: Naraingarh
Party	Candidate	Votes	%	±%
Independent	Jagpal Singh	24,456	38.04	
LKD	Sadhu Ram	12,363	19.23	
Independent	Lakchhman Singh	8,779	13.66	
INC	Lal Singh	8,468	13.17	−13.33
BJP	Kutar Singh	7,963	12.39	−4.50
VHP	Om Parkash	553	0.86	
Independent	Nakul	496	0.77	
Independent	Gain Chand	479	0.75	
Independent	Sumer Chand	319	0.50	
Margin of victory		12,093	18.81	10.68
Turnout		64,288	77.63	2.83
Registered electors		84,099		18.10
Independent hold		Swing	3.41	

=== Assembly Election 1982 ===
1982 Haryana Legislative Assembly election: Naraingarh
Party	Candidate	Votes	%	±%
Independent	Lal Singh	18,091	34.63	
INC	Jagjit Singh	13,842	26.50	−3.52
BJP	Bharat Bhushan	8,822	16.89	
Independent	Sadhu Ram	4,809	9.21	
Independent	Aman Kumar	3,550	6.80	
Independent	Kanta Ram	2,352	4.50	
Independent	Om Prakash Sen	276	0.53	
Margin of victory		4,249	8.13	−12.13
Turnout		52,238	74.80	6.10
Registered electors		71,209		15.72
Independent gain from JP		Swing	-15.65	

=== Assembly Election 1977 ===
1977 Haryana Legislative Assembly election: Naraingarh
Party	Candidate	Votes	%	±%
JP	Lal Singh	20,909	50.28	
INC	Jagjit Singh	12,482	30.02	−21.21
Independent	Maharaj Singh	5,523	13.28	
Independent	Faquir Chand	1,938	4.66	
Independent	Ram Nath	450	1.08	
Independent	Durga Das	282	0.68	
Margin of victory		8,427	20.27	3.21
Turnout		41,584	68.70	−0.03
Registered electors		61,536		−4.17
JP gain from INC		Swing	-0.95	

=== Assembly Election 1972 ===
1972 Haryana Legislative Assembly election: Naraingarh
Party	Candidate	Votes	%	±%
INC	Jagjit Singh	21,818	51.23	−14.23
Independent	Sadhu Ram	14,556	34.18	
Independent	Balwant	3,688	8.66	
Independent	Nand Lal	1,717	4.03	
Independent	Meet Singh	810	1.90	
Margin of victory		7,262	17.05	−32.49
Turnout		42,589	68.72	27.86
Registered electors		64,216		12.48
INC hold		Swing	-14.23	

=== Assembly Election 1968 ===
1968 Haryana Legislative Assembly election: Naraingarh
Party	Candidate	Votes	%	±%
INC	Lal Singh	14,745	65.46	20.11
BKD	Jagat Narain	3,585	15.92	
ABJS	Raghu Nath Saroop	2,596	11.52	−11.65
VHP	Shiv Raj Singh	1,108	4.92	
Independent	Sawan Ram	491	2.18	
Margin of victory		11,160	49.54	27.36
Turnout		22,525	40.86	−29.16
Registered electors		57,091		1.83
INC hold		Swing	20.11	

=== Assembly Election 1967 ===
1967 Haryana Legislative Assembly election: Naraingarh
Party	Candidate	Votes	%	±%
INC	L. Singh	16,691	45.35	
ABJS	R. N. Sarup	8,528	23.17	
RPI	N. Lal	6,816	18.52	
SWA	S. Ram	2,291	6.23	
Independent	G. Singh	1,541	4.19	
Independent	B. Parshad	936	2.54	
Margin of victory		8,163	22.18	
Turnout		36,803	70.03	
Registered electors		56,067		
INC win (new seat)				
