= Shruti Choudhry =

Indian politician (born 1975)

Cabinet Minister in Haryana
- Incumbent
- Assumed office 17 October 2024
- Governor: Bandaru Dattatreya; Ashim Kumar Ghosh
- Chief Minister: Nayab Singh Saini
- Ministry and Departments: Women & Child Development; Irrigation & Water Resources

Member of Haryana Legislative Assembly
- Incumbent
- Assumed office 8 October 2024
- Preceded by: Kiran Choudhry
- Constituency: Tosham

Member of Parliament, Lok Sabha
- In office 2009–2014
- Preceded by: Kuldeep Bishnoi
- Succeeded by: Dharambir Singh Chaudhary
- Constituency: Bhiwani-Mahendragarh, Haryana

Personal details
- Born: 3 October 1975 (age 51) New Delhi, Delhi, India
- Party: Bharatiya Janata Party (since 2024)
- Other political affiliations: Indian National Congress (2005–2024)
- Spouse: Arunabh Choudhry
- Parents: Surender Singh (father); Kiran Choudhry (mother)
- As of 2 June, 2009

Shruti Choudhry (born 3 October 1975) is an Indian politician from Haryana belonging to the Bharatiya Janata Party. Since October 2024, she has been serving as a Cabinet Minister in the Government of Haryana after being elected as a Member of the Legislative Assembly (MLA) from Tosham Assembly constituency.

Choudhry is the granddaughter of the former Chief Minister of Haryana, Bansi Lal. From 2005 to 2024, she was a member of the Indian National Congress and represented Bhiwani-Mahendragarh (Lok Sabha constituency) in the Indian Parliament from 2009 to 2014.

== Early life ==
Shruti Choudhry was born in New Delhi on 3 October 1975. Her parents are Ch. Surender Singh and Kiran Choudhry, both of whom served as ministers in the Government of Haryana. Surender Singh served as a member of both the Lok Sabha and the Rajya Sabha, while Kiran Choudhry served in the Haryana Legislative Assembly and was subsequently elected to the Rajya Sabha.

Her paternal grandfather, Ch. Bansi Lal, served four times as the Chief Minister of Haryana, held office as the Defence Minister of India and founded the Haryana Vikas Party. Her maternal grandfather was Brigadier Atma Singh, a war veteran who raised the Indian Army's 17 Kumaon Regiment in 1968 and was described as its founding father. Her family is among the major political families of Haryana, with a significant contribution to the development of Haryana and the nation.

Shurti's early education was at the Convent of Jesus and Mary and Delhi Public School, R. K. Puram. She earned a B.A. (Honours) in Political Science from the University of Delhi; and LL.B. from B. R. Ambedkar University, Agra. On 7 March 2003, she married Arunabh Chowdhury, a senior advocate at the Supreme Court of India.

== Political career ==
At first practising as a lawyer, Choudhry turned to politics following the death of her father in 2005. Choudhry was chosen by the Indian National Congress party to contest the 2009 Indian general election in the Bhiwani-Mahendragarh constituency of the Lok Sabha. Mainly as a consequence of the goodwill that existed for her family in the area, she defeated her nearest rival, Ajay Singh Chautala of the Indian National Lok Dal, by a margin of 55,097 votes. Her grandfather had previously won the same seat three times, and her father had done so twice. During her tenure as a member of Parliament (2009-2014), Choudhry served on the Lok Sabha committees for agriculture and empowerment of women from 2009. She did not win re-election to the Lok Sabha seat in 2014.

In the 2024 Lok Sabha Elections, the Congress fielded a Hooda loyalist, Rao Dan Singh, instead of Shruti Choudhry from the Bhiwani-Mahendragarh seat. In June 2024, she and her mother, Kiran Choudhry, quit the Congress party due to the growing differences with the party leader and ex-Chief Minister Bhupinder Singh Hooda. Subsequently, both of them joined the BJP on 19 June 2024, in the presence of several state BJP leaders including Chief Minister Nayab Singh Saini and former CM Manohar Lal Khattar.

After joining BJP, Choudhry said that she was inspired by Prime Minister Modi, who has made "India's name shine across the world," and that earlier Modi and Khattar had also worked along with Chaudhary Bansi Lal. There were mixed reactions from the Congress party over Choudhry and her mother's exit, where some leaders called it a loss for the party, while others asserted that it won't make any difference. According to political analysts, Choudhry's induction may help BJP's standing among the Jat community while also expanding its base in the Bhiwani region.

In October 2024, Shruti Choudhry won from the Tosham Assembly constituency in the 2024 Haryana assembly elections by defeating the Congress candidate by 14257 votes.

== See also ==
- Political families of Haryana
- Politics of Haryana
