= Kiran Choudhry =

Indian politician (born 1955)

Kiran Choudhary
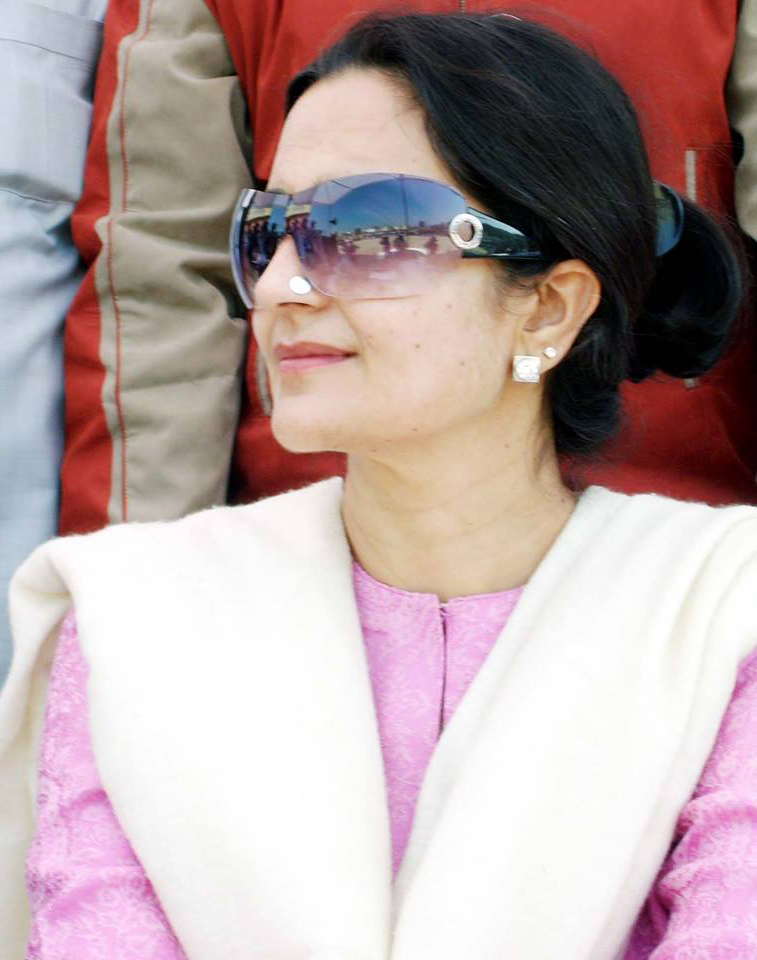

Member of Parliament, Rajya Sabha
- In office 3 September 2024 – 9 April 2026
- Preceded by: Deepender Singh Hooda
- Succeeded by: Sanjay Bhatia
- Constituency: Haryana

Member of Haryana Legislative Assembly
- In office 22 November 2005 — 8 October 2024
- Preceded by: Surender Singh
- Succeeded by: Shruti Choudhry
- Constituency: Tosham

Personal details
- Born: 5 June 1955 (age 70) Lado Sarai Village , New Delhi, Delhi, India
- Party: Bharatiya Janata Party (since 2024)
- Other political affiliations: Indian National Congress (until 2024)
- Spouse: Surender Singh (m. 1972; died 2005)
- Children: Shruti Choudhry (daughter)

Kiran Choudhary (born 5 June 1955) is an Indian politician from Haryana, who served as a Member of Parliament in the Rajya Sabha with the Bharatiya Janata Party from 2024 till 2026.

She is a five-time former Member of the legislative assembly of Delhi from Delhi Cantt and Haryana Legislative Assembly (1998-2003) and from Tosham (Bhiwani) (2005-2024) under the Indian National Congress, preceded by her late husband, Surender Singh. Her father-in-law, Bansi Lal has served as the Chief Minister of Haryana three times.

Originally a member of the Indian National Congress, she joined the Bharatiya Janata Party in June 2024.

== Political career ==
Kiran Choudhry started her electoral politics from Delhi. She contested and won in 1993 Delhi Legislative Assembly Election from Delhi Cantt but lost to Karan Singh Tanwar by 8,869 votes, then in 1998 she gained the seat from the same opponent by 2,626 votes, again lost to him in 2003 by 3,766 votes.

In June 2004 she contested Rajya Sabha election from Haryana as INC candidate but lost to Tarlochan Singh who got elected as Independent Candidate.

Choudhry entered Haryana electoral politics following the death of her husband and Bansi Lal's son, Surender Singh, in 2005. Choudhry became known as the daughter-in-law of former Haryana CM Bansi Lal, and got elected from Tosham (Bhiwani) on 5 June 2005 till 20 August 2024.

In June 2024, she and her daughter, Shruti Choudhry, quit the Congress party due to differences with the party leader and ex-Chief Minister Bhupinder Singh Hooda. The differences had heightened during the 2024 Lok Sabha Elections, when the Congress fielded a Hooda loyalist, Rao Dan Singh, instead of Choudhry's daughter, Shruti Choudhry, a former MP from the Bhiwani-Mahendragarh parliamentary seat. Subsequently, both of them joined the BJP on June 19, 2024, in the presence of former CM Manohar Lal Khattar. After joining the BJP, Choudhry claimed she was inspired by Prime Minister Modi's vision to develop India by 2047.

There were mixed reactions to her leaving the Congress party, wherein senior Congress MP Selja Kumari expressed regret over Choudhry's leaving and called it a loss for the party. Another Congress MP attacked Choudhry, asserting it won't affect Congress as women could not be political heirs. According to political analysts, as Choudhry belongs to the Jat community, she may help improve BJP's standing among the community, which makes up almost a fourth of the state's population, while also expanding influence in the Bhiwani region, where her late father-in-law Bansi Lal enjoys respect.

She got elected to Rajya Sabha as BJP candidate on 27 August 2024 for 2 years, by-election was held as Deepender Singh Hooda got elected to Lok Sabha from Rohtak and resigned as Rajya Sabha MP on 4 June.

== Electoral performance ==
2019 Haryana Legislative Assembly election: Tosham
| Party | Candidate | Votes | % | ±% |
|---|---|---|---|---|
| INC | Kiran Choudhry | 72,699 | 49.72 | ▲11.26 |
| BJP | Shashi Ranjan Parmar | 54,640 | 37.37 | ▲36.17 |
| JJP | Sita Ram | 7,522 | 5.14 | New |
| BSP | Narender Lara | 4,513 | 3.09 | ▲1.78 |
| INLD | Kamla Rani | 2,094 | 1.43 | ▼23.99 |
| AAP | Pawan Hindustani | 865 | 0.59 | New |
| Margin of victory | | 18,059 | 12.35 | ▼0.69 |
| Turnout | | 1,46,204 | 69.93 | ▼11.45 |
| Registered electors | | 2,09,063 | | ▲12.42 |
| INC hold | | Swing | ▲11.26 | |

2014 Haryana Legislative Assembly election: Tosham
| Party | Candidate | Votes | % | ±% |
|---|---|---|---|---|
| INC | Kiran Choudhry | 58,218 | 38.46 | ▼19.16 |
| INLD | Kamla Rani | 38,477 | 25.42 | ▲10.45 |
| Independent | Rajbir Singgh Lala | 38,427 | 25.39 | New |
| HJC(BL) | Ved Pal Tanwar | 5,907 | 3.90 | ▼9.27 |
| BSP | Jai Bhagwan | 1,971 | 1.30 | ▼6.44 |
| BJP | Gunpal | 1,822 | 1.20 | ▼2.00 |
| Margin of victory | | 19,741 | 13.04 | ▼29.61 |
| Turnout | | 1,51,357 | 81.39 | ▲13.19 |
| Registered electors | | 1,85,970 | | ▲17.33 |
| INC hold | | Swing | ▼19.16 | |

2009 Haryana Legislative Assembly election: Tosham
| Party | Candidate | Votes | % | ±% |
|---|---|---|---|---|
| INC | Kiran Choudhry | 62,290 | 57.63 | ▼41.73 |
| INLD | Col. Gajraj Singh | 16,183 | 14.97 | New |
| HJC(BL) | Kamal Singh | 14,233 | 13.17 | New |
| BSP | Narender Lara | 8,369 | 7.74 | New |
| BJP | Meena Kumari | 3,460 | 3.20 | New |
| Margin of victory | | 46,107 | 42.66 | ▼56.43 |
| Turnout | | 1,08,088 | 68.19 | ▼20.63 |
| Registered electors | | 1,58,501 | | ▲11.14 |
| INC hold | | Swing | ▼41.73 | |

2005 Haryana Legislative Assembly by-election: Tosham
| Party | Candidate | Votes | % | ±% |
|---|---|---|---|---|
| INC | Kiran Choudhry | 125,858 | 99.36 | ▲45.39 |
| Independent | Mangal Singh Khreta | 338 | 0.27 | New |
| Independent | Jitendra | 208 | 0.16 | New |
| Margin of victory | | 1,25,520 | 99.09 | ▲77.86 |
| Turnout | | 1,26,674 | 88.82 | ▲14.14 |
| Registered electors | | 1,42,617 | | |
| INC hold | | Swing | | |

== See also ==
- Haryana Forestry case
- Dynastic politics of Haryana
