= Chandrawati =

Indian politician (1928–2020)

Chandrawati Sheoran

Member of the Parliament, Lok Sabha
- In office 1977–1980
- Preceded by: Not available
- Succeeded by: Bansi Lal
- Constituency: Bhiwani constituency

Personal details
- Born: 3 September 1928 Dalawas Village, Charkhi Dadri,
- Died: 15 November 2020 (aged 92) Pt. B.D. Sharma PGIMS Rohtak
- Party: Indian National Congress
- Other political affiliations: Janata Party, Lok Dal, Vishal Haryana Party

Chandrawati Sheoran (3 September 1928 – 15 November 2020) was an Advocate, Indian politician and activist who served as an M.P. (member of parliament), 6 times M.L.A. and also as the Lieutenant Governor of Puducherry.

== Early life ==
Chandrawati Sheoran was born in 1928 in the Jat family of Hawaldar Hajari Ram Sheoran S/O Mohar Singh. Her father served in the Indian Army. Her mother was Dhaula Bai from village Ghardana Kalan in Jhunjhunu district of Rajasthan. Her mother Dhaula Bai died in 1932 when Chandrawati was aged four. Her father Hawaldar Hazari Ram died in 1944 at the age of 57 when she was getting education at Pilani. It is interesting to note that she was married as per traditions in early childhood along with her elder sister but she was not sent to her in-laws due to her tender age. After a few years her spouse died but Chandrawati was unaware of these facts at that time.

== Political career ==
She was the first woman member of Haryana Vidhan Sabha and also the first woman member of parliament from Haryana.

She was Lieutenant Governor of Puducherry from 19 February 1990 to 18 December 1990.

Earlier, she was a minister (1964–66 and 1972–74) in the Government of Haryana.

In 1977, she was elected to the 6th Lok Sabha as MP for the Bhiwani constituency as a Janata Party candidate, defeating Defense Minister Bansi Lal.

During 1964–66 and 1972–74 she was Minister of State in Haryana, 1977–79 President of Janata Party and 1982–85 Leader of the Opposition, and later a senior Indian National Congress leader in Haryana.

She fought her first Assembly election from Badhra constituency, then in Mahendragarh district of the then Pepsu, as a Congress nominee in 1954 and won it.

She was Parliamentary Secretary in Pepsu Govt.

She was elected as M.L.A. in 1962.

She was elected as M.L.A. in 1968 (Loharu).

She was elected as M.L.A. again in 1972.

She served as Minister of state in Haryana from 1972 to 1974.

During her tenure in assemblies, she worked in Estimate Committees initially as its member in Punjab and then its Chair-Person in Haryana. She was also Chair-Person of the Library Committee in Haryana. She functioned as a member of the Pradesh Congress Committee in Punjab and then in Haryana till 1977.

She was elected to Lok Sabha in 1977 first time defeating Bansi Lal and remained its member till August 1979. During this period, she was a member of the Central Executive Committee of Janta Party in Lok Sabha and also a Member of the Public Undertaking Committee.

She was President of the ruling Haryana Janta from 1974 to 1979.

She was elected as M.L.A. fifth time in 1982 as Lokdal candidate.

Smt. Chandrawati worked as Neta Virodhi Dal from 1982 to 1985.

She was elected in 1991 as a 6 times M.L.A. from Loharu. She also actively participated in Nayaya Yatra (March for Justice) launched under the guidance of Ch. Devilal, to get justice for Haryana.

She fought 13 elections: 2 of MP and 11 of Assembly, out of which she won 7 elections.

== Obituary ==
tribuneindia.com

Tribune News Service
Hisar, November 15, 2020:

Former lieutenant governor of Puducherry Chandrawati, who stormed the Haryana's political scene when she defeated then defence minister Bansi Lal on his home turf Bhiwani in the 1977 general election in the shadow of the emergency, died at the Rohtak's PGIMS in on Sunday (15 November 2020) morning.

She was 92. She had been ill for a long time.

Chandrawati, a native of Bhiwani's Dalawas village, has a number of firsts to her credit. She was the state's first woman to become a Member of Parliament (1977), the first woman minister in Haryana (1964–66) and the first woman Leader of Opposition (1982–85). She was also the first enrolled advocate from the state.

Later, Chandrawati entered politics. She became an MLA from Badhra in 1954 in undivided Punjab. In 1982, she was again elected from the segment on the Lok Dal ticket.

In the 1968 and 1972 Assembly elections, she won from Loharu on the Congress ticket.

Chandrawati left the Congress after she was sacked from the Cabinet by then Chief Minister Bansi Lal in 1974. Subsequently, she joined the anti-Congress forces (Lok Dal, Janata Party and later Janata Dal).

Kanwar Pal Joon, a relative and close aide of Chandrawati, recalled that Indira Gandhi used to like her very much and called her Chandro.

“Chandrawati told me once that Indira Gandhi had asked her to join back the Congress and assured her the CM post. But Chandrawati opted to stay with the Janata Party,” he said.

Leaders express grief

Chandigarh: CM Manohar Lal Khattar and Leader of Opposition Bhupinder Singh Hooda have expressed condolences to the family of former Lt. Governor of Puducherry Chandrawati on her demise. TNS
