= First Saini ministry =

Ministry of Haryana since 2024

- Ministry of the State of Haryana
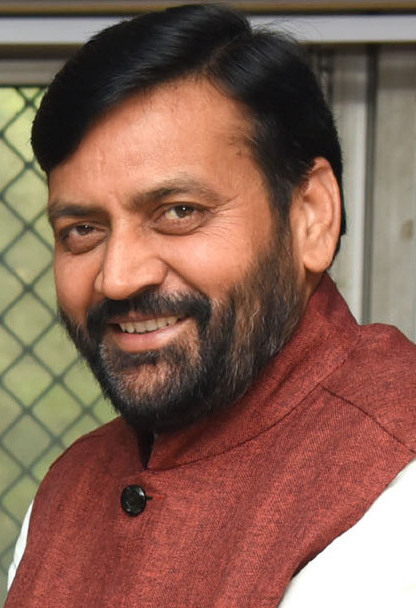
- Date formed: 12 March 2024
- Date dissolved: 17 October 2024

People and organisations
- Head of state: Governor Bandaru Dattatreya
- Head of government: Nayab Singh Saini
- Total no. of members: 14
- Member parties: 2: BJP; Independent
- Status in legislature: Minority Government with Outside Support
- Opposition party: INC
- Opposition leader: Bhupinder Singh Hooda

History
- Outgoing election: 2019
- Predecessor: Second Khattar ministry
- Successor: Second Saini ministry

The First Saini ministry was the council of ministers in the Indian state of Haryana headed by Nayab Singh Saini. The ministry was formed on 12 March 2024 and Saini along with five others took oaths of office. The first cabinet expansion took place on 19 March 2024 where 8 MLA's took oath as ministers out which one cabinet and seven minister of state. The ministry was dissolved on 17 October 2024 following the result of the 2024 Haryana Legislative Assembly election.

Gohana was announced to be 23rd district of Haryana by Chief minister Nayab Singh Saini.

== History ==
The ministry was formed on 12 March 2024 when Manohar Lal Khattar resigned after ending the coalition of BJP-JJP alliance (2019 - 2024). Governor Bandaru Dattatreya administered the oath of office and secrecy to the new leader of the Haryana Legislative Assembly and Lok Sabha member from Kurukshetra, Nayab Singh of the BJP and 5 other legislators at Raj Bhavan, Chandigarh.

=== Government formation ===
Nayab Singh Saini formed the government with the support of six independent MLAs and one MLA from Haryana Lokhit Party.

== Cabinet Ministers ==
Portfolio	Minister	Took office	Left office	Party	Remarks
Chief Minister of Haryana: Home; Revenue and Disaster Management; Excise and Taxation; Youth Empowerment & Entrepreneurship; Information, Public Relations, Language and Culture; Foreign Cooperation; Administration of Justice; Mines & Geology; General Administration; Criminal Investigation (C.I.D); Personnel & Training; Raj Bhawan Affairs; Law and Legislative; Any department not allotted to any other Minister.	Nayab Singh Saini	12 March 2024	17 October 2024	BJP	
Agriculture and Farmer's Welfare; Animal Husbandry & Dairying; Fisheries; Parliamentary Affairs; Hospitality and Heritage & Tourism Department	Kanwar Pal	12 March 2024	17 October 2024	BJP	
Industries & Commerce; Labour; Food; Civil Supplies & Consumer Affairs; Elections	Mool Chand Sharma	12 March 2024	17 October 2024	BJP	
Finance, Institutional Finance and Credit Control; Planning; Town & Country Planning and Urban Estates; Archives	Jai Parkash Dalal	12 March 2024	17 October 2024	BJP	
Public Works Department; Public Health Engineering Department; Architecture	Banwari Lal	12 March 2024	17 October 2024	BJP	
Power; New and Renewable Energy; Jail	Ranjit Singh Chautala	12 March 2024	17 October 2024	Independent politician	
Health; Medical Education; Ayush; Civil Aviation	Kamal Gupta	19 March 2024	17 October 2024	BJP	

== Ministers of state ==
Portfolio	Minister	Took office	Left office	Party
	Seema Trikha	19 March 2024	17 October 2024	BJP
	Mahipal Dhanda	19 March 2024	17 October 2024	BJP
	Aseem Goel	19 March 2024	17 October 2024	BJP
	Abhe Singh Yadav	19 March 2024	17 October 2024	BJP
	Subhash Sudha	19 March 2024	17 October 2024	BJP
	Bishamber Singh	19 March 2024	17 October 2024	BJP
	Sanjay Singh	19 March 2024	17 October 2024	BJP

== See also ==
- Haryana Legislative Assembly
- 14th Haryana Assembly
