= Arti Singh Rao =

Indian politician

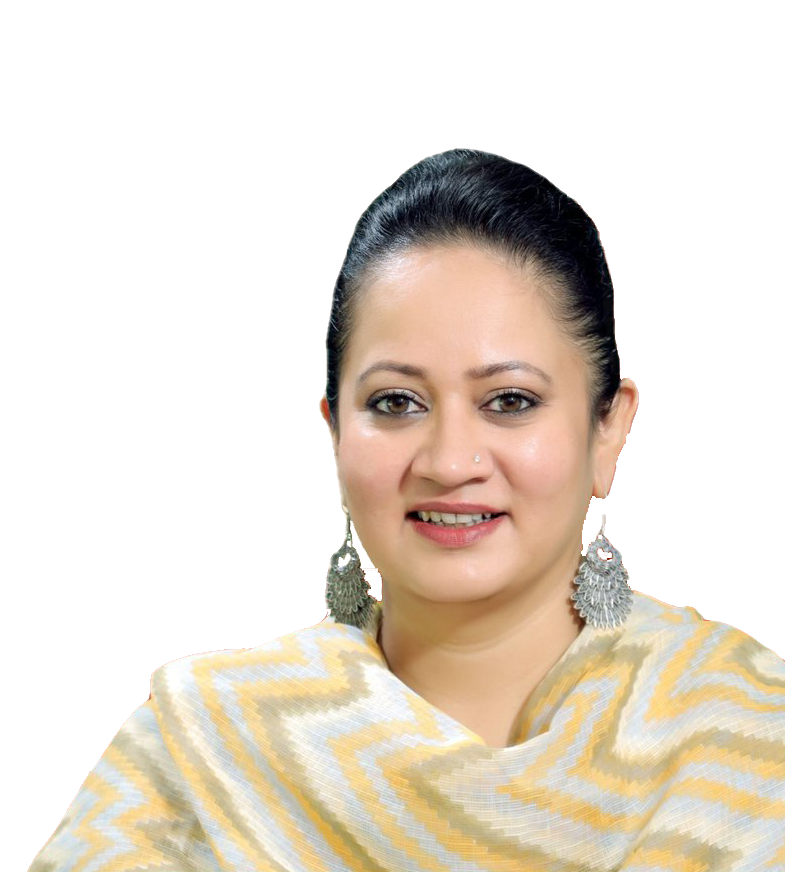

Minister of Health and Family Welfare, Government of Haryana
- Incumbent
- Assumed office 17 October 2024
- Governor: Bandaru Dattatreya
- Chief Minister: Nayab Singh Saini
- Additional Ministries and Departments: Medical Education & Research; Ayush

Member of Haryana Legislative Assembly
- Incumbent
- Assumed office 8 October 2024
- Preceded by: Sitaram Yadav
- Constituency: Ateli Assembly constituency

Personal details
- Born: 3 July 1979 (age 47) Near Bhagwat Bhakti Ashram, Rampura, Rewari, Haryana, India
- Party: Bharatiya Janata Party
- Relations: Rao Birender Singh (Grand-father)
- Parents: Rao Inderjit Singh (father); Manita Singh (mother)
- Education: Graduate
- Occupation: Politician & International Skeet Shooter

Arti Singh Rao is an Indian politician from the Bharatiya Janata Party, who is currently serving as the Minister of Health and Family Welfare of Haryana. She is a Member of the Haryana Legislative Assembly from the Ateli Assembly constituency since October 2024. She is the daughter of Rao Inderjit Singh, who is the current Minister of Culture of India.

== Early life ==
Arti Singh Rao was born in royal family of Rewari in 1979. She is a daughter of Indian politician & Union Minister Rao Inderjit Singh and Manita Singh. She was an International Skeet Shooter and has won multiple medals finishing best with a Gold Medal at the 2005 Asian Games. She started practicing shooting in 1998 and played her first international competition in 1999. She is the granddaughter of Rao Birender Singh, the former Chief Minister of Haryana. Her uncles, Rao Ajit Singh and Rao Yaduvendra Singh, are also politicians.

== Political career ==
Belonging to a well-established political family, her debut in politics was inevitable. Although she was active in the political sphere since the early 2010s, she was denied a ticket to Haryana Legislative Assembly seat earlier by BJP, but was offered one from Ateli constituency in 2024 Haryana Legislative Assembly election, a constituency in southern Haryana, where Rao Inderjit Singh has a very strong foothold. She defeated the BSP candidate Atar Lal and became the member of assembly for the first time. In the Second Saini ministry, she was sworn in as a cabinet minister and allotted Health ministry portfolio. She is also the Minister of Medical Education & Research and the Minister of Ayush.
