= Dharambir Singh Chaudhary =

Indian politician (born 1955)

Dharambir Singh

Member of Parliament, Lok Sabha
- Incumbent
- Assumed office 16 May 2014
- Preceded by: Shruti Choudhry
- Constituency: Bhiwani-Mahendragarh

Member of the Haryana Legislative Assembly
- In office 2009–2014
- Preceded by: Sukhbir Singh
- Succeeded by: Tejpal Tawar
- Constituency: Sohna
- In office 2005–2009
- Preceded by: Ranbir Singh
- Succeeded by: Raghbir Singh
- Constituency: Badhra
- In office 2000–2005
- Preceded by: Bansi Lal
- Succeeded by: Surender Singh
- Constituency: Tosham
- In office 1987–1991
- Preceded by: Bansi Lal
- Succeeded by: Bansi Lal
- Constituency: Tosham

Personal details
- Born: 5 March 1955 (age 71) Talu, Bhiwani, Haryana
- Party: Bharatiya Janata Party
- Other political affiliations: Indian National Congress (before 2014)
- Spouse: Manju Devi
- Children: 4
- Education: Kurukshetra University (B.A.)
- Occupation: Farmer

Chaudhary Dharambir Singh Panghal (born 1955) is an Indian politician and a member of Lok Sabha from Bhiwani-Mahendragarh (Lok Sabha constituency), Haryana. He won the 2014,2019 and 2024 Indian general elections, being a Bharatiya Janata Party member.

During his political career, he is famous for defeating the 3 generations of Bansi Lal family. He has also lost many elections against members of that family. He defeated Bansi Lal from Tosham (Vidhan Sabha constituency) as a Lok Dal candidate in 1987, then he defeated his son, Surender from Tosham in 2000 as a member of Congress, and later Bansi Lal's grand daughter (Surender's daughter) Shruti Choudhry from Bhiwani-Mahendragarh (Lok Sabha constituency) as a member of BJP in 2014 and 2019.

== Electoral performance ==
2005 Haryana Legislative Assembly election: Badhra
Party	Candidate	Votes	%	±%
INC	Dharambir	42,981	41.86	▲33.01
INLD	Ranbir Singh	25,745	25.07	▼4.47
Independent	Narpender Singh	25,288	24.63	New
Independent	Dalbir	4,070	3.96	New
BJP	Dharampal	2,180	2.12	New
Margin of victory		17,236	16.79	▲8.83
Turnout		1,02,681	76.39	▲3.18
Registered electors		1,34,422		▲15.35
INC gain from INLD		Swing	▲12.31	

2005 Haryana Legislative Assembly election: Badhra
Party	Candidate	Votes	%	±%
INC	Dharambir	42,981	41.86	▲33.01
INLD	Ranbir Singh	25,745	25.07	▼4.47
Independent	Narpender Singh	25,288	24.63	New
Independent	Dalbir	4,070	3.96	New
BJP	Dharampal	2,180	2.12	New
Margin of victory		17,236	16.79	▲8.83
Turnout		1,02,681	76.39	▲3.18
Registered electors		1,34,422		▲15.35
INC gain from INLD		Swing	▲12.31	

2000 Haryana Legislative Assembly election: Tosham
Party	Candidate	Votes	%	±%
INC	Dharambir	49,132	52.24%	▲13.15
HVP	Surender Singh	28,335	30.13%	▼23.48
INLD	Sunil Lamba	12,991	13.81%	New
BSP	Om Prakash	897	0.95%	New
Independent	Ram Sarup	672	0.71%	New
Independent	Ramehar	572	0.61%	New
Margin of victory		20,797	22.11%	▲7.60
Turnout		94,052	76.74%	▲4.30
Registered electors		1,22,641		▲0.67
INC gain from HVP		Swing	▼1.36	

1996 Haryana Legislative Assembly election: Tosham
Party	Candidate	Votes	%	±%
HVP	Bansi Lal	47,274	53.60%	▼1.49
INC	Dharambir	34,472	39.09%	▲2.37
SAP	Joginder	2,685	3.04%	New
JD	Ramesh	647	0.73%	New
Independent	Amar Chand	507	0.57%	New
Margin of victory		12,802	14.52%	▼3.86
Turnout		88,194	74.29%	▲8.98
Registered electors		1,21,829		▲11.21
HVP hold		Swing	▼1.49	

1991 Haryana Legislative Assembly election: Tosham
Party	Candidate	Votes	%	±%
HVP	Bansi Lal	38,272	55.10%	New
INC	Dharambir	25,507	36.72%	▼9.46
JP	Om Parkash S/O Nanu Ram	1,735	2.50%	New
BJP	Sukhpal Singh	1,513	2.18%	New
BSP	Dharam Pal	552	0.79%	New
Margin of victory		12,765	18.38%	▲15.05
Turnout		69,463	65.03%	▼2.40
Registered electors		1,09,549		▲9.66
HVP gain from LKD		Swing	▲5.59	

1987 Haryana Legislative Assembly election: Tosham
Party	Candidate	Votes	%	±%
LKD	Dharambir	32,547	49.51%	New
INC	Bansi Lal	30,361	46.18%	New
Independent	Dharam Pal	772	1.17%	New
Independent	Zile Singh	333	0.51%	New
Margin of victory		2,186	3.33%	
Turnout		65,743	69.71%	
Registered electors		99,898		
LKD gain from INC		Swing		
