= Tosham Assembly constituency =

Constituency of the Haryana legislative assembly in India

Coordinates: 28.87°N 75.91°E

Tosham
- Constituency No. 58 for the Haryana Legislative Assembly

Constituency details
- Country: India
- Region: North India
- State: Haryana
- District: Bhiwani
- Lok Sabha constituency: Bhiwani-Mahendragarh
- Established: 1967
- Total electors: 2,22,757
- Reservation: None

Member of Legislative Assembly
- 15th Haryana Legislative Assembly
- Incumbent Shruti Choudhry
- Party: Bharatiya Janata party
- Elected year: 2024

Tosham Assembly constituency is one of the 90 Vidhan Sabha (State Assembly) constituencies in Haryana state in northern India.

== Overview ==
Tosham (constituency number 58) is one of the 6 Assembly constituencies located in Bhiwani district. This constituency covers the entire Tosham tehsil and part of Bhiwani tehsil.

Tosham is part of Bhiwani-Mahendragarh Lok Sabha constituency along with eight other Assembly segments, namely, Loharu, Badhra, Dadri and Bhiwani in this district and Ateli, Mahendragarh, Narnaul and Nangal Chaudhry in Mahendragarh district.

== Members of the Legislative Assembly ==
Year	Member	Party
1962	Ch. Jagan Nath Badagar	Independent
1967	Chaudhary Bansi Lal	Indian National Congress
1972	Chaudhary Bansi Lal	Indian National Congress
1977	Surender Singh	Independent
1982	Surender Singh	Indian National Congress
1986^	Ch. Bansi Lal	Indian National Congress
1987	Election annulled	
1991	Ch. Bansi Lal	Haryana Vikas Party
1996	Ch. Bansi Lal	Haryana Vikas Party
2000	Dharambir Singh Chaudhary	Indian National Congress
2005	Surender Singh	Indian National Congress
2005^	Kiran Choudhry	Indian National Congress
2009	Kiran Choudhry	Indian National Congress
2014	Kiran Choudhry	Indian National Congress
2019	Kiran Choudhry	Indian National Congress
2024	Shruti Choudhry	Bharatiya Janata Party

^By election

== Election results ==
=== Assembly Election 2024 ===
2024 Haryana Legislative Assembly election: Tosham
Party	Candidate	Votes	%	±%
BJP	Shruti Choudhry	76,414	47.55%	▲10.18
INC	Anirudh Chaudhry	62,157	38.68%	▼11.04
Independent	Shashi Ranjan Parmar	15,859	9.87%	New
JJP	Rajesh Bhardwaj	2,175	1.35%	▼3.79
BSP	Om Singh	1,645	1.02%	▼2.06
NOTA	None of the Above	490	0.30%	New
Margin of victory		14,257	8.87%	▼3.48
Turnout		1,60,692	72.57%	▲2.63
Registered electors		2,22,757		▲5.92
BJP gain from INC		Swing	▼2.17	

=== Assembly Election 2019 ===
2019 Haryana Legislative Assembly election: Tosham
Party	Candidate	Votes	%	±%
INC	Kiran Choudhry	72,699	49.72	▲11.26
BJP	Shashi Ranjan Parmar	54,640	37.37	▲36.17
JJP	Sita Ram	7,522	5.14	New
BSP	Narender Lara	4,513	3.09	▲1.78
INLD	Kamla Rani	2,094	1.43	▼23.99
AAP	Pawan Hindustani	865	0.59	New
Margin of victory		18,059	12.35	▼0.69
Turnout		1,46,204	69.93	▼11.45
Registered electors		2,09,063		▲12.42
INC hold		Swing	▲11.26	

=== Assembly Election 2014 ===
2014 Haryana Legislative Assembly election: Tosham
Party	Candidate	Votes	%	±%
INC	Kiran Choudhry	58,218	38.46	▼19.16
INLD	Kamla Rani	38,477	25.42	▲10.45
Independent	Rajbir Singgh Lala	38,427	25.39	New
HJC(BL)	Ved Pal Tanwar	5,907	3.90	▼9.27
BSP	Jai Bhagwan	1,971	1.30	▼6.44
BJP	Gunpal	1,822	1.20	▼2.00
Margin of victory		19,741	13.04	▼29.61
Turnout		1,51,357	81.39	▲13.19
Registered electors		1,85,970		▲17.33
INC hold		Swing	▼19.16	

=== Assembly Election 2009 ===
2009 Haryana Legislative Assembly election: Tosham
Party	Candidate	Votes	%	±%
INC	Kiran Choudhry	62,290	57.63	▼41.73
INLD	Col. Gajraj Singh	16,183	14.97	New
HJC(BL)	Kamal Singh	14,233	13.17	New
BSP	Narender Lara	8,369	7.74	New
BJP	Meena Kumari	3,460	3.20	New
Margin of victory		46,107	42.66	▼56.43
Turnout		1,08,088	68.19	▼20.63
Registered electors		1,58,501		▲11.14
INC hold		Swing	▼41.73	

=== Assembly By-election 2005 ===
2005 Haryana Legislative Assembly by-election: Tosham
Party	Candidate	Votes	%	±%
INC	Kiran Choudhry	125,858	99.36	▲45.39
Independent	Mangal Singh Khreta	338	0.27	New
Independent	Jitendra	208	0.16	New
Margin of victory		1,25,520	99.09	▲77.86
Turnout		1,26,674	88.82	▲14.14
Registered electors		1,42,617		
INC hold		Swing		

=== Assembly Election 2005 ===
2005 Haryana Legislative Assembly election: Tosham
Party	Candidate	Votes	%	±%
INC	Surender Singh	57,480	53.97%	▲1.73
INLD	Sunil Kumar Lamba	34,868	32.74%	▲18.92
BJP	Col. Mangal Singh	4,985	4.68%	New
LJP	Ram Dayal	3,140	2.95%	New
BSP	Subhash Chand	2,254	2.12%	▲1.16
CPI	Ram Kumar	1,057	0.99%	New
LKD	Chander Bhan	645	0.61%	New
Margin of victory		22,612	21.23%	▼0.88
Turnout		1,06,509	74.68%	▼2.01
Registered electors		1,42,617		▲16.29
INC hold		Swing	▲1.73	

=== Assembly Election 2000 ===
2000 Haryana Legislative Assembly election: Tosham
Party	Candidate	Votes	%	±%
INC	Dharambir	49,132	52.24%	▲13.15
HVP	Surender Singh	28,335	30.13%	▼23.48
INLD	Sunil Lamba	12,991	13.81%	New
BSP	Om Prakash	897	0.95%	New
Independent	Ram Sarup	672	0.71%	New
Independent	Ramehar	572	0.61%	New
Margin of victory		20,797	22.11%	▲7.60
Turnout		94,052	76.74%	▲4.30
Registered electors		1,22,641		▲0.67
INC gain from HVP		Swing	▼1.36	

=== Assembly Election 1996 ===
1996 Haryana Legislative Assembly election: Tosham
Party	Candidate	Votes	%	±%
HVP	Bansi Lal	47,274	53.60%	▼1.49
INC	Dharambir	34,472	39.09%	▲2.37
SAP	Joginder	2,685	3.04%	New
JD	Ramesh	647	0.73%	New
Independent	Amar Chand	507	0.57%	New
Margin of victory		12,802	14.52%	▼3.86
Turnout		88,194	74.29%	▲8.98
Registered electors		1,21,829		▲11.21
HVP hold		Swing	▼1.49	

=== Assembly Election 1991 ===
1991 Haryana Legislative Assembly election: Tosham
Party	Candidate	Votes	%	±%
HVP	Bansi Lal	38,272	55.10%	New
INC	Dharambir	25,507	36.72%	▼9.46
JP	Om Parkash S/O Nanu Ram	1,735	2.50%	New
BJP	Sukhpal Singh	1,513	2.18%	New
BSP	Dharam Pal	552	0.79%	New
Margin of victory		12,765	18.38%	▲15.05
Turnout		69,463	65.03%	▼2.40
Registered electors		1,09,549		▲9.66
HVP gain from LKD		Swing	▲5.59	

=== Assembly Election 1987 ===
1987 Haryana Legislative Assembly election: Tosham
Party	Candidate	Votes	%	±%
LKD	Dharambir	32,547	49.51%	New
INC	Bansi Lal	30,361	46.18%	New
Independent	Dharam Pal	772	1.17%	New
Independent	Zile Singh	333	0.51%	New
Margin of victory		2,186	3.33%	
Turnout		65,743	69.71%	
Registered electors		99,898		
LKD gain from INC		Swing		

=== Assembly By-election 1986 ===
1986 Haryana Legislative Assembly by-election: Tosham
Party	Candidate	Votes	%	±%
INC	Bansi Lal	81,298		
Independent	Ram Sarup	479		New
Independent	B. Ram	330		New
Independent	R. Singh	211		New
Margin of victory		80,819		
INC hold		Swing		

=== Assembly Election 1982 ===
1982 Haryana Legislative Assembly election: Tosham
Party	Candidate	Votes	%	±%
INC	Surender Singh	33,283	60.83%	New
LKD	Om Parkash	7,655	13.99%	New
Independent	Ram Sarup	7,145	13.06%	New
Independent	Ramesh Chand	2,750	5.03%	New
Independent	Jagbir	1,399	2.56%	New
JP	Bhanwar Singh	1,078	1.97%	▲1.03
Independent	Har Karan	557	1.02%	New
Margin of victory		25,628	46.84%	▲42.37
Turnout		54,711	66.63%	▼4.23
Registered electors		83,407		▲19.90
INC gain from Independent		Swing	▲11.81	

=== Assembly Election 1977 ===
1977 Haryana Legislative Assembly election: Tosham
Party	Candidate	Votes	%	±%
Independent	SUNDER SINGH	23,814	49.02%	New
Independent	Jangbir Singh	21,640	44.55%	New
Independent	Bhanwar Singh	1,073	2.21%	New
Independent	Prabhu Dayal	560	1.15%	New
JP	Balvir Singh	458	0.94%	New
Independent	Sajjan Kumar	402	0.83%	New
SUCI(C)	Zile Singh	292	0.60%	New
Margin of victory		2,174	4.48%	▼42.68
Turnout		48,576	70.61%	▼3.09
Registered electors		69,564		▲16.72
Independent gain from INC		Swing	▼22.15	

=== Assembly Election 1972 ===
1972 Haryana Legislative Assembly election: Tosham
Party	Candidate	Votes	%	±%
INC	Bansi Lal	30,934	71.17%	▲41.23
Independent	Devi Lal	10,440	24.02%	New
Independent	Gigrai	1,391	3.20%	New
Independent	Rattan Singh	697	1.60%	New
Margin of victory		20,494	47.15%	▲43.05
Turnout		43,462	75.09%	▲16.51
Registered electors		59,599		▲10.51
INC hold		Swing	▲41.23	

=== Assembly Election 1968 ===
1968 Haryana Legislative Assembly election: Tosham
Party	Candidate	Votes	%	±%
INC	Bansi Lal	9,109	29.94%	▲29.6
SSP	Jangbir Singh	7,860	25.84%	▲25.65
SWA	Deva Singh	6,090	20.02%	New
Independent	Jagam Nath	4,326	14.22%	New
Independent	Banwari Singh	2,790	9.17%	New
Independent	Mehatab	144	0.47%	New
Independent	Mohinder Singh	104	0.34%	New
Margin of victory		1,249	4.11%	▼11.74
Turnout		30,423	58.01%	▼8.39
Registered electors		53,932		▲3.16
INC hold		Swing	▼4.04	

=== Assembly Election 1967 ===
1967 Haryana Legislative Assembly election: Tosham
Party	Candidate	Votes	%	±%
INC	Bansi Lal	11,511	33.98%	New
SSP	M. R. D. Ram	6,142	18.13%	New
Independent	J. Singh	5,758	17.00%	New
Independent	Sajjan Kumar	3,732	11.02%	New
Independent	Sultan	2,766	8.17%	New
Independent	S. Ram	1,743	5.15%	New
Independent	A. Ram	1,160	3.42%	New
Independent	H. Narain	402	1.19%	New
Independent	D. Dutt	210	0.62%	New
Independent	Parbhati	208	0.61%	New
Margin of victory		5,369	15.85%	
Turnout		33,875	68.72%	
Registered electors		52,278		
INC win (new seat)				

== See also ==
- Tosham
- Tosham rock inscription
