= Sohna Assembly constituency =

Legislative Assembly constituency in Haryana State, India

Coordinates: 28.25°N 77.07°E

Sohna
- Constituency No. 78 for the Haryana Legislative Assembly

Constituency details
- Country: India
- Region: North India
- State: Haryana
- District: Gurgaon, Nuh
- Lok Sabha constituency: Gurgaon
- Total electors: 2,84,731
- Reservation: None

Member of Legislative Assembly
- 15th Haryana Legislative Assembly
- Incumbent Tejpal Tawar
- Party: Bharatiya Janata Party
- Elected year: 2024

Sohna or Sohna-Taoru is one of the 90 Legislative Assembly constituencies of Haryana state in India. It is part of Gurgaon district and also contains the Taoru sub-division of the Nuh district, which previously had its own constituency.

== Members of the Legislative Assembly ==
Year	Member	Party
1967	Rao Mahabir Singh	Independent
1968	Kanhaya Lal	Indian National Congress
1972	Kanhaya Lal	Indian National Congress
1977	Vijay Pal Singh	Janata Party
1982	Rao Vijay Vir Singh	Independent
1987	Rao Dharampal	Independent
1991	Rao Dharampal	Indian National Congress
1996	Rao Narbir Singh	Haryana Vikas Party
2000	Rao Dharampal	Indian National Congress
2005	Sukhbir Singh	Independent
2009	Dharambir Singh Chaudhary	Indian National Congress
2014	Tejpal Tawar	Bharatiya Janata Party
2019	Sanjay Singh	Bharatiya Janata Party
2024	Tejpal Tawar	Bharatiya Janata Party

== Election results ==
=== Assembly Election 2024 ===
2024 Haryana Legislative Assembly election: Sohna
Party	Candidate	Votes	%	±%
BJP	Tejpal Tawar	61,243	30.09	▼6.07
INC	Rohtas Singh	49,366	24.25	▲17.69
Independent	Javed Ahmed	49,210	24.17	New
Independent	Kalyan Singh	21,754	10.69	New
BSP	Sunder Bhadana	15,476	7.60	▼16.78
AAP	Dharmendra Khatana	2,857	1.40	New
ASP(KR)	Vinesh Gujjar Ghata	2,040	1.00	New
NOTA	None of the Above	600	0.29	New
Margin of victory		11,877	5.83	▼1.78
Turnout		2,03,562	71.15	▲0.08
Registered electors		2,84,731		▲24.36
BJP hold		Swing	▼6.07	

=== Assembly Election 2019 ===
2019 Haryana Legislative Assembly election: Sohna
Party	Candidate	Votes	%	±%
BJP	Sanjay Singh	59,117	36.16	▼0.04
JJP	Rohtash Singh Khatana	46,664	28.54	New
BSP	Javed Ahmad	39,868	24.38	▲9.72
INC	Shamsuddin	10,735	6.57	▲3.90
Independent	Dharam Pal	1,978	1.21	New
INLD	Rohtash	1,338	0.82	▼18.87
Margin of victory		12,453	7.62	▼8.90
Turnout		1,63,499	71.06	▼5.89
Registered electors		2,30,071		▲19.15
BJP hold		Swing	▼0.04	

=== Assembly Election 2014 ===
2014 Haryana Legislative Assembly election: Sohna
Party	Candidate	Votes	%	±%
BJP	Tejpal Tawar	53,797	36.20	▲31.18
INLD	Kishore Yadav	29,250	19.68	▲11.50
BSP	Javed Ahmad	21,791	14.66	▼2.82
Independent	Rohtash Singh Khatana	19,983	13.45	New
Independent	Sanjay Raghav	4,157	2.80	New
INC	Rohtash Bedi	3,958	2.66	▼15.27
Independent	Ramjan Chaudhary	3,661	2.46	New
HJC(BL)	Palak Verma	2,163	1.46	▼10.45
HLP	Sahida Khan	1,965	1.32	New
Independent	Afseel	1,914	1.29	New
Independent	Tilak Raj Singh	1,702	1.15	New
Margin of victory		24,547	16.52	▲16.08
Turnout		1,48,601	76.96	▲2.50
Registered electors		1,93,099		▲26.10
BJP gain from INC		Swing	▲18.27	

=== Assembly Election 2009 ===
2009 Haryana Legislative Assembly election: Sohna
Party	Candidate	Votes	%	±%
INC	Dharamveer Singh Talu	20,443	17.93	▼15.46
BSP	Zakir Hussain	19,938	17.49	▲15.63
Independent	Sukhbir Singh	18,301	16.05	New
HJC(BL)	Rohtash Khatana	13,573	11.90	New
Independent	Javed Hussain	10,785	9.46	New
INLD	Saheeda	9,329	8.18	▼0.05
Independent	Nihal Singh	7,351	6.45	New
BJP	Tej Pal	5,722	5.02	▼0.79
Independent	Mahesh Dayma	5,026	4.41	New
Independent	Ramesh Chand	1,121	0.98	New
Independent	Bhoop Singh Raghav	835	0.73	New
Margin of victory		505	0.44	▼10.11
Turnout		1,14,015	74.46	▲0.80
Registered electors		1,53,130		▼2.76
INC gain from Independent		Swing	▼26.01	

=== Assembly Election 2005 ===
2005 Haryana Legislative Assembly election: Sohna
Party	Candidate	Votes	%	±%
Independent	Sukhbir Singh	50,967	43.94	New
INC	Dharam Pal	38,732	33.39	▼3.84
INLD	Ant Ram	9,547	8.23	▼10.64
BJP	Kartar Singh Bhadana	6,733	5.80	New
Independent	Kamalbir	5,852	5.05	New
BSP	Sahi Ram Tanwar	2,151	1.85	▼6.19
Independent	Parma Nand	647	0.56	New
Margin of victory		12,235	10.55	▼2.65
Turnout		1,15,988	73.65	▲5.04
Registered electors		1,57,480		▲23.25
Independent gain from INC		Swing	▲6.71	

=== Assembly Election 2000 ===
2000 Haryana Legislative Assembly election: Sohna
Party	Candidate	Votes	%	±%
INC	Dharam Pal	32,645	37.23	▲13.49
Independent	Sukhbir Singh	21,071	24.03	New
INLD	Madan Lal	16,541	18.87	New
Independent	Shri Krishan	8,239	9.40	New
BSP	Ram Chander	7,050	8.04	▼2.08
Independent	Yudhveer Singh	1,540	1.76	New
Margin of victory		11,574	13.20	▲1.90
Turnout		87,673	69.76	▲0.83
Registered electors		1,27,778		▼0.21
INC gain from HVP		Swing	▲2.20	

=== Assembly Election 1996 ===
1996 Haryana Legislative Assembly election: Sohna
Party	Candidate	Votes	%	±%
HVP	Narbir Singh	30,411	35.04	New
INC	Dharam Pal	20,606	23.74	▼22.92
SAP	Aridaman Singh	19,227	22.15	New
BSP	Rajender Kumar	8,781	10.12	New
AIIC(T)	Suraj Mal	3,696	4.26	New
Independent	Ram Avtar	1,151	1.33	New
Independent	Daulat Singh	586	0.68	New
Margin of victory		9,805	11.30	▼12.47
Turnout		86,798	70.73	▲2.52
Registered electors		1,28,046		▲14.52
HVP gain from INC		Swing	▼11.62	

=== Assembly Election 1991 ===
1991 Haryana Legislative Assembly election: Sohna
Party	Candidate	Votes	%	±%
INC	Dharam Pal	34,047	46.66	▲15.58
JP	Aridaman Singh	16,703	22.89	New
BJP	Tej Pal	14,084	19.30	New
JD	Balbir Singh	4,763	6.53	New
Sarvajati Janta Panchayat	Chuni Lal	898	1.23	New
Independent	Bhop Singh	736	1.01	New
Independent	Rattan Singh	665	0.91	New
Independent	Raghubir	431	0.59	New
Margin of victory		17,344	23.77	▲11.40
Turnout		72,974	67.10	▼7.11
Registered electors		1,11,813		▲10.89
INC gain from Independent		Swing	▲3.21	

=== Assembly Election 1987 ===
1987 Haryana Legislative Assembly election: Sohna
Party	Candidate	Votes	%	±%
Independent	Dharam Pal	31,703	43.44	New
INC	Kanhaya Lal	22,675	31.07	▲6.10
LKD	Prabhu Dayal	9,152	12.54	▼5.18
VHP	Balbir Singh	4,285	5.87	New
Independent	Ramavtar Yadav	2,351	3.22	New
Independent	Mahinder	1,152	1.58	New
Independent	Satbeer	764	1.05	New
Margin of victory		9,028	12.37	▲4.24
Turnout		72,977	73.84	▲5.92
Registered electors		1,00,829		▲20.35
Independent hold		Swing	▲10.34	

=== Assembly Election 1982 ===
1982 Haryana Legislative Assembly election: Sohna
Party	Candidate	Votes	%	±%
Independent	Vijay Vir Singh	18,432	33.11	New
INC	Gyasi Ram	13,904	24.97	▼0.77
LKD	Balbir Singh Bokan	9,864	17.72	New
Independent	Ram Chander	6,252	11.23	New
JP	Satya Parkash	2,940	5.28	▼33.35
Independent	Jagdish Singh	1,457	2.62	New
Independent	Rohtas Singh	883	1.59	New
Independent	Hem Ram	601	1.08	New
Independent	Jai Parkash	472	0.85	New
Independent	Todar	403	0.72	New
Margin of victory		4,528	8.13	▼1.75
Turnout		55,677	67.97	▲2.92
Registered electors		83,778		▲17.40
Independent gain from JP		Swing	▼5.53	

=== Assembly Election 1977 ===
1977 Haryana Legislative Assembly election: Sohna
Party	Candidate	Votes	%	±%
JP	Vijay Pal Singh	17,516	38.63	New
Independent	Mahabir Singh	13,033	28.75	New
INC	Ram Chander	11,671	25.74	▼30.05
Independent	Inderjeet Singh	2,608	5.75	New
Independent	Sant Ram	512	1.13	New
Margin of victory		4,483	9.89	▼6.08
Turnout		45,340	64.37	▼5.35
Registered electors		71,359		▲0.96
JP gain from INC		Swing	▼17.16	

=== Assembly Election 1972 ===
1972 Haryana Legislative Assembly election: Sohna
Party	Candidate	Votes	%	±%
INC	Kanhaya Lal	27,162	55.79	▲3.25
VHP	Pratap Singh Thakran	19,386	39.82	▼1.96
Independent	Khiland Ram	989	2.03	New
Independent	Balbir Singh	343	0.70	New
Independent	Rajinder Singh	321	0.66	New
Independent	Ram Phal	277	0.57	New
Independent	Amar Singh	209	0.43	New
Margin of victory		7,776	15.97	▲5.21
Turnout		48,687	70.43	▲1.38
Registered electors		70,678		▲15.33
INC hold		Swing	▲3.25	

=== Assembly Election 1968 ===
1968 Haryana Legislative Assembly election: Sohna
Party	Candidate	Votes	%	±%
INC	Kanhaya Lal	21,733	52.54	▲10.45
VHP	Tayyab Hussain	17,283	41.78	New
RPI	Sopat Rai	1,167	2.82	▲0.28
ABJS	Ram Pershad	669	1.62	▼51.21
Independent	Roop Chand	516	1.25	New
Margin of victory		4,450	10.76	▲0.02
Turnout		41,368	69.50	▼2.08
Registered electors		61,283		▲8.33
INC gain from ABJS		Swing	▼0.29	

=== Assembly Election 1967 ===
1967 Haryana Legislative Assembly election: Sohna
Party	Candidate	Votes	%	±%
ABJS	Pratap Singh Thakran	20,792	52.82	New
INC	Kanhaya Lal	16,567	42.09	New
Independent	M. Singh	15,733	39.97	New
INC	B. Dayal	13,051	33.16	New
Independent	R. Lall	5,559	14.12	New
ABJS	B. D. Hans	2,683	6.82	New
Independent	R. Chand	1,752	4.45	New
RPI	R. Sarup	1,001	2.54	New
Independent	S. Ram	548	1.39	New
Independent	B. Aggarwal	454	1.15	New
Independent	A. Singh	277	0.70	New
Margin of victory		4,225	10.73	
Turnout		39,362	73.20	
Registered electors		56,569		
ABJS win (new seat)				

== See also ==
- List of constituencies of the Haryana Legislative Assembly
- Gurgaon district
