= Bansi Lal =

3rd Chief Minister of Haryana

Bansi Lal Legha
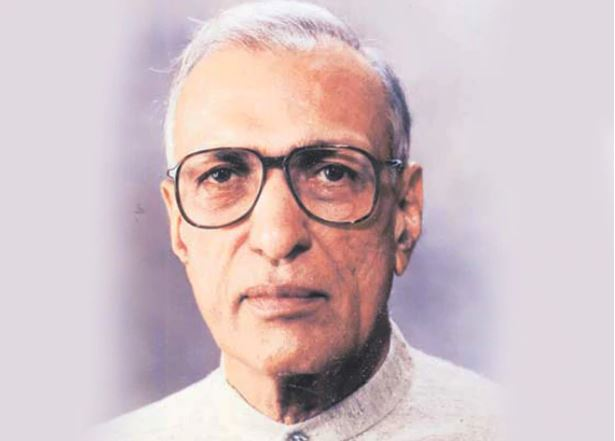

Minister of Defence of India
- In office 21 December 1975 – 24 March 1977
- Prime Minister: Indira Gandhi
- Preceded by: Indira Gandhi
- Succeeded by: Jagjivan Ram

Minister of Railways of India
- In office 31 December 1984 – 4 June 1986
- Prime Minister: Rajiv Gandhi
- Preceded by: A. B. A. Ghani Khan Choudhury
- Succeeded by: Mohsina Kidwai

3rd Chief Minister of Haryana
- In office 22 May 1968 – 30 November 1975
- Preceded by: President's rule
- Succeeded by: Banarsi Das Gupta
- In office 5 June 1986 – 19 June 1987
- Preceded by: Bhajan Lal
- Succeeded by: Chaudhary Devi Lal
- In office 11 May 1996 – 23 July 1999
- Preceded by: Bhajan Lal
- Succeeded by: Om Prakash Chautala

Member of Parliament, Lok Sabha
- In office 1980–1987
- Preceded by: Chandrawati
- Succeeded by: Chaudhary Ram Narain Singh
- Constituency: Bhiwani
- In office 1989–1991
- Preceded by: Chaudhary Ram Narain Singh
- Succeeded by: Jangbir Singh
- Constituency: Bhiwani

Personal details
- Born: 26 August 1927 Golagarh, Punjab, British India
- Died: 28 March 2006 (aged 78) New Delhi, India

Bansi Lal Legha (26 August 1927 – 28 March 2006), also known as Chaudhary Bansi Lal, was an Indian politician, who served as the Minister of Defence of India and three-time Chief Minister of Haryana. He is also known as the 'architect of modern Haryana'.

Lal was part of the famous Lal trio of Haryana, which also included Devi Lal and Bhajan Lal, that form the major political families of Haryana. Lal was elected as a Member of the Haryana Legislative Assembly seven times, the first time in 1967 from Tosham. He was considered a close confidant of the former Prime Minister of India, Indira Gandhi, and her son, Sanjay Gandhi, during the Emergency era of 1975-1977.

He set up Haryana Vikas Party after parting ways with the Indian National Congress in 1996. He returned to the Congress in 2004, and helped the Congress win the 2005 Assembly elections.

== Early life ==
He was born on 26 August 1927 to Choudhary Mohar Singh and Shrimati Vidya Devi belonging to Hindu Jat community in the village of Golagarh in Bhiwani district, British Punjab (now Haryana). Following his marriage, Lal had two sons, Surender Singh, and Ranbir Singh Mahendra.

The mother of Bansi Lal belongs to the Dhani Khubiram near Rudrol village of Charkhi Dadri district of Haryana, India.

== Education ==
Bansi Lal did his BA in arts, followed by LLB (law degree), for which he studied at the Punjab University Law College, Jalandhar.

== Political career ==
Lal was elected to the Haryana State Assembly seven times, the first time in 1967 from Tosham. He served three separate terms as Chief Minister of Haryana: 1968–75, 1986–87, and 1996–99. He served as the defence minister of India from December 1975 to March 1977, and had a brief stint as a minister without portfolio in the Union government in 1975. He also held the Railways and Transport portfolios.

He set up Haryana Vikas Party after parting ways with the Indian National Congress in 1996. He returned to Congress in 2004, and helped the Congress to win the 2005 Assembly elections.

- Lal was secretary of Parja mandal in the Loharu State, from 1943 to 1944.
- Lal was president of the Bar Association, Bhiwani from 1957 to 1958. He was president of the District Congress Committee, Hisar, from 1959 to 1962 and later became a member of the Congress Working Committee and Congress Parliamentary Board.
- He was a member of the Punjab Pradesh Congress Committee between 1958 and 1962.
- He was Haryana's chief minister : from 1968 to 1975 (Congress), 1985 to 1987 (Congress), and 1996 to 1999 with Haryana Vikas Party.
- He was the defence minister of India from December 1975 to March 1977.
- He was also the chairman of the Committee of Parliament and Committee on Public Undertakings, 1980–82, and the Committee on Estimates, 1982–84.
- He became Railways minister of India on 31 December 1984 in Rajiv Gandhi's ministry and later minister for transport.
- He was elected to the Haryana State Assembly five times from Tosham (1967, 1972, 1986 bye-poll, 1991, 1996). He lost once from Tosham in 1987 Devi Lal wave, just a few months after winning the seat with more than 80,000 votes in 1986.
- He was a Rajya Sabha member from 1960 to 1966 and 1976 to 1980. He was a Lok Sabha member from Bhiwani three times : 1980 to 1984, 1985 to 1986, and 1989 to 1991. He lost from Bhiwani in 1977 due to the Janata wave.
- After he parted company with Congress in 1996, Bansi Lal set up the Haryana Vikas Party and his campaign against prohibition propelled him to power in the assembly polls the same year.
- Chronologically : Rajya Sabha MP (1960-1966), Haryana MLA (1967-1975), Rajya Sabha (1976-1980 but lost Bhiwani Lok Sabha election in 1977), Lok Sabha MP from 1980 to 1984, 1984–1986, Haryana MLA 1986–1987, lost assembly election in 1987, became Lok Sabha MP 1989–1991, Haryana MLA 1991-1996 and 1996 to 2000.

=== Electoral performance ===
2000 Haryana Legislative Assembly election: Bhiwani
Party	Candidate	Votes	%	±%
HVP	Bansi Lal	33,199	46.39	▼12.82
INC	Vasudev Sharma	25,130	35.11	▲8.94
BSP	Anil Kumar	4,844	6.77	New
BJP	Rishi Ram	4,335	6.06	New
CPI(M)	Kulbhushan Arya	788	1.10	New
Independent	Sajjan Khangwal	641	0.90	New
SP	Ramesh Chander	546	0.76	New
JD(U)	Suresh Kumar	373	0.52	New
Independent	Jai Kumar	369	0.52	New
Margin of victory		8,069	11.27	▼21.75
Turnout		71,572	61.94	▼1.97
Registered electors		1,15,785		▼1.94
HVP hold		Swing	▼12.82	

1996 Haryana Legislative Assembly election: Tosham
Party	Candidate	Votes	%	±%
HVP	Bansi Lal	47,274	53.60%	▼1.49
INC	Dharambir	34,472	39.09%	▲2.37
SAP	Joginder	2,685	3.04%	New
JD	Ramesh	647	0.73%	New
Independent	Amar Chand	507	0.57%	New
Margin of victory		12,802	14.52%	▼3.86
Turnout		88,194	74.29%	▲8.98
Registered electors		1,21,829		▲11.21
HVP hold		Swing	▼1.49	

1991 Haryana Legislative Assembly election: Tosham
Party	Candidate	Votes	%	±%
HVP	Bansi Lal	38,272	55.10%	New
INC	Dharambir	25,507	36.72%	▼9.46
JP	Om Parkash S/O Nanu Ram	1,735	2.50%	New
BJP	Sukhpal Singh	1,513	2.18%	New
BSP	Dharam Pal	552	0.79%	New
Margin of victory		12,765	18.38%	▲15.05
Turnout		69,463	65.03%	▼2.40
Registered electors		1,09,549		▲9.66
HVP gain from LKD		Swing	▲5.59	

1987 Haryana Legislative Assembly election: Tosham
Party	Candidate	Votes	%	±%
LKD	Dharambir	32,547	49.51%	New
INC	Bansi Lal	30,361	46.18%	New
Independent	Dharam Pal	772	1.17%	New
Independent	Zile Singh	333	0.51%	New
Margin of victory		2,186	3.33%	
Turnout		65,743	69.71%	
Registered electors		99,898		
LKD gain from INC		Swing		

1986 Haryana Legislative Assembly by-election: Tosham
Party	Candidate	Votes	%	±%
INC	Bansi Lal	81,298		
Independent	Ram Sarup	479		New
Independent	B. Ram	330		New
Independent	R. Singh	211		New
Margin of victory		80,819		
INC hold		Swing		

1972 Haryana Legislative Assembly election: Tosham
Party	Candidate	Votes	%	±%
INC	Bansi Lal	30,934	71.17%	▲41.23
Independent	Devi Lal	10,440	24.02%	New
Independent	Gigrai	1,391	3.20%	New
Independent	Rattan Singh	697	1.60%	New
Margin of victory		20,494	47.15%	▲43.05
Turnout		43,462	75.09%	▲16.51
Registered electors		59,599		▲10.51
INC hold		Swing	▲41.23	

1968 Haryana Legislative Assembly election: Tosham
Party	Candidate	Votes	%	±%
INC	Bansi Lal	9,109	29.94%	▲29.6
SSP	Jangbir Singh	7,860	25.84%	▲25.65
SWA	Deva Singh	6,090	20.02%	New
Independent	Jagam Nath	4,326	14.22%	New
Independent	Banwari Singh	2,790	9.17%	New
Independent	Mehatab	144	0.47%	New
Independent	Mohinder Singh	104	0.34%	New
Margin of victory		1,249	4.11%	▼11.74
Turnout		30,423	58.01%	▼8.39
Registered electors		53,932		▲3.16
INC hold		Swing	▼4.04	

1967 Haryana Legislative Assembly election: Tosham
Party	Candidate	Votes	%	±%
INC	Bansi Lal	11,511	33.98%	New
SSP	M. R. D. Ram	6,142	18.13%	New
Independent	J. Singh	5,758	17.00%	New
Independent	Sajjan Kumar	3,732	11.02%	New
Independent	Sultan	2,766	8.17%	New
Independent	S. Ram	1,743	5.15%	New
Independent	A. Ram	1,160	3.42%	New
Independent	H. Narain	402	1.19%	New
Independent	D. Dutt	210	0.62%	New
Independent	Parbhati	208	0.61%	New
Margin of victory		5,369	15.85%	
Turnout		33,875	68.72%	
Registered electors		52,278		
INC win (new seat)				

== Chief Minister of Haryana ==
Bansi Lal became the chief minister of Haryana four times in 1968, 1972, 1986 and 1996. He was the third chief minister of Haryana after Bhagwat Dayal Sharma and Rao Birender Singh. He became Haryana chief minister for the first time on 31 May 1968 at the age of 41, making him the youngest chief minister in the country at the time, and remained in office till 13 March 1972. On 14 March 1972, he occupied the top post in the state for the second time and was in office till 29 November 1975. The third and fourth times he was appointed chief minister was from 5 June 1986 to 19 June 1987 and 11 May 1996 to 23 July 1999.

Bansi Lal was elected to the state assembly seven times, the first time being in 1967. After Haryana was formed in 1966, much of the state's industrial and agricultural development, especially creation of infrastructure, took place due to Lal's initiatives. He was elected to the state assembly for seven times in 1967, 1968, 1972, 1986, 1991 and 2000.

He was responsible for electrifying all villages in Haryana during his tenure as chief minister in the late sixties and seventies. He was also the pioneer of highway tourism in the state – a model later adopted by a number of states. He is regarded by many as an "Iron man" who was always close to reality and took keen interest in the upliftment of the community. Lal became one of the first Chief Ministers to visit Israel, when he led a delegation of agriculturalists and sarpanches to the country in 1971.

Even before the emergency he ruled the state of Haryana in an authoritarian fashion, within the first six and a half years of his rule as chief minister, the Haryana police took into custody more than 143,000 people, including many of his political opponents. He was known to dislike journalists and press especially those critical of him. Two months before the emergency he sent his goons with a senior municipal officer to demolish the offices of Chetna, a Bhiwani-based newspaper which was critical of him, and one day after the Emergency was declared arrested its editor Devabrata Vasisht along with his father. In other instances he tamed press critical of him like the Tribune at Chandigarh, by denying it government advertisements and using the police to fine vehicles that carried the paper to Haryana.

In 1974, Bansi Lal's son, Surender Singh along with a police escort stormed into the house of Bhanwar Singh, a student union leader at Bhiwani college, in Rewasa. They dragged Bhanwar, his sister, and his grandmother, the two siblings were stripped naked and made to lie on the same cot, while Bhanwar's grandmother was kicked to death. The journalist Makhan Lal Kak who reported this story was locked up on the very first day of the emergency, while the deputy superintendent who took part in this was given a promotion.

Bansi Lal also brought the Maruti car project to Haryana, which was Sanjay Gandhi's pet project, he provided over 297.3 acres of land for Maruti factory in the district of Gurgaon, of which 157 acres belonged to the Ministry of Defense, and 140 acres were highly fertile and populated land that belonged to many farmers. He also provided Maruti a government loan to cover the costs of this purchase. To this end 15,000 farmers were evicted.

Bansi Lal did not contest the assembly elections in 2005 but his sons Surender Singh and Ranbir Singh Mahendra were elected to the state assembly. Surender Singh died in a helicopter crash near Saharanpur in Uttar Pradesh on 31 March 2005.

== Role during Emergency ==
Lal was in the limelight when Emergency was imposed by the then Prime Minister Indira Gandhi in 1975. He was a confidante of Indira Gandhi and her son Sanjay Gandhi during the controversial Emergency days in 1975. He was part of a cabal around Sanjay Gandhi, along with V C Shukla, Om Mehta, et al., which came to be known as 'the Emergency caucus'. This group, led by Sanjay Gandhi, was said to be responsible for various harsh steps during the Emergency.

He was the defence minister from 21 December 1975 to 24 March 1977 and a minister without portfolio in the Union government from 1 December 1975 to 20 December 1975. The Shah Commission of Inquiry which was formed at end of the Emergency noted that Lal often misused his official position for personal reasons.

== Death ==
Lal died in New Delhi on 28 March 2006 at the age of 78. He had been unwell for quite some time.

== Awards and honours ==
- In 1972, the Kurukshetra University and the Haryana Agricultural University awarded him honorary degrees of Doctor of Law and Doctor of Science respectively.

== Legacy ==
- In 2008, the Jui canal was named the Bansi Lal Canal in his memory.
- In 2014, Chaudhary Bansi Lal University was created in Bhiwani in his memory.

=== Prominent family members ===
- Lal's elder son, Ranbir Singh Mahendra served as President of Board for Control of Cricket in India (BCCI).
- Lal's younger son's wife, Mrs. Kiran Choudhry, is a Member of the Legislative Assembly (2005, 2009, 2014) from Tosham constituency. She was cabinet minister in Bhupinder Singh Hooda's government from 2009 to 2014.
- Lal's grand daughter, Mrs. Shruti Choudhry, was a Member of the Parliament (2009) from Bhiwani constituency. She lost the 2014 general elections from same constituency.

== See also ==
- Aaya Ram Gaya Ram
- Dynastic politics of Haryana
