= Shalley Chaudhary =

Indian politician (born 1981)

Member of the Haryana Legislative Assembly
- Incumbent
- Assumed office 2019
- Preceded by: Nayab Singh Saini
- Constituency: Naraingarh

Personal details
- Party: Indian National Congress

Shalley Chaudhary (born 1981) is an Indian politician from Haryana. She is a two term MLA from Naraingarh Assembly constituency in Ambala district. She won the 2019 and 2024 election representing the Indian National Congress.

== Early life and education ==
Chaudhary is from Naraingarh, Ambala district, Haryana. She married Ram Kishan, a former two time MLA from Naraingarh. She studied only till Class 8.

== Career ==
Chaudhary won from Naraingarh Assembly constituency representing the Indian National Congress in the 2019 Haryana Legislative Assembly election. She polled 53,470 votes and defeated her nearest rival, Surender Singh of the Bharatiya Janata Party, by a margin of 20,600 votes. She was re-elected in 2024 Haryana Legislative Assembly election, defeating her nearest rival Pawan Saini of the Bharatiya Janata Party by a margin of 15,094 votes.
