= Tejpal Tawar =

Indian politician

Tejpal Tanwar

Member of the Haryana Legislative Assembly
- Incumbent
- Assumed office 2024
- Preceded by: Sanjay Singh
- Constituency: Sohna
- In office 15 October 2014 – 26 October 2019
- Preceded by: Dharambir Singh Chaudhary
- Succeeded by: Sanjay Singh
- Constituency: Sohna

Personal details
- Born: 5 January 1951 (age 75) Ramgarh, Badshahpur, Gurgaon, Haryana
- Party: Bharatiya Janata Party
- Spouse: Imlawati
- Relations: 6
- Profession: Farmer & Politician

Tejpal Tawar (born 5 January 1951) is a three time MLA of the Haryana Legislative Assembly from the BJP representing the Sohna Vidhan sabha constituency in Haryana.Tejpal Tawar from the Sohna Vidhan sabha Constituency in Haryana.
