= Ladwa Assembly constituency =

Electoral constituency in Haryana, India

- Constituency No. 11 for the Haryana Legislative Assembly
- 29.5945°N 77.0224°E

Constituency details
- Country: India
- Region: North India
- State: Haryana
- District: Kurukshetra
- Lok Sabha constituency: Kurukshetra
- Established: 2009
- Total electors: 1,96,614
- Reservation: None

Member of Legislative Assembly
- 15th Haryana Legislative Assembly
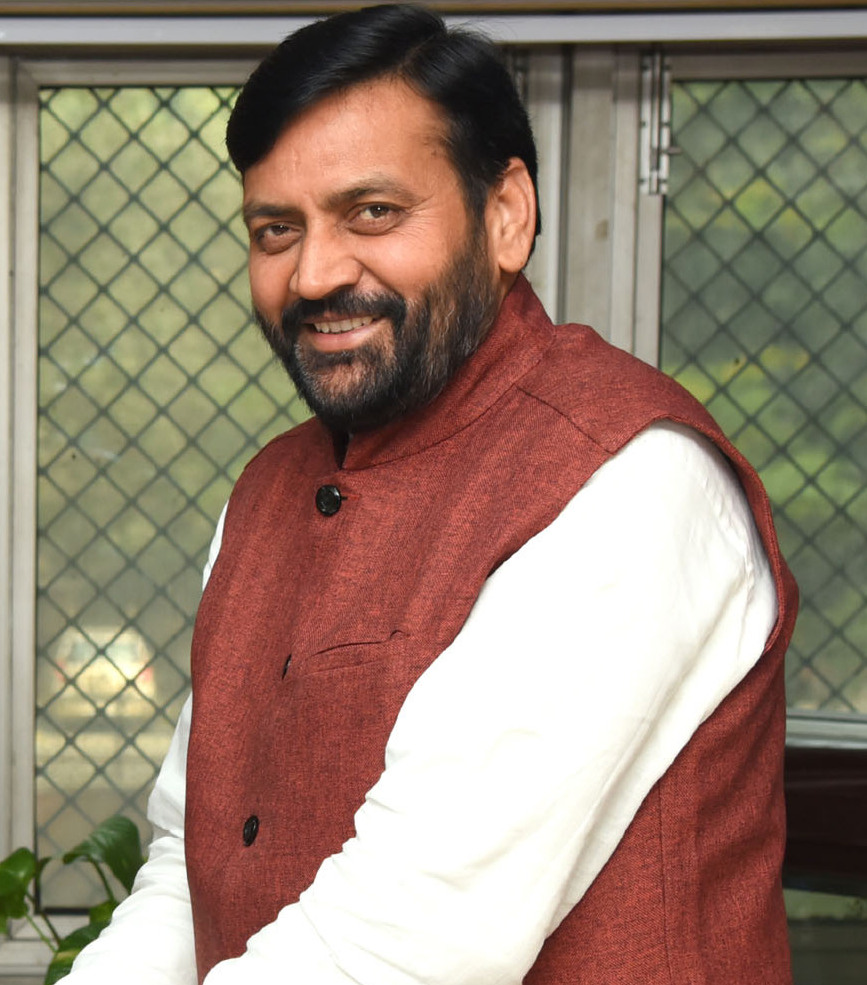
- Incumbent Nayab Singh Saini; Chief Minister of Haryana
- Party: BJP
- Elected year: 2024

Ladwa Assembly constituency in Kurukshetra district is one of the 90 Vidhan Sabha constituencies of Haryana state in northern India. Chief minister of state represents this constituency.

== Members of the Legislative Assembly ==
Vote share of Winning candidates
2024	47.40%
2019	41.86%
2014	30.89%
2009	28.92%

Year	Member	Party
Till 2009: Constituency did not exist
2009	Sher Singh Barshami	Indian National Lok Dal
2014	Pawan Saini	Bharatiya Janata Party
2019	Mewa Singh Singroha	Indian National Congress
2024	Nayab Singh Saini	Bharatiya Janata Party

== Election results ==
=== Assembly Election 2024 ===
2024 Haryana Legislative Assembly election: Ladwa
Party	Candidate	Votes	%	±%
BJP	Nayab Singh Saini	70,177	47.40	▲14.71
INC	Mewa Singh	54,123	36.55	▼5.31
Independent	Vikramjeet Singh Cheema	11,191	7.56	New
INLD	Sapna Barshami	7,439	5.02	▼6.24
Independent	Sandeep Garg Ladwa	2,262	1.53	New
NOTA	None of the Above	211	0.14	▼0.35
Margin of victory		16,054	10.84	▲1.67
Turnout		1,48,068	75.34	▲0.25
Registered electors		1,96,614		▲7.12
BJP gain from INC		Swing	▲5.54	

=== Assembly Election 2019 ===
2019 Haryana Legislative Assembly election: Ladwa
Party	Candidate	Votes	%	±%
INC	Mewa Singh	57,665	41.86	+17.81
BJP	Dr. Pawan Saini	45,028	32.69	+1.80
INLD	Sapna Barshami	15,513	11.26	−17.45
LSP	Naib Singh	9,099	6.60	New
JJP	Dr. Santosh Dahiya	2,918	2.12	New
BSP	Pal Singh	2,359	1.71	+0.56
AAP	Gurdev Singh Sura	1,481	1.08	New
Independent	Gurnam Singh	1,307	0.95	New
Margin of victory		12,637	9.17	+7.00
Turnout		1,37,763	75.09	−7.75
Registered electors		1,83,470		+10.60
INC gain from BJP		Swing	+10.97	

=== Assembly Election 2014 ===
2014 Haryana Legislative Assembly election: Ladwa
Party	Candidate	Votes	%	±%
BJP	Dr. Pawan Saini	42,445	30.89	+11.51
INLD	Bachan Kaur Barshami	39,453	28.71	−0.21
INC	Kailasho Saini	33,052	24.05	−2.64
Independent	Kaka Jatinder Singh	9,900	7.20	New
HJC(BL)	Deep Saini	7,512	5.47	+4.91
BSP	Ravinder Pal Singh	1,589	1.16	−7.40
Margin of victory		2,992	2.18	−0.05
Turnout		1,37,418	82.84	+1.50
Registered electors		1,65,885		+20.06
BJP gain from INLD		Swing	+1.97	

=== Assembly Election 2009 ===
2009 Haryana Legislative Assembly election: Ladwa
Party	Candidate	Votes	%	±%
INLD	Sher Singh Barshami	32,505	28.92	
INC	Kailasho Saini	30,000	26.69	
BJP	Mewa Singh	21,775	19.37	
Independent	Pawan Garg	15,081	13.42	
BSP	Shashi Saini	9,617	8.56	
Margin of victory		2,505	2.23	
Turnout		1,12,393	81.34	
Registered electors		1,38,172		
INLD win (new seat)				

== See also ==
- Haryana Legislative Assembly
- Elections in Haryana
- Elections in India
- Lok Sabha
- Rajya Sabha
- Election Commission of India
