= Bhiwani Lok Sabha constituency =

Former Lok Sabha constituency in Haryana

Coordinates: 28.8°N 76.1°E

Bhiwani
- Former Lok Sabha constituency

Constituency details
- Country: India
- Region: North India
- State: Haryana
- Established: 1973
- Abolished: 2008

Bhiwani was a Lok Sabha parliamentary constituency in Haryana until 2008. Later parts of it came under the newly devised Bhiwani–Mahendragarh Lok Sabha constituency.

== Members of Parliament ==
Year	Winner	Party
1977	Chandrawati Sheoran	Janata Party
1980	Bansi Lal	Indian National Congress
1984	Bansi Lal	Indian National Congress
1987^	Chaudhary Ram Narain Singh	Lok Dal
1989	Bansi Lal	Indian National Congress
1991	Jangbir Singh	Haryana Vikas Party
1996	Surender Singh	Haryana Vikas Party
1998	Surender Singh	Haryana Vikas Party
1999	Ajay Singh Chautala	Indian National Lok Dal
2004	Kuldeep Bishnoi	Indian National Congress
From 2009 onwards: See Bhiwani–Mahendragarh

== Detailed Results ==
Vote share of Winning candidates
2004	33.40%
1999	52.01%
1998	48.17%
1996	55.66%
1991	36.25%
1989	60.13%
1987 by-poll	52.76%
1984	66.00%
1980	41.81%
1977	67.62%

=== 2004 ===
2004 Indian general election: Bhiwani
Party	Candidate	Votes	%	±%
INC	Kuldeep Bishnoi	290,936	33.40	
HVP	Surender Singh	266,532	30.60	
INLD	Ajay Singh Chautala	241,958	27.77	
BJP	Ram Bilas	24,467	2.81	
BSP	Ramanand	17,216	1.98	
SP	Mahender Singh	2,977	0.34	
LJP	Kaptan	891	0.10	
IND	9 Independent Candidates	26,167	3.00	
Majority		24,404	2.80	
Turnout				
Swing to INC from INLD		Swing		

=== 1999 ===
1999 Indian general election: Bhiwani
Party	Candidate	Votes	%	±%
INLD	Ajay Singh Chautala	381,255	52.01	
INC	Dharambir	177,849	24.26	
HVP	Surender Singh	151,686	20.69	
CPI(M)	Comrade Parbhat Singh	10,511	1.43	
SP	Ramesh	3,171	0.43	
IND	24 Independent Candidates	8,570	1.17	
Majority		203,406	27.75	
Turnout		740,347	70.27	
Swing to INLD from HVP		Swing		

=== 1998 ===
1998 Indian general election: Bhiwani
Party	Candidate	Votes	%	±%
HVP	Surender Singh	361,257	48.17	
INLD	Ajay Singh	351,546	46.87	
INC	Ranbir Singh Mahender	27,789	3.71	
JD	Chhaju Ram	3,161	0.42	
IND	15 Independent Candidates	5,534	0.74	
OTH	2 Other Party Candidates	703	0.09	
Majority		9,711	1.30	
Turnout		759,887	72.21	
HVP hold		Swing		

=== 1996 ===
1996 Indian general election: Bhiwani
Party	Candidate	Votes	%	±%
HVP	Surender Singh	406,454	55.66	
INC	Jangbir Singh	181,271	24.82	
SAP	Gopi Ram Vashistha	73,654	10.09	
AIIC(T)	Bhola Ram	8,516	1.17	
JD	Ram Swaroop Verma	8,109	1.11	
IND	32 Independent Candidates	38,270	5.23	
OTH	6 Other Party Candidates	13,991	1.92	
Majority		225,183	30.84	
Turnout		749,299	70.65	
HVP hold		Swing		

=== 1991 ===
1991 Indian general election: Bhiwani
Party	Candidate	Votes	%	±%
HVP	Jangbir Singh	210,090	36.25	
INC	Jai Narain	179,525	30.98	
JP	Hukum Singh	100,288	17.31	
BJP	Ramesh Chander	48,570	8.38	
DDP	Budh Ram	4,305	0.74	
IND	35 Independent Candidates	36,739	6.34	
Majority		30,565	5.27	
Turnout		596,369	62.81	
Swing to HVP from INC		Swing		

=== 1989 ===
1989 Indian general election: Bhiwani
Party	Candidate	Votes	%	±%
INC	Bansi Lal	357,625	60.13	
JD	Dharambir	200,295	33.67	
BSP	Rajender	14,609	2.46	
IND	119 Independent Candidates	22,271	3.74	
Majority		157,330	26.46	
Turnout		604,350	63.98	
Swing to INC from LKD		Swing		

=== 1987 by-election ===
1987 Lok Sabha by-election: Bhiwani
Party	Candidate	Votes	%	±%
LKD	R. N. Singh	312,900	52.76	
INC	D. Nand	223,548	37.69	
LKD(A)	P. Singh	14,419	2.43	
IND	R. S. Kataria	11,380	1.92	
IND	K. J. Singh alias D. Pakar	7,394	1.25	
IND	N. R. Kishan	6,786	1.14	
IND	R. Dass	3,058	0.52	
IND	R. A. Singh	2,154	0.36	
IND	P. Lal	1,953	0.33	
IND	P. M. Sharma	1,719	0.29	
IND	D. P. M. Lal Aggarwal	1,423	0.24	
IND	H. Raj	1,392	0.23	
IND	G. Dass	1,233	0.21	
IND	B. Singh	1,046	0.18	
IND	S. S. S. Singh	906	0.15	
IND	S. Chhabari	901	0.15	
IND	O. P. Angiras	868	0.15	
Majority		89,352	15.07	
Turnout				
Swing to LKD from INC		Swing		

=== 1984 ===
1984 Indian general election: Bhiwani
Party	Candidate	Votes	%	±%
INC	Bansi Lal	347,226	66.00	
INC(J)	Jai Narain	160,149	30.44	
IND	15 Independent Candidates	18,688	3.55	
Majority		187,077	35.56	
Turnout		535,634	68.47	
Swing to INC from INC(I)		Swing		

=== 1980 ===
1980 Indian general election: Bhiwani
Party	Candidate	Votes	%	±%
INC(I)	Bansi Lal	194,437	41.81	
JP	Balwant Rai Tayal	144,366	31.05	
JP(S)	Chandrawati	99,578	21.41	
IND	Bhale Ram	9,544	2.05	
IND	13 Independent Candidates	12,751	2.73	
OTH	2 Other Party Candidates	4,344	0.93	
Majority		50,071	10.76	
Turnout		474,103	66.86	
Swing to INC(I) from JP		Swing		

=== 1977 ===
1977 Indian general election: Bhiwani
Party	Candidate	Votes	%	±%
JP	Chandrawati	289,135	67.62	
INC	Bansi Lal	127,893	29.91	
IND	Chhotu	10,556	2.47	
Majority		161,242	37.71	
Turnout		435,502	73.70	
JP win (new seat)				

== See also ==
- Bhiwani
- List of constituencies of the Lok Sabha
- Bhiwani–Mahendragarh Lok Sabha constituency
