= Panipat Rural Assembly constituency =

Constituency of the Haryana legislative assembly in India

Coordinates: 29.40°N 76.96°E

- Constituency No. 24 for the Haryana Legislative Assembly

Constituency details
- Country: India
- Region: North India
- State: Haryana
- District: Panipat district
- Total electors: 2,85,756
- Reservation: None

Member of Legislative Assembly
- 15th Haryana Legislative Assembly
- Incumbent Mahipal Dhanda (Bharatiya Janata Party, 26 October 2014 – )

Panipat Rural Assembly constituency is one of the 90 constituencies in the Haryana Legislative Assembly of Haryana a northern state of India. It is also part of Karnal (Lok Sabha constituency).

== Members of Legislative Assembly ==
Year	Member	Party
Till 2009: Constituency did not exist
2009	Om Prakash Jain	Independent politician
2014	Mahipal Dhanda	Bharatiya Janata Party
2019	Mahipal Dhanda	Bharatiya Janata Party
2024	Mahipal Dhanda	Bharatiya Janata Party

== Election results ==
=== Assembly Election 2024 ===
2024 Haryana Legislative Assembly election: Panipat Rural
Party	Candidate	Votes	%	±%
BJP	Mahipal Dhanda	101,079	50.25%	▲9.48
INC	Sachin Kundu	50,867	25.29%	▲18.80
Independent	Vijay Jain	43,323	21.54%	New
AAP	Sukhvir Malik	1,682	0.84%	New
BSP	Ranbir Singh	1,615	0.80%	▼6.26
NOTA	None of the Above	1,153	0.57%	▲0.03
Margin of victory		50,212	24.96%	▲11.62
Turnout		2,01,139	69.51%	▲1.63
Registered electors		2,85,756		▲19.37
BJP hold		Swing	▲9.48	

=== Assembly Election 2019 ===
2019 Haryana Legislative Assembly election: Panipat Rural
Party	Candidate	Votes	%	±%
BJP	Mahipal Dhanda	67,086	40.77	▲0.70
JJP	Devender Kadian	45,125	27.42	
Independent	Sandeep Bhardwaj	20,393	12.39	
BSP	Balkar Malik	11,619	7.06	▲4.45
INC	Om Parkash Jain	10,679	6.49	▼3.35
LSP	Lakhmi Chand	3,831	2.33	
INLD	Kuldeep Rathee	2,052	1.25	▼14.12
CPI	Jamshed Rana	1,287	0.78	
NOTA	None of the above	897	0.55	
Margin of victory		21,961	13.35	▼9.98
Turnout		1,64,545	67.88	▼8.19
Registered electors		2,42,423		▲19.03
BJP hold		Swing	▲0.70	

=== Assembly Election 2014 ===
2014 Haryana Legislative Assembly election: Panipat Rural
Party	Candidate	Votes	%	±%
BJP	Mahipal Dhanda	62,074	40.07	▲34.04
Independent	Dhara Singh	25,942	16.75	
INLD	Nishan Singh Malik	23,804	15.37	▼2.48
INC	Khushi Ram Jaglan	15,247	9.84	▼2.67
Independent	Ramphal Begampur	5,390	3.48	
Independent	Sanjay Kadyan	4,156	2.68	
BSP	Ram Niwas Sharma	4,043	2.61	▼5.69
Margin of victory		36,132	23.32	▲16.41
Turnout		1,54,915	76.07	▲0.06
Registered electors		2,03,657		▲61.19
BJP gain from Independent		Swing	▲15.32	

=== Assembly Election 2009 ===
2009 Haryana Legislative Assembly election: Panipat Rural
Party	Candidate	Votes	%	±%
Independent	Om Prakash Jain	23,770	24.75	
INLD	Bimla Kadian	17,134	17.84	
Independent	Dhara Singh	12,221	12.73	
INC	Parsani Devi	12,017	12.51	
HJC(BL)	Bijender Singh Kadyan	9,830	10.24	
BSP	Satvinder	7,969	8.30	
BJP	Surender	5,791	6.03	
Independent	Tilak Raj	3,869	4.03	
Independent	Pawan Kumar	1,185	1.23	
Independent	Mukesh Balmiki	566	0.59	
Margin of victory		6,636	6.91	
Turnout		96,031	76.01	
Registered electors		1,26,347		
Independent win (new seat)				
