= Mahipal Dhanda =

Education Minister of Haryana(2025)

Cabinet Minister, Government of Haryana
- Incumbent
- Assumed office 17 October 2024
- Governor: Bandaru Dattatreya
- Chief Minister: Nayab Singh Saini
- Ministry and Departments: Higher Education Archives; Parliamentary Affairs; School Education

Member of Haryana Legislative Assembly
- Incumbent
- Assumed office 26 October 2014
- Preceded by: Om Prakash Jain
- Constituency: Panipat Rural (Vidhan Sabha constituency)

Personal details
- Born: 16 September 1974 (age 51) Kawi, Panipat, Haryana, India
- Party: Bharatiya Janata Party
- Spouse: Neelam Dhanda
- Profession: Politician

Mahipal Dhanda is an Indian politician. He was elected to the Haryana Legislative Assembly from Panipat Rural (Vidhan Sabha constituency) in the 2014 and 2019 Haryana Legislative Assembly election as a member of the Bharatiya Janata Party.

Personal Background

He was born on 16 September 1974 in Kawi, Panipat district, Haryana. He comes from a farming family. He's married to Neelam Dhanda.

Political Career

He joined the RSS (Rashtriya Swayamsevak Sangh) in 1987. Later, he got involved in student politics via ABVP.

In BJP:

• Became district vice president in 2004. • District general secretary in 2006. • State president of BJP's youth wing (Bharatiya Janata Yuva Morcha) in 2009. • State president of BJP's Kisan (farmer) cell in 2012. • Elected to Haryana Legislative Assembly from Panipat Rural in 2014. • Re-elected in 2019. • As of October 2024, he serves in the Haryana state cabinet and holds various ministries, including Higher Education, Archives, Parliamentary Affairs, and School Education.

Key Achievements / Recent Actions

• After becoming an education minister, one of his priorities has been improving government schools. • Under him, 844 teachers were promoted in Haryana, including principals. • Efforts were made to revise state syllabi in line with the National Education Policy. • He has a strong voter base and recently won by large margins, making him a prominent Jat leader in the Panipat area.
