= Mewa Singh (politician) =

Indian politician

Mewa Singh Singroha is a politician belonging to the Indian National Congress. He served as a Member of Legislative Assembly in the Ladwa Assembly constituency from 2019 to 2024. He lost re-election to Nayab Saini of the Bharatiya Janata Party in 2024.
