= Sanjay Singh (Haryana politician) =

Indian politician from Haryana

Member of the Haryana Legislative Assembly
- In office 2019–2024
- Preceded by: Tejpal Tawar
- Succeeded by: Tejpal Tawar
- Constituency: Sohna

Personal details
- Born: 1974 or 1975 (age 50–51) Gurgaon, Haryana, India
- Education: Maharshi Dayanand University, Rohtak (BA, 1997)
- Profession: Politician, farmer

Sanjay Singh is an Indian politician and former Member of the Haryana Legislative Assembly from the Sohna-Taoru constituency in the Gurgaon and Nuh district of Haryana. He is a member of the Bharatiya Janata Party. He was an Environment, Forests, Wildlife and Sports minister in the Nayab Singh Saini government.

== Personal life ==
Singh is son of former minister Surajpal Singh and an agriculturist by profession. He graduated from Maharshi Dayanand University, Rohtak, in Bachelor of Arts in 1997.

== Electoral performance ==
2019 Haryana Legislative Assembly election: Sohna
Party	Candidate	Votes	%	±%
BJP	Sanjay Singh	59,117	36.16	▼0.04
JJP	Rohtash Singh Khatana	46,664	28.54	New
BSP	Javed Ahmad	39,868	24.38	▲9.72
INC	Shamsuddin	10,735	6.57	▲3.90
Independent	Dharam Pal	1,978	1.21	New
INLD	Rohtash	1,338	0.82	▼18.87
Margin of victory		12,453	7.62	▼8.90
Turnout		1,63,499	71.06	▼5.89
Registered electors		2,30,071		▲19.15
BJP hold		Swing	▼0.04	
