= Second Saini ministry =

25th Ministry of Haryana (since October 2024)

- 25th Ministry of Haryana
- 2024 - present
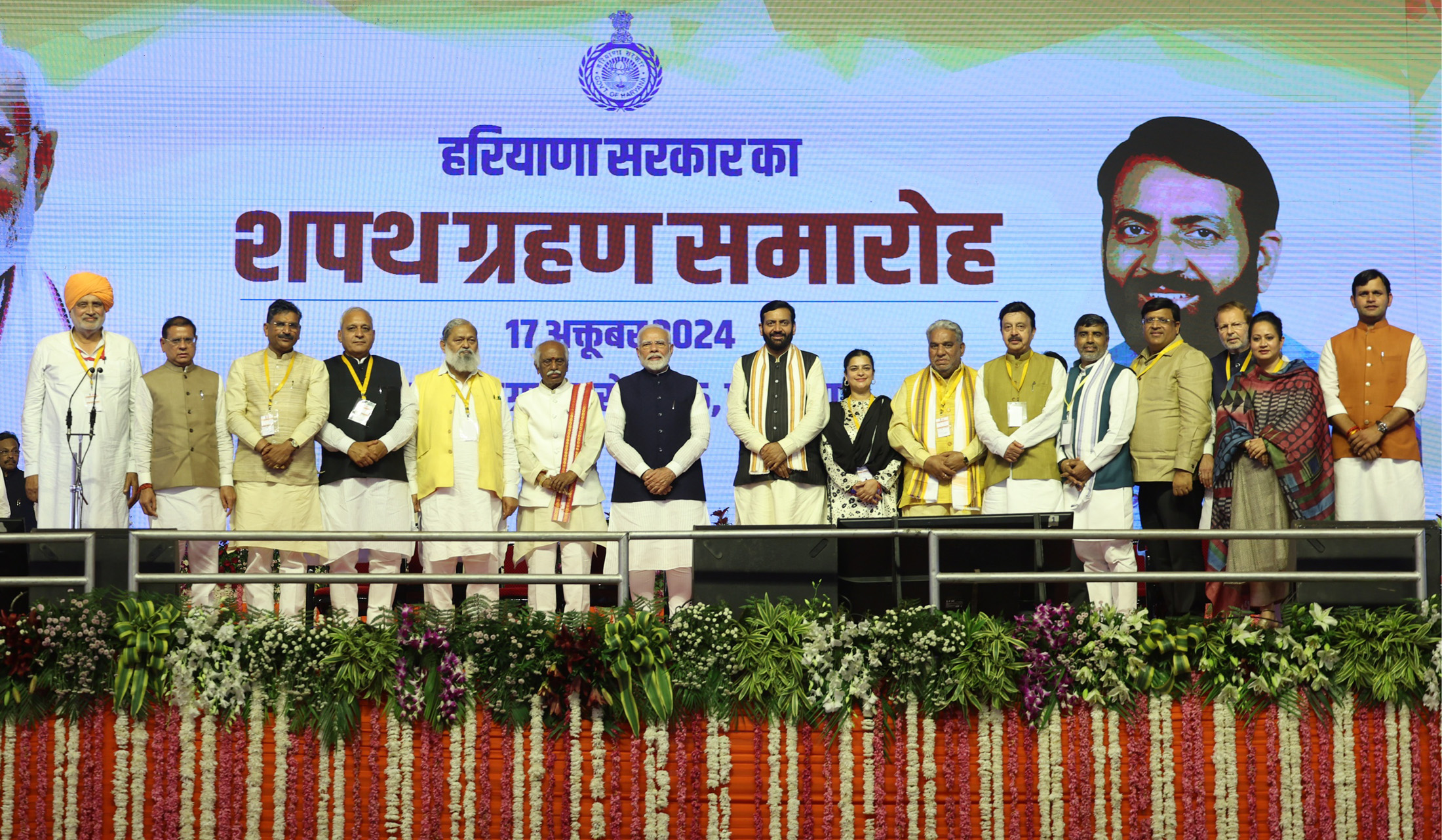
- Date formed: 17 October 2024

People and organisations
- Governor: Bandaru Dattatreya (17 October 2024 - 20 July 2025) Ashim Kumar Ghosh (21 July 2025 - Present)
- Chief Minister: Nayab Singh Saini
- Total no. of members: 14
- Member party: Bharatiya Janata Party
- Status in legislature: Majority government
- Opposition party: Indian National Congress

History
- Election: 2024 election
- Legislature term: 15th Assembly (since 2024)
- Predecessor: First Saini ministry

The Second Saini ministry was formed on 17 October 2024, with incumbent Nayab Singh Saini as Chief Minister of Haryana for the second time, following victory in the 2024 Haryana Assembly election.

== Council of Ministers ==
=== Ministers ===
Portfolio	Minister	Took office	Left office	Party
Chief Minister • Home • Finance • Law and Justice • Excise and Taxation • Town and Country planning • Information • Language and Culture • General Administration • Personal and Training • Any other department not allotted to any minister.	Nayab Singh Saini	17 October 2024	Incumbent	BJP
• Industries & Commerce • Environment • Forests and Wild Life • Foreign Cooperation • Sainik & Ardh Sainik Welfare	Rao Narbir Singh	17 October 2024	Incumbent	BJP
• Energy • Transport • Labour	Anil Vij	17 October 2024	Incumbent	BJP
• Development & Panchayat • Mines & Geology	Krishan Lal Panwar	17 October 2024	Incumbent	BJP
• School Education • Higher Education • Archives • Parliamentary Affairs	Mahipal Dhanda	17 October 2024	Incumbent	BJP
• Revenue & Disaster Management • Urban Local Bodies • Civil Aviation	Vipul Goel	17 October 2024	Incumbent	BJP
• Co-operation • Jails • Elections • Heritage & Tourism	Arvind Kumar Sharma	17 October 2024	Incumbent	BJP
• Agriculture & Farmers Welfare • Animal Husbandry & Dairying • Fisheries	Shyam Singh Rana	17 October 2024	Incumbent	BJP
• Public Health Engineering • Public Works (Building & Roads)	Ranbir Singh Gangwa	17 October 2024	Incumbent	BJP
• Social Justice, Empowerment • SCs & BCs Welfare and Antyodaya (SEWA) • Hospitality • Architecture	Krishan Kumar Bedi	17 October 2024	Incumbent	BJP
• Women & Child Development • Irrigation & Water Resources	Shruti Choudhry	17 October 2024	Incumbent	BJP
• Health • Medical Education & Research • Ayush	Arti Singh Rao	17 October 2024	Incumbent	BJP

=== Ministers of state ===
Portfolio	Minister	Took office	Left office	Party
Minister of State (I/C); Food; Civil Supplies & Consumer Affairs; Printing & Stationery; Youth Empowerment & Entrepreneurship	Rajesh Nagar	17 October 2024	Incumbent	BJP
Minister of State (I/C); Youth Empowerment & Entrepreneurship; Sports; Law & Legislative (Attached)	Gaurav Gautam	17 October 2024	Incumbent	BJP

== Demographics ==
Representation of ministers by district
1. Ambala (7.14%)
2. Yamunanagar (7.14%)
3. Kurukshetra (7.14%)
4. Panipat (14.3%)
5. Sonipat (7.14%)
6. Jind (7.14%)
7. Hisar (7.14%)
8. Bhiwani (7.14%)
9. Mahendragarh (7.14%)
10. Gurgaon (7.14%)
11. Palwal (7.14%)
12. Faridabad (14.3%)

District	Ministers	Name of ministers
Panchkula	0	
Ambala	1	Anil Vij
Yamunanagar	1	Shyam Singh Rana
Kurukshetra	1	Nayab Singh Saini
Kaithal	0	
Karnal	0	
Panipat	2	Mahipal Dhanda; Krishan Lal Panwar
Sonipat	1	Arvind Kumar Sharma
Jind	1	Krishan Kumar Bedi
Fatehabad	0	
Sirsa	0	
Hisar	1	Ranbir Singh Gangwa
Bhiwani	1	Shruti Choudhry
Charkhi Dadri	0	
Rohtak	0	
Jhajjar	0	
Mahendragarh	1	Arti Singh Rao
Rewari	0	
Gurgaon	1	Rao Narbir Singh
Nuh	0	
Palwal	1	Gaurav Gautam
Faridabad	2	Vipul Goel; Rajesh Nagar
