= Nindana =

Nindana is a village near Rohtak city in the Rohtak district of Haryana, India. It falls under the jurisdiction of Meham tehsil of Rohtak district.

== History ==
Nindana is historically recognized as a village of the Panwar (Parmar) Rajput community in the Rohtak district of Haryana, India. It forms part of a group of Panwar Rajput villages (khap) in the region, which are connected through shared lineage traditions and long-standing social ties.

The Panwar Rajputs of this region trace their ancestry to Rohtas Singh Panwar, who is associated with the early foundation of Rohtak. The historical name of the area has been linked to Rohtas (Rohtash), and the settlement has been referred to as Rohtasgarh in historical accounts. Over time, descendants of this lineage established multiple settlements across present-day Rohtak and adjoining districts.

Historically, the Panwar Rajputs in this region held significant landholdings and were prominent in agriculture. During the British colonial period, several members of the community served as Zaildar, reflecting their role in local administration and revenue systems.

Nindana was founded by Neem Singh Panwar, and the village derives its name from him. It developed within the established network of Panwar Rajput settlements in the region, maintaining strong kinship ties and shared customs.

== Pre-independence ==
Before the independence of India in 1947, the Rohtak region had a significant population of Muslim Rajputs, commonly known as Ranghar. The Ranghar community formed an integral part of the agrarian society of Haryana and adjoining areas.

Ranghar Rajputs were traditionally engaged in agriculture, and many also served in military units such as Skinner's Horse during the colonial period. The term Ranghar has historically been used to denote Rajputs of the region who followed Islam, while retaining clan identities such as Panwar, Chauhan, Bhatti, and Tanwar.

Following the Partition of India in 1947, many Muslim Rajput families migrated to Pakistan, resulting in significant demographic changes in the region.

== Communities ==
The Panwar (Parmar) Rajputs form the principal community in Nindana and have historically been associated with landownership and agriculture. They are part of a wider network of Panwar Rajput villages in the Rohtak region, linked through traditional khap structures.

At present, Hindu Panwar Rajputs constitute the majority population of the village, alongside some populations of Brahmins and other communities.

The Rohtak district has historically been characterized by an agrarian social structure in which communities such as Rajputs, Brahmins and others have contributed to the local economy and culture.

Nindana continues to reflect this agrarian background, with agriculture remaining the primary occupation, along with increasing participation in education, government services, and other professions.
