= Surender Singh =

Indian politician (1946–2005)

Member of Parliament, Lok Sabha
- In office 9 May 1996 – 6 October 1999
- Preceded by: Jangbir Singh
- Succeeded by: Ajay Singh Chautala
- Constituency: Bhiwani, Haryana

Member of Parliament, Rajya Sabha
- In office 2 August 1986 – 1 August 1992
- Constituency: Haryana

Personal details
- Born: 15 November 1946 Bhiwani, Punjab, British India
- Died: 31 March 2005 (aged 58) Saharanpur, Uttar Pradesh, India
- Party: Haryana Vikas Party
- Spouse: Kiran Choudhry (m. 1972)
- Children: Shruti Choudhry (daughter)
- Parent: Bansi Lal (father)
- Occupation: Lawyer; agriculturist; politician

Surender Singh (15 November 1946 – 31 March 2005) was an Indian politician from the Haryana Vikas Party and twice (1996, 1998) represented Bhiwani constituency in the Lok Sabha, was a Rajya Sabha member 1986–1992, and twice represented Tosham in Haryana Vidhan Sabha. His widow won the Tosham by-poll caused by his death.

== Education ==
He was educated at Panjab University, Chandigarh and completed his Master of Arts and Bachelor of Law.

== Profession ==
Advocate and agriculturist, he is the son of former Haryana Chief Minister Bansi Lal.

== Positions held ==
1971-73 General-Secretary, District Congress Committee (D.C.C.), Bhiwani

1973-77 Treasurer, Indian Youth Congress

1977-86 Member, Haryana Vidhan Sabha

1982-83 Cabinet Minister, Agriculture and Wildlife Preservation, Haryana

1986-92 Member, Rajya Sabha

Member, Committee on Petitions

Member, House Committee

Member, Consultative Committee, Ministry of Civil Aviation

Member, Consultative Committee, Ministry of Defence

1989-90 Member, Public Accounts Committee

1996 Elected to 11th Lok Sabha

1996-97 Member, Committee on Human Resource Development

Member, Railway Convention Committee

Member, Hindi Salahakar Samiti, Ministry of Environment and Forests

Member, Committee on Science and Technology, Environment and Forests

Member, Consultative Committee, Ministry of Defence

1998 Re-elected to 12th Lok Sabha (2nd term)

1998-99 Member, Committee on Subordinate Legislation

Member, Committee on Public Undertakings

Member, Committee on Communications its Sub Committee 'A' on Department of Telecom

Member, Consultative Committee, Ministry of Civil Aviation

== Special interests ==
Travelling, participation in the youth activities; including: sports, cultural activities and debates.

== Favourite pastimes and recreation ==
Reading and sports

== Sports and clubs ==
Outstanding sportsman during college days, keen interest in cricket

== Countries visited ==
Canada, Finland, France, Switzerland, US and the former USSR; Member, Indian Parliamentary Delegation to UK, 1998

== Other information ==
He also held positions including President, Bar Association, Bhiwani, 1970–71, chairman, (i) Bar Council of Punjab and Haryana; (ii) Bar Council of Punjab and Haryana High Court, Chandigarh, 1978 and 1980–82; Member (i) Executive Council, Kurukshetra University; (ii) Executive Committee, C.R. Jat College, Hissar; (iii) Executive Committee, Indian Olympic Association; (iv) All India Congress Committee (Indira); and (v)Pradesh Congress Committee (Indira), Haryana.

== Death ==
On 31 March 2005 Singh aged 59, died along with noted industrialist and Power Minister Om Prakash Jindal, in a chopper crash during an emergency landing in Saharanpur district of Uttar Pradesh. He was survived by his wife Kiran Choudhry and daughter Shruti Choudhry.
