= Rudrol =

Village in Haryana, India

Coordinates: 28°28′23″N 76°05′44″E

- Interactive map of Rudrol
- Country: India
- State: Haryana
- District: Charkhi Dadri district

Government
  - Sarpanch: Babita Jangra

Area
  - Total: 933 ha (2,310 acres)

Population (2011)
  - Total: 1,992
- Time zone: UTC+5:30 (Indian Standard Time)
- Postal Index Number: 127308

Rudrol is a village in the Charkhi Dadri district of the Indian state of Haryana. Before 2016, it was part of Bhiwani district until the creation of Charkhi Dadri. It is situated 24.9 km away from district headquarter Charkhi Dadri, and 53.3 km. away from Bhiwani. As of 2009, Rudrol is also a gram panchayat.
