= Manohar Lal Khattar =

Indian politician (born 1954)

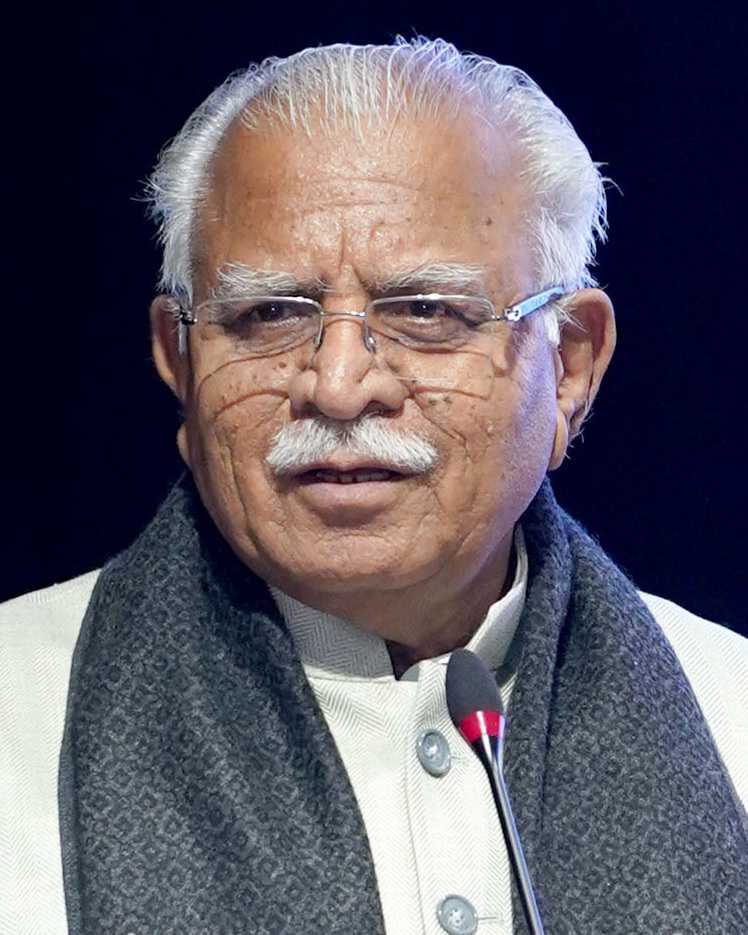
- Khattar in 2026

Union Minister of Power
- Incumbent
- Assumed office 10 June 2024
- President: Droupadi Murmu
- Prime Minister: Narendra Modi
- Preceded by: R. K. Singh

Union Minister of Housing and Urban Affairs
- Incumbent
- Assumed office 10 June 2024
- President: Droupadi Murmu
- Prime Minister: Narendra Modi
- Preceded by: Hardeep Singh Puri

Member of Parliament, Lok Sabha
- Incumbent
- Assumed office 4 June 2024
- Preceded by: Sanjay Bhatia
- Constituency: Karnal, Haryana

10th Chief Minister of Haryana
- In office 26 October 2014 – 12 March 2024
- Preceded by: Bhupinder Singh Hooda
- Succeeded by: Nayab Singh Saini

Member of Haryana Legislative Assembly
- In office 26 October 2014 – 13 March 2024
- Preceded by: Sumita Singh
- Succeeded by: Nayab Singh Saini
- Constituency: Karnal

Personal details
- Born: 5 May 1954 (age 72) Nindana, East Punjab, India
- Party: Bharatiya Janata Party
- Education: University of Delhi
- Occupation: Politician
- Website: manoharlalkhattar.in

Manohar Lal Khattar (born 5 May 1954) is an Indian politician who is serving as the 19th Minister of Power and 4th Minister of Housing and Urban Affairs since 2024. A prominent leader of the Bharatiya Janata Party, he has served as the 10th Chief Minister of Haryana from 26 October 2014 until his resignation on 12 March 2024 and also served as leader of the house in legislative assembly.

In the 2024 Indian general election, he has been elected to the Lok Sabha, the lower house of the Parliament of India, from Karnal, Haryana. While serving as Chief Minister, he represented the Karnal constituency in the Haryana Legislative Assembly from 2014 to 2024. He has also been a RSS pracharak and has served as the Organizational General Secretary of the BJP in Haryana from 2000 to 2014.

== Personal life ==
Manohar Lal Khattar was born on 5 May 1954 in Nindana, East Punjab, into a Punjabi Hindu family. His father, Harbans Lal Khattar, had migrated to the village from the Jhang district of West Punjab following the Partition of India in 1947. His family initially settled in the Banyani village of Rohtak district and took up farming.

Khattar completed his matriculation (final year of high school) from Pandit Neki Ram Sharma Government College, Rohtak. He then moved in with relatives in Delhi, and ran a cloth shop with them near Sadar Bazar while completing his bachelor's degree from University of Delhi.

== Political career ==
Khattar joined Rashtriya Swayamsevak Sangh (RSS) in 1977 and became a full-time pracharak three years later. As a pracharak, he is a lifelong bachelor. He worked as a full-time pracharak for 17 years before moving to BJP, in 1994.

During 2000–2014, Khattar was Organizational General Secretary of the BJP in Haryana. During his tenure the state unit also started publication of Bhajpa Ki Baat magazine in October 2000. He was the Chairman of BJP's Haryana Election Campaign Committee for 2014 Lok Sabha Elections. Subsequently, he became a member of BJP's National Executive Committee.

In 2014, Khattar was nominated as BJP's candidate from Karnal constituency for the Haryana Legislative Assembly election. The party's workers and supporters in Karnal launched a signature campaign, asking the party leadership to field a local candidate instead of him. His opponent, the Indian National Congress candidate and Deepender Singh Hooda, accused Khattar of being an "outsider" not native to Karnal. But Modi wave helped Mr. Khattar win elections by heavy margin.

=== Chief minister (2014-2024) ===
In the elections, the BJP gained a majority in Haryana for the first time, and Khattar won his maiden election by a margin of 63,736 votes. During a party meeting, his name was proposed for the Chief Minister of Haryana post by Haryana BJP President Ram Bilas Sharma, seconded by other strong Chief Minister of Haryana claimant Rao Inderjeet Singh and supported by many MLAs. He became the BJP's first Chief Minister of Haryana after his swearing-in ceremony on 26 October 2014.

On 27 October 2019, Khattar was sworn in as the Chief Minister for the second time, after making an alliance with Dushyant Chautala's Jannayak Janta Party post 2019 Haryana Legislative Assembly election.

Khattar submitted his resignation to Haryana Governor Bandaru Dattatreya on 12 March 2024 after the development came amid speculation of cracks emerging in the state's ruling BJP and Jannayak Janta Party (JJP) coalition over seat sharing ahead of the 2024 Lok Sabha elections, and on 13 March he tendered his resignation from the Haryana Legislative Assembly.

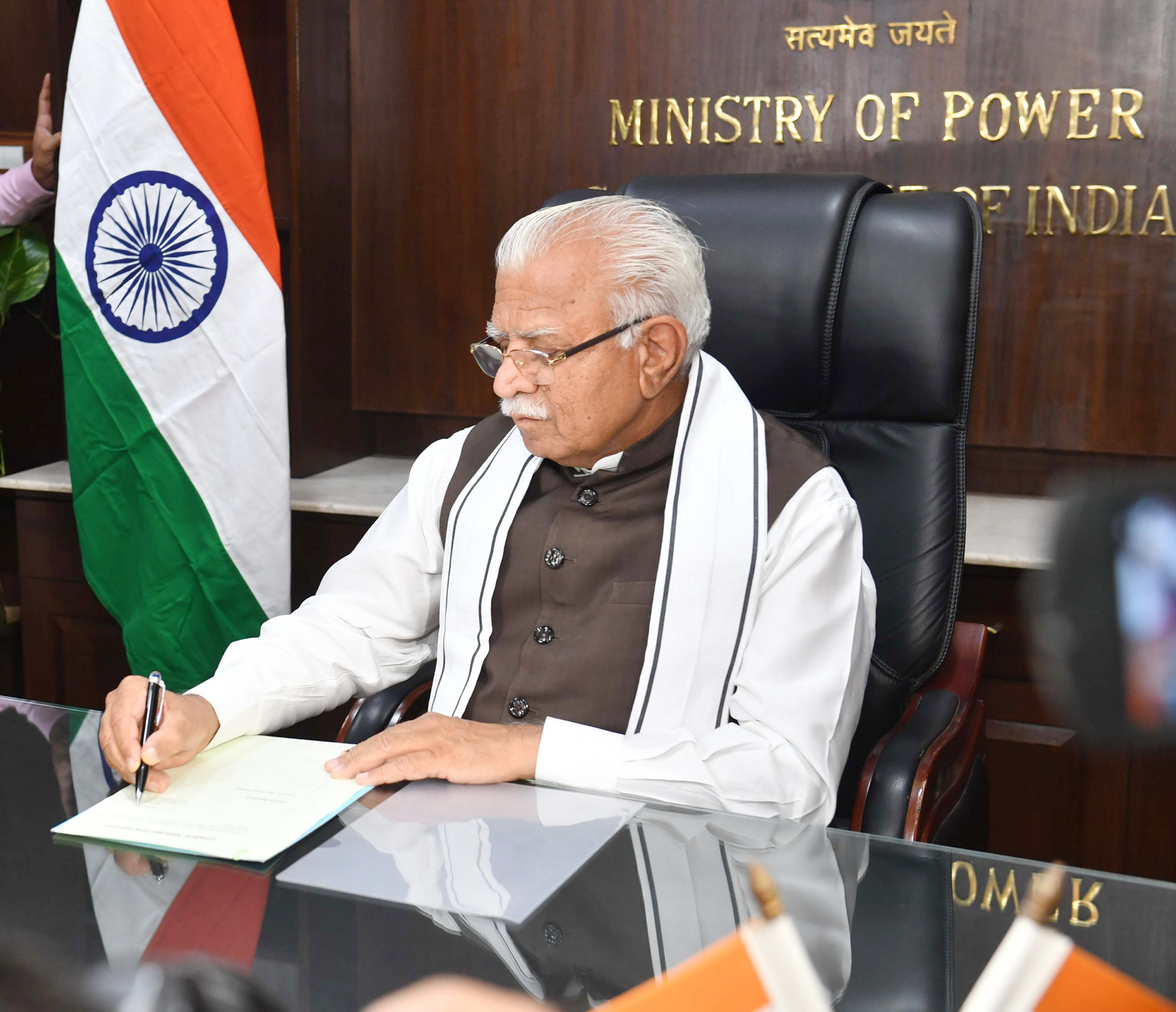
Manohar Lal assuming charge as the Union Minister for Power.

In March 2024, he was announced as the BJP candidate for the Karnal constituency in the 2024 Indian general election. Khattar subsequently won from the seat.

=== Union Minister (2024-) ===
In June 2024, Khattar was appointed the Minister of Power and Minister of Housing and Urban Affairs.

In April 2026, Khattar visited Bhutan in his capacity as Union Minister of Power, meeting with Bhutan's Energy Minister to discuss strengthening bilateral energy cooperation and reviewing the progress of the Punatsangchhu hydropower projects, which are jointly developed by India and Bhutan.

== Major initiatives ==
=== Police reforms ===
Haryana Control of Organized Crime Act was enacted under Khattar 's rule of the state, which intends to combat organised crime syndicates and gangs of the state.

=== E-governance ===
Khattar introduced e-services through Common Service Centres including biometric attendance system in all the government offices through which attendance of all officers will be available online and monitored.

=== Women's empowerment ===
Khattar's government took steps to implement Beti Bachao, Beti Padhao Yojana scheme. The child gender ratio has improved in Haryana since he assumed power. "Efforts are being made to further take it (child gender ratio) to above 900," Khattar said in a public statement.

== Controversies ==
Manohar Lal Khattar has been criticised for his remarks on rape and women issues. During his election campaign for 2014 polls in India, he said: "If they (women) want freedom, why don't they just roam around naked? Freedom has to be limited." Likewise, on 16 November 2018, he has stated, "The biggest concern is that in 80-90% of rapes and eve-teasing cases, the accused and the victim know each other. In many cases, they know each other for a long time, and on one day, when there is an argument,... an FIR is lodged, saying that this person has raped me." This evoked strong condemnation from the opposition. On 3 April 2023, he again stirred a controversy by remarking that a "[high court] judge needed to be "fixed". The opposition claimed this was interference with the judiciary and have demanded an apology and that a contempt of court notice be issued against him.

== See also ==
- Manohar Lal Khattar ministry (2014–)
- Third Modi ministry

Preceded by Bhupinder Singh Hooda	Chief Minister of Haryana; 26 October 2014 – 12 October 2024	Succeeded by Nayab Singh Saini
