= Nayab Singh Saini =

11th Chief Minister of Haryana since 2024 (born 1970)

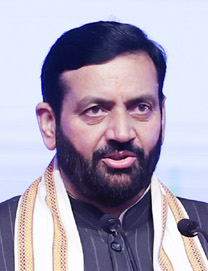
- Saini in 2024

11th Chief Minister of Haryana
- Incumbent
- Assumed office 12 March 2024
- Governor: Bandaru Dattatreya; Ashim Kumar Ghosh
- Cabinet: Saini I; Saini II
- Ministry and Departments: List: *Home Affairs; Finance; Law and Justice; Excise and Taxation; Town and Country planning; Information; Language and Culture; General Administration; Personal and Training; Other departments not allotted to any minister
- Preceded by: Manohar Lal Khattar

President of the Bharatiya Janata Party, Haryana
- In office 28 October 2023 – 9 July 2024
- National President: J. P. Nadda
- Preceded by: Om Prakash Dhankar
- Succeeded by: Mohan Lal Badoli

Member of Parliament, Lok Sabha
- In office 23 May 2019 – 12 March 2024
- Preceded by: Raj Kumar Saini
- Succeeded by: Naveen Jindal
- Constituency: Kurukshetra, Haryana

Minister of State, Government of Haryana
- In office 24 July 2015 – 3 June 2019
- Ministry: Term
- Labour & Employment (Independent Charge): 22 July 2016 – 3 June 2019
- Mines & Geology: 24 July 2015 – 3 June 2019
- New & Renewable Energy: 24 July 2015 – 22 July 2016

Member of the Haryana Legislative Assembly
- Incumbent
- Assumed office 8 October 2024
- Preceded by: Mewa Singh Singroha
- Constituency: Ladwa
- In office 4 June 2024 – 8 October 2024
- Preceded by: Manohar Lal Khattar
- Succeeded by: Jagmohan Anand
- Constituency: Karnal
- In office 26 October 2014 – 23 May 2019
- Preceded by: Ramkishan Gurjar
- Succeeded by: Shalley Chaudhary
- Constituency: Naraingarh

Personal details
- Born: 25 January 1970 (age 56) Mirzapur Majra, Haryana, India
- Party: Bharatiya Janata Party
- Children: 2
- Education: B. R. Ambedkar Bihar University (B.A.), Chaudhary Charan Singh University (LL.B.)
- Occupation: Politician

Nayab Singh Saini (born 25 January 1970) is an Indian politician serving as the chief minister of Haryana from 2024. Saini is one of the top leaders from the Bharatiya Janata Party in Haryana. Saini was appointed as the chief minister of the state in March 2024, succeeding Manohar Lal Khattar, continuing in office for the remainder of the term in the fourteenth assembly. He was reappointed as the chief minister for the second term after he led the BJP to victory in the 2024 Haryana Legislative Assembly election. Saini himself won from Ladwa Assembly constituency of Kurukshetra district, defeating the incumbent Mewa Singh of Indian National Congress, and the BJP formed the government for the third consecutive term.

Previously, he was president of Haryana state unit of Bharatiya Janata Party from 2023 till 2024. Earlier, Saini served as the Member of parliament (M.P.) from Kurukshetra Lok Sabha constituency, Haryana, from 2019 to 2024. Before that, he was a member of the Haryana Legislative Assembly (M.L.A.) from Naraingarh Assembly constituency (Ambala district) from 2014 to 2019. He served as the Minister of State in Government of Haryana from 2015 to 2019. Coming from a Other Backward Class (OBC) background, Saini joined the BJP party unit in Ambala and steadily rose through the ranks, often working closely with party leader, Manohar Lal Khattar.

== Early life and education ==
Nayab Singh Saini was born in the small village of Mizapur Majra near Ambala, Haryana, India on 25 January 1970 in a Saini (Note: Some people link Saini to Mali caste) family. Saini, originally belongs to Mangoli Jattan village of Kurukshetra, though his family shifted to Mirzapur in Ambala district a long time ago.

Saini is a law graduate and did his LLB degree from Chaudhary Charan Singh University, Meerut. Earlier, he did his B.A. degree from B. R. Ambedkar B. University, Muzaffarpur.

== Political career ==
=== Early career: Pre-2014 (Ambala youth wing) ===
Saini joined the BJP party unit in Ambala. Initially, he started working as a computer operator in the BJP's Ambala party office and eventually became the general secretary of Haryana BJP's Kisan Morcha (farmers’ front). He became an active member of BJP's Ambala youth wing, and he was recognized by Manohar Lal Khattar.

Saini also became a supporter of cow protectionism in Haryana like several other leaders of BJP-RSS background, noting that the ordinary people of Haryana have deep respect for the cow, though he condemned any lynching incident. He contested the election in Naraingarh constituency of Ambala district in 2010 but was defeated by Ramkishan Gurjar. While he lost his first election, he was becoming recognized as an OBC face in the BJP's Ambala unit.

=== Mid Career: 2014 -2023 (MLA & MP) ===
In 2014, Saini contested the Haryana state elections from Naraingarh Assembly constituency (Ambala district) as a BJP candidate and won the MLA election by 24,361 votes to become a member of the Haryana Legislative Assembly from Naraingarh Assembly constituency from 2014 to 2019. He served as the Minister of State, Government of Haryana from 2015 to 2019.

In 2019 Indian general election he was elected as Member of Parliament from Kurukshetra. In 2023, he was appointed the president of the Haryana unit of the BJP.

=== Prime Career 2024 onwards (Chief Ministership) ===
Saini, who was the president of BJP state unit was declared the new Chief Minister of Haryana on 12 March 2024 after incumbent Manohar Lal Khattar resigned as Chief Minister before 2024 Lok Sabha election. After the resignation of Manohar Lal Khattar, Saini was elected as the Leader of BJP's Legislative Party and subsequently took oath as the Chief Minister of Haryana. (He also won by-poll from Khattar's former constituency Karnal in May 2024).

In October 2024, Saini won the Haryana Assembly Election from Ladwa seat (Kurukshetra district) and also became the second time Chief Minister of Haryana on 17 October 2024. According to political analysts, the elevation of Nayab Singh Saini as Chief Minister in March 2024 helped BJP win the 2024 Haryana elections, as the party was able to consolidate the votes from the OBC community, while and also gaining some Scheduled Caste (SC) voters, through new development schemes.

== Developmental initiatives as CM (2024 onwards) ==
=== Hike in expenditure limit of Gram Panchayats ===
For a long period, the Sarpanch Associations of Haryana demanded that the expenditure limit of the Gram Panchayats should be increased as it becomes difficult to implement various developmental initiatives in the villages due to fund crunch. Going by the demands, Saini government in July 2024 implemented the government resolution of increasing the expenditure limit of the Gram Panchayats to implement various developmental initiatives in the villages. The hike in expenditure limit was made from ₹ 5 lakh to ₹ 21 lakh, which enabled Panchayats to garner enough funds without floating e-tenders.

=== Reduction of tariff on electricity ===
Saini government also abolished the minimum charges that were levied on state's electricity consumers and announced that after the abolition, the electricity bill to be paid by the consumers will be solely based on units of electricity consumed. Saini also launched a state subsidy scheme under "Pradhan Mantri Surya Ghar Muft Bijli Yojna". Under this scheme, Rs 60,000 was sanctioned by central government, for setting up a rooftop solar plant for poor families having an annual income of less than Rs 1,80,000. Saini government thus planned an additional subsidy of Rs 50,000 from the state's exchequer. Since, the cost of installing a rooftop solar plant then was Rs 1,10,000, Saini administration planned to set up these plants completely from the expenses of central and state government, putting no financial burden on the citizens.

=== Affordable housing scheme ===
In July 2024, the state cabinet of Haryana under CM Saini launched two affordable housing schemes, one for urban poor and another for rural poor. The housing scheme for urban poor from the Economically Weaker Sections of society was called "Mukhyamantri Seheri Awas Yojna". As per this scheme, the poor families having annual income of up to ₹ 1.80 lakh were eligible for the financial assistance of 1.5 lakh provided by state government for building their own pucca house. The scheme provided 30 square yard plot for each beneficiary family as well to construct their houses.

== See also ==
- Ashok Gehlot
- Samrat Chaudhary
- Keshav Prasad Maurya
