= Haryana Vikas Party =

Political party in India

- Leader: Bansi Lal
- Secretary: Chaudhary Surender Singh
- Founder: Bansi Lal
- Founded: 1996
- Dissolved: 2004
- Split from: Indian National Congress
- Merged into: Indian National Congress
- ECI Status: dissolved party
- Alliance: National Democratic Alliance (1996-1999)

Election symbol

Haryana Vikas Party (HVP) (translation: Haryana Development Party) was a political party in the Indian state of Haryana. Its president was Bansi Lal and general secretary Chaudhary Surender Singh.

After parted company with Congress in 1996, Bansi Lal set up the Haryana Vikas Party and his campaign against prohibition propelled him to power in the assembly polls the same year. On 14 October 2004 HVP merged with the Indian National Congress.

== Electoral performance ==
=== General election results ===
Year	Legislature	Seats won	Change in seats	Percentage of votes
1991	10th Lok Sabha	1 / 543	New	0.12
1996	11th Lok Sabha	3 / 543	▲2	0.35
1998	12th Lok Sabha	1 / 543	▼2	0.24
1999	13th Lok Sabha	0 / 543	▼1	0.05

=== Haryana Legislative assembly elections ===
Year	seats contested	Seats won	Change in seats	Overall votes	Percentage of votes	Ref.
1991	61	12 / 90	New	775,375	12.54%	
1996	65	33 / 90	▲22	17,16,572	22.7%	
2000	82	2 / 90	▼31		5.5%	

== See also ==
- Indian National Congress breakaway parties
