= Aravalli Range =

Mountain range in western India

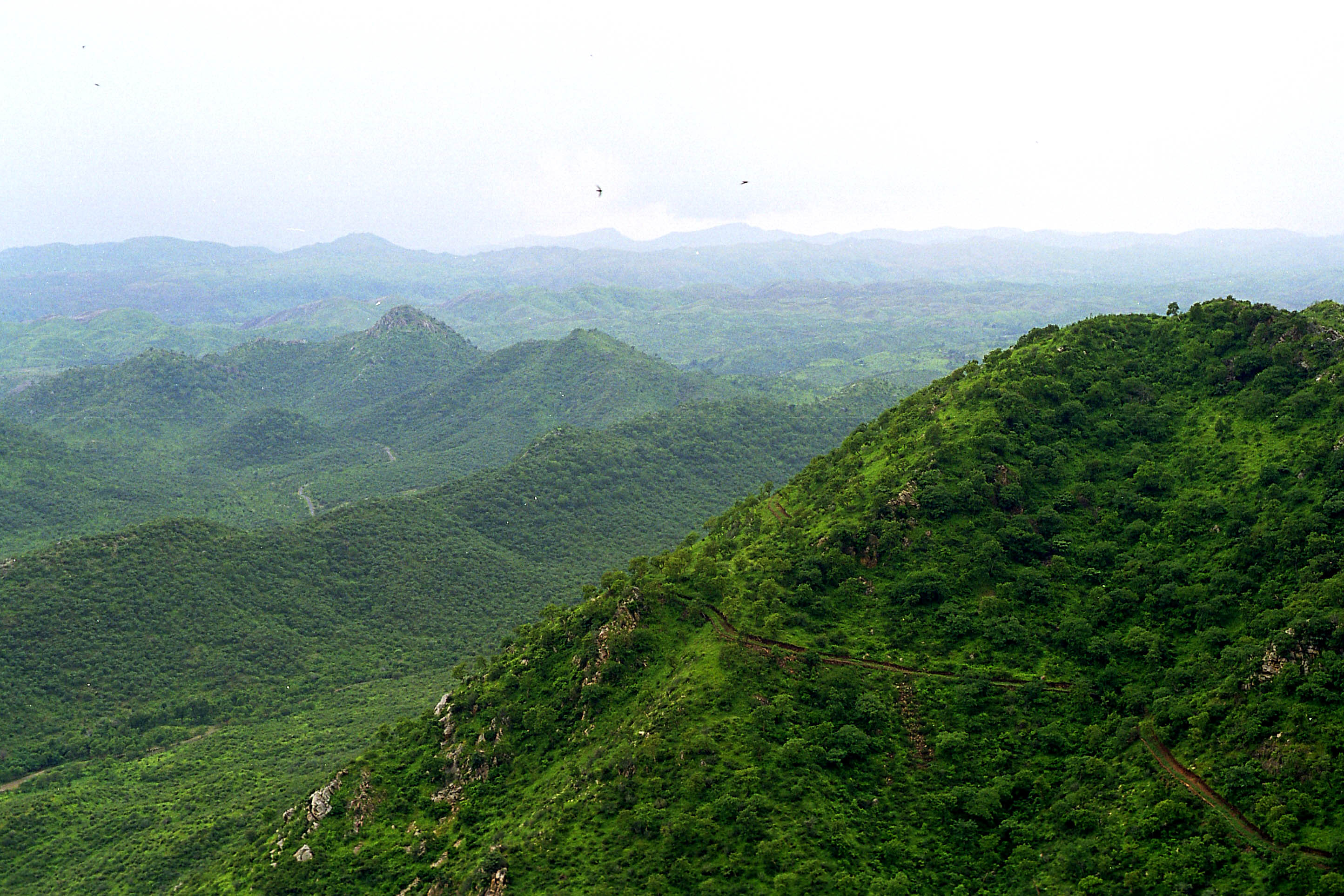
- The Aravali Range in Rajasthan

Highest point
- Peak: Guru Shikhar, Mount Abu
- Elevation: 1,722 m (5,650 ft)
- Coordinates: 24°35′33″N 74°42′30″E

Dimensions
- Length: 670 km (420 mi)

Naming
- Pronunciation: Hindi pronunciation: [əɾaːʋ(ə)li]

Geography
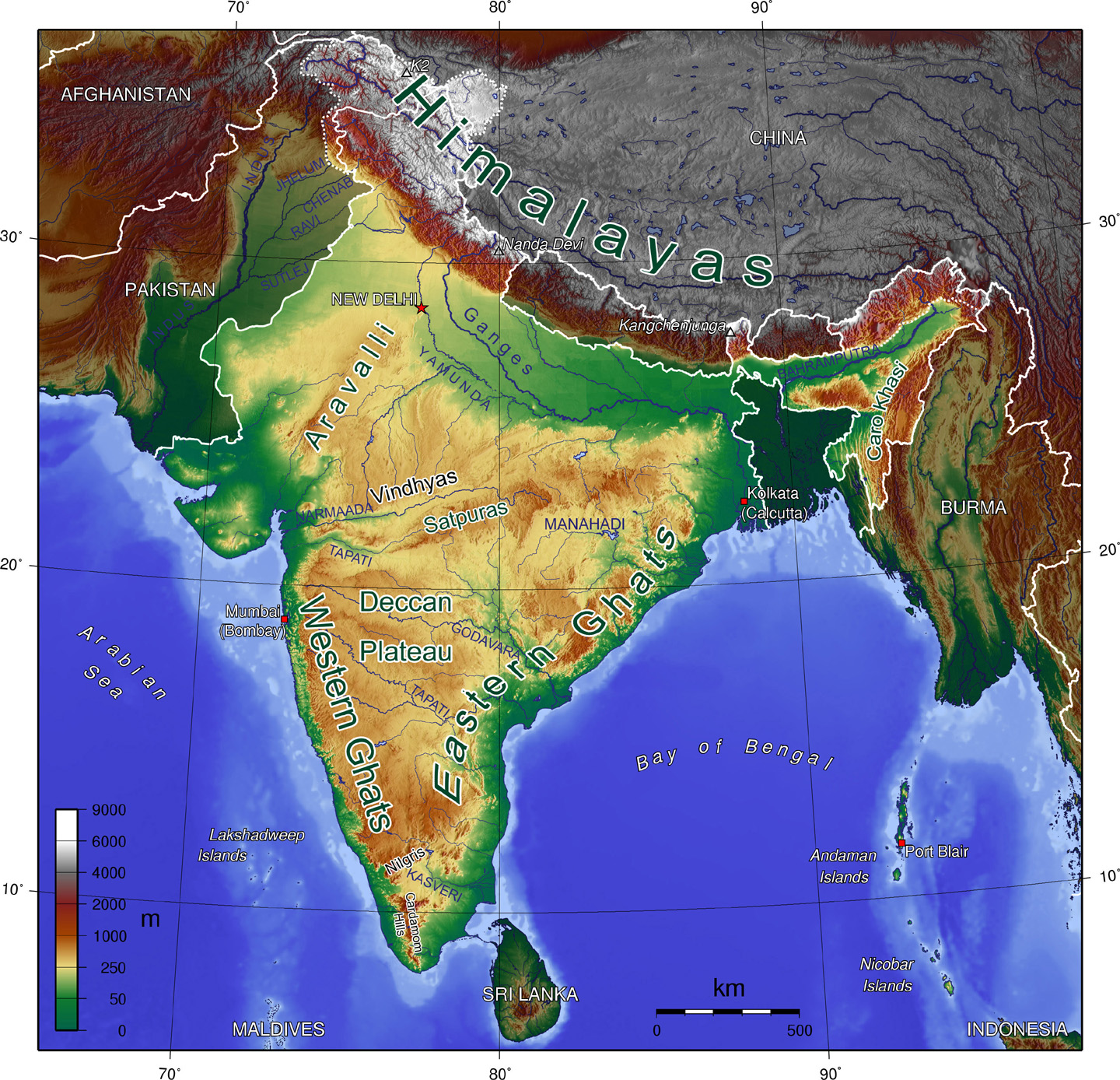
- Topographic map of India showing the range
- Country: India
- States: Rajasthan; Haryana; Delhi; Gujarat
- Regions: North India; Western India
- Rivers: Banas; Luni; Sakhi; Sabarmati
- Settlements: Delhi; Gurgaon; Mount Abu
- Range coordinates: 25°00′N 73°30′E

Geology
- Orogeny: Aravalli-Delhi Orogen
- Rock age: Precambrian
- Rock type(s): Fold mountains from plate tectonics: Igneous rock granite and gneiss

The Aravalli Range (IPA: [əɾaːʋliː], also spelled Aravali) is a mountain range in north-western India. running approximately 670 km (420 mi) in a south-west direction, starting near Delhi, passing through southern Haryana and Rajasthan, and ending in Ahmedabad, Gujarat. The highest peak is Guru Shikhar in Mount Abu, Rajasthan at 1,722 m (5,650 ft). The Aravalli Range is the oldest fold-mountain belt in India, dating back to the Paleoproterozoic era.

== Etymology ==
Aravalli, a composite Sanskrit word from the roots "ara" and "vali", literally means the "line of peaks".

== Natural history ==
=== Geology ===
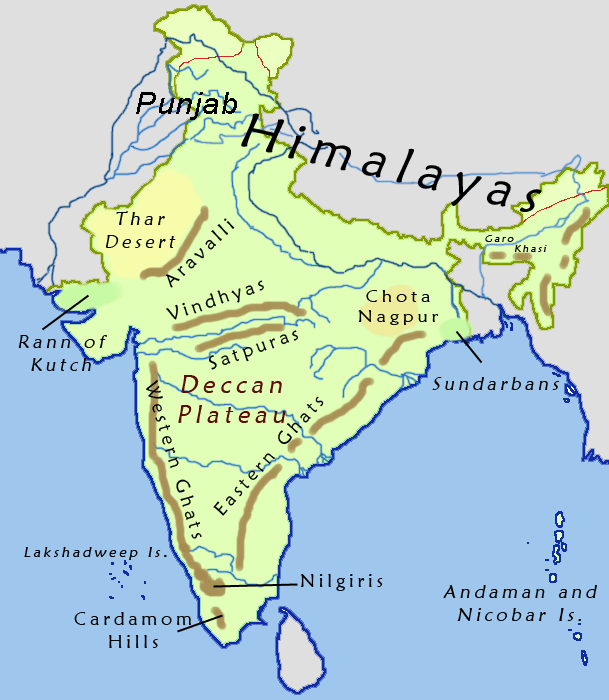
Map of prominent mountain ranges in India, showing Aravalli in north-west India

The Aravalli Range, an eroded stub of ancient mountains, is believed to be the oldest range of fold mountains in India. The natural history of the Aravalli Range dates back to times when the Indian Plate was separated from the Eurasian Plate by an ocean. The Proterozoic Aravalli-Delhi orogenic belt in northwest India is similar to the younger Himalayan-type orogenic belts of the Mesozoic-Cenozoic era (of the Phanerozoic) in terms of component parts and appears to have passed through a near-orderly Wilson supercontinental cycle of events. The range rose in a Precambrian event called the Aravalli-Delhi Orogen. The Aravalli Range is a northeast–southwest trending orogenic belt located in the northwestern part of Indian Peninsula. It is part of the Indian Shield that formed from a series of cratonic collisions. In ancient times, Aravalli were extremely high but since have worn down almost completely from millions of years of weathering, whereas the Himalayas, young fold mountains, are still continuously rising. Aravalli have stopped growing higher due to the cessation of upward thrust caused by the tectonic plates in the Earth's crust below them. The Aravalli Range joins two of the ancient Earth's crust segments that make up the greater Indian craton, the Aravalli Craton which is the Marwar segment of Earth's crust to the northwest of the Aravalli Range, and the Bundelkand Craton segment of the Earth's crust to the southeast of the Aravalli Range. Cratons, generally found in the interiors of tectonic plates, are old and stable parts of the continental lithosphere that have remained relatively undeformed during the cycles of merging and rifting of continents.

Volcanic arc and geological process of undersea subduction during tectonic collusion

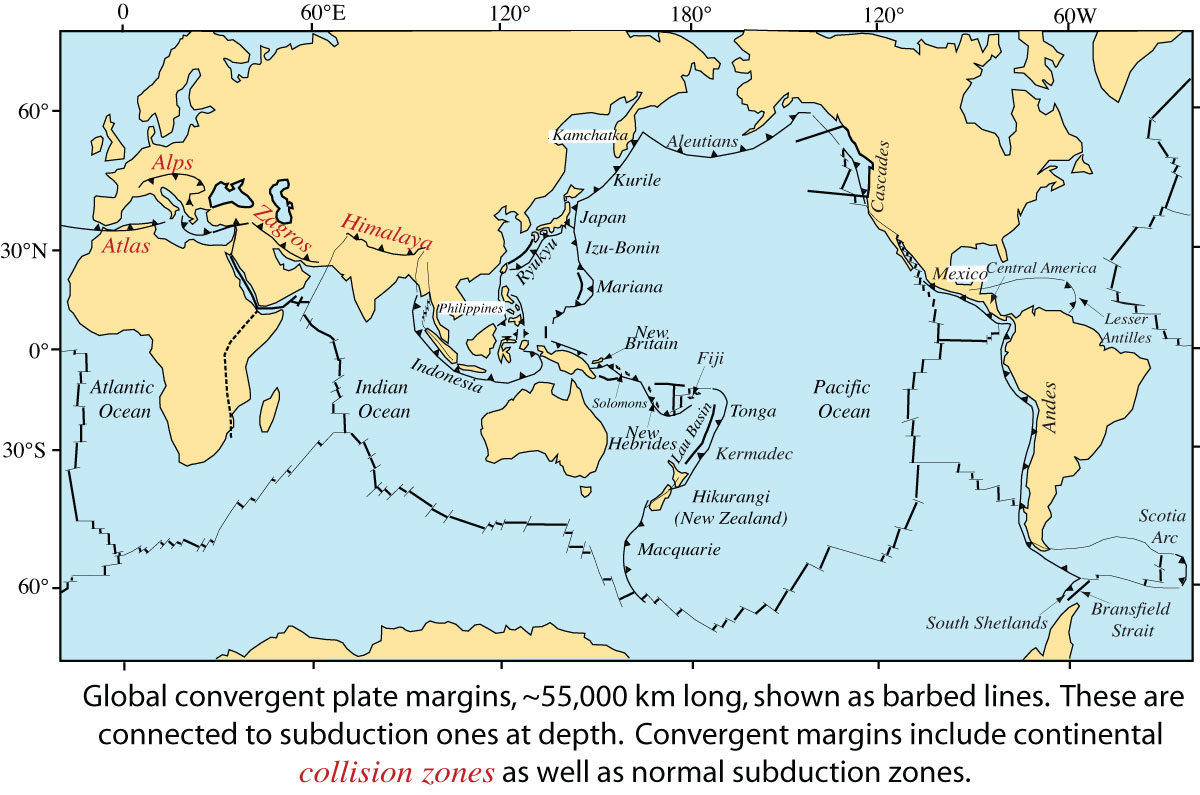
Global convergent boundary of plate margins

It consists of two main sequences formed in the Proterozoic eon, metasedimentary rock (sedimentary rocks metamorphosed under pressure and heat without melting) and metavolcanic rock (metamorphosed volcanic rocks) sequences of the Aravalli Supergroup and Delhi Supergroup. These two supergroups rest over the Archean Bhilwara Gneissic Complex basement, which is a gneissic (high-grade metamorphism of sedimentary or igneous rocks) basement formed during the archean eon 4 Ga ago. It started as an inverted basin, that rifted and pulled apart into granitoid basement, initially during Aravalli passive rifting around 2.5 to 2.0 Ga years ago and then during Delhi active rifting around 1.9 to 1.6 Ga years ago. It started with rifting of a rigid Archaean continent banded gneissic complex around 2.2 Ga with the coexisting formation of the Bhilwara aulacogen in its eastern part and eventual rupturing and separation of the continent along a line parallel to the Rakhabdev (Rishabhdev) lineament to the west, simultaneous development of a passive continental margin with the undersea shelf rise sediments of the Aravalli-Jharol belts depositing on the attenuated crust on the eastern flank of the separated continent, subsequent destruction of the continental margin by accretion of the Delhi island arc (a type of archipelago composed of an arc-shaped chain of volcanoes closely situated parallel to a convergent boundary between two converging tectonic plates) from the west around 1.5 Ga. This tectonic plates collision event involved early thrusting with partial obduction (overthrusting of oceanic lithosphere onto continental lithosphere at a convergent plate boundary) of the oceanic crust along the Rakhabdev lineament, flattening and eventual wrenching (also called strike-slip plate fault, sideways horizontal movement of colliding plates with no vertical motion) parallel to the collision zone. Associated mafic igneous rocks show both continental and oceanic tholeiitic geochemistry (magnesium and iron-rich igneous rocks) from the Phanerozoic eon (541–0 million) with rift-related magmatic rock formations.

The Aravalli-Delhi Orogen is an orogen event that led to a large structural deformation of the Earth's lithosphere (crust and uppermost mantle, such as Aravalli and Himalayas fold mountains) due to the interaction between tectonic plates when a continental plate is crumpled and is pushed upwards to form mountain ranges, and involve a great range of geological processes collectively called orogenesis.

=== Minerals ===
The archean basement had served as a rigid indentor which controlled the overall wedge shaped geometry of the orogen. Lithology of area shows that the base rocks of Aravalli are of Mewar Gneiss formed by high-grade regional metamorphic processes from preexisting formations that were originally sedimentary rock with earliest life form that were formed during the archean eon, these contain fossils of unicellular organism such as green algae and cyanobacteria in stromatolitic carbonate ocean reefs formed during the paleoproterozoic era. Sedimentary exhalative deposits of base metal sulfide ores formed extensively along several, long, linear zones in the Bhilwara aulacogen or produced local concentration in the rifted Aravalli continental margin, where rich stromatolitic phosphorites also formed. Tectonic evolution of the Aravalli Mountains shows Mewar Gneiss rocks are overlain by Delhi Supergroup type of rocks that also have post-Aravalli intrusions. Metal sulfide ores were formed in two different epochs, lead and zinc sulfide ores were formed in the sedimentary rocks around 1.8 Ga years ago during Paleoproterozoic phase. The tectonic setting of zinc-lead-copper sulfides mineralisation in the Delhi supergroup rocks in Haryana-Delhi were formed by mantle plume volcanic action around one billion years ago covering Haryana and Rajasthan during the mesoproterozoic. In the southern part of the Aravalli supergroup arc base metal sulfides were generated near the subduction zone on the western fringe and in zones of back-arc extension to the south-east. Continued subduction produced tungsten-tin mineralisation in S-type (sedimentary unmetamorphosed rock), felsic (volcanic rock), and plutons (crystallised solidified magma). This includes commercially viable quantities of minerals, such as rock phosphate, lead-zinc-silver mineral deposits at Zawar, Rikahbdev serpentinite, talc, pyrophyllite, asbestos, apatite, kyanite and beryl.

=== Mining ===
Mining of copper and other metals in the Aravalli Range dates back to at least the 5th century BCE, based on carbon dating. Recent research indicates that copper was already mined here during the Sothi-Siswal period going back to c. 4000 BCE. Ancient Kalibangan and Kunal, Haryana settlements obtained copper here.

=== Geographical features ===
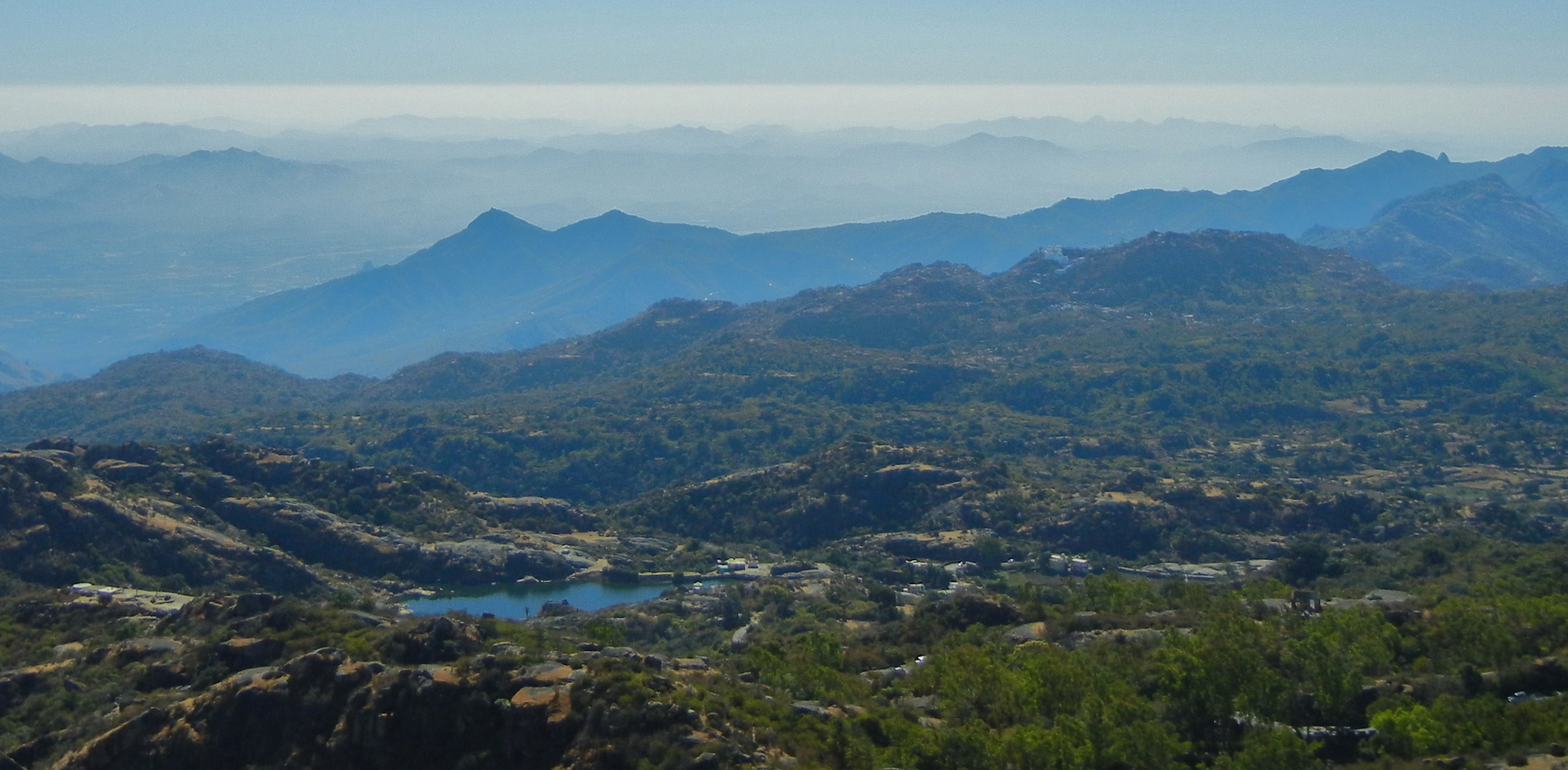
The Aravalli Range, seen from the range's highest point at Guru Shikhar, in Rajasthan.

The Indian Craton includes five major cratons. Cratons are part of continental crust made up of upper layer called platforms and older bottom layer called basement rocks. shields are part of a craton where basement rock crops out at the surface and it is the relatively oldest and most stable part that are undeformed by the plate tectonics. The Aravalli Craton (Marwar-Mewar Craton or Western Indian Craton) covers Rajasthan as well as western and southern Haryana. It includes the Mewar Craton in the east and Marwar Craton in the west. It is limited by the Great Boundary Fault in the east, the Thar Desert in the west, Indo-gangetic alluvium in the north, and the Son River-Narmada River-Tapti River basins in the south. It mainly has quartzite, marble, pelite, greywacke and extinct volcanos exposed in the Aravalli-Delhi Orogen. Malani Igneous Suite is the largest in India and third largest igneous suit in the world. The uniqueness of the geological feature of Malani Igneous Suite at Jodhpur prompted the Geological Survey of India to declare the site as a National Geological Monument.

==== Tectonic-stratigraphic evolution ====
Tectonic-stratigraphic evolution of the Aravalli Range:

- Neoproterozoic: Marwar Group
- 500–550 Ma: Malani Igneous Suite
- 720–750 Ma: Sindhrath/Punagarh Group
- 800–850 Ma: Sirohi Group
- 900 Ma: Erinpura granite
- Mesoproterozoic: Delhi Supergroup
- 1100–900 Ma: South Delhi fold belt
- 1600–1450 Ma: North Delhi fold belt
- Paleoproterozoic: Hindoli Group
- 1800–1700 Ma: Sandmata Complex
- 2200–1800 Ma: Aravalli Supergroup and mineralised basin at Rajpura-Dariba
- Neoarchean (2900–2600 Ma): Mangalwar Complex with Bhilwara Group
- Mesoarchean (3300–3000 Ma): Mewar gneiss with Jagat Supergroup

==== Stratigraphic classification ====
The stratigraphic classification of the Aravalli Range can be divided into the following parts (north to south direction):

- The Archean basement is a banded gneissic complex with schists (medium grade metamorphic rock), gneisses (high grade regional metamorphic rock), composite gneiss and quartzites. It forms the basement rock for both the Delhi Supergroup and the Aravalli Supergroup.
- Aravalli Supergroup: The Aravalli supergroup passes through Rajasthan state, dividing it into two halves, with three-fifths of Rajasthan on the western side towards the Thar Desert and two-thirds on the eastern side consisting of the catchment area of Banas and Chambal rivers bordering the state of Madhya Pradesh. Guru Shikhar, the highest peak in the Aravalli Range at 5,650 feet (1,720 m) in Mount Abu of Rajasthan, lies near the south-western extremity of the Central Aravalli range, close to the border with Gujarat state. The southern Aravalli Supergroup enters the northeast of Gujarat near Modasa where it lends its name to the Aravalli district, and ends at the centre of the state at Palanpur near Ahmedabad.
  - Champaner Group is a rectangular outcrop composed of subgreywacke, siliceous phyllite, pelitic schist, quartzite and pertomict conglomerate.
  - Lunavada Group is a polygon area in the south of the Aravali Orogen composed of greywacke-phyllite
  - Jharol Group is spread over 200 km^{2} area with average width of 40 km carbonate-free phyllite and arenite with turbidite facies and argillaceous rocks.
  - Udaipur Group is a thick accumulation of greywacke-phyllite basement overlain by dolomite.
  - Debari Group consists of Carbonates, Quartzite, and Pelitic rocks which are overlain by the Delwara group.
  - Delwara Group is spread over a 500 km^{2} area with average thickness of 500 m and includes basement orthoquartzite overlain by volcanic conglomerate.
  - Unconformities
    - Mangalwar/Sandmata Complex and Mewar Gneiss with enclaves of the Jagat group
- Delhi Supergroup
  - Alwar Group with arenaceous and mafic volcanic rocks
    - Delhi Ridge, in the north
    - Haryana Aravalli ranges, in the west
      - Tosham Hill range basement rocks include quartzite with chiastolite, the upper layers of quartz porphyry ring dyke, felsite, welded tuff and muscovite biotite granite rocks which have commercially nonviable tin, tungsten and copper. The Tosham Hill range, west of Bhiwani in Haryana, is the northernmost end of the Aravalli range. A northeastern extension of the Aravalli extends to the national capital of India also. Locally known as a ridge it diagonally traverses to the South Delhi (hills of Asola Bhatti Wildlife Sanctuary), where at the hills of Bandhwari, it meets the HaryanaAravalli range consisting of various isolated hills and rocky ridges passing along the southern border of Haryana.
      - Madhogarh hill
      - Satnali hill
      - Nuh-Ferozepur Jhirka hill range, runs along Haryana-Rajasthan border from Nuh to the south of Ferozepur Jhirka.
    - Rajasthan Alwar range, in the east
  - Ajabgarh Group – Kumbhalgarh Group with carbonate, mafic volcanic and argillaceous rocks
  - Raialo Group with mafic volcanic and calcareous rocks

== Human history ==
=== Tosham Hills - Indus Civilisation mines ===
The Tosham hills have several Indus Valley Civilisation sites in and around the hill range as the area falls under copper-bearing zone of Southwest Haryana and Northeast Rajasthan of Aravalli hill range.

Investigation of IVC network of mineral ore needs for metallurgical work and trade, shows that the most common type of grinding stone at Harappa is of Delhi quartzite type found only in the westernmost outliers of the Aravalli Range in southern Haryana near Kaliana and Makanwas villages of Bhiwani district. The quartzite is red-pink to pinkish grey in colour and is crisscrossed with thin haematite and quartz filled fractures with sugary size grain texture.

Ravindra Nath Singh and his team of Banaras Hindu University carried out ASI-financed excavations of Indus Valley Civilisation site on the grounds of the Government School in Khanak, during 2014 and 2016. They found early to mature Harappan phase IVC materials, pottery, semiprecious beads of lapis lazuli, carnelian and others. They also found evidence of metallurgical activities, such as crucibles (used for pouring molten metal), furnace lining, burnt floor, ash and ore slugs. Ceramic petrography, metallography, scanning electron microscope (SEM, non-destructive, surface images of nanoscale resolution), energy-dispersive X-ray spectroscopy (EDXA and EDXMA non-destructive, qualitative and quantitative elemental composition) and transmission electron microscopy (TEM, destructive method) scientific studies of the material found prove that the Khanak site was inhabited by the IVC metal-workers who used the locally mined polymetallic tin, and they were also familiar with metallurgical work with copper and bronze. The lowest level of site dates back as far the pre-Harappan era to Sothi-Siswal culture (6600 BP) tentatively.

=== Ganeshwar Sunari Cultural Complex ===
The Ganeshwar Sunari Cultural Complex (GSCC) is a collection of third millennium BCE settlements in the area of the Aravalli Hill Range. Among them, there are similarities in material culture, and in the production of copper tools. They are located near the copper mines.

"The GSCC is east of the Harappan culture, to the north-east of Ahar–Banas Complex, north/north west to the Kayatha Culture and at a later date, west of the OCP-Copper Hoard sites (Ochre Coloured Pottery culture–Copper Hoard culture). Located within the regions of the Aravalli Hill Range, primarily along the Kantli, Sabi, Sota, Dohan and Bondi rivers, the GJCC is the largest copper producing community in third millennium BCE South Asia, with 385 sites documented. Archaeological indicators of the GSCC were documented primarily in Jaipur, Jhunjhunu, and Sikar districts of Rajasthan, India ..."

Pottery found in the area include incised ware, and reserved slipware.

There are two main type sites, Ganeshwar, and Sunari, in Tehsil Kot Putli, Jaipur district (Geo coordinates: N 27° 35' 51", 76° 06' 85" E).

=== 2025 Supreme Court orders ===
On 20th November 2025 Supreme Court issued an order stating that landforms rising over 100 meters with respect to surrounding terrain would be considered as Aravalli Hills and two such hills within 500 meters of each other with land between them are considered an Aravalli Range. Hills under 100 m can be used for mining, making buildings and for other works. However, on 29th December the Supreme Court stayed its order following protests by residents, farmers, environmentalists, lawyers and political parties. On June 3, 2026, the Supreme Court set up a five-member expert committee led by Kanchan Devi, the head of the Indian Council of Forestry Research and Education (ICFRE). This team was given the job of clearing up confusion around the definition of the hills and must submit their final report by August 31, 2026.

== Environment ==
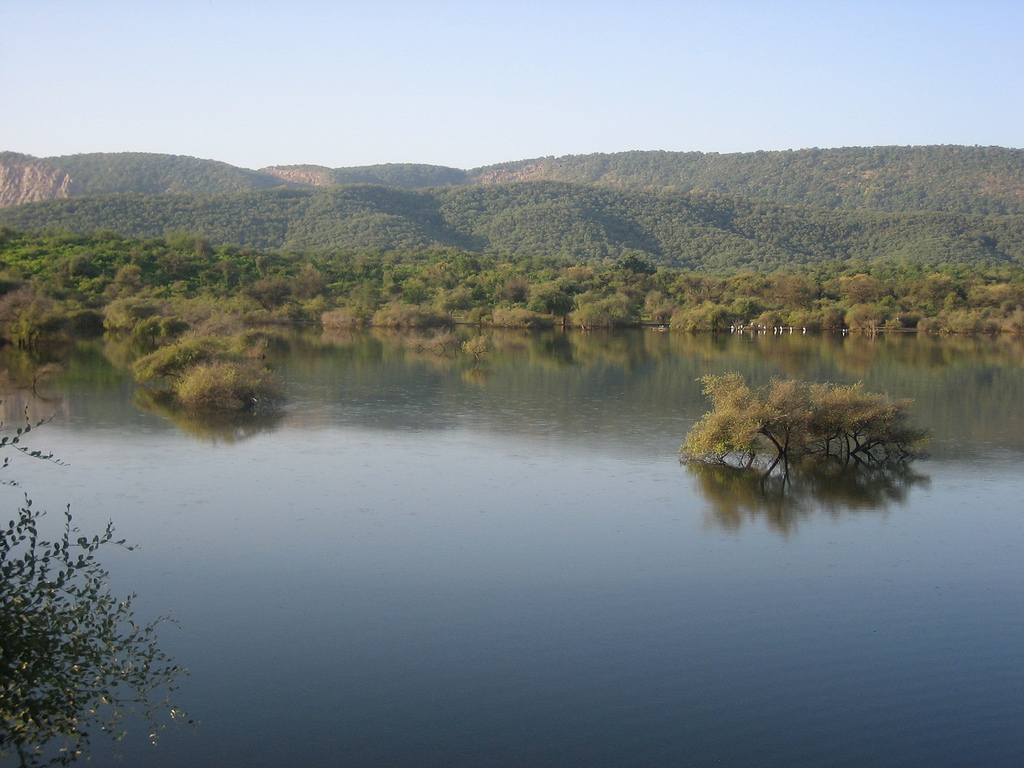
A lake nested within Aravali Hills.

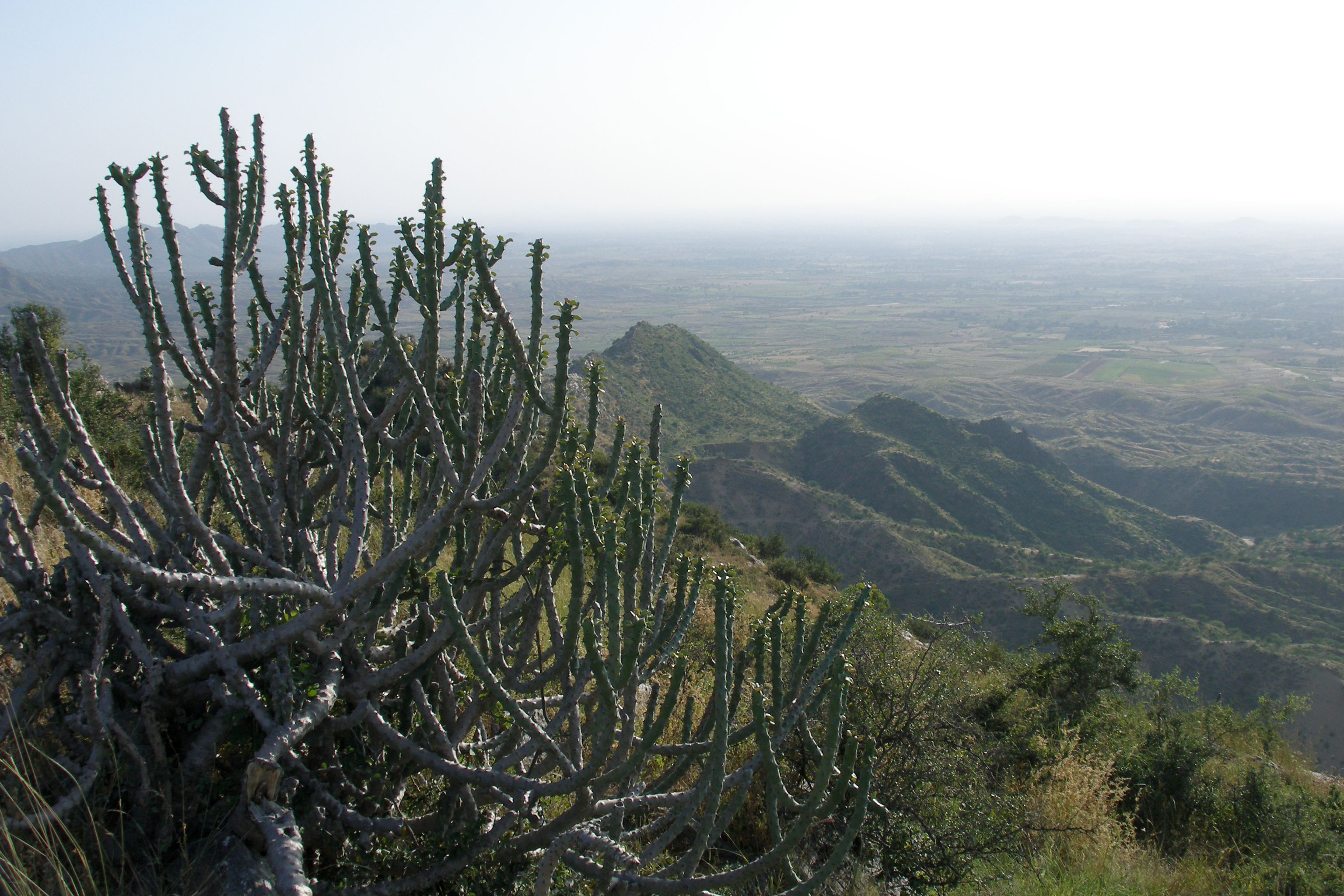
Aravali Hills near Pushkar.

=== Climate ===
The Northern Aravalli Range in Delhi and Haryana has humid subtropical climate and hot semi-arid continental climate with very hot summers and relatively cool winters. The main characteristics of climate in Hisar are dryness, temperature extremes, and low rainfall. The maximum daytime temperature during the summer varies between 40 and 46 °C (104 and 115 °F). During winter, its ranges between 1.5 and 4 °C.

The Central Aravalli Range in Rajasthan has an arid and dry climate.

The Southern Aravalli Range in Gujarat has a tropical wet and dry climate

=== Rivers ===
Three major rivers and their tributaries flow from the Aravalli, namely Banas and Sahibi rivers which are tributaries of Yamuna, as well as Luni River which flows into the Rann of Kutch.

- North-to-south flowing rivers originate from the western slopes of the Aravalli Range in Rajasthan, pass through the southeastern portion of the Thar Desert, and end into Gujarat.
  - Luni River, originates in the Pushkar valley near Ajmer, ends in the marshy lands of Rann of Kutch. It used to be one of the channel of the Saraswati River, as a result its banks have several Indus Valley Civilisation sites including Lothal.
  - Sakhi River, ends in the marshy lands of Rann of Kutch.
  - Sabarmati River, originates on the western slopes of Aravalli Range of the Udaipur district, end into the Gulf of Khambhat of the Arabian Sea.
- West to north-west flowing rivers originate from the western slopes of the Aravalli Range in Rajasthan, flow through semi-arid historical Shekhawati region and drain into southern Haryana. Several Ochre Coloured Pottery culture sites, also identified as late Harappan phase of Indus Valley Civilisation culture, have been found along the banks of these rivers.
  - Sahibi River, originates near Manoharpur in Sikar district flows through Haryana and meets its confluence with the Yamuna in Delhi where it is called Najafgarh drain, along with its following tributaries: Masani barrage, is an important wildlife area.
    - Dohan River, tributary of the Sahibi River, originates near Neem Ka Thana in Sikar district).
    - Sota River, tributary of the Sahibi River with which it merges at Behror in Alwar district.
    - Krishnavati river, former tributary of Sahibi river, originates near Dariba copper mines in Rajsamand district of Rajasthan, flows through Patan in Dausa district and Mothooka in Alwar district, then disappears in Mahendragarh district in Haryana much before reaching Sahibi River. It previously was a tributary to the Sahibi and part of its present canalised channel is called the Outfall Drain No. 8. Many important wetlands lie in its paleochannel, including Matanhail, Chhuchhakwas-Godhari, Khaparwas Wildlife Sanctuary, Bhindawas Wildlife Sanctuary, Sarbashirpur, Sultanpur National Park, Basai and The Lost Lake (Gurugram).
- West to north-east flowing rivers, originating from the eastern slopes of Aravalli Range in Rajasthan, flow northwards to Yamuna.
  - Chambal River, a southern-side tributary of Yamuna River.
    - Banas River, a northern-side tributary of Chambal River.
      - Berach River, a southern-side tributary of Banas River, originates in the hills of Udaipur district.
        - Ahar River, a right-side (or eastern side) tributary of the Berach river, originates in the hills of Udaipur district, flows through Udaipur city and into Lake Pichola.
        - Wagli River, a right-side tributary of the Berach River.
        - Wagon River, a right-side tributary of the Berach River.
        - Gambhiri River, a right-side tributary of the Berach River.
        - Orai River, a right-side tributary of the Berach River.

== Ecology ==
=== Wildlife corridors ===
==== The Great Green Wall of India ====
"The Great Green Wall of Aravalli" is a proposed 1,600 km long and 5 km wide green ecological corridor along Aravalli range from Gujarat to Delhi, it will be connected to Shivalik hill range and 1.35 billion (135 crore) new native trees will be planted over 10 years to rehabilitate the forest cover in this area. To be implemented on a concept similar to the Great Green Wall of Sahara in Africa, it will act as a buffer against pollution, 51% of which is caused by the industrial pollution, 27% by vehicles, 8% by crop burning and 5% by diwali fireworks. It was proposed several times from the 1990s, but as of 2024 the project is still in the planning stage. On the World Environment Day 5 June 2025, Prime Minister Modi kickstarted the phase-I of re-greening of this green wall as extension of the "Ek Ped Maa Ke Naam" (one tree [by each person], in the name of Mother [Nature]" campaign which will last till 2027, entailing setting up 1000 permanent nurseries of the native plants for the ongoing regreening of Aravalli by replacing the foreign species. The effort also entails development of the trails, eco parks, wildlife safaris, and people's involvement in 29 districts across 3 states and one Union Territory. and 700 km mountain range.

The 10,000-acre Gurgram Safari Park is being developed under the Aravalli Green Wall Project to reforest and restore the mountain range.

==== Northern Aravalli leopard and wildlife corridor ====
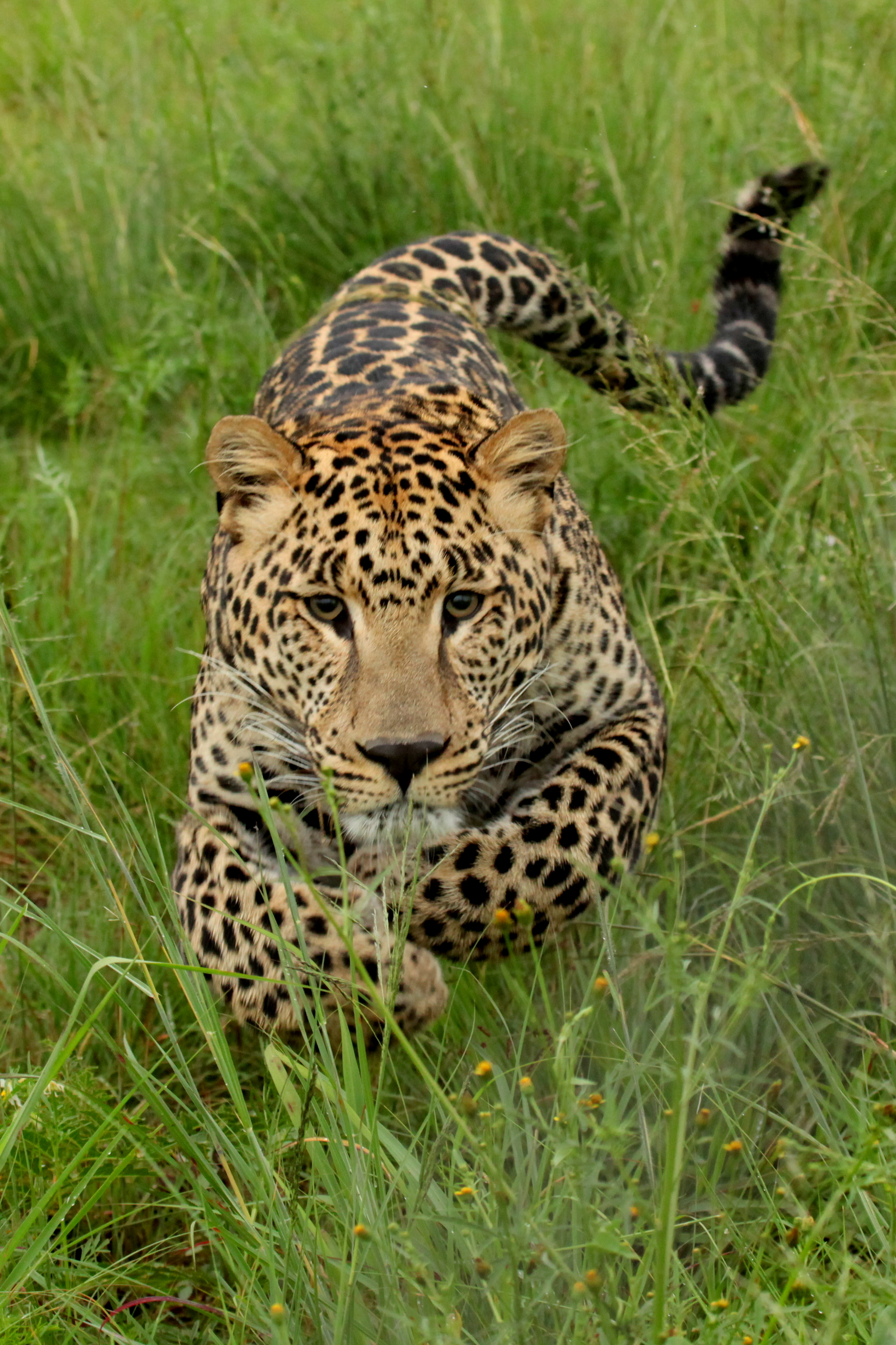
Indian leopard.

The Sariska–Delhi leopard wildlife corridor or the Northern Aravalli leopard wildlife corridor is a 200 km long important biodiversity and wildlife corridor which runs from the Sariska Tiger Reserve in Rajasthan to Delhi Ridge.

This corridor is an important habitat for the Indian leopards and jackals of Aravalli. In January 2019, the Wildlife Institute of India announced that they will undertake the survey of leopard and wildlife, using pugmarks and trap cameras, subsequently, leopards and jackals will be tracked via the radio collars. Urban development, especially the highways and railways bisecting the Aravalli Range and wildlife corridor in several places pose a great risk. Large parts of Aravalli are legally and physically unprotected, with no wildlife passages and little or no wildlife conservation work resulting in deaths of over 10 leopards in 4 years between January 2015 to January 2019.

The Haryana side of the Gurugram-Faridabad Aravalli hill forests lack availability of water due to which wild animals are seldom seen there. The Government of Haryana used drones for aerial surveys and dug 22 ephemeral pits in 2018 to store the rainwater which became dry during the summer months. In January 2019, the government announced the plan to make the pit perennial by connecting those with pipelines from the nearby villages.

Human activity, such as unplanned urbanization and polluting industrial plants, also pose a great threat. There is often reluctance and denial on part of the government officials of the presence of wildlife such as leopard so that the forest land can be exploited and opened up for the intrusive human development.

This habitat is under serious threat from the wrong actions of the Government of Haryana which in 2019 passed the amendment to the Punjab Land Alienation Act, 1900 (PLPA). Governor has given his assent for the act, but it has not yet been notified by the Haryana government, hence it is in limbo and has not officially become a law. This amendment will reduce the Haryana's Natural Conservation Zones (NCZs) by 47% or 60,000 acres from 122,113.30 hectares to only 64,384.66 hectares. This is in violation of multiple guidelines of the Supreme Court of India as well as "NCR Planning Board" (NCRPB) notification which states the original 122,113.30 hectares ecologically sensitive forest of South Haryana is a forest, "The major natural features, identified as environmentally sensitive areas, are the extension of Aravalli ridge in Rajasthan, Haryana and NCT-Delhi; forest areas; rivers and tributaries... major lakes and water bodies such as Badkhal lake, Suraj Kund and Damdama in Haryana sub-region". This area as part of Northern Aravalli leopard and wildlife corridor is an important habitat for the leopards in Haryana.

==== Southern Aravalli leopard wildlife corridor ====
This corridor runs from Sariska and Ranthmbor to Rann of Kutch National Park and Gir National Park in Gujarat.

=== Nature reserves ===
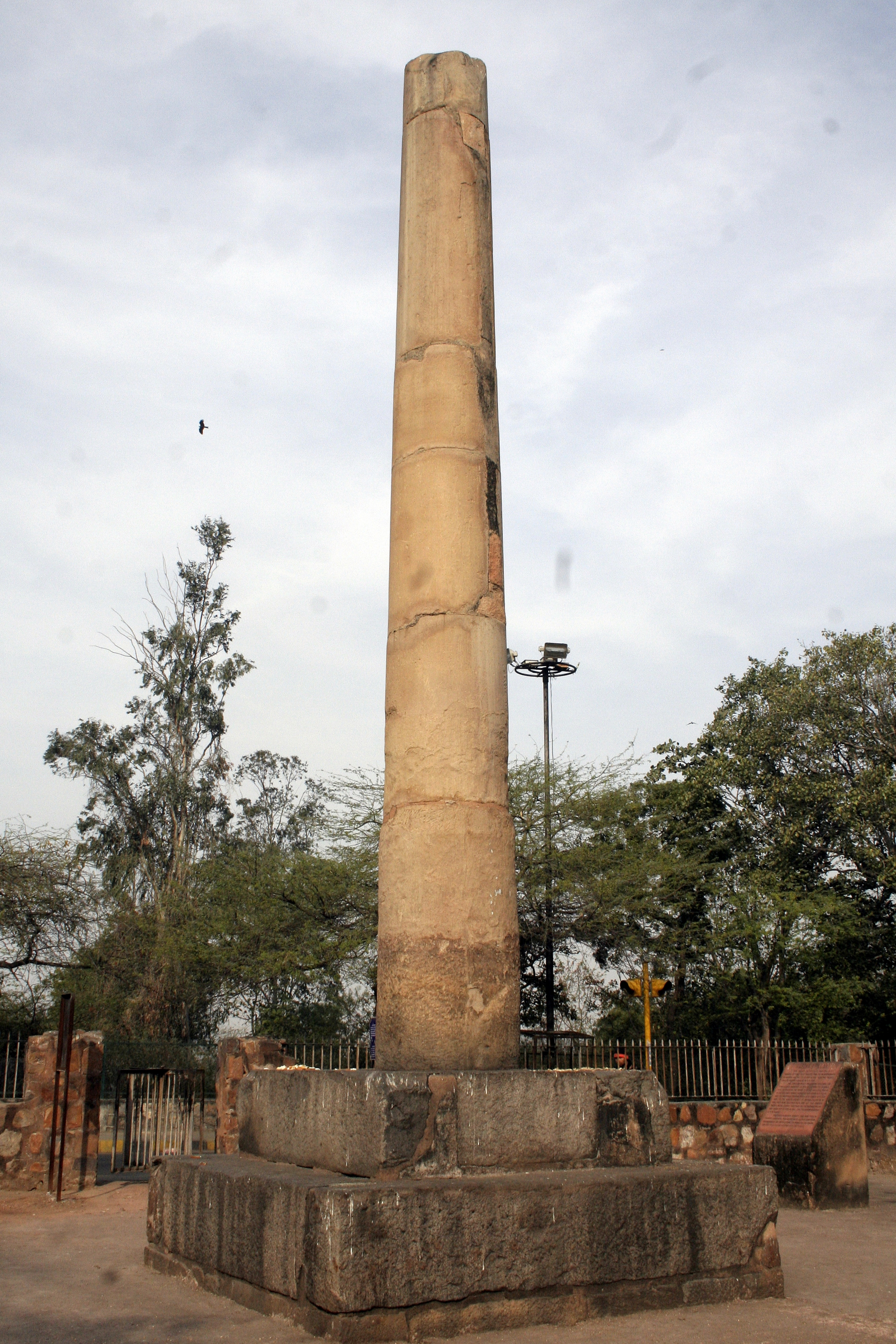
Ashoka pillar at Delhi Ridge, brought to Delhi from Topra Kalan by Firoz Shah Tughlaq in 1356

The following national parks, wildlife reserves, and forests lie in the Aravalli Range.

- Delhi Ridge
  - Northern Ridge biodiversity park, 87 hectares approximately near Delhi University
  - Yamuna biodiversity park
  - Neela Hauz biodiversity park, next to Sanjay Van
  - Sanjay Van
  - Sanjay Lake
  - Aravalli Biodiversity Park
  - Tilpath valley biodiversity park, 70 hectares approximately near Sainik Farm
  - Asola Bhatti Wildlife Sanctuary
- Haryana
  - Aravali Biodiversity Park, Gurgaon
  - Madhogarh Biodiversity Park forest
  - Nuh Aravalli Biodiversity Park forest
  - Satnali Biodiversity Park forest
  - Tosham Hill range biodiversity park
  - Masani barrage wildlife area.
  - Matanhail wildlife area
  - Chhuchhakwas-Godhari wetland
  - Khaparwas Wildlife Sanctuary
  - Bhindawas Wildlife Sanctuary
  - Sarbashirpur
  - Sultanpur National Park
  - Basai
  - Bandhwari forest
  - Mangar Bani forest
  - The Lost Lake (Gurugram)
- Rajasthan
  - Sariska Tiger Reserve
  - Ranthambore National Park
  - National Chambal Sanctuary
  - Phulwari Ki Nal Wildlife Sanctuary
  - Sita Mata Wildlife Sanctuary
  - Todgarh-Raoli Sanctuary
  - Mount Abu Wildlife Sanctuary
  - Kumbhalgarh Wildlife Sanctuary
  - Bassi Wildlife Sanctuary
  - Jaisamand Wildlife Sanctuary
- Gujarat
  - Balaram Ambaji Wildlife Sanctuary
  - Jambughoda Wildlife Sanctuary
  - Jessore Sloth Bear Sanctuary

=== Flora ===
The Aravalli Range has several forests with a diversity of environment. The Aravalli Range is characterized by dry deciduous forests. They are dominated by plant species such as dhok, acacia, and neem. These forests also support a variety of flowering plants, including roses, bougainvillea, and hibiscus. The Great Green Wall of India, the Northern Aravalli Leopard and Wildlife Corridor, and the Southern Aravalli Leopard Wildlife Corridor are some of the Wildlife Corridors in this Range.

=== Fauna ===
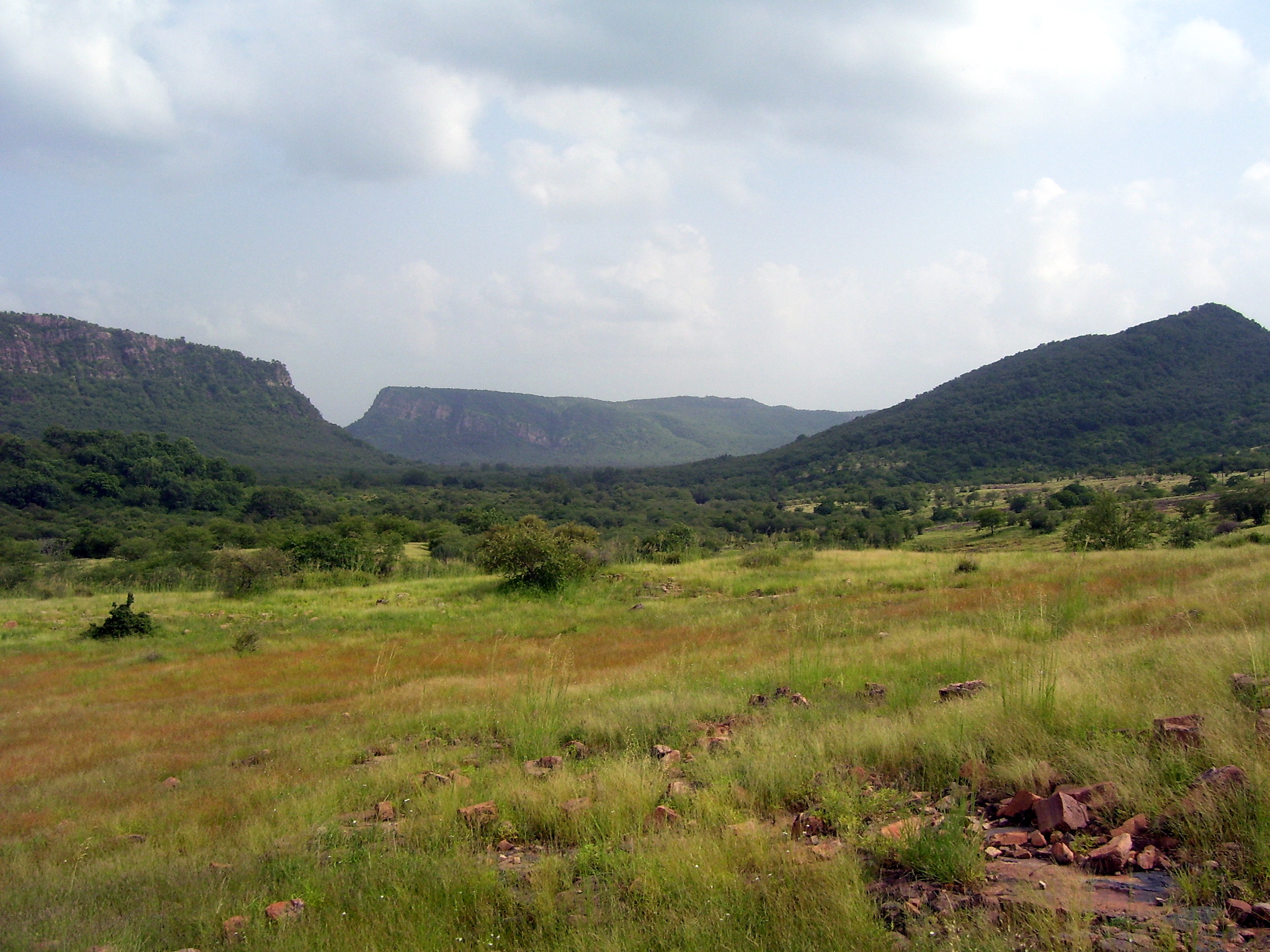
Ranthambore National Park, in Rajasthan

The Aravalli Range is rich in wildlife. The first-ever 2017 wildlife survey of a 200 square kilometre area crossing five districts (Gurgaon, Faridabad, Mewat, Rewari and Mahendergarh) of Haryana by the Wildlife Institute of India (WII) found 14 species, including leopards, striped hyena (7 sightings), golden jackal (9 sightings, with 92% occupancy across the survey area), nilgai (55 sightings), palm civet (7 sightings), wild pig (14 sightings), rhesus macaque (55 sightings), peafowl (57 sightings) and Indian crested porcupine (12 sightings). Encouraged by the first survey, the wildlife department has prepared a plan for a comprehensive study and census of wildlife across the whole Aravalli Range, including radio collar tracking of the wild animals. Well known leopard and hyena habitat is along the Ferozpure Jhirka-Nuh Aravali range as well as Delhi South Ridge (Faridabad-Gurugram) to Farrukhnagar area on the Delhi–Haryana border, with reports of sightings in Saidpur, Lokri and Jhund Sarai Viran villages near the KMP expressway; Bhukarka 7 km from Pataudi; Pathkori, Bhond, Mandawar in Ferozepur Jirka region.

== Concerns ==
In May 1992, some parts of the Aravalli hills in Rajasthan and Haryana were protected from mining through the Ecologically Sensitive Areas clauses of Indian laws. In 2003, the central government of India prohibited mining operations in these areas. In 2004, India's Supreme Court banned mining in the notified areas of Aravalli Range. In May 2009, the Supreme Court extended the ban on mining in an area of 448 km^{2} across the Faridabad, Gurgaon and Mewat districts in Haryana, covering the Aravalli Range. Between 2018-25, 40,175 instances of illegal mining, both major and minor have been reported in the Aravalli districts and 4,181 FIRs have been filed. Hills have been completely vanished due to mining like the Bakrija hill in Haryana which was completely flattened in 2024.

A 2013 report used high-resolution Cartosat-1 and LISS-IV satellite imaging to determine the existence and condition of mines in the Aravalli Range. In the Guru Gram district, the Aravalli hills occupy an area of 11,256 hectares, of which 491 (4.36%) hectares had mines, of which 16 hectares (0.14%) were abandoned flooded mines. In the Faridabad and Mewat districts, about 3610 hectares were part of mining industry, out of a total of 49,300 hectares. These mines were primarily granite and marble quarries for India's residential and real estate construction applications. In the Central Rajasthan region, Sharma states that the presence of some mining has had both positive and negative effects on neighboring agriculture and the ecosystem. The rain-induced erosion brings nutrients as well as potential contaminants.

Damage to the environment and ecology from the unorganized urbanization, overexploitation of the natural resources including water and minerals, mining, untreated human waste and disposal, pollution, loss of forest cover and wildlife habitat, unprotected status of most of the Aravalli and the lack of an integrated Aravalli management agency are the major causes of concern.

== Gallery ==
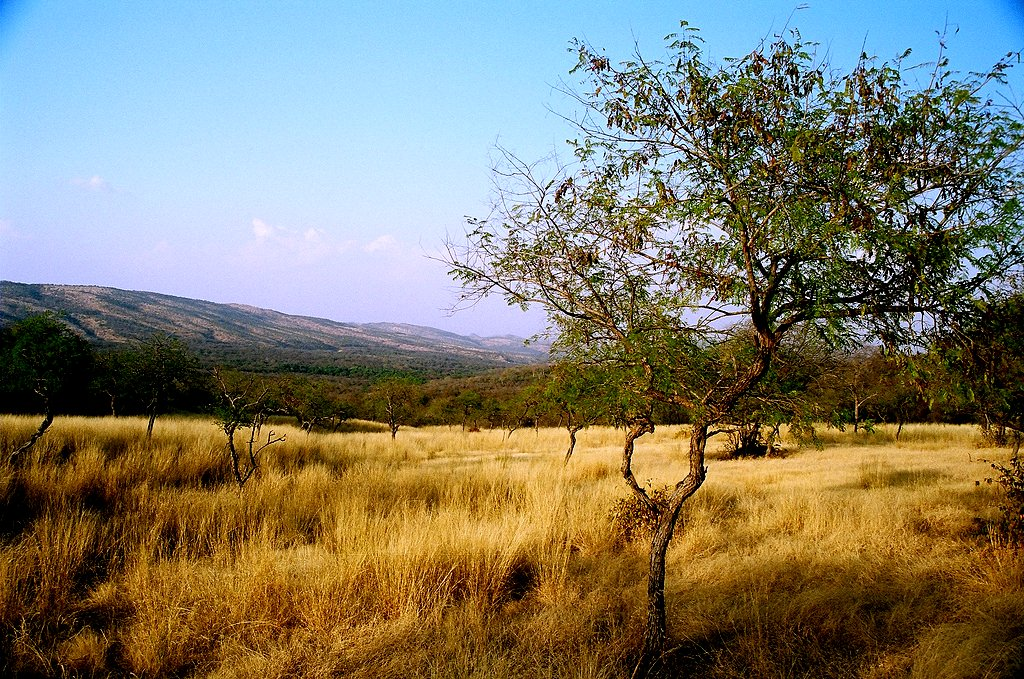
The Aravali Range inside Ranthambore National Park, in Rajasthan.

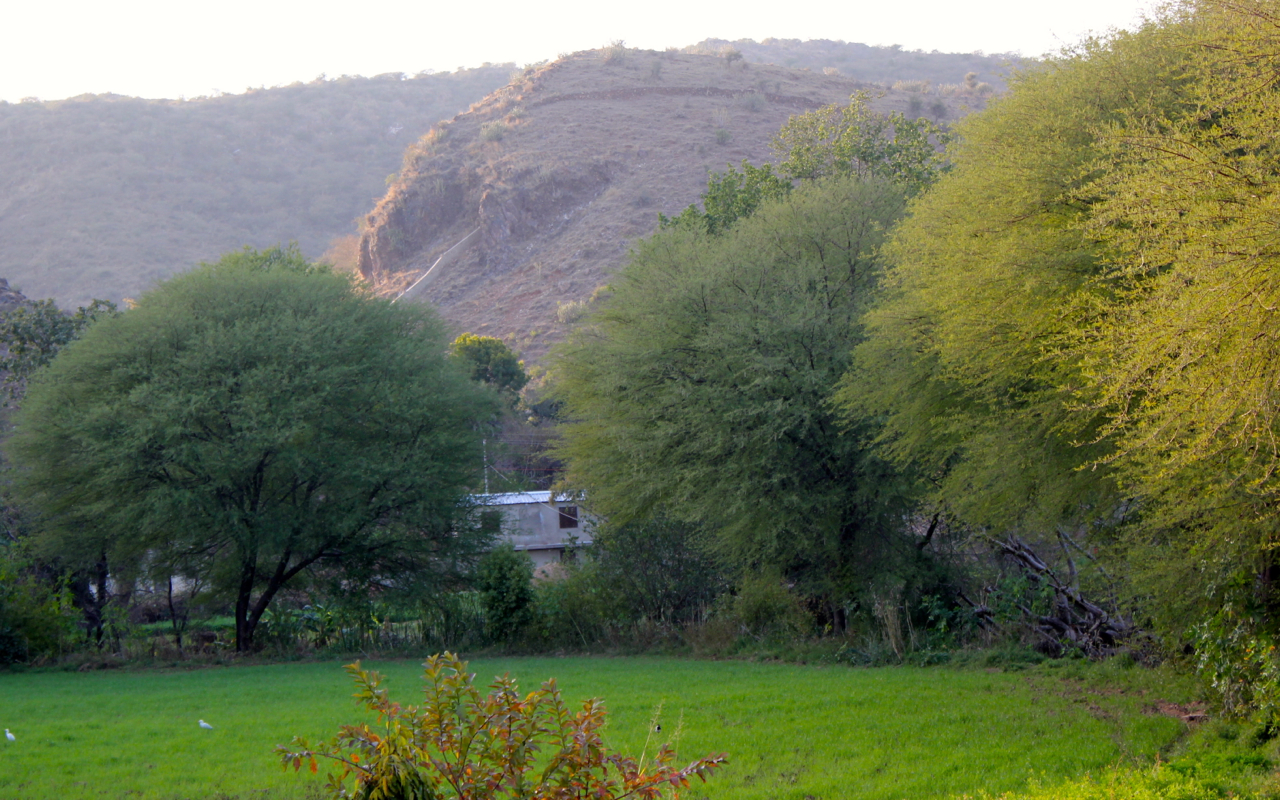
Aravalli Range near Udaipur Rajasthan

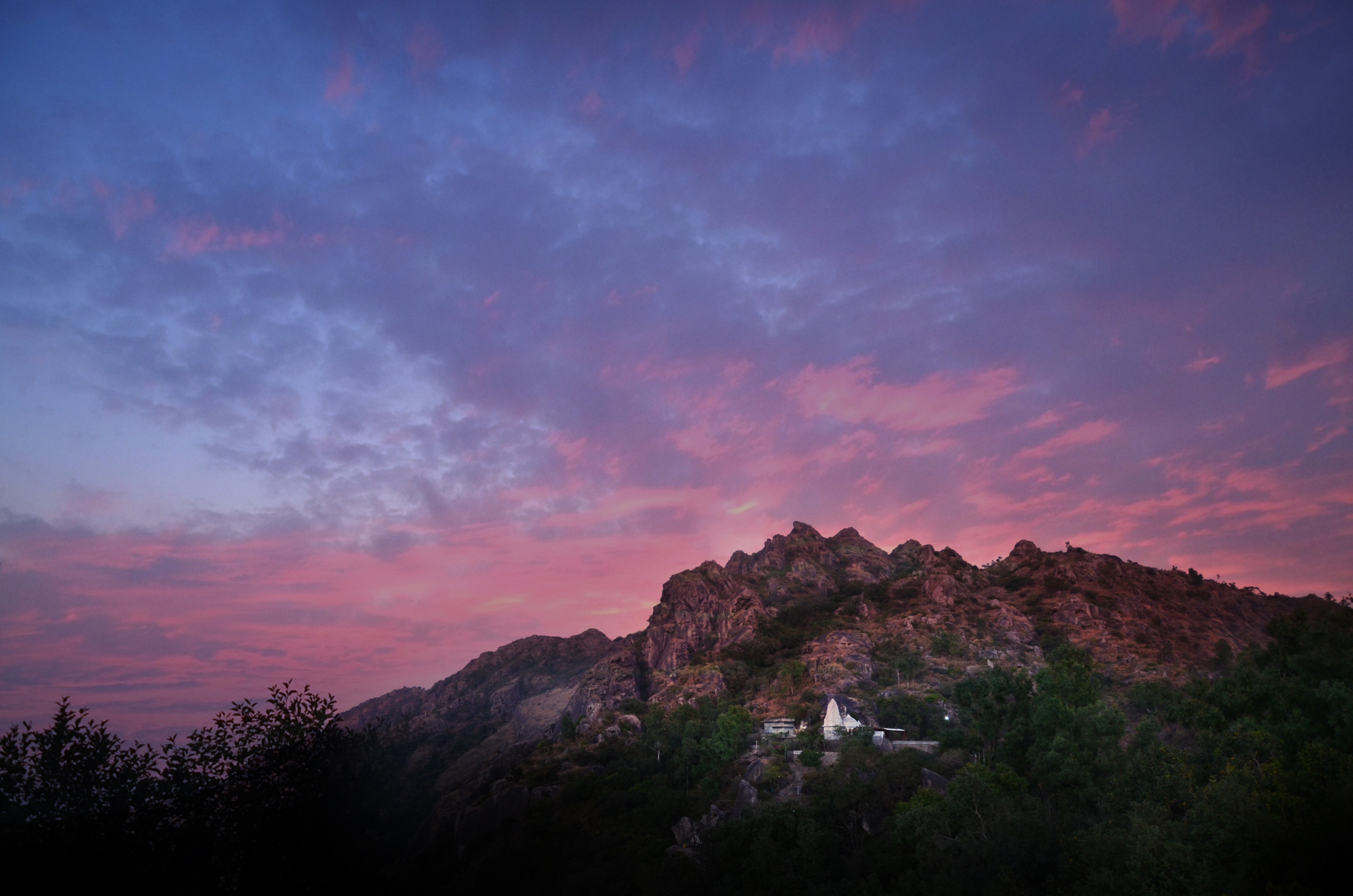
Sunset from the sunset point of Mount Abu

== See also ==
- Asola Bhatti Wildlife Sanctuary – Wildlife sanctuary near Delhi, India, Delhi
- Aravali Biodiversity Park – Biodiversity Park at Gurgaon
- Arid Forest Research Institute – Indian forest research institute
- Hill Forts of Rajasthan – UNESCO World Heritage Site in northern India
- Pinangwan
