= Alan Vince =

British archaeologist

- Born: 30 March 1952
- Died: 23 February 2009 (aged 56)

Academic background
- Education: University of Southampton

Academic work
- Discipline: Archaeologist
- Sub-discipline: Pottery; ceramic petrology; Anglo-Saxon period; Medieval ceramics; post-medieval

Alan George Vince (30 March 1952 – 23 February 2009) was a British archaeologist who studied Saxon, medieval and early modern ceramics through the application of petrological, geological and archaeological techniques. He was also a teacher and a pioneer in the use of computers and the internet in archaeology.

== Academic work ==
Vince was born in Bath and moved to Keynsham in the early 1950s, where he attended Keynsham Grammar School. He went on to study archaeology at Southampton University, where he was influenced by Professor David Peacock, who was almost entirely responsible for the introduction of ceramic petrology techniques to the study of ceramics from the British Isles.

Vince's PhD thesis, The Medieval Ceramic Industry of the Severn Valley, made heavy use of artefacts characterised by petrological analysis, and served as justification for the use of this technique to assist with classification of pottery samples.

In 1984, Vince and Martin Biddle of the Museum of London, working independently, identified an area to the West of the Roman walled city as the likely location of the middle Anglo-Saxon settlement in London.

From 1995, Vince was the managing editor of a new online journal, Internet Archaeology. Based in the University of York, he worked as managing editor until 1999, by which time he had overseen the journal through its formative issues and set the standard for what was to follow.

In 1999, Vince stopped working at the University of York to concentrate on his archaeological consultancy, based in Lincoln. As well as his continuing work in the field of ceramic petrology, Vince contributed to many publications, in particular those focusing on the local area, such as The City by the Pool: Assessing the Archaeology of the City of Lincoln (2003).

Vince appeared twice on TV as a pottery expert on the Channel 4 programme, Time Team: in series 7, episode 10 (Sutton, Hereford) and series 10, episode 11 (Not a Blot on the Landscape, Castle Howard, Yorkshire).

== Personal life ==
Vince met his wife, Joanna, on a dig in Coddenham, Suffolk, in 1973. They were married in 1976 and had three children - Leon, Amy and Kate.

He died of cancer on 23 February 2009.

== Books ==
- Vince, Alan (1990). Saxon London. Seaby. ISBN 1-85264-019-7.
- Orton, Clive; Tyers, Paul; Vince, Alan (1993). Pottery in Archaeology. Cambridge University Press. ISBN 0-521-25715-8.
- Schofield, John; Vince, Alan (1994). Medieval Towns. Fairleigh Dickinson University Press. ISBN 0-8386-3622-5.
- Jones, Michael J; Stocker, David; Vince, Alan (2003). The City by the Pool. Oxbow Books. ISBN 1-84217-107-0.
