= Internet Archaeology =

Academic journal

- Discipline: Archaeology
- Language: English
- Edited by: Judith Winters

Publication details
- History: 1995–present
- Publisher: Council for British Archaeology (United Kingdom)
- Open access: Yes
- License: CC BY 3.0

Standard abbreviations
- ISO 4: Internet Archaeol.

Indexing
- ISSN: 1363-5387
- OCLC no.: 36744088

Links
- Journal homepage

Internet Archaeology is an academic journal and one of the first fully peer-reviewed electronic journals covering archaeology. It was established in 1995. The journal was part of the eLIb project's electronic journals. The journal is produced and hosted at the Department of Archaeology at the University of York and published by the Council for British Archaeology. The journal has won several awards for its creative exemplars of linked e-publications and archives.

The journal's first editor-in-chief (1996–1999) was Alan Vince. Since 1999 it has been edited by Judith Winters.

Journal content makes use of the potential of internet publication to present archaeological research (excavation reports, methodology, analyses, applications of information technology) in ways that could not be achieved in print, such as searchable data sets, visualisations/virtual reality models, and interactive mapping. The journal's content is archived by the Archaeology Data Service.

== History ==
Original logo from 1996

The journal was established in 1995 with funding from the Jisc's Electronic Libraries programme. It published its first issue in 1996 and was initially open access with tapering funding from the eLib programme. Institutional site licences were launched in 2000, and incrementally moved to a subscription only model by 2002. but in September 2014, editor Winters announced that the publication had adopted an open access approach and that all past and future content would be freely available.

== Abstracting and indexing ==
The journal is abstracted and indexed in:

- Archaeology Data Service Library
- ERIH PLUS
- International Bibliography of the Social Sciences
- Scopus

== Editors ==
The following persons are or have been editor-in-chief:

- Alan Vince (1996–1999)
- Judith Winters (1999–present)
