= Anna O. Shepard =

American Archaeologist

Anna Osler Shepard (1903–1971) was an American archaeologist whose work was foundational to the study of ancient ceramics in the American Southwest and Mesoamerica.

== Biography ==
Anna O. Shepard

Shepard received her bachelor's degree from the University of Nebraska in 1926. She conducted postgraduate work in optical crystallography at Claremont College in 1930 and later studied chemical spectroscopy in 1937 at New York University. In 1940, she studied at the Massachusetts Institute of Technology and received her PhD in chemistry from the University of Colorado in 1942.

She pioneered the study of ceramic petrography in the United States, determining the provenance of painted vessels from sites throughout the Southwest. She demonstrated that Ancestral Puebloans, specifically women, produced pottery on a large scale for trade throughout the region. She also analyzed Maya blue pigments, as well as glazed plumbate pottery from the Postclassic period in Mexico.

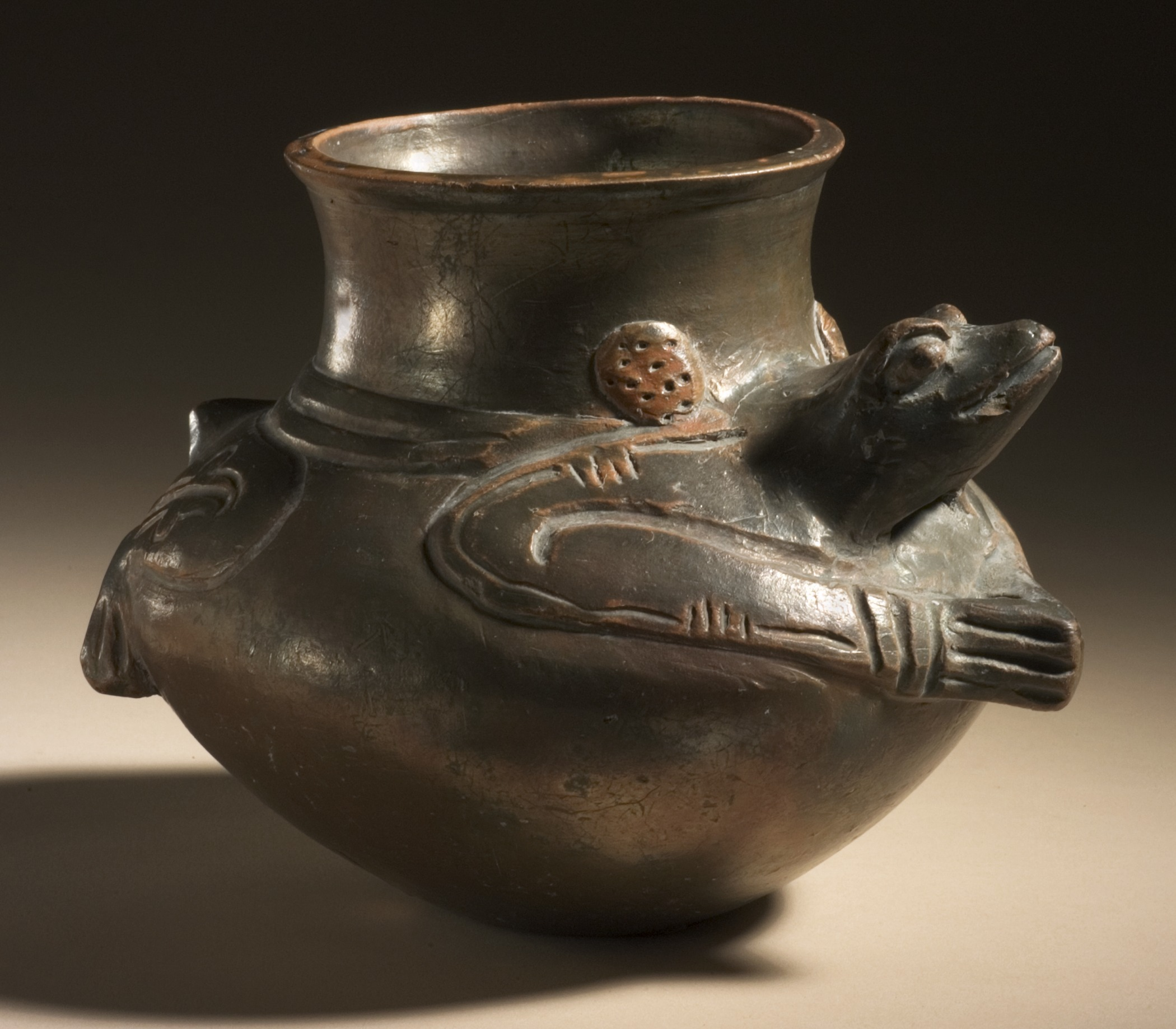
Maya frog vessel with plumbate glaze. From Guatemala, Coastal Piedmont, 900-1200 AD.

Her book, Ceramics for the Archaeologist, published in 1956, still serves as a comprehensive reference for archaeologists today.

Shepard's papers and ceramic collections are held in the Anthropology Section at the University of Colorado Museum.

== Publications ==
- Shepard, Anna O. (1931). The Technology of Pecos Pottery, by Anna O. Shepard. (Part Two of The Pottery of Pecos, Volume II, A. V. Kidder and Anna O. Shepard), Yale University Press, New Haven, Connecicut.
- Shepard, Anna O. (1948). Plumbate, a Mesoamerican Trade Ware. No. 573, Carnegie Institution of Washington, Washington, D.C.
- Shepard, Anna O. (1956). Ceramics for the Archaeologist. No. 609, Carnegie Institution of Washington, Washington, D.C.

== Bibliography ==
- Bishop, Ronald L. and Frederick W. Lange, editors (1991). The Ceramic Legacy of Anna O. Shepard. University Press of Colorado, Boulder.
- Morris, Elizabeth Ann (1974). Anna O. Shepard 1903–1971. American Antiquity 39:448-451.
