= Bassi Wildlife Sanctuary =

Wildlife sanctuary in Rajasthan, India

- IUCN category IV (habitat/species management area)
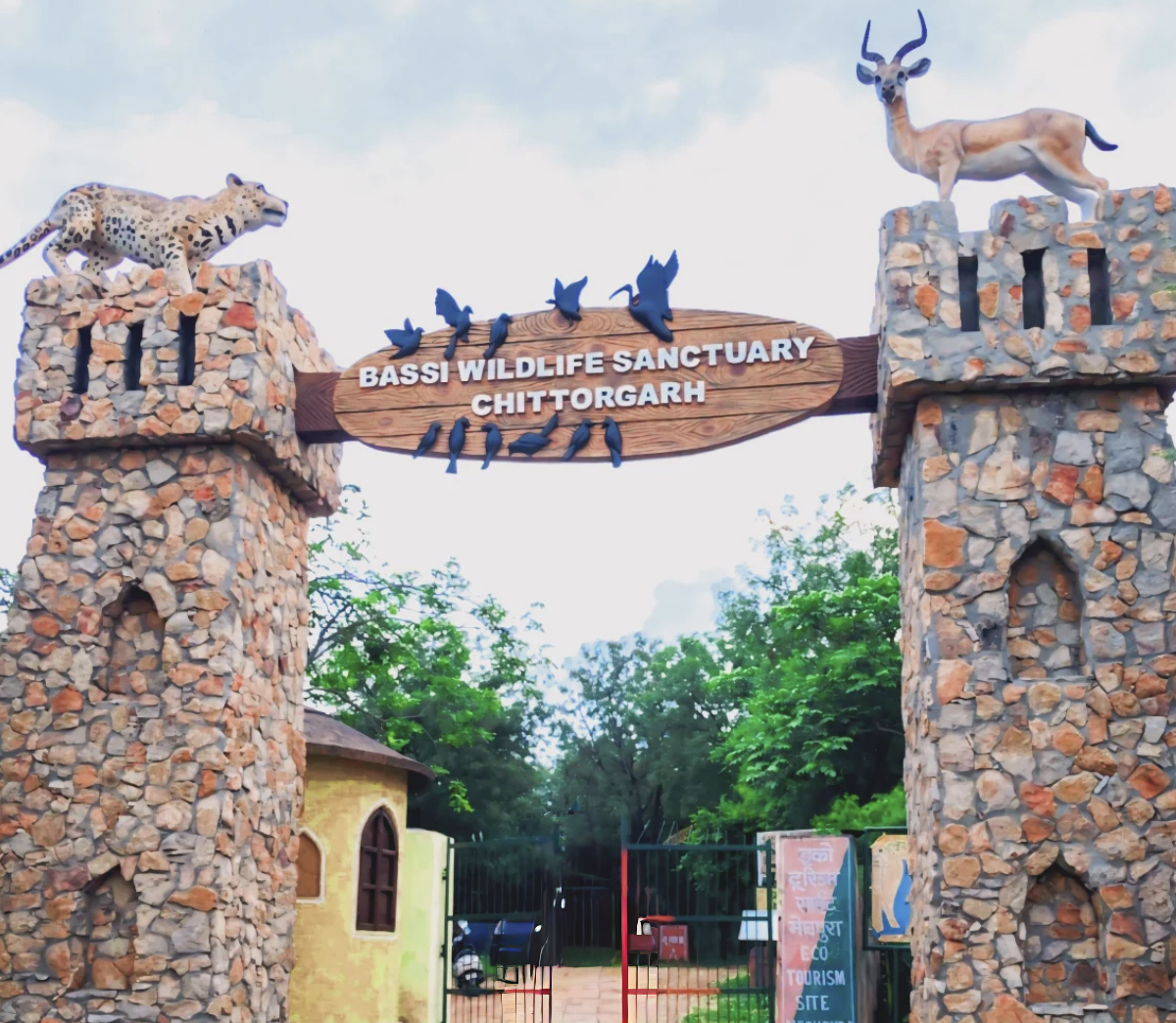

- Location within Rajasthan Location within India
- Interactive map of Bassi Wildlife Sanctuary
- Location: Chittorgarh district, Rajasthan, India
- Nearest city: Bassi
- Coordinates: 25°1′30″N 74°51′29.99″E
- Area: 288 km^{2} (111 sq mi)
- Established: 1988

Bassi Wildlife Sanctuary is a wildlife sanctuary near Bassi in Chittorgarh district of Rajasthan, India, 5 kilometres from the Bassi Fort Palace. It covers 15,290 hectares and was established in 1988. The sanctuary is located on the western border of the Vindhyachal Ranges and includes the Orai and Bassi dam as part of the sanctuary. Antelope, wild boar, panther, mongoose and migratory birds inhabit the sanctuary.

Animals found at the Bassi Wildlife Sanctuary:

- Jackal
- Crocodile
- Crane
- Wild cat
- Civet
- Chinkara
- Panther
- Spotted deer (chital)
- Peacock
- Porcupine
- Hyena
- Langur
- Fox
- Blue bull
- Wild boar
- Eagle
- Hare
- Ghoda wild horse

Bassi Wildlife Sanctuary is also attractive to many migratory birds.

The forest is mostly dry and deciduous, the trees that are most represented are dhok, churel and butea. There are also medicinal herbs and flowers.

== See also ==
- Arid Forest Research Institute (AFRI)
