= Palm civet =

Palm civet is the common name of several species of feliform carnivorans in two families.

- Family Nandiniidae:
  - African palm civet (Nandinia binotata)
- Family Viverridae:
  - Small-toothed palm civet (Arctogalidia trivirgata)
  - Owston's palm civet (Chrotogale owstoni)
  - Hose's palm civet (Diplogale hosei)
  - Banded palm civet (Hemigalus derbyanus)
  - Sulawesi palm civet (Macrogalidia musschenbroekii)
  - Masked palm civet (Paguma larvata)
  - Asian palm civet (Paradoxurus hermaphroditus)
  - Brown palm civet (Paradoxurus jerdoni)
  - Golden palm civet (Paradoxurus zeylonensis)
