= Jodhpur Group – Malani Igneous Suite Contact =

Jodhpur Group-Malani Igneous Suite Contact
- Geological feature
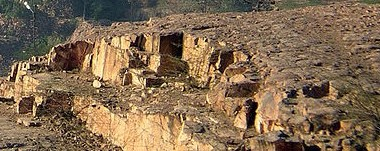
- Malani Igneous Suite Contact below Mehrangarh Fort in Jodhpur

- Location within Rajasthan
- Coordinates: 26.28°N 73.02°E
- Location: Jodhpur district, Rajasthan, India

National Geological Monuments of India
- Official name: Jodhpur Group-Malani Igneous Suite Contact
- Designated: 1976
- Designated by: Geological Survey of India

Jodhpur Group-Malani Igneous Suite Contact of the Aravalli Range is a geological feature representing the last phase of igneous activity of the Precambrian age in the Indian subcontinent at the foot of the Mehrangarh Fort in Jodhpur district. The Geological Survey of India declared the site as a National Geological Monument in 1976.

== Geography ==
The Malani Igneous Suite covers about 44,500 km^{2} (17,200 sq mi) to the west of the Aravalli Range, extending across Western Rajasthan. At Jodhpur, it is exposed in contact with the sandstone of the Jodhpur Group at the foot of Mehrangarh Fort. The site was declared as a National Geological Monument by the Geological Survey of India in 1976.

== Geology ==
The lithological formations of Rajasthan consist of sedimentary rocks of the Vindhyan or Marwar Supergroups, comprising sandstone, limestone and shale, in the eastern part of the state. In western Rajasthan, the geological formations include igneous rocks such as granite bosses and sills, formed from thick accumulations of acidic lava produced by volcanic activity that preceded the deposition of the overlying sedimentary rocks.

The Malani Igenous Suite is composed mainly of rhyolite. The Mehrangarh Fort stands on a rhyolite rock exposure forming a hillock about 120 m (390 ft) high. The Trans-Aravalli region has a geological setting distinct from the rest of Rajasthan. At Jodhpur, the Malani Igneous Suite is overlain by a thick sequence of undeformed sedimentary rocks of the Vindhyan and Marwar Supergroups, deposited during the late Proterozoic and early Cambrian, around 540 million years ago.

At the Mehrangarh hill, the contact between the volcanic rocks below and the overlying sedimentary rocks is clearly exposed. This unconformity is important for understanding the age and relationship between the two rock groups as it represents the last major phase of Precambrian igneous activity in the Indian subcontinent. The Malani rocks at the site include purple, red and ash-coloured laminated tuffs, chocolate-coloured chalcedony, dark-red obsidian, and purple, reddish, buff, whitish and grey rhyolitic tuffs associated with ignimbrites. The colourful volcanic rocks contrast sharply with the light-coloured Jodhpur sandstone above them.
