= Chiastolite =

Mineral

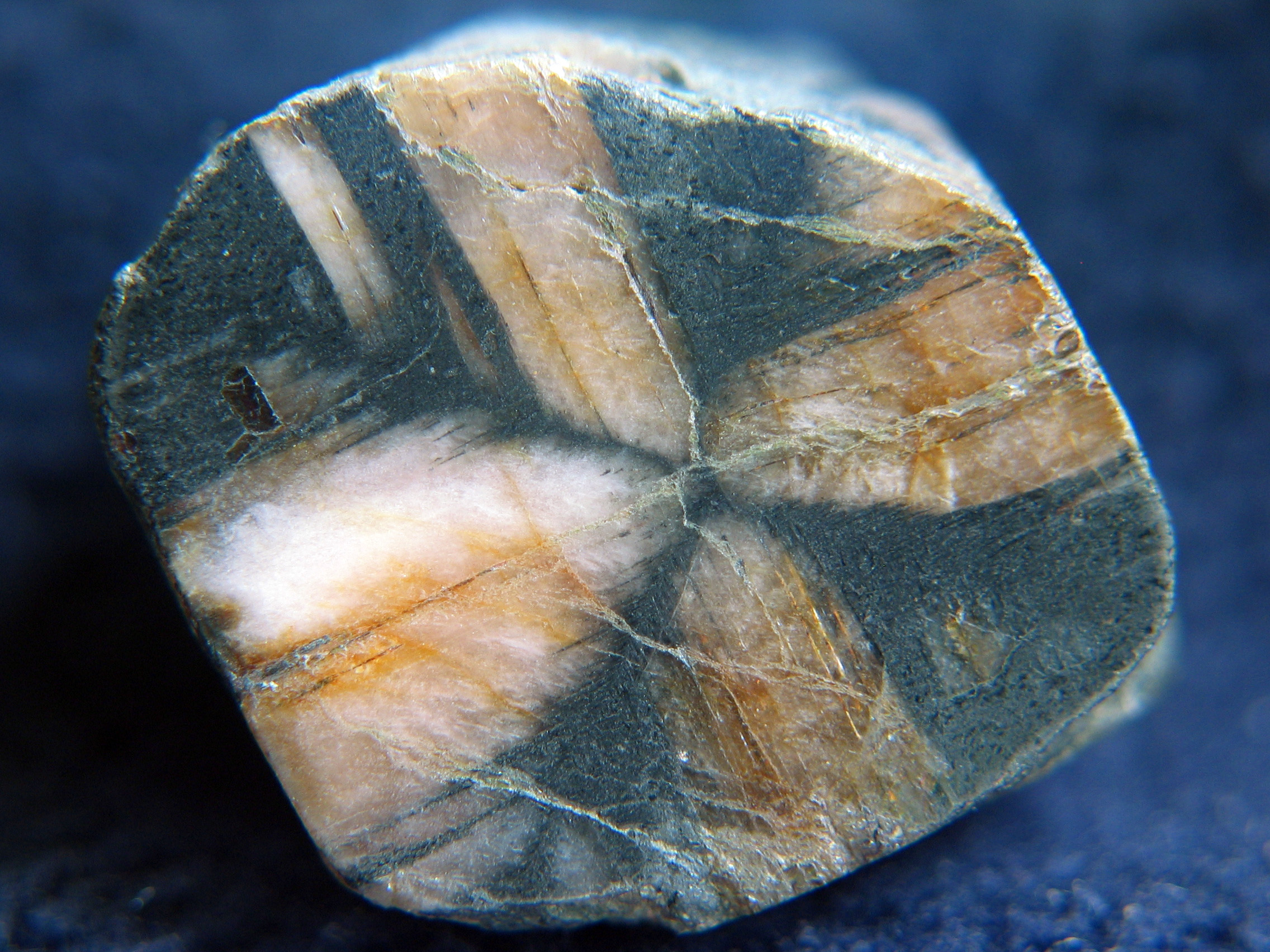
- Specimen from Santiago de Compostela, Spain

General
- Category: Minerals
- Formula: Al_{2}SiO_{5}

Identification

Chiastolite (/kaɪˈæstəˌlaɪt/ ky-ASS-tə-lyte) is a variety of the mineral andalusite with the chemical composition Al_{2}SiO_{5}. It is noted for its distinctive cross-shaped black inclusions of graphite. The presence of these crosses caused the mineral to be used as a gem. Chiastolite specimens were distributed throughout Europe from the 16th century, as an amulet or souvenir provided by the pilgrims returning from Santiago de Compostela (Saint James of Compostella), in Spain. When chiastolite appears in the old books of mineralogy, it is cited with the name of lapis crucifer or lapis cruciatur, cross stone. Chiastolite is named for the Greek word chiastos, meaning cross. The first figure of a chiastolite appears in Laet's book De Gemmis et Lapidibus, published in 1648. The chiastolite specimens sold to the pilgrims came from Asturias, where it is very abundant, in large specimens, in the area of Boal.

In areas around Georgetown, California, US, metamorphosed sediments contained andalusite and chiastolite in a graphite-rich metasediment. The chiastolite crystals have been pseudomorphically altered by a mixture of muscovite, paragonite and margarite. The calcium-rich margarite tends to form along the graphite-rich crosses or bands within the chiastolite. Mineralogically the occurrence is important because all three white mica phases are present in an equilibrium assemblage.

There are several theories regarding the formation of the chiastolite cross, however the most widely accepted theory, proposed by Frondel in 1934, suggests that there is a selective attachment of impurities at the rapidly growing corners of andalusite crystals. As the concentration of these impurities (which consist primarily of graphite) increases, the growth of the crystal is slowed. This concentrated impurity deposit forms a re-entrant as it is absorbed by the growth of the andalusite porphyroblast. The cycle of growth-retardation-growth then repeats itself, creating a featherlike pattern of graphite along four radiating "arms".
