= Ceramic petrography =

Ceramic petrography (or ceramic petrology) is a laboratory-based scientific archaeological technique that examines the mineralogical and microstructural composition of ceramics and other inorganic materials under the polarised light microscope in order to interpret aspects of the provenance and technology of artefacts.

The process of ceramic petrography involves careful sample preparation. Small sections of the ceramic material are carefully ground down to a thickness of approximately 0.03 mm and then mounted on glass slides. These thin sections allow for the examination of the internal structure of the ceramics and facilitate the identification of mineral phases, crystalline structures, and textural features. The methodology of ceramic petrography draws upon principles from various fields, including optical mineralogy, thin section petrography, and soil micromorphology

== Methods ==
While there are multiple scientific methods that can be adopted to help scientists ascertain the elemental composition of the ceramics, below are the four most common methods:

=== LA-ICP-MS (Laser Ablation – Inductively Coupled Plasma – Mass Spectrometry) ===
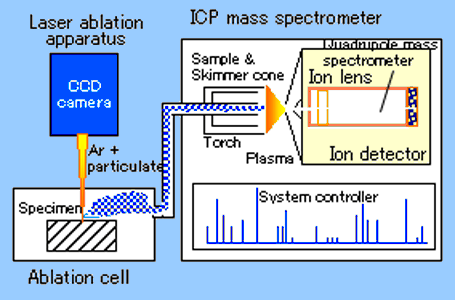
Depiction of how LA-ICP-MS works

One of the increasingly used methods includes the use of LA-ICP-MS. In LA-ICP-MS, a laser beam is focused on a sample surface, causing it to vaporize and form a high-temperature plasma. This plasma is then introduced into an inductively coupled plasma (ICP) source, where further ionization and excitation occur. The resulting ions are then analysed using a mass spectrometer (MS).

=== XRF (X-ray fluorescence) ===
XRF (X-ray fluorescence) is also a common technique and is useful for both qualitative and quantitative data on ceramic samples. By analysing variations in secondary (fluorescent) X-rays scientists can identify, with significant accuracy, the various elements in the ceramic.

=== EPMA (Electron Plate Analysis) ===
EPMA determines elemental composition by bombarding a sample with an electron beam, causing it to emit characteristic X-rays. These X-rays are detected and analysed to identify elements. With high precision, EPMA is widely used in materials science, geology, and other fields. It helps understand material properties and investigate atomic-level details. By comparing detected X-rays with known standards, EPMA quantifies elements present in the sample.

=== SEM-EDS (Scanning Electron Microscopy / Energy Dispersive Spectroscopy) ===
SEM-EDS combines Scanning Electron Microscopy (SEM) and Energy Dispersive X-ray Spectroscopy (EDS) to analyse a ceramics surface and elemental composition. SEM scans the sample with an electron beam to create high-resolution images of its surface morphology. Simultaneously, EDS detects characteristic X-rays emitted by the sample, providing information about its elemental composition. SEM-EDS is widely used in materials science and geology to study microscale features, identify materials, and analyse elemental variations. It is a powerful tool for understanding surface characteristics and elemental makeup in a wide range of samples.

== History and uses ==
Ceramic petrography is used in academic archaeological research and commercial archaeology to address a range of issues. A common goal is tracing the movement of pottery and associated trade through provenance determination. The principle of provenance ascription with ceramic petrography relies on the fact that "the mineral and rock inclusions within a paste are a reflection of the geology of the source area of the ceramics" and that potters did not transport ceramic raw materials over significant distances.

An equally important concern is the nature of ancient ceramic production and its meaning in terms of the knowledge, skills, identity and traditions of potters. As synthetic materials, ceramics are "sensitive indicators of human decision making and materials interaction". By examining microstructural evidence for processes such as clay paste preparation, forming and firing, ceramic petrographers can reconstruct the steps involved in the production of ceramic artefacts.

Ceramic petrography originated in the American Southwest with the work of Anna O. Shepard but has mainly been developed in the Old World in the later half of the 20th century. Other early studies include the work of David Peacock and his students in the UK

Ceramic petrography continues to be applied to the interpretation of British ceramics and is used heavily in the prehistoric Aegean. In the USA the approach is less popular, though important contributions have been made in the area of quantitative petrography. Other attempts to extend ceramic petrography include the use of automated image analysis, the palaeontological analysis of microscopic fossils within ceramic thin sections and the combined statistical classification of petrographic and chemical data from artefacts.

Examples of Ceramic Petrography in archaeological settlements:

=== Linear Pottery Culture ===
Ceramic Petrography has been used extensively in the study of the Linear Pottery Culture (LBK), a European Neolithic culture dating to around 5550 BCE – 4500 BCE. Petrographic analysis has allowed archaeologists to classify LBK ceramics and establish chronological sequences. It has also allowed archaeologists to source raw materials, understand trade routes, and analyse the various production methods. By examining the mineralogical composition and microstructure of LBK pottery, researchers have identified geological sources of raw materials, revealing procurement strategies and exchange networks. Additionally, petrographic analysis has provided insights into pottery manufacturing, including clay selection, forming techniques, surface treatments, and firing methods, contributing to our understanding of technological advancements and cultural practices. Through ceramic petrography, archaeologists can now understand far more about this culture, even with limited material to work with. Indeed, ceramic petrography has shed light on LBK typology, chronology, raw material procurement, trade networks, and technological innovations within the broader context of Neolithic Europe.

=== Pavlopetri ===
Ceramic petrography has also been used in underwater locations, where excavations and analysis of remains can prove far more challenging. For example, in the submerged city of Pavlopetri (C. 3500 – 1500BCE) scientists have used petrography to examine the mineralogical make-up and microstructure of underwater pottery, allowing archaeologists to gain an insight into the trade routes, production methods, and various other cultural practices that the inhabitants of Pavlopetri adopted. From this analysis, scholars have been able to link Pavlopetri to trade in Minoan Crete.

=== Tang and Song Dynasties ===
Material from the Tang and Song dynastyies (C. 618–1279 A.D) has also been excavated and analysed using ceramic petrography, revealing a plethora of information on trade links, as well as stylistic elements. The Tang dynasty in Shanghai is well-known for its three-colour pottery and its bright colours. After analysing the remains of these artefacts, scientists have been able to trace trade over time, and can now see that maritime trade was only established later on in its history.

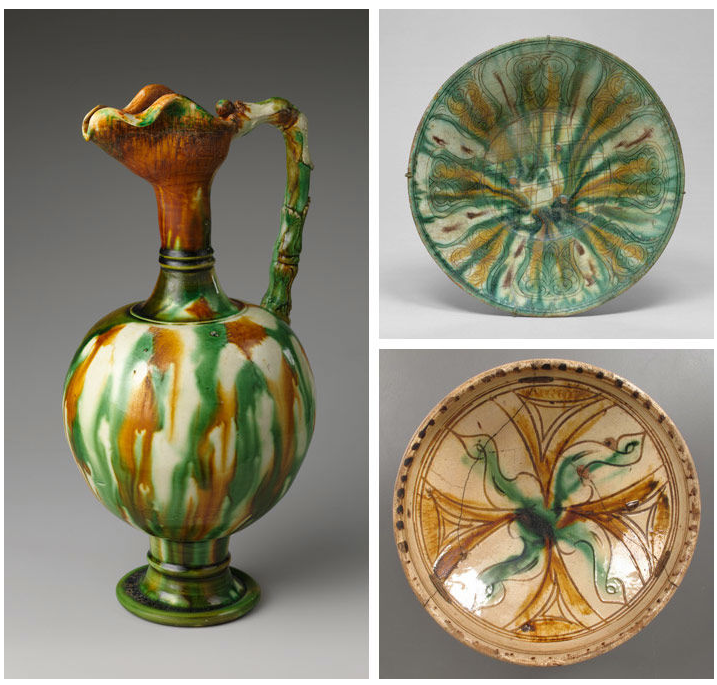
Tang Dynasty Ceramics (C. 607-918 AD)

Qinglong town, the heart of the dynasty was a prosperous maritime economy, with extensive links to adjacent islands. Indeed, through analyses of pottery from Qinglong and surrounding areas, archaeologists have discovered that the Tang and Song Dynasties had trade links with Persians, Arabs, Hindu Indians, Malays, Bengalis, Sinhalese, Khmers, Chams, Jews and Nestorian Christians of the Near East - a vast trade network that helps to explain the wide array of colours and materials in their ceramics.

=== Other uses ===
Thin section archaeological petrography can be applied to a range of other artefact types in addition to ceramics; these include plaster, mortar, mudbricks and lithic implements. It was also used for provenance and technology studies of the Amarna letters, as well as cuneiform tablets from the archives of Hattusa and the Southern Levant.

Academic papers on ceramic petrography are often published in journals such as Archaeometry, Journal of Archaeological Science and Geoarchaeology, as well as edited volumes. Petrographic research is often presented at the International Symposium on Archaeometry, the European Meeting on Ancient Ceramics and the meetings of the Ceramic Petrology Group.
