= List of villages in Charkhi Dadri district =

This is a list of villages in the Charkhi Dadri district of the Indian state of Haryana sorted by tehsil. Population data is from the 2011 Census of India.

== Badhra tehsil ==
Badhra tehsil
Town/Village name	Population	Males	Females
Badhra	6,333	3,319	3,014
Bilawal	2,578	1,367	1,211
Bariwas	447	218	229
Bhopali	841	445	396
Dandma	2,731	1,447	1,284
Duwarka	2,705	1,418	1,287
Govindpura	2,000	1,040	960
Jeetpura	2,258	1,202	1,056
Kakroli Hukmi	3,638	1,921	1,721
Kohlawas			
Khorra	2,358	1,257	1,101
Kakroli Hatti	2,400	1,280	1,120
Kakroli Sardara	2,951	1,589	1,362
Kari Tokha	1,006	518	488
Kari Adu	1,308	698	610
Kari Dass	1,387	720	667
Kari Rupa	1,203	653	550
Kubja Nagar			
Lad	2,376	1,256	1,120
Ladawas	1,992	1,049	943
Rehrodhi	2,839	1,574	1,265
Sham Kalyan	1,955	1,043	912
Umerwas	2,263	1,203	1,060

== Charkhi Dadri tehsil ==
Charkhi Dadri tehsil
Town/Village name	Population	Males	Females
Badal			
Balali			
Bhageshwari			
Changrod			
Chhapar			
Dohka Moji	1119	609	510
Fatehgarh			
Ghasola			
Gudana			
Hindol			
Jaishree	500 (approx.)		
Jhojhu Kalan			
Jawa			
Mandoli	2153	1113	1040
Mehra	2906	1513	1393
Phogat			
Sanjerwas			
Sanwar			
Sanwar			
Rambass	2861	1510	1351
Ranila			
Rawaldhi	5186	2857	2329
