= Bhopali (disambiguation) =

Bhopali is a Hindustani classical raga or melody

Bhopali may also refer to:

- Bhopali, Bhiwani, a village in the Bhiwani district of the Indian state of Haryana
- Bhopali, the demonym for natives of the Indian city of Bhopal

== People with the surname ==
- Asad Bhopali (1921–1990), Indian poet and lyricist
- Kaif Bhopali (1917–1991), Indian Urdu poet and lyricist
- Manzar Bhopali (born 1959), Indian Urdu poet
- Mohamed Barakatullah Bhopali (1854–1927), Indian revolutionary and the first prime minister of the Provisional Government of India
- Mohsin Bhopali (1932–2007), Pakistani poet and travel writer
- Shakeela Bano Bhopali (1942–2002), film actress and the first women Qawwal of India

== See also ==
- Bhopal (disambiguation)
