= Kakroli Sardara =

- Village
- Location in Haryana, India Kakroli Sardara (India)
- Coordinates: 28.5793°N 75.9757°E
- Country: India
- State: Haryana
- District: Charkhi Dadri
- Tehsil: Badhra

Government
  - Body: Village panchayat

Population (2011)
  - Total: 2,951

Languages
  - Official: Hindi Haryanvi
- Time zone: UTC+5:30 (IST)
- 131028: 127308
- Vehicle registration: HR88

Kakroli Sardara is a village in the Badhra tehsil of the Charkhi Dadri district in the Indian state of Haryana. Located approximately 34 kilometres (21 mi) from the district headquarters town of Charkhi Dadri, as of the 2011 Census of India, the village had 543 households with a total population of 2,951 of which 1,589 were male and 1,362 female.For political representational purposes the village is part of Badhra Assembly constituency and the Bhiwani-Mahendragarh Lok Sabha constituency.

== Gotra ==
Sheoran Mechu
