= Kari Rupa =

- Village
- Location in Haryana, India Kari Rupa (India)
- Coordinates: 28.5342°N 75.9043°E
- Country: India
- State: Haryana
- District: Charkhi Dadri district
- Tehsil: Badhra

Government
  - Body: Village panchayat

Population (2011)
  - Total: 1,203

Languages
  - Official: Hindi
- Time zone: UTC+5:30 (IST)
- PIN: 127308

Kari Rupa is a village in the Badhra tehsil of the Charkhi Dadri district in the Indian state of Haryana. Located approximately 37 kilometres (23 mi) south west of the district headquarters town of Charkhi Dadri, as of the 2011 Census of India, the village had 218 households with a total population of 1,203 of which 653 were male and 550 female.For political representational purposes the village is part of Badhra Assembly constituency and the Bhiwani-Mahendragarh Lok Sabha constituency.
