= Kari Dass =

Kari Dass Ancient Name Kari Mela Kari Rupa Dass. Before split in two villages
- Village
- Location in Haryana, India Kari Dass (India)
- Coordinates: 28.5338°N 75.9212°E
- Country: India
- Haryana: Haryana
- Charkhi Dadri: Charkhi Dadri
- Badhra: Badhra

Government
  - Body: Village panchayat

Population (2011)
  - Total: 1,387

Haryanavi, Hindi
  - Official Hindi: Hindi
- Time zone: UTC+5:30 (IST)
- 127308: 127308

Kari Dass is a village in the Badhra tehsil of the Charkhi Dadri district in the Indian state of Haryana. Located approximately 34 kilometres (21 mi) south west of the district headquarters town of Charkhi Dadri, as of the 2011 Census of India, the village had 257 households with a total population of 1,387 of which 720 were male and 667 female.
