= Kari Tokha =

- Village
- Location in Haryana, India Kari Tokha (India)
- Coordinates: 28.5421°N 75.8757°E
- Country: India
- State: Haryana
- District: Charkhi Dadri
- Tehsil: Badhra
- Founder: Tokh Ram Sheoran (Thus the village name came to be known as "Kari Tokha".)

Government
  - Body: Village panchayat

Population (2011)
  - Total: 1,006

Languages
  - Official: Hindi
- Time zone: UTC+5:30 (IST)

Kari Tokha is a village in the Badhra tehsil of the Charkhi Dadri district in the Indian state of Haryana. Located approximately 45 kilometres (28 mi) west of the district headquarters town of Charkhi Dadri, as of the 2011 Census of India, the village had 180 households with a total population of 1,006 of which 518 were male and 488 female.For political representational purposes the village is part of Badhra Assembly constituency and the Bhiwani-Mahendragarh Lok Sabha constituency.
