= Ladawas =

- Village
- Location in Haryana, India Ladawas (India)
- Coordinates: 28.5847°N 75.9322°E
- Country: Haryana
- State: Haryana
- District: Charkhi Dadri
- Tehsil: Badhra

Government
  - Body: Village panchayat

Population (2011)
  - Total: 1,992

Languages
  - Official: Hindi
- Time zone: UTC+5:30 (IST)

Ladawas is a village in the Badhra tehsil of the Charkhi Dadri district in the Indian state of Haryana. Located approximately 40 kilometres (25 mi) south west of the district headquarters town of Charkhi Dadri, as of the 2011 Census of India, the village had 430 households with a total population of 1,992 of which 1,049 were male and 943 female.
