= Jeetpura, Bhiwani =

Jeetpura
- Village
- Location in Haryana, India Jeetpura (India)
- Coordinates: 28.6014°N 75.9832°E
- Country: India
- State: Haryana
- District: Charkhi Dadri
- Tehsil: Badhra

Government
  - Body: Village panchayat

Population (2011)
  - Total: 2,258

Languages
  - Official: Hindi
- Time zone: UTC+5:30 (IST)

Jeetpura is a village in the Badhra tehsil of the Charkhi Dadri district in the Indian state of Haryana. Located approximately 46 kilometres (29 mi) south west of the district headquarters town of Charkhi Dadri, as of the 2011 Census of India, the village had 448 households with a total population of 2,258 of which 1,202 were male and 1,056 female.
