= Naurangabass Jattan =

Village in Haryana, India

Naurangabass Jattan is a small village in Charkhi Dadri of Charkhi Dadri district of Haryana. It is surrounded by hills of Aravali.

== Census ==
According to the 2011 census of India, the village had a total population of 1,647, out of which 860 were male and 787 female. The literacy rate is 66.47%, out of which 77% male and 54% female are literate.

Main caste is Jat along with 3-4% Scheduled Castes. Dhindhwal, Malik, Ahlawat, Gajraj, Sangwan, Sheoran and Jakhar are major Jat clans present here.

Agriculture is the main profession, although about 65% of youth are providing their services in the defence sector.

The Dada Ramsar ji temple is a place of worship which is located in the lap of Aravali mountains surrounding the village.

A very big fair is organized on the occasion of Holi (the Indian colour festival) at Dada Ramsar Ji Temple where people from different regions come to worship. The fair consists of many cultural and sports activities.

The place has peaceful & healthy environment and greenery at the mountains enhances its aesthetics. You can observe clouds touching mountain peaks from closely during monsoon.

Cattle farming is also done at a large scale, every household in the village owns at least 5 cattle.

The dairy business is also a main business for the household ladies.

== Education ==
The village has a high school and a primary school while 3 senior secondary schools are at just 3 km from it. This village has given armymen, teachers, doctors and many other professionals.

== Transport ==
It is well connected to cities and villages through roads. Nearest railway station is 7 km away at Nawan.
