= Badhwana =

Coordinates: 28°28′N 76°11′E

- Village
- Location in Haryana, India
- Country: India
- State: Haryana
- District: Charkhi Dadri
- Tehsil: Charkhi Dadri

Population (2011)
  - Total: 2,180

Languages
  - Official: Haryanvi, Hindi
- PIN: 127310

Badhwana is a village in the Charkhi Dadri tehsil of Charkhi Dadri district in the Indian state of Haryana. It is part of the Badhra Assembly constituency. The village was formerly under Bhiwani district; after the creation of Charkhi Dadri as a separate district on 1 December 2016, Badhwana became part of the new district.

== Geography ==
Badhwana is located approximately 20 km from the district headquarters at Charkhi Dadri. It lies in the semi-arid region of southern Haryana, characterised by flat plains and agricultural land.

== Demographics ==
As per the 2011 census of India, Badhwana had a population of 2,180, comprising 1,140 males and 1,040 females, across 426 households. The sex ratio was 912 females per 1,000 males, above the Haryana state average of 879. The child sex ratio (age 0–6) was 699, below the state average of 834. The literacy rate was 80.64%, compared to the state average of 75.55%; male literacy stood at 94.16% and female literacy at 66.31%.
