= Bhadra (disambiguation) =

Bhadra (भद्र) is a Sanskrit word and also the name of many Hindu mythological characters.

Bhadra may also refer to:

== Films ==
- Bhadra (2005 film), a Telugu film
- Bhadra (2011 film), a Kannada film
- Khaleja, a 2010 Telugu film dubbed in Tamil as Bhadra

== People ==
- Ashok Bhadra, Indian composer
- Birendra Krishna Bhadra (1905–1991), Indian broadcaster

== Places ==
- Badhra, Haryana, India
  - Badhra sub-district
  - Badhra (Haryana Assembly constituency)
- Bhadra, Rajasthan, India
  - Bhadra (Rajasthan Assembly constituency)
- Bhadra Dam, Karnataka, India
- Bhadra Fort, Ahmedabad, Gujarat, India
- Bhadra River, Karnataka, India
- Bhadra Wildlife Sanctuary, Karnataka, India

== Other uses ==
- Bhadran (disambiguation)
- Bhadra (Krishna's wife), an unrelated Hindu goddess
- Bhadra (Hindu calendar), a month in the Hindu calendar (August–September)
  - Bhadra (Nepali calendar), a month in the Nepali calendar
- Neope bhadra, a nymphalid butterfly
- Bhadra, a fictional character in the Indian Baahubali franchise
- Bhadra, a character in the 2014 video game Far Cry 4
