= Kari Adu =

- Village
- Nickname: Kari Baniya Wali
- Location in Haryana, India Kari Adu (India)
- Coordinates: 28.5403°N 75.8784°E
- Country: India
- State: Haryana
- District: Charkhi Dadri
- Tehsil: Badhra

Government
  - Body: Village panchayat

Population (2011)
  - Total: 1,308

Languages
  - Official: Hindi
- Time zone: UTC+5:30 (IST)

Kari Adu is a village in the Badhra tehsil of the Charkhi Dadri district in the Indian state of Haryana. Located approximately 45 kilometres (28 mi) south west of the district headquarters town of Charkhi Dadri, as of the 2011 Census of India, the village had 255 households with a total population of 1,308 of which 698 were male and 610 female.For political representational purposes the village is part of Badhra Assembly constituency and the Bhiwani-Mahendragarh Lok Sabha constituency.
