= Sham Kalyan =

Shyam Kalan
- Village
- Shyam Kalan
- Location in Haryana, India Shyam Kalan (India)
- Coordinates: 28.5884°N 75.8676°E
- Country: India
- State: Haryana
- District: Charkhi Dadri
- Block: Badhra

Government
  - Body: Village panchayat

Population (2011)
  - Total: 1,955

Languages
  - Official: Hindi, Haryanavi
- Time zone: UTC+5:30 (IST)
- PIN: 127030
- Vehicle registration: HR-88

Shyam Kalan is a village in the Badhra tehsil of the Charkhi Dadri district after separated from Bhiwani District of Haryana in 2016. It falls under the Hisar Division. Located 35 km from Bhiwani via Jui. 50 km away from Charkhi Dadri via Badhra. 150 km from Capital Territory of India, New Delhi.It is 300 km from Haryana's capital, Chandigarh.

As of the 2011 Census of India, the village had 381 households with a total population of 1,955 of which 1,043 were male and 912 female.

The people belong to Phulariya (फुलड़िया), Rangi (रांगी), Punia (पुनिया), Katariya (कटारिया) gotra in Jats.
