= Duwarka =

- Village
- Location in Haryana, India Duwarka (India)
- Coordinates: 28.5898°N 75.8900°E
- Country: India
- State: Haryana
- District: Charkhi Dadri
- Tehsil: Badhra

Government
  - Body: Village panchayat

Population (2011)
  - Total: 2,705

Languages
  - Official: Hindi
- Time zone: UTC+5:30 (IST)

Dwarka is a village in the Badhra tehsil of the Charkhi Dadri District in the Indian state of Haryana. Located approximately 34 kilometres (21 mi) south west of the town of Bhiwani, as of the 2011 Census of India, the village had 517 households with a total population of 2,705 of which 1,418 were male and 1,287 female.For political representational purposes the village is part of Badhra Assembly constituency and the Bhiwani-Mahendragarh Lok Sabha constituency.
