= Chhapar, Charkhi Dadri =

- Village
- Country: India
- State: Haryana
- Tehsil: Charkhi Dadri

Government
  - Body: Village panchayat

Population (2011)
  - Total: 6,026

Languages
  - Official: Hindi
- Time zone: UTC+5:30 (IST)
- PIN: 127306

Chhapar village is in Charkhi Dadri district, Haryana and its pincode is 127306. It has 1187 households.
