= Umerwas =

- Village
- Location in Haryana, India Umerwas (India)
- Coordinates: 28°35′36″N 75°59′54″E
- Country: India
- State: Haryana
- District: Charkhi Dadri
- Tehsil: Badhra

Government
  - Body: Village panchayat

Population (2011)
  - Total: 2,263

Languages
  - Official: Hindi
- Time zone: UTC+5:30 (IST)

Umerwas is a village in the Badhra tehsil of Charkhi Dadri district in the Indian state of Haryana. Located approximately 26 kilometres (16 mi) south west of the district headquarters town of Bhiwani, as of the 2011 Census of India, the village had 412 households with a total population of 2,263 of which 1,203 were male and 1,060 female.
