= Priyanka Phogat =

Indian freestyle wrestler

Personal information
- Nationality: (India) Indian
- Born: 12 May 1993 (age 33) Balali, Haryana, India
- Relative: Vinesh Phogat (sister)

Sport
- Country: India
- Sport: Freestyle wrestling
- Event: 55 kg
Medal record
Women's Freestyle Wrestling
Representing India
Asian Wrestling Championships
Silver medal – second place	2016 Bangkok	55 kg

Priyanka Phogat (born 12 May 1993) is an Indian female wrestler who won a silver medal at the 2016 Asian Wrestling Championships.

== Personal life ==
She is the sister of Commonwealth Games gold medalist wrestler Vinesh Phogat, niece of Dronacharya Award winner Mahavir Phogat, and cousin of Commonwealth Games gold medalist wrestlers - Geeta and Babita. She got married on 15 December 2021.

== Career ==
In 2015, Phogat bagged a ₹7 lakh contract with the Punjab franchise of the Pro Wrestling League.

Phogat won the silver medal at the Asian Wrestling Championships in Bangkok in February 2016 in the 55 kg category. She was defeated in the gold medal bout by Mongolia's Davaasükhiin Otgontsetseg.

== See also ==
- Phogat sisters
