= Ritu Phogat =

Indian mixed martial artist and wrestler

- Born: 2 May 1994 (age 32); Balali, Haryana, India
- Other names: The Indian Tigress
- Nationality: (India) Indian
- Height: 156 cm (5 ft 1 in)
- Weight: 52 kg (115 lb; 8 st 3 lb)
- Division: Atomweight
- Style: Wrestling
- Fighting out of: Singapore
- Team: Evolve MMA (2019–present)
- Trainer: Siyar Bahadurzada
- Years active: 2019–present

Mixed martial arts record
- Total: 12
- Wins: 7
- By knockout: 3
- By decision: 4
- Losses: 5
- By submission: 4
- By decision: 1

Other information
- Occupation: Mixed martial artists, Wrestler
- Spouse: Sachin Chhikara (m. 2022)
- Notable relatives: Daya Kaur (mother); Mahavir Singh Phogat (father); Geeta Phogat (sister); Babita Kumari (sister); Sangita Phogat (sister)
- Mixed martial arts record from Sherdog

Ritu Kumari Phogat (born 2 May 1994) is an Indian mixed martial artist who competed in the Atomweight division of ONE Championship. She is also a female wrestler who won a gold medal at the 2016 Commonwealth Wrestling Championship.

== Early and personal life ==
Ritu is the third daughter of former wrestler Mahavir Singh Phogat and started training under her father at the age of eight.

Her sisters Geeta Phogat and Babita Kumari as well as cousin Vinesh Phogat are all Commonwealth Games gold medalists in wrestling. Another cousin of her, Priyanka Phogat, is also an international level wrestler.

In November 2022 Ritu married Advocate Sachin Chhikara. On 13 June 2024, Phogat gave birth to her baby boy with her husband.

== Wrestling career ==
In October 2016, Phogat won her second consecutive title at the annual National Wrestling Championships. In November 2016, she won the gold medal at the 2016 Commonwealth Wrestling Championship in Singapore in the 48 kg category.

In December 2016, she became the most expensive female wrestler at the Pro Wrestling League auction, bagging a ₹36 lakh INR contract with the Jaipur Ninjas franchise.

In November 2017, she won silver in the 48 kg category in World U-23 Wrestling Championships being held in Bydgoscz, Poland. This is India's first silver in the championship.

== Mixed martial arts career ==
=== ONE Championship ===
In February 2019, Phogat signed with ONE Championship with the intention of making her mixed martial arts debut.

Phogat made her mixed martial arts debut against Nam Hee Kim at ONE Championship: Age Of Dragons in November 2019. She said, "In MMA my goal is to become the first Indian World champion."

Phogat faced Nou Srey Pov at ONE Championship: Inside the Matrix on 30 October 2020. She won the fight via TKO.

Just over a month removed from her last bout, Phogat faced Jomary Torres at ONE Championship: Big Bang on 4 December 2020. She won the fight via TKO due to elbows.

==== ONE Atomweight Grand Prix ====
Phogat faced Bi Nguyen at ONE Championship: Dangal on 15 May 2021 for a spot in the 2021 ONE Women's Atomweight Grand Prix. Phogat lost by split decision, suffering the first loss of her mixed martial arts career.

Phogat was scheduled to face Meng Bo in a quarterfinal bout of the 2021 ONE Women's Atomweight Grand Prix at ONE Championship: Empower on 28 May 2021. Instead, she faced Bi Nguyen in what was considered to be a warm-up bout. She lost the bout via a split decision. Due to the loss, Phogat was removed from the Grand Prix.

Phogat faced Lin Heqin at ONE Championship: Battleground on 30 July 2021. She won by unanimous decision. She has been added in the 2021 ONE Women's Atomweight Grand Prix after displaying dominant performance against Lin Heqin.

Phogat faced Meng Bo in a quarterfinal bout of the Atomweight World Grand-Prix at ONE Championship: Empower on September 3, 2021. After surviving an early onslaught in the first round, Phogat went on to dominate the final two rounds to win by unanimous decision and advance to the Grand Prix Semi Finals.

Phogat was scheduled to face Itsuki Hirata in the semi-final bout of ONE Women's Atomweight Grand Prix at ONE Championship: Next Generation on October 29, 2021. However, due to sickness, Hirata had to pull out of the bout and was replaced by Jenelyn Olsim. Phogat won the fight by unanimous decision.

Phogat faced Stamp Fairtex in the ONE Women's Atomweight Grand Prix Final at ONE: Winter Warriors on December 3, 2021. She was defeated by submission via armbar in the second round.

==== Continued ONE career ====
Phogat faced former ONE Women's Strawweight title challenger Tiffany Teo at ONE 161 on September 29, 2022. She lost the fight via rear-naked choke submission in the first round.

On February 28, 2023, it was announced that Phogat had signed a three-year exclusive deal with Kumite 1 League.

After a two-years hiatus, Phogat faced Ayaka Miura on February 20, 2025, at ONE 171. She lost the fight via a kneebar in round one.

On June 9, 2026, it was reported that Phogat was released by ONE Championship.

== Championships and accomplishments ==
=== Mixed martial arts ===
- ONE Championship
  - 2021 ONE Women's Atomweight World Grand Prix Runner-Up

== Mixed martial arts record ==
Professional record breakdown
12 matches	7 wins	5 losses
By knockout	3	0
By submission	0	4
By decision	4	1

Res.	Record	Opponent	Method	Event	Date	Round	Time	Location	Notes
Loss	7–5	Itsuki Hirata	Submission (rear-naked choke)	ONE Samurai 1	April 29, 2026	3	2:42	Tokyo, Japan	Catchweight (117.4 lb) bout; Phogat missed weight.
Loss	7–4	Ayaka Miura	Submission (kneebar)	ONE 171	February 20, 2025	1	2:24	Lusail, Qatar	
Loss	7–3	Tiffany Teo	Submission (rear-naked choke)	ONE 161	September 29, 2022	1	4:52	Kallang, Singapore	
Loss	7–2	Stamp Fairtex	Submission (armbar)	ONE: Winter Warriors	December 3, 2021	2	2:14	Kallang, Singapore	ONE Women's Atomweight World Grand Prix Final.
Win	7–1	Jenelyn Olsim	Decision (unanimous)	ONE: NextGen	October 29, 2021	3	5:00	Kallang, Singapore	ONE Women's Atomweight World Grand Prix Semifinal.
Win	6–1	Meng Bo	Decision (unanimous)	ONE: Empower	September 3, 2021	3	5:00	Kallang, Singapore	ONE Women's Atomweight World Grand Prix Quarterfinal.
Win	5–1	Lin Heqin	Decision (unanimous)	ONE: Battleground	July 30, 2021	3	5:00	Kallang, Singapore	
Loss	4–1	Bi Nguyen	Decision (split)	ONE: Dangal	May 15, 2021	3	5:00	Kallang, Singapore	
Win	4–0	Jomary Torres	TKO (elbows)	ONE: Big Bang	December 4, 2020	1	3:55	Kallang, Singapore	
Win	3–0	Nou Srey Pov	TKO (punches)	ONE: Inside the Matrix	October 30, 2020	2	2:02	Kallang, Singapore	
Win	2–0	Wu Chiao Chen	Decision (unanimous)	ONE: King of the Jungle	February 28, 2020	3	5:00	Kallang, Singapore	
Win	1–0	Kim Nam-hee	TKO (punches)	ONE: Age of Dragons	November 16, 2019	1	3:37	Beijing, China	Strawweight debut.

== See also ==
- List of female mixed martial artists
