= Birhi Kalan =

Birhi Kalan बिरही कलां
- Village
- Location in Haryana, India
- Coordinates: 28.59°N 76.15°E
- Country: India
- State: Haryana
- District: Charkhi Dadri
- Tehsil: Dadri-I

Area
  - Total: 13.49 km^{2} (5.21 sq mi)

Population (2011 Census)
  - Total: 4,649
- PIN: 127026
- Telephone code: 1250
- Vehicle registration: HR-19

Birhi Kalan is a village in Charkhi Dadri district of the Indian state of Haryana. It is located in Charkhi Dadri tehsil. As of the 2011 Census of India, the village had 879 households and a total population of 4,649, of which 2,433 were male and 2,216 were female.
