= Hindol (disambiguation) =

Hindol is a raga (musical mode) in Hindustani classical music (North Indian classical music).

Hindol may also refer to:

- Hindola, a Hindu festival
- Hindola Mahal, a palace in Mandu, Madhya Pradesh, India
- Hindol, Odisha, a town in Odisha, India
  - Hindol Assembly constituency
  - Hindol State, a former princely state in Odisha, India
  - Hindol Road railway station
- Hindol, Bhiwani, a village in Haryana, India
- Hindol Sengupta (born 1979), Indian journalist

== See also ==
- Hindolam, an equivalent raga in Caranatic music (South Indian classical music)
- Hindoli, a town in Rajasthan, India
  - Hindoli Assembly constituency
- Hindolasana in Eka Pada Prapadasana, a yoga asana (posture)
