= Buddhabhadra =

There were two Indian Buddhist masters named Buddhabhadra in China, both lived during the 5th century CE:

- Buddhabhadra (Shaolin abbot)
- Buddhabhadra (translator)

== See also ==
- Buddha (disambiguation)
- Bhadra (disambiguation)
