= Mandoli, Charkhi Dadri =

Village in Charkhi Dadri district, Haryana

Coordinates: 28.535°N 76.222°E

Mandoli is a village in the Charkhi Dadri district, formerly in the Bhiwani district, of the Indian state of Haryana. It lies approximately 9 kilometres (5.6 mi) south of the district headquarters town of Charkhi Dadri.

It has its own co-educational government school up to class 10.
