= Phogat, Charkhi Dadri =

Village in Charkhi Dadri, Haryana

Coordinates: 28.731°N 76.312°E

Phogat is a village in the Charkhi Dadri district of the Indian state of Haryana. It lies approximately 18 kilometres (11 mi) south of the district headquarters Charkhi Dadri.
