= Badal, Charkhi Dadri =

Badal
- Village
- Location in Haryana, India Badal (India)
- Coordinates: 28.540°N 76.130°E
- Country: India
- State: Haryana
- District: Bhiwani
- Tehsil: Charkhi Dadri

Government
  - Body: Village panchayat

Population (2011)
  - Total: 1,903

Languages
  - Official: Hindi
- Time zone: UTC+5:30 (IST)

Badal is a village in the Charkhi Dadri district of the Indian state of Haryana. Located in Charkhi Dadri tehsil, it lies 18 kilometres (11 mi) south of the district headquarters in Charkhi Dadri on the western border with the Jhajjar district. As of the 2011 Census of India, the village had 372 households with a total population of 1,903 of which 1,043 were male and 860 female.
