= Sanjerwas =

Village in Haryana, India

Coordinates: 28.727°N 76.318°E

Sanjerwas is a village in the Charkhi Dadri district of the Indian state of Haryana. Sanjarwas village is situated near the Charkhi Dadri-Kalanur State Highway. It lies approximately 16 km away from the district headquarters Charkhi Dadri.
