= Bilawal, Bhiwani =

Bilawal
- Village
- Location in Haryana, India Bilawal (India)
- Coordinates: 28.5738°N 76.0776°E
- Country: India
- State: Haryana
- District: charkhi Dadri
- Tehsil: charkhi dadri

Government
  - Body: Village panchayat

Population (2011)
  - Total: 2,579

Languages
  - Official: Hindi
- Time zone: UTC+5:30 (IST)

Bilawal is a village in the Badhra tehsil of the Charkhi Dadri in the Indian state of Haryana. Located approximately 20 kilometres (12 mi) west of the district headquarters town of Charkhi Dadri, as of the 2011 Census of India, the village had 535 households with a total population of 2,578 of which 1,367 were male and 1,211 female.
