= Jhinjhar =

Village in Haryana, India

- Village
- Location in Haryana, India Jhinjhar (India)
- Country: India
- State: Haryana
- District: District

Government
  - Body: Village panchayat

Area hectares
  - Total: 1,204 ha (2,980 acres)

Population (2011)
  - Total: 5,120
  - Density: 425/km^{2} (1,100/sq mi)

Languages
  - Official: Hindi
- Time zone: UTC+5:30 (IST)
- PIN: 127308

Jhinjar is a village located in Charkhi Dadri district in Haryana, India. It is situated 12 km away from district headquarter Dadri and 30 km away from Bhiwani. As per 2009 stats, Jhinjhar is the gram panchayat of Jhinjar village.
