= Dandma =

- Village
- Location in Haryana, India Dandma (India)
- Coordinates: 28.5736°N 75.8985°E
- Country: India
- State: Haryana
- District: Charkhi Dadri
- Tehsil: Badhra

Government
  - Body: Village panchayat

Population (2011)
  - Total: 1,955

Languages
  - Official: Hindi, Haryanvi
- Time zone: UTC+5:30 (IST)

Dandma is a village in the Badhra tehsil of the Bhiwani district in the Indian state of Haryana. Located approximately 34 kilometres (21 mi) south west of the district headquarters town of Bhiwani, as of the 2011 Census of India, the village had 506 households with a total population of 2,731 of which 1,447 were male and 1,284 female.For political representational purposes the village is part of Badhra Assembly constituency and the Bhiwani-Mahendragarh Lok Sabha constituency.
