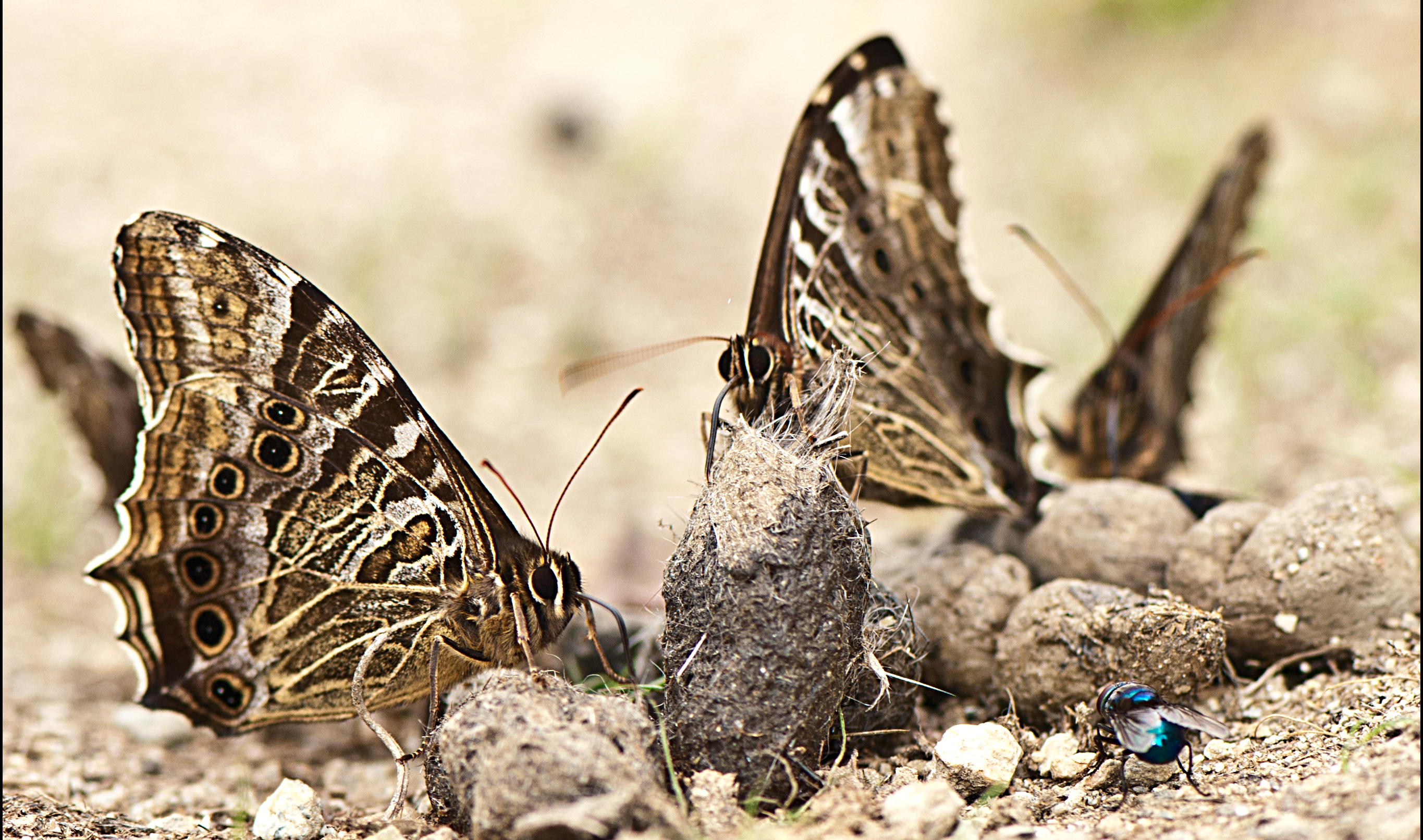
- Male

Scientific classification
- Kingdom: Animalia
- Phylum: Arthropoda
- Class: Insecta
- Order: Lepidoptera
- Family: Nymphalidae
- Genus: Neope
- Species: N. yama

Binomial name
- Neope yama (Moore, [1858])

Synonyms
- Zophoessa yama Moore, [1858]; Patala yama; Patala yamoides Moore, 1892

= Neope yama =

Species of butterfly

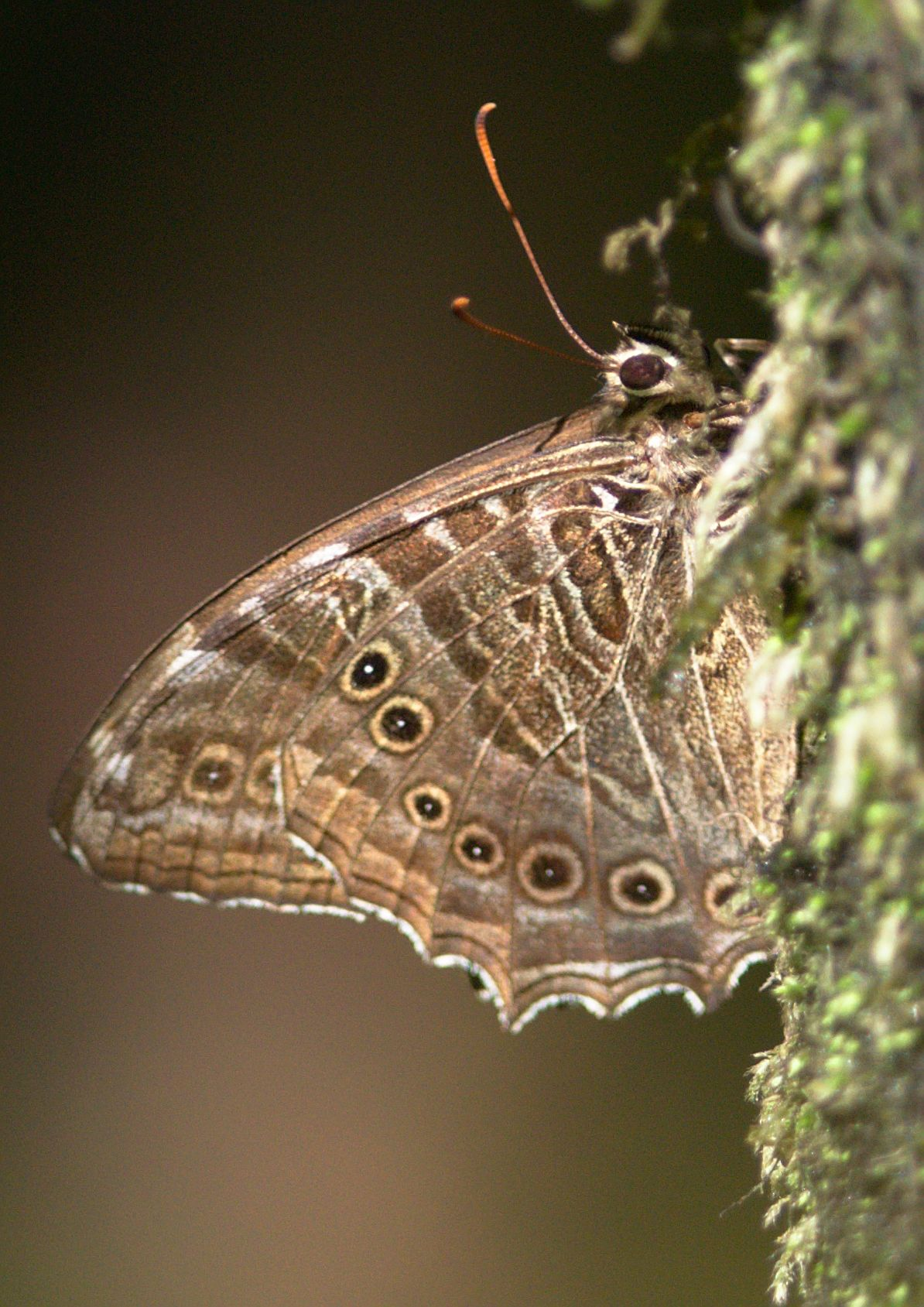
Seen in Village Sarmoli, Munsiari, Uttarakhand, flying in a forest

Neope yama, the dusky labyrinth, is a species of satyrine butterfly found in Asia. In the Himalayas it is common from the eastern Himalayas to eastern Nepal and less common from western Nepal to Himachal Pradesh.

== Description ==
Size 70 to 95 mm.

== Habits ==
Mostly a forest species. A fast flier but often stops on moist spots, carnivore scat and rests on tree trunks and rock surfaces.

== Status ==
Not a common butterfly and is classified as a Schedule II protected species as per the Indian Wildlife (Protection) Act, 1972

== Subspecies ==
- Neope yama yama – north-western India to Assam, Burma, Thailand
- Neope yama yamoides (Moore, 1892)
- Neope yama kinpingensis ( Lee, 1962) – Laos, northern Vietnam, southern China
