= Balali =

- Location in Haryana, India Balali (India)
- Coordinates: 28.50°N 76.17°E
- Country: India
- State: Haryana
- District: Charkhi Dadri district

Languages
  - Official: Hindi, Haryanvi language
- Time zone: UTC+5:30 (IST)
- PIN: 127310
- ISO 3166 code: IN-HR
- Vehicle registration: HR
- Nearest city: Charkhi Dadri

Balali is a village in the Charkhi Dadri district of Haryana State, India.

== Notable personalities ==
- Mahavir Singh Phogat, Dronacharya Awardee, father and mentor of the famous Phogat sisters — his four daughters Geeta, Babita, Ritu, and Sangita and his two nieces Vinesh and Priyanka — hail from this village.

== See also ==
- Gudana
