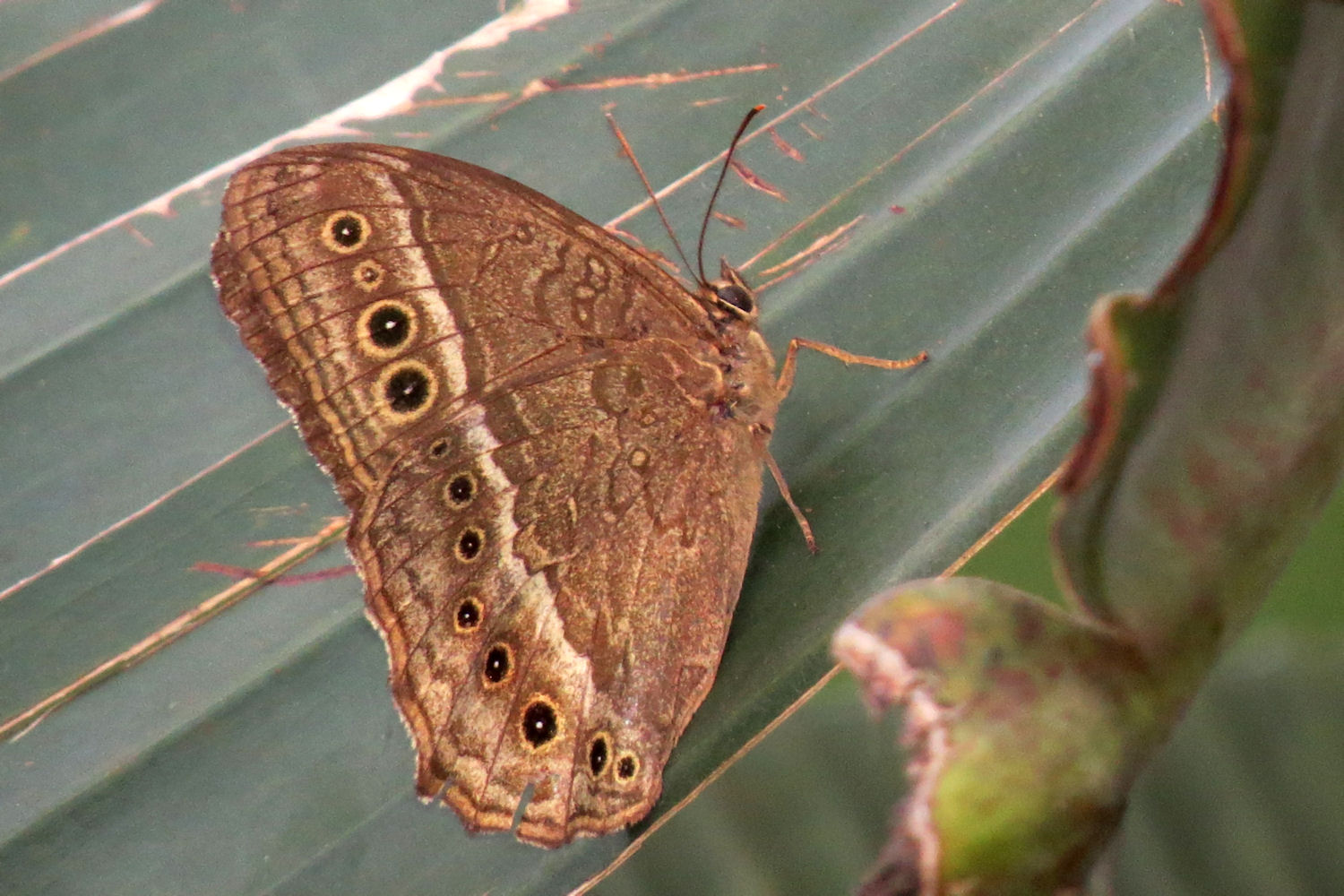
- Underside, in Vietnam

Scientific classification
- Domain: Eukaryota
- Kingdom: Animalia
- Phylum: Arthropoda
- Class: Insecta
- Order: Lepidoptera
- Family: Nymphalidae
- Genus: Neope
- Species: N. muirheadii

Binomial name
- Neope muirheadii (C. & R. Felder, 1862)

Synonyms
- Lasiommata muirheadii C. & R. Felder, 1862; Debis segonax Hewitson, 1862; Debis segonacia Oberthür, 1881; Neope bhima Marshall, 1881; Neope muirheadii var. felderi Leech, [1892]

= Neope muirheadii =

Black-spotted labyrinth

Species of butterfly

Neope muirheadii, the black-spotted labyrinth, is a species of butterfly in the family Nymphalidae. It is found in western and central China, Southeast Asia, and Taiwan.

== Subspecies ==
Listed alphabetically:

- N. m. bhima Marshall, 1881 – Burma (Shan States - Tenasserim)
- N. m. lahittei Janet, 1894 – northern Indochina
- N. m. felderi Leech, [1892]
- N. m. nagasawae Matsumura, 1919 – Taiwan
