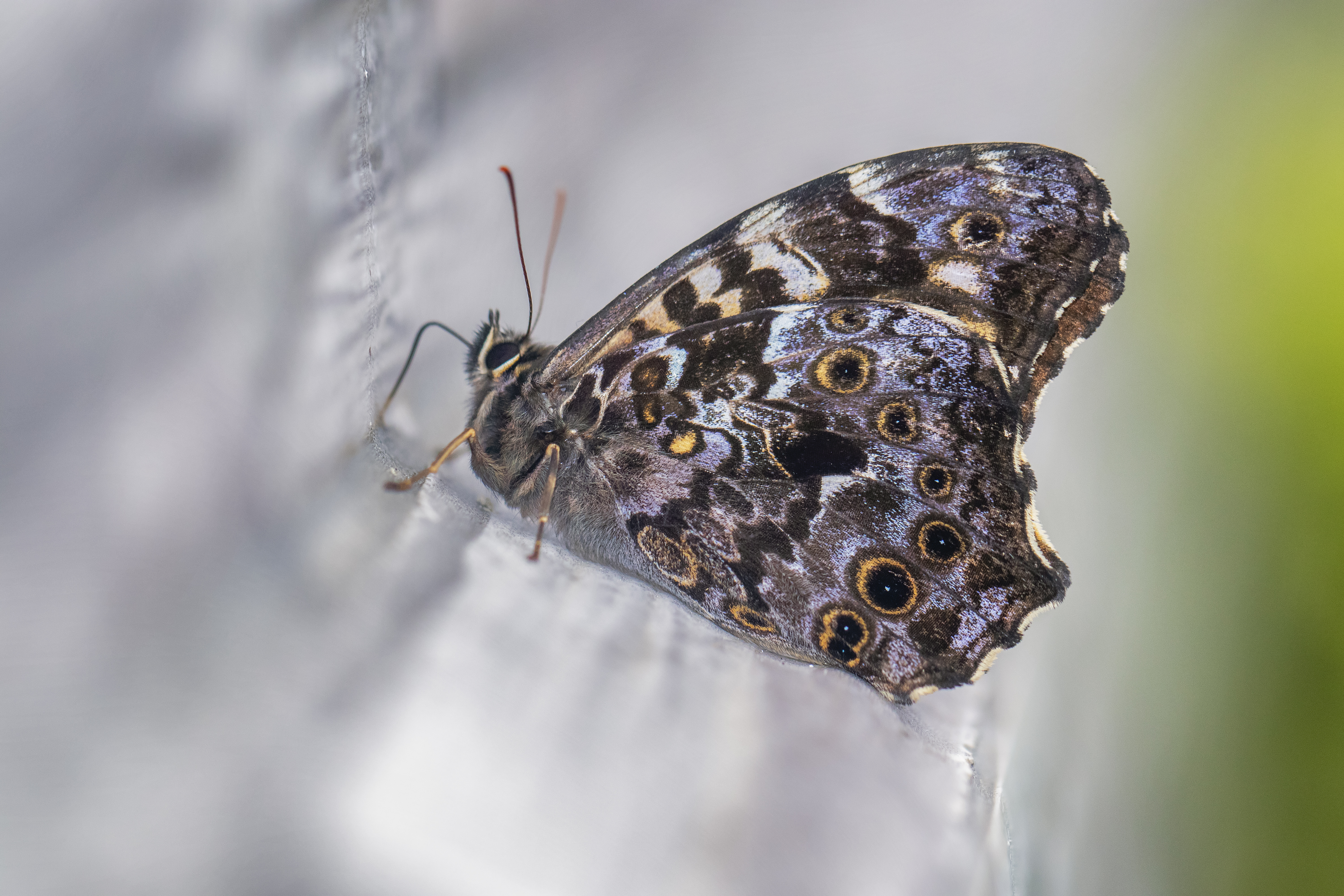

Scientific classification
- Kingdom: Animalia
- Phylum: Arthropoda
- Clade: Pancrustacea
- Class: Insecta
- Order: Lepidoptera
- Family: Nymphalidae
- Genus: Neope
- Species: N. pulaha

Binomial name
- Neope pulaha (Moore, [1858])

Synonyms
- Lasiommata pulaha Moore, [1858]; Blanaida pulaha; Neope pulahoides xizangana Wang, 1994; Lethe pandyia Talbot, 1947

= Neope pulaha =

Veined labyrinth

Species of butterfly

Neope pulaha, the veined labyrinth, is a species of satyrine butterfly found in Asia.

== Subspecies ==
- Neope pulaha pulaha (Bhutan, Sikkim, Assam to Burma, eastern Nepal and southern Tibet)
- Neope pulaha didia Fruhstorfer, 1909 (Taiwan)
- Neope pulaha pandyia (Talbot, 1947) (north-western Himalayas, western Nepal)
- Neope pulaha emeinsis C.L. Li, 1995 (western Sichuan)
- Neope pulaha nuae Huang, 2002 (Yunnan)
- Neope pulaha pulahoides (Moore, [1892]) Indochina – may be a good species
