= Bhadran =

Bhadran may refer to:

- Bhadran, Gujarat, a village in the state of Gujarat, India
- Bhadran (director) (born 1952), Indian filmmaker and writer

== See also ==
- Bhadra (disambiguation)
