= Kakroli Hatti =

- Village
- Location in Haryana, India Kakroli Hatti (India)
- Coordinates: 28.5754°N 75.9797°E
- Country: India
- State: Haryana
- District: Bhiwani
- Tehsil: Badhra

Government
  - Body: Village panchayat
  - Rank: 1

Population (2011)
  - Total: 2,400

Languages
  - Official: Hindi
- Time zone: UTC+5:30 (IST)

Kakroli Hatti is a village in the Badhra tehsil of the Bhiwani district in the Indian state of Haryana. Located approximately 29 kilometres (18 mi) south west of the district headquarters town of Bhiwani, as of the 2011 Census of India, the village had 445 households with a total population of 2,400 of which 1,280 were male and 1,120 female.For political representational purposes the village is part of Badhra Assembly constituency and the Bhiwani-Mahendragarh Lok Sabha constituency.
