= Rehrodhi =

- Village
- Location in Haryana, India Rehrodhi (India)
- Coordinates: 28.5742°N 76.0779°E
- Country: India
- State: Haryana
- District: Bhiwani
- Tehsil: Badhra

Government
  - Body: Village panchayat

Population (2011)
  - Total: 2,839

Languages
  - Official: Hindi
- Time zone: UTC+5:30 (IST)

Rehrodhi is a village in the Badhra tehsil of the Bhiwani district in the Indian state of Haryana. Located approximately 25 kilometres (16 mi) south of the district headquarters town of Bhiwani, as of the 2011 Census of India, the village had 527 households with a total population of 2,839 of which 1,574 were male and 1,265 female.For political representational purposes the village is part of Badhra Assembly constituency and the Bhiwani-Mahendragarh Lok Sabha constituency.
