= Khorra =

- Village
- Location in Haryana, India Khorra (India)
- Coordinates: 28.5205°N 75.8723°E
- Country: India
- State: Haryana
- District: Bhiwani
- Tehsil: Badhra

Government
  - Body: Village panchayat

Population (2011)
  - Total: 2,358

Languages
  - Official: Hindi
- Time zone: UTC+5:30 (IST)

Khorra is a village in the Badhra tehsil of the Bhiwani district in the Indian state of Haryana. Located approximately 37 kilometres (23 mi) south west of the district headquarters town of Bhiwani, as of the 2011 Census of India, the village had 433 households with a total population of 2,358 of which 1,257 were male and 1,101 female.For political representational purposes the village is part of Badhra Assembly constituency and the Bhiwani-Mahendragarh Lok Sabha constituency.
