= Bhopal (disambiguation) =

Bhopal may refer to:

- Bhopal, a city in India, capital of Madhya Pradesh state
- Bhopal District, a district in Madhya Pradesh, with the city of Bhopal as its headquarters
- Bhopal Division, an administrative geographical unit of Madhya Pradesh state
- Bhopal (state), the 18th century princely state in Central India
- Bhopal Agency, an administrative section of British India's Central India Agency
- Bhopal State (1949–56), in the Republic of India
- Bhopal (play), by Rahul Varma, based on the Bhopal disaster
- Bhopal: A Prayer for Rain, 2014 Indian English-language historical drama film

== See also ==
- Bhopali (disambiguation)
- Bhopal disaster, an industrial disaster that killed or injured over 560,000 victims in the city of Bhopal in December 1984
- Nawab of Bhopal, the title of the rulers of the princely state of Bhopal
- Bourbons of India, also known as the Bourbons of Bhopal, an important family in the region
- Bhopal (Lok Sabha constituency)
- Bhopalpatnam
