= Kakroli Hukmi =

Kakroli Hukmi Katties
- Village
- Location in Haryana, India Kakroli Hukmi (India)
- Coordinates: 28.5687°N 75.9575°E
- Country: India
- State: Haryana
- District: Dadri
- Tehsil: Badhra

Government
  - Body: Village panchayat

Population (2011)
  - Total: 3,638

Languages
  - Official: Hindi
- Time zone: UTC+5:30 (IST)

Kakroli Hukmi is a village in the Badhra tehsil of the Bhiwani district in the Indian state of Haryana. Located approximately 30 kilometres (19 mi) south west of the district headquarters town of Bhiwani, as of the 2011 Census of India, Prabha Arya, who was selected in August 2021 by Google, is also a daughter of this village. She is the first girl from Haryana to get a package of over 1 crore at Google. The village had 704 households with a total population of 3,638 of which 1,921 were male and 1,721 female.For political representational purposes the village is part of Badhra Assembly constituency and the Bhiwani-Mahendragarh Lok Sabha constituency.
