= Mahavir Singh Phogat =

Indian amateur wrestler and senior Olympics coach

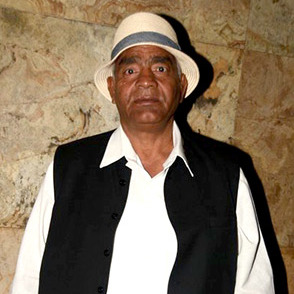
- Phogat in 2016

Personal information
- Nationality: Indian
- Born: Bhiwani, Haryana, India
- Spouse: Daya Kaur

Sport
- Country: India
- Sport: Wrestling
- Now coaching: Geeta Phogat, Babita Kumari, Ritu Phogat, Vinesh Phogat, Priyanka Phogat

Mahavir Singh Phogat is an Indian amateur wrestler, senior Olympics coach and politician. He is the trainer and father of the Phogat sisters. The Hindi biographical film Dangal is loosely based on his life.

Mahavir Singh Phogat was awarded the Dronacharya Award by the Government of India in 2016. He is the father and coach of Geeta Phogat, who won India's first gold medal in women's wrestling in the 55 kg freestyle category at the 2010 Commonwealth Games, and the first Indian woman wrestler to have qualified for the Olympics, and Babita Kumari, who won a bronze medal at the 2012 World Wrestling Championships, and won the gold medal in 2014 Commonwealth Games. Phogat's niece, Vinesh Phogat, was also a Commonwealth Games gold medalist and also won gold medal at Asian games 2018.

== Personal life ==
Phogat was born in Bhiwani district of Haryana. and hails from Balali in Charkhi Dadri district. He is married to Daya Shobha Kaur and has four daughters & one son - Geeta, Babita, Ritu, Sangita and Dushyant respectively. As a foster father, he also took care of his nieces Vinesh and Priyanka, children of his brother who was killed in a land dispute. All the 6 Phogats are trained in wrestling by Mahavir. While Geeta, Babita and Vinesh are international players, Ritu has won a gold medal at the national championship and Priyanka and Sangeeta have won medals in age-level international championships.

== Popular culture ==
=== Biographical film ===
The Indian biographical film Dangal is based on Singh's life and the journey of his daughters towards success. Aamir Khan plays the role of Mahavir Singh Phogat, while Fatima Sana Shaikh and Sanya Malhotra play the roles of his daughters Geeta and Babita respectively.

== Honours ==
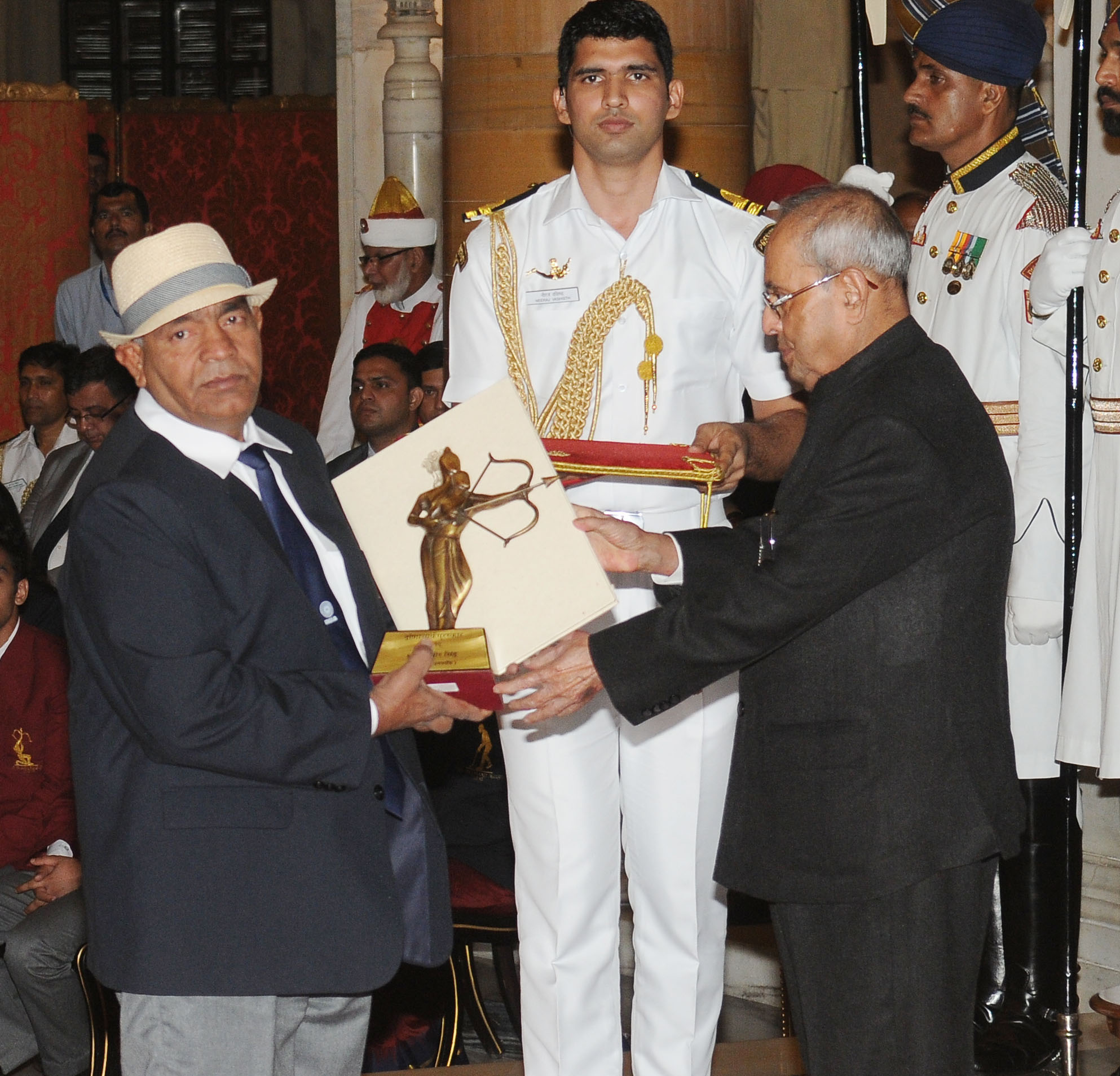
Mahavir Singh receiving the Dronacharya Award from President Pranab Mukherjee in August 2016

=== National Honours ===
- 2016 – Dronacharya Award

=== Book ===
Akhada is the authorised biography of Mahavir Singh Phogat, a former wrestler and a coach. The book is penned by sports journalist Sourabh Duggal and was released on 21 December 2016 at the Chandigarh Press Club. It traces Mahavir Phogat's journey with his daughters and nieces hailing from a small village in Haryana to winning the medals for the country.
