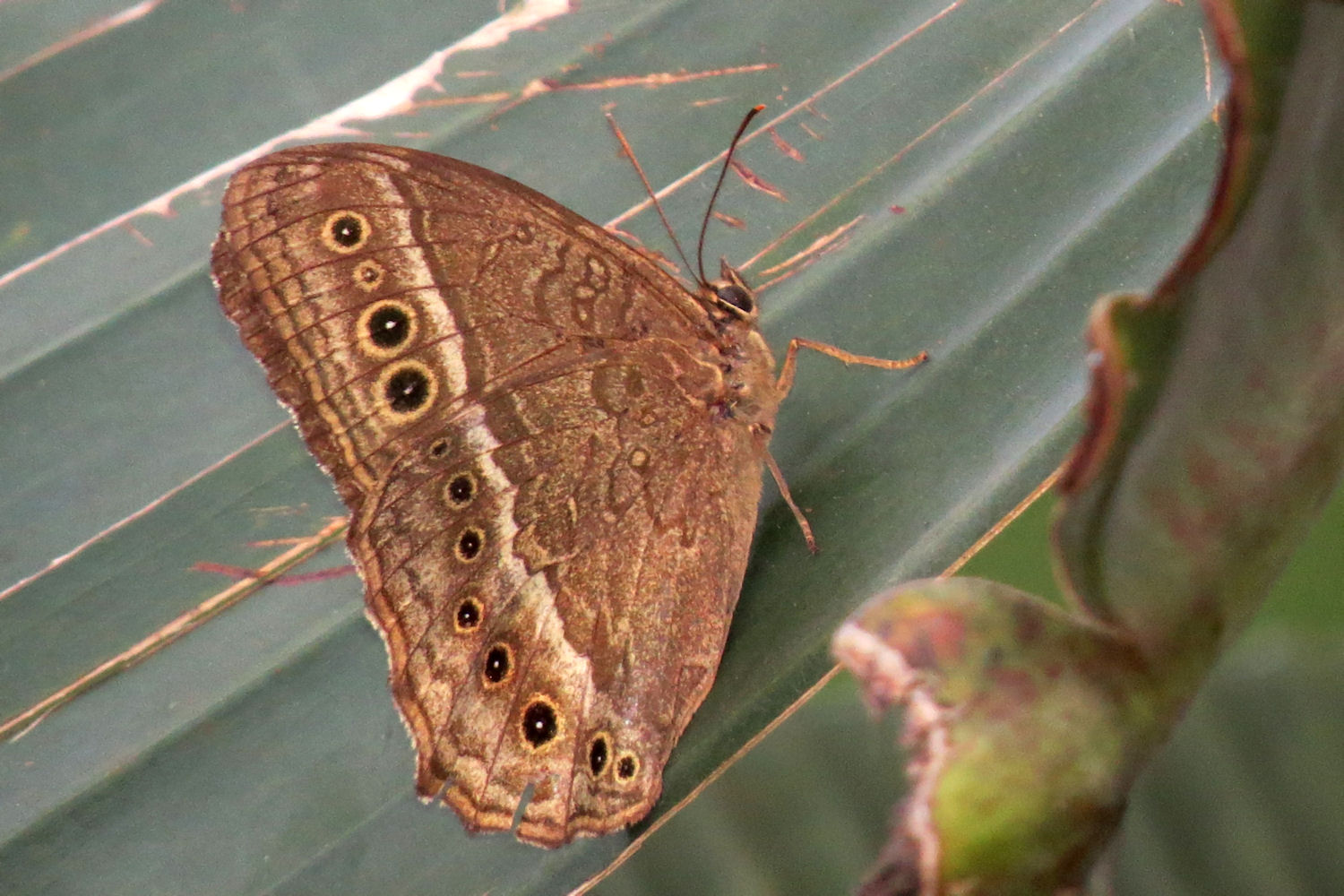
- Black-spotted labyrinth (Neope muirheadii), Vietnam

Scientific classification
- Domain: Eukaryota
- Kingdom: Animalia
- Phylum: Arthropoda
- Class: Insecta
- Order: Lepidoptera
- Family: Nymphalidae
- Tribe: Satyrini
- Genus: Neope; Moore, [1866]

Synonyms
- Enope Moore, 1857; Blanaida Kirby, 1877; Patala Moore, [1892]

= Neope =

Genus of brush-footed butterflies

Neope is a genus of butterflies of the family Nymphalidae found in Asia.

== Species ==
Listed alphabetically:

- Neope agrestis (Oberthür, 1876) – (China)
- Neope armandii (Oberthür, 1876) – (Assam, Myanmar, northern Thailand, Vietnam, Yunnan, China)
- Neope bhadra (Moore, 1857) – (Sikkim, Upper Burma)
- Neope bremeri (C. & R. Felder, 1862) – (China)
- Neope chayuensis Huang, 2002
- Neope christi Oberthür, 1886 – (China)
- Neope dejeani Oberthür, 1894
- Neope goschkevitschii (Ménétriés, 1857)
- Neope lacticolora (Fruhstorfer, 1908) – (Taiwan)
- Neope muirheadii (C. & R. Felder, 1862) – (China, Burma, Indochina)
- Neope niphonica Butler, 1881 – (Japan)
- Neope oberthueri Leech, 1891 – (China)
- Neope pulaha (Moore, [1858]) – veined labyrinth (Bhutan, Sikkim, Assam, Burma, Nepal, southern Tibet, Yunnan, Taiwan)
- Neope pulahina (Evans, 1923) – scarce labyrinth (Bhutan, Sikkim, Assam, south-eastern Tibet (Metok))
- Neope pulahoides (Moore, [1892]) - (Assam, Myanmar, northern Thailand, Laos, northern Vietnam, China)
- Neope ramosa Leech, 1890 – (China)
- Neope serica (Leech, 1892) – (China)
- Neope simulans Leech, 1891 – (Tibet)
- Neope watanabei Matsumura, 1909 – (Taiwan)
- Neope yama (Moore, [1858]) – (Bhutan, northern India)
