= Lad, Bhiwani =

Laad
- Village
- Location in Haryana, India Laad (India)
- Coordinates: 28.423°N 75.949°E
- Country: India
- State: Haryana
- District: Bhiwani
- Tehsil: Badhra

Government
  - Body: Village panchayat

Population (2011)
  - Total: 2,976

Languages
  - Official: Hindi
- Time zone: UTC+5:30 (IST)

Lad is a village in the Badhra tehsil of the Bhiwani district in the Indian state of Haryana. It lies approximately 46 kilometres (29 mi) south west of the district headquarters town of Bhiwani. As of the 2011 Census of India, the village had 450 households with a total population of 2,376 of which 1,256 were male and 1,120 female.For political representational purposes the village is part of Badhra Assembly constituency and the Bhiwani-Mahendragarh Lok Sabha constituency.
