= Sanwar =

Village in Charkhi Dadri, Haryana, India

Sanwar is a village under new formed district of Charkhi Dadri in Haryana, India. It lies on Charkhi Dari - Rohtak Road and is approximately 12 kilometres (7.5 mi) from Charkhi Dadri.

== Demographics ==
Prior to 18 September 2016, Sanwar was part of Bhiwani district in Haryana, India and is approximately 20 kilometres (12 mi) from Bhiwani city.

As of 2001 India census, population of Sanwar is 7674.
