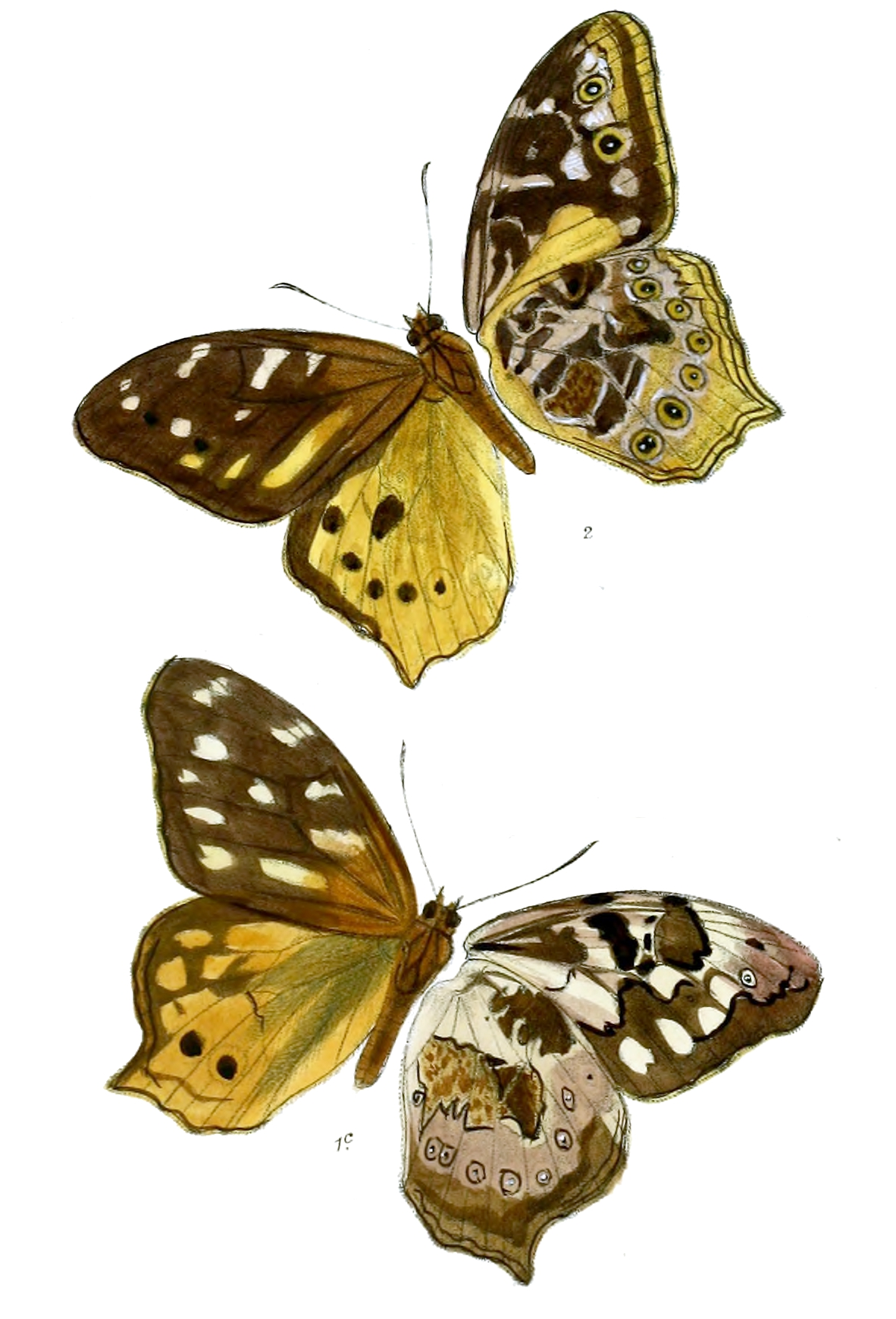

Scientific classification
- Domain: Eukaryota
- Kingdom: Animalia
- Phylum: Arthropoda
- Class: Insecta
- Order: Lepidoptera
- Family: Nymphalidae
- Genus: Neope
- Species: N. armandii

Binomial name
- Neope armandii (Oberthür, 1876)

Synonyms
- Satyrus armandii Oberthür, 1876; Blanaida khasiana; Neope khasiana Moore, 1881

= Neope armandii =

Species of butterfly

Neope armandii is a species of satyrine butterfly found in Asia.

== Subspecies ==
- Neope armandii armandii (western China, Assam, Burma)
- Neope armandii fusca Leech, 1891
- Neope armandii khasiana Moore, 1881 (Assam to Myanmar, northern Thailand, Vietnam, Yunnan)
