= Kohlawas =

- village
- Location in Haryana, India
- Coordinates: 28.6805°N 76.3021°E
- Country: India
- State: Haryana
- District: Charkhi Dadri

Population (2011)
  - Total: 1,329

Languages
  - Official: Hindi
- Time zone: UTC+5:30 (IST)

Kohlawas is a village located in the Charkhi Dadri district, in the northern state of Haryana, India.
