= Neope pulahina =

Scarce labyrinth

Scientific classification
- Kingdom: Animalia
- Phylum: Arthropoda
- Clade: Pancrustacea
- Class: Insecta
- Order: Lepidoptera
- Family: Nymphalidae
- Genus: Neope
- Species: N. pulahina

Binomial name
- Neope pulahina (Evans, 1923)

Species of butterfly

Neope pulahina, the scarce labyrinth, is a nymphalid butterfly found in India and South Asia.
