= Changrod =

Changroad
- Village
- Location in Haryana, India
- Coordinates: 28.4730°N 76.2057°E
- Country: India
- State: Haryana
- District: Charkhi Dadri
- Tehsil: Charkhi Dadri

Government
  - Body: Village panchayat

Population (2011)
  - Total: 3,604

Languages
  - Official: Hindi
- Time zone: UTC+5:30 (IST)
- PIN: 127022

Changroad is a village in Charkhi Dadri district of Haryana State . It falls under Rohtak Division and is located approximately 17 kilometers south, towards the Charkhi Dadri City and 23 km. from Kanina City and 2 km. from Badhwana village.

== Location and weather ==
Changroad is located in the Charkhi Dadri taluka (tehsil) of Charkhi Dadri district. It is located 2 km (1.2 mi) from the Village Badhwana at Charkhi Dadri-Mahendergarh Road. The district headquarters of Charkhi Dadri is approximately 17 km (11 mi) away, and the tehsil centre, Charkhi Dadri is about 17 km (11 mi) and Kanina City is 23 km. away. Meanwhile, the capital of Delhi is 130 kilometres (81 mi) to the east.

Changroad is dry and quite hot in the summer, experiencing inverse conditions in the winter with gusts of wind.

== Demographics ==
The people in Changroad belong to various castes, such as Ahirs, Jats, Brahmins, Banias, Kumhars, Darzis, Khatis and Harijans. There are also a small number of Bawariyas and a single Muslim family, who were saved by the village people during the 1947 Partition of India.

As of the 2011 Census of India, the population of Changroad was 3,604; 1,908 males and 1,696 females. The literacy rate for the village is 81% with 94% of males and 67% of females being educated.

== Education ==
The village has two primary schools each for boys and girls, Meva Devi Girls Primary School was constructed by Sh.Dayanand Sharma in the memory of their late mother Smt.Meva Devi Sharma to promote girls education in 1991 and one privately owned primary school. The Higher secondary school has served the village for more than 40 years. The village has connectivity to cellphone and internet [Jio, Idea-Vodafone, BSNL]. The public transport system is fairly basic, even after years of road connectivity to Charkhi Dadri and Kanina, but this is still under development

== Employment ==
Most of the village's residents work on ancestral farms but they also have a special attachment to the Indian Armed Forces. The village has many Senior Commissioned Officers. The village also has Commandant Rank Officers and Assistant Account Officer in central government. The younger residents are employed in medicine, artificial intelligence, data science, engineering technology and teaching. There are doctors, professors, Commissioned Officers, Subedar Majors and technocrats too in the village.

== Agriculture ==
There is an acute shortage of ground water in the village because it only rains during the months of July and August. There are irrigation canals on both sides of the village, but they are usually dry. The major crops of this area are millet, wheat, mustard and chickpea.
