= Govindpura, Bhiwani =

Govindpura
- Village
- Location in Haryana, India Govindpura (India)
- Coordinates: 28.4838°N 75.8937°E
- Country: India
- State: Haryana
- District: Bhiwani
- Tehsil: Badhra

Government
  - Body: Village panchayat

Population (2011)
  - Total: 2,000

Languages
  - Official: Hindi
- Time zone: UTC+5:30 (IST)

Govindpura is a village in the Badhra tehsil of the Bhiwani district in the Indian state of Haryana. Located approximately 16 kilometres (9.9 mi) south east of the district headquarters town of Bhiwani, as of the 2011 Census of India, the village had 388 households with a total population of 2,000 of which 1,040 were male and 960 female.For political representational purposes the village is part of Badhra Assembly constituency and the Bhiwani-Mahendragarh Lok Sabha constituency.
