= Bhageshwari =

Bhageshwari Bhagesri
- village
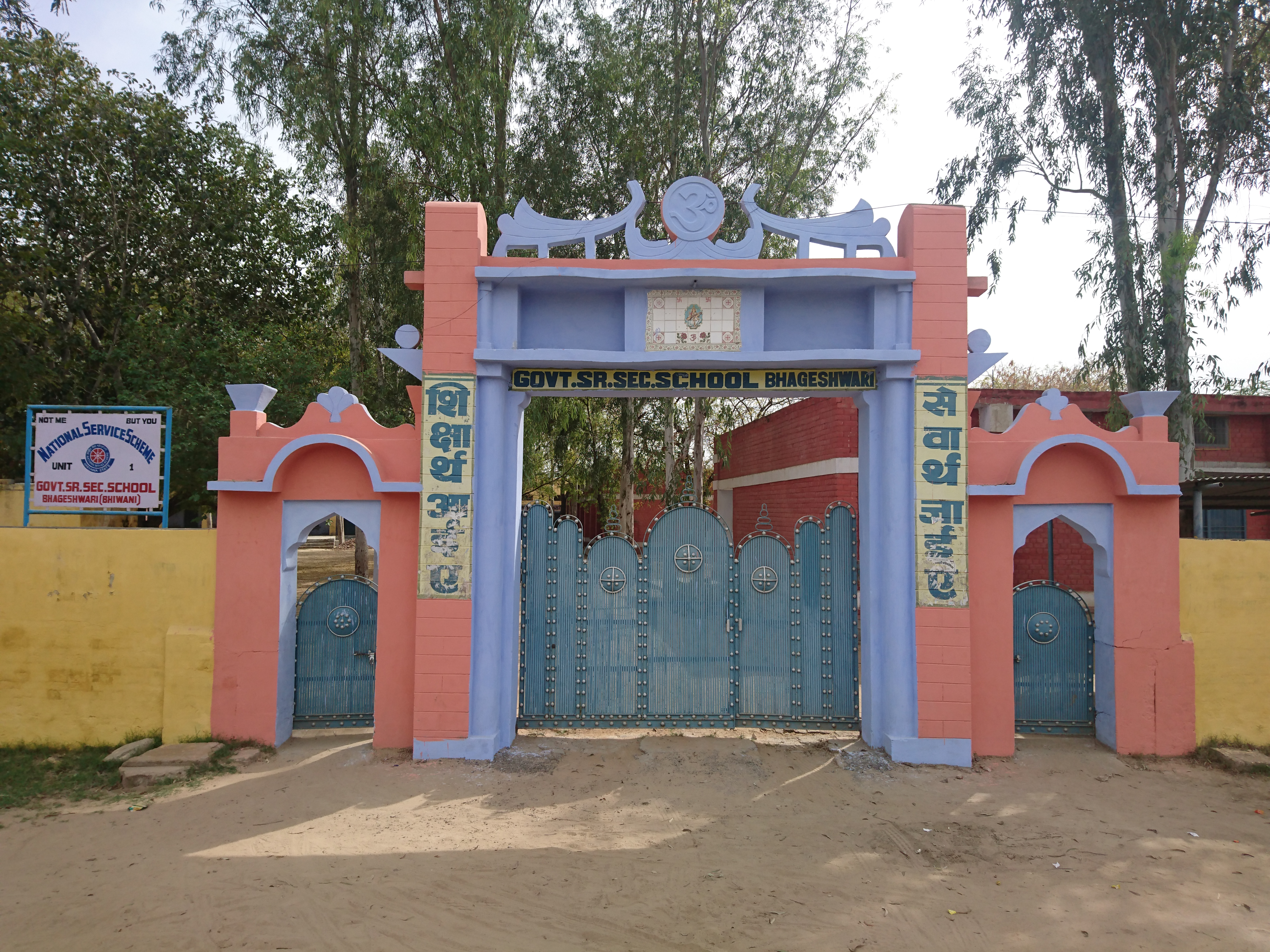
- The main entrance of Government Senior Secondary School, Bhageshwari

- Location in Haryana, India Bhageshwari (India)
- Coordinates: 28°40′46.0488″N 76°21′16.516″E
- Country: India
- State: Haryana
- District: Charkhi Dadri district

Government
  - Type: Local government
  - Body: Panchayat

Area
  - Total: 7.24 km^{2} (2.80 sq mi)
- Elevation: 217 m (712 ft)

Population (2011)
  - Total: 2,871
  - Density: 397/km^{2} (1,030/sq mi)

Languages
  - Official: Hindi
- Time zone: UTC+5:30 (IST)
- PIN: 127307
- Telephone code: 01262
- Vehicle registration: HR-19
- Literacy: 80.03% (total); 94.50% (male); 64.91% (female)
- Sex ratio: 935 ♂/♀

Bhageshwari or Bhagesri is a village in Dadri Tehsil of Charkhi Dadri district, Haryana, India. It is situated 14 kilometres (8.7 mi) away from district headquarter Charkhi Dadri. The Governing body of the village is Gram Panchayat.

== Demographics ==
Most of the population of the village is Hindu and widely spoken language is Haryanvi and Hindi. The majority caste of the village is Ahir.

== Students Career in Higher Mathematics ==
- Chennai Mathematical Institute, https://www.cmi.ac.in/
- Tata Institute of Fundamental Research,

https://www.tifr.res.in/

- Indian Statistical Institutes (Different states), https://www.isid.ac.in/
- Department of Mathematics, University of Delhi, https://maths.du.ac.in/
- Department of Applied Mathematics, Delhi Technological University (Formerly, Delhi College of Engineering), https://dtu.ac.in/

== Historical Contribution ==
- In Battle of Rezang La,

Battle of Rezang La

✓ Subedar, ManoharLal Yadav

✓ one Martyred

== Temple ==
- Krishna Temple
- Khatu Shyam Temple
- Baba Kanha Nath Temple

== Food Points ==
- Main chowk: Sweets shop
- burger, Pizza.

== Hospitals and Medicals ==
- Community Health Centre (CHC)- Near Krishna Mandir
- Government Veterinary Hospital
- Medical Store at Main Chowk
- DR. Daya kishan Clinic (94165 20718)

== Skill Enhancement Center ==
- No Artificial Intelligence training center
- No physical and Digital Library
- No Communication Skill centre for Kids
- No Playing Park for Kids
- No reputed Govt. Engineering College within 25 KM Area.

== Schools ==
- Govt. Sr. Sec. School
- Vision India Sr. Sec Public school.
- Govt. Primary School, Now it is Gram Sachivalye

== Transportation ==
The nearest railway station of the village is Charkhi Dadri and Bhiwani Railway Station. Bus Services available in village are:

1. Bhageshwari To Bhiwani
2. Bhageshwari To Charkhi Dadri
3. Bhageswari To Jhajjar and Gurugram
4. Charkhi Dadri via Bhageswari to Rohtak

== Adjacent Village's ==
Ranila - 3 km, Achina - 0.5 km, Jhinjhar - 1.8 km, Sanjarwas - 9 km, Sanwar - 6 km. Are the nearby village's of Bhageswari.
