= Ghasola =

- village
- Location in Haryana, India Ghasola (India)
- Coordinates: 28.553729°N 76.261082°E
- Country: India
- State: Haryana
- Founder: Ghasiram Chhahar

Government
  - Body: Gram panchayat

Languages
  - Official: Hindi
- Time zone: UTC+5:30 (IST)
- Postal code: 127306
- ISO 3166 code: IN-HR
- Vehicle registration: HR
- Website: haryana.gov.in

Ghasola is a village in Charkhi Dadri District in the Indian state of Haryana. It is situated at about 4 kilometres (2.5 mi) from the district Charkhi Dadri. The village has a higher secondary school for boys and a high school for girls.
