= Fatehgarh, Bhiwani =

Fatehgarh
- Village
- Location in Haryana, India Fatehgarh (India)
- Coordinates: 28.59°N 76.27°E
- Country: India
- State: Haryana
- District: Bhiwani
- Tehsil: Charkhi Dadri

Government
  - Body: Village panchayat

Population (2011)
  - Total: 3,226

Languages
  - Official: Hindi
- Time zone: UTC+5:30 (IST)

Fatehgarh is a village in the Bhiwani district of the Indian state of Haryana. It lies approximately 18 kilometres (11 mi) south of the district headquarters town of Bhiwani. As of the 2011 Census of India, the village had 655 households with a total population of 3,226 of which 1,707 were male and 1,519 female.
