= Mohsin Bhopali =

- Born: Bhopal, British India
- Died: 17 January 2007; Karachi, Pakistan
- Resting place: Paposh Graveyard
- Occupation: Poet

Mohsin Bhopali (Urdu: مُحسِن بھوپالی) (born 29 Sep 1932- 17 January 2007) was a Pakistani poet.

His real name was Abdur Rahman. he was born in Bhopal but his family migrated to Pakistan after partition. He was disciple of Seemab Akbarabadi and Saba Mathravi. He attained great fame as ghazal-go poet. In old age he suffered from throat cancer. He was operated upon abroad. His life was saved but his golden musical voice was gone for ever. Some of his important works are shikast-e-shab, jasta-jasta, Majra, gard-e-masafat, Nazmane, etc. He died in Karachi on 17th January 2007.

He was known for a travelogue called Hairaton ki Sarzamin (Urdu for "The Land of Wonders") and a book of verses Shahr-i-Ashob in opposition to the 1992 military operation in Karachi.
