= Bhopali, Bhiwani =

Bhopali
- Village
- Location in Haryana, India Bhopali (India)
- Coordinates: 28.5416°N 75.9427°E
- Country: India
- State: Haryana
- District: Bhiwani
- Tehsil: Tosham

Government
  - Body: Village panchayat

Population (2011)
  - Total: 841

Languages
  - Official: Hindi
- Time zone: UTC+5:30 (IST)

Bhopali is a village in the Badhra tehsil of the Bhiwani district in the Indian state of Haryana. Located approximately 38 kilometres (24 mi) south west of the district headquarters town of Bhiwani, as of the 2011 Census of India, the village had 162 households with a total population of 841 of which 445 were male and 396 female.For political representational purposes the village is part of Badhra Assembly constituency and the Bhiwani-Mahendragarh Lok Sabha constituency.
