= Hindol, Bhiwani =

Hindol
- Village
- Location in Haryana, India Hindol (India)
- Coordinates: 28.7089°N 76.2676°E
- Country: India
- State: Haryana
- District: Bhiwani
- Tehsil: Charkhi Dadri

Government
  - Body: Village panchayat

Population (2011)
  - Total: 2,564

Languages
  - Official: Hindi
- Time zone: UTC+5:30 (IST)

Hindol is a village in the Bhiwani district of the Indian state of Haryana. Located in the Charkhi Dadri tehsil, it lies approximately 16 kilometres (9.9 mi) southeast of the district headquarters town of Bhiwani. As of the 2011 Census of India, the village had 514 households with a total population of 2,564, of which 1,338 were male and 1,226 female.
