= Gudana =

Village in Haryana state in India

Budana
- Location in Haryana, India Budana (India)
- Coordinates: 28.5209852°N 76.1036467°E
- Country: India
- State: Haryana
- District: Narnaund Hisar district

Languages
  - Official: Hindi, Haryanvi language
- Time zone: UTC+5:30 (IST)
- PIN: 125039
- ISO 3166 code: IN-HR
- Vehicle registration: HR
- Nearest city: Hisar

Budana is a village in the Narnaund tehsil of Hisar district of Haryana state in India.

== Demographic ==
As per 2011 census of India, it has a population of 2483, 1295 are males and 1188 females, in 504 families with an Average Sex Ratio of 917 and literacy rate of 78.53%.

== Administration ==
As it is governed by the local village panchayat under the Panchayati raj system headed by a Sarpanch.

== Notable personalities ==
- Pooja Dhanda, Olympic wrestler

== See also ==
- Balali
- Kanwari
