= Shakeela Bano Bhopali =

Film Actress and first women Qawwal of India

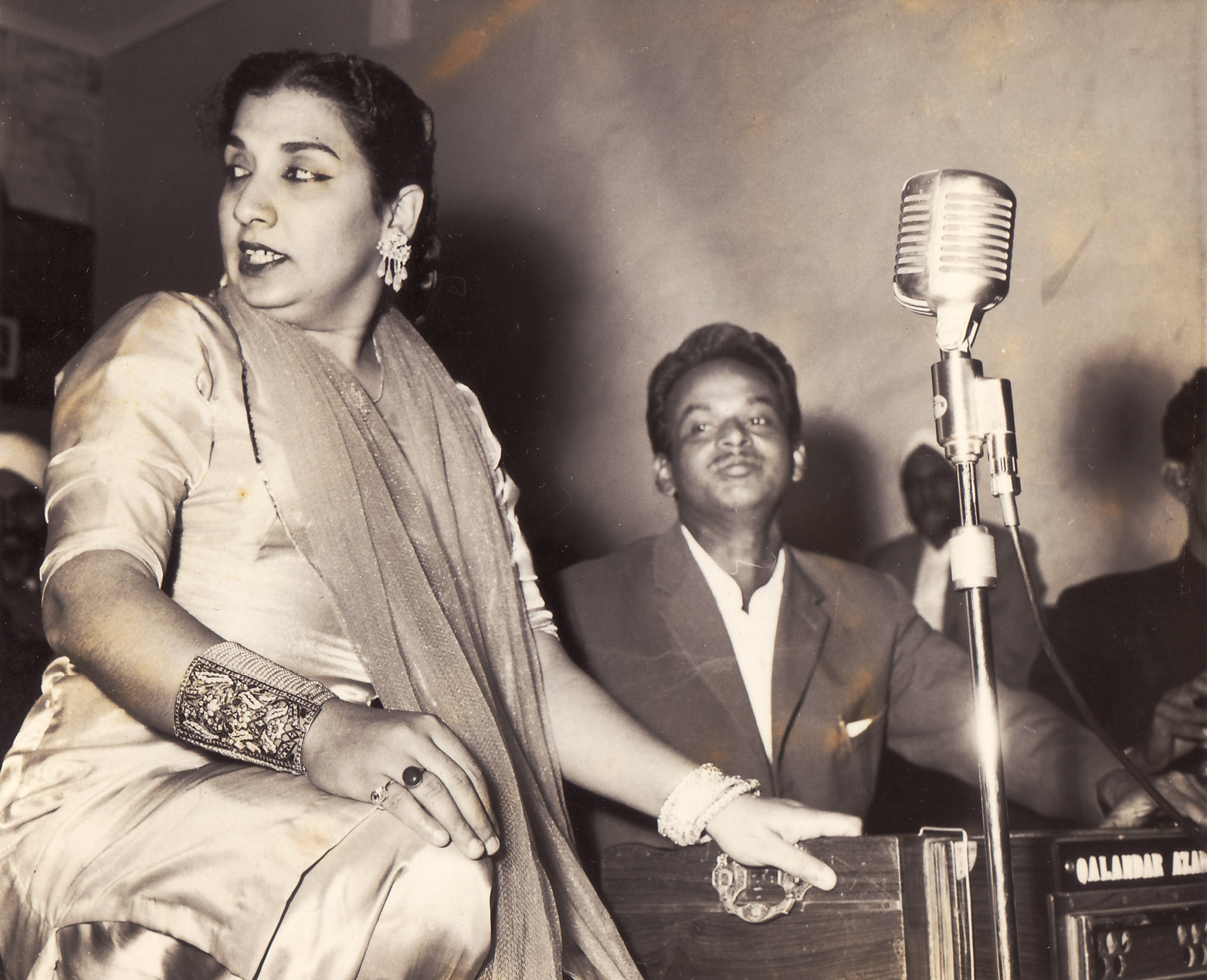
- Shaeekla Bano in Nairobi, 1963

Background information
- Born: 1942; Bhopal, Madhya Pradesh, India
- Died: 16 December 2002 (aged 59–60) St. George Hospital
- Occupations: Qawwal, Actress

Shakeela Bano Bhopali (1942 - December 16, 2002) was an Indian actress and the first woman Qawwal of India.

== Early life ==
She was born in 1942 in Bhopal, a town that since 1956 has been Capital of newly formed state of Madhya Pradesh. She is known for her acting in Jageer, Tarzaan, Badshah and Raaka. She lost her voice in the Bhopal disaster in 1984 and died on 16 December 2002 at St. George Hospital after a massive cardiac attack.
