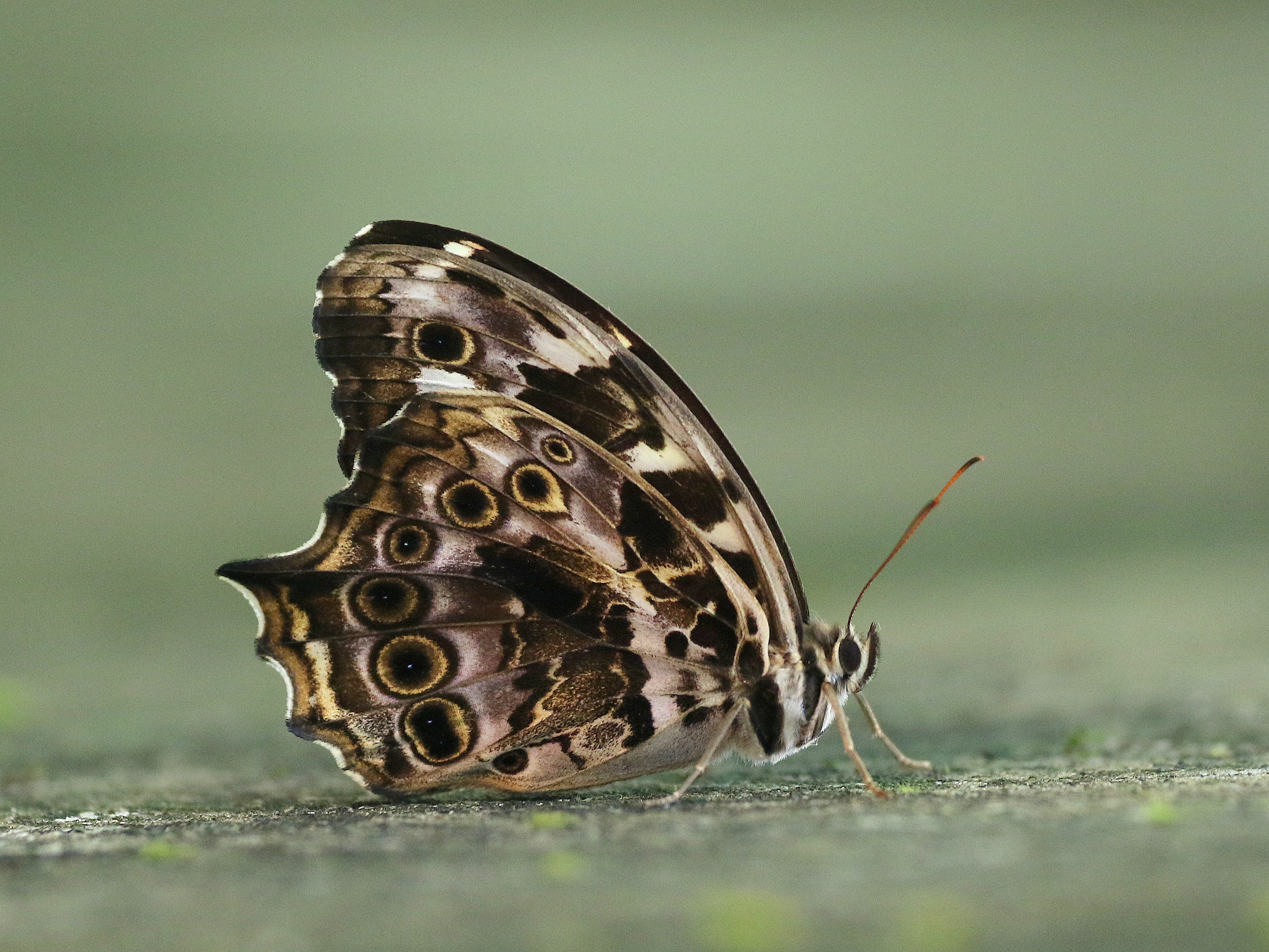

Scientific classification
- Domain: Eukaryota
- Kingdom: Animalia
- Phylum: Arthropoda
- Class: Insecta
- Order: Lepidoptera
- Family: Nymphalidae
- Genus: Neope
- Species: N. bhadra

Binomial name
- Neope bhadra (Moore, 1857)

Synonyms
- Lasiommata bhadra Moore, 1857; Lethe bhadra f. beata Talbot, 1947

= Neope bhadra =

Species of butterfly

Neope bhadra is a nymphalid butterfly known from Asia, where it is found from Sikkim to Upper Burma.

== Subspecies ==
- Neope bhadra bhadra
- Neope bhadra subflava Zhou, 1994 (Guangxi)
