= Bariwas =

Bhariwas
- Village
- Location in Haryana, India Bhariwas (India)
- Coordinates: 28.5946°N 75.9669°E
- Country: India
- State: Haryana
- District: Bhiwani
- Tehsil: Tosham

Government
  - Body: Village panchayat

Population (2011)
  - Total: 3,300

Languages
  - Official: Hindi
- Time zone: UTC+5:30 (IST)
- PIN: 127043

Bariwas or Bhariwass is a village in the Tosham tehsil of the Bhiwani district in the Indian state of Haryana. Located approximately 30 kilometres (19 mi) south west of the district headquarters town of Bhiwani, as of the 2011 Census of India, the village had 400 households with a total population of 3300 of which 1700 were male and 1600 female.
