= Sheoran =

Sheoran is an Indian Jat surname. Notable people with the surname include:

- Anita Sheoran (born 1984), Indian wrestler
- Lakshay Sheoran (born 1998), Indian sport shooter
- Nirmala Sheoran (born 1995), Indian sprinter
- Shilpi Sheoran (born 1989), Indian wrestler
- Sukhvinder Sheoran (born 1985), Indian politician
- Insp. Satbir Singh Sheoran (BSF) Village Singhani, District Bhiwani awarded medals for OP Vijay and Prakaram. Awarded DG commendation card for distinguish services.
