= Babita Kumari =

Indian wrestler (born 1989)

Babita Phogat
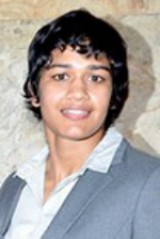
- Phogat in 2016

Personal information
- Nationality: (India) Indian
- Born: 20 November 1989 (age 36) Bhiwani, Haryana, India
- Height: 160 cm (5 ft 3 in)
- Spouse: Vivek Suhag

Personal details
- Party: Bharatiya Janata Party

Sport
- Sport: Freestyle wrestling
- Event: 55 kg
- Coached by: Mahavir Singh Phogat
Medal record
Women's Freestyle Wrestling
Representing India
World Championships
Bronze medal – third place	2012 Strathcona County	51 kg
Commonwealth Games
Gold medal – first place	2014 Glasgow	55 kg
Silver medal – second place	2010 Delhi	51 kg
Silver medal – second place	2018 Goldcoast	53 kg
Asian Championships
Bronze medal – third place	2013 Delhi	55 kg
Commonwealth Championship
Gold medal – first place	2009 Jalandhar	51 kg
Gold medal – first place	2011 Melbourne	48 kg
- Updated on 18 September 2015

Babita Kumari Phogat (born 20 November 1989) is a former Indian professional wrestler and a politician from the state of Haryana. She is a multiple Commonwealth Games medalist, winning the gold medal in 2014 Commonwealth Games, and silver medals at the 2010 and 2018 Commonwealth Games. When she won the 2014 Commonwealth gold medal, she became the second Indian women wrestler to win a Commonwealth gold in the 55 kg category after her sister Geeta Phogat, who had won it in 2010.

Babita participated in the Rio 2016 Olympics in the 53 kg women's wrestling, though she could not make it to the podium. Earlier, she had won a bronze medal at the 2013 Asian Wrestling Championships tournament in New Delhi, India; and another bronze at the 2012 World Wrestling Championships. Later in 2019, after retiring from sports, Babita Phogat entered politics by joining the Bharatiya Janata Party.

== Personal life and family ==
Babita was born in Balali village of Charkhi Dadri district, Haryana in a family of wrestlers. Her father Mahavir Singh Phogat, is a former wrestler himself and recipient of India's prominent sports honor, the Dronacharya Award. Mahavir Singh started coaching Babita and her elder sister, Geeta Phogat from an early age. Geeta Phogat, went on to win India's first gold medal in women's wrestling at the Commonwealth Games in 2010.

Babita's extended family includes several national and international wrestlers, including cousin Vinesh Phogat who also won gold, in the 48 kg category, at the Commonwealth Games in Glasgow. Her youngest sister, Ritu Phogat, too is an international level wrestler and has won a gold medal at the 2016 Commonwealth Wrestling Championship. Her younger sister, Sangita Phogat is also a wrestler. Babita, along with her sisters and cousins, have contributed to a change in mindset and attitude towards girls and women in home-state Haryana and rest of the nation.

In June 2019, Babita announced her engagement to fellow wrestler Vivek Suhag, whom she later married in November of the same of year. She and her husband welcomed their first child, a baby boy, on January 11, 2021.

== Career ==
=== Early Career (2009 - 2013) ===
==== 2009 Commonwealth Wrestling Championship ====
In the tournament in Jalandhar, Punjab, Babita won the gold medal in the women's freestyle 51 kg category.

==== 2010 Commonwealth Games ====
At the 2010 Commonwealth Games, Babita won the silver medal in the women's freestyle 51 kg category after being defeated by Ifeoma Christi Nwoye of Nigeria in the gold medal match with the score of 0–2, 4–5.

==== 2011 Commonwealth Wrestling Championship ====
In the tournament held in Melbourne, Australia, Babita won the gold medal in the women's freestyle 48 kg category.

==== 2012 World Wrestling Championships ====
In the Round of 16 of the 2012 World Wrestling Championships, Babita faced Hsin-Ju Chiu of Taipei whom she beat 5:0. Her quarter-finals opponent was Risako Kawai of Japan whom she beat 5:0 to qualify for the semi-finals. She lost 1:3 to Jessica Anne Marie MacDonald of Canada in the semi-finals. She was then able to contest for the bronze medal which she won in the women's freestyle 51 kg category by beating Zamira Rakhmanova of Russia 5:0.

==== 2013 Asian Wrestling Championships ====
At the 2013 Asian Wrestling Championships tournament in New Delhi, India, Babita won the bronze medal in the women's freestyle 55 kg category along with Han Kum-ok of North Korea.

=== Prime Career (2014 - 2018) ===
==== 2014 Commonwealth Games (Gold Medal) ====
In the women's freestyle 55 kg category at the 2014 Commonwealth Games, Babita's first opponent in the quarter-finals was Kathryn Marsh of Scotland whom she beat 9–2, 4–0 (classification points 4:1). Her opponent in the semi-finals was Louisa Porogovska of England whom she beat 2–0 (classification points 5:0) – victory by fall (wrestling terminology). In the gold medal bout, she was up against Brittanee Laverdure of Canada whom she beat 5–0, 4–2 (classification points 3:1) to win the gold medal.

==== 2014 Asian Games ====
Babita was not able to repeat her Commonwealth Games feat at the 2014 Asian Games in Incheon, South Korea. In the Round of 16 of the women's freestyle 55 kg category, she faced Srey Mao Dorn of Mongolia whom she beat 5:0. In the quarter-finals, she faced Aiym Abdildina of Kazakhstan whom she beat 3:1. She lost 0:4 to Olympic champion Saori Yoshida of Japan in the semi-finals. She was able to contest for the bronze medal but lost 1:3 to her opponent Xuechun Zhong of China.

==== 2015 Asian Wrestling Championships ====
Babita defeated Abdy Kadyrova Elsa of Kyrgyzstan 10–0 in the quarterfinal of the 2015 Asian Wrestling Championships, after getting the better of Zukhra Mustanova of Uzbekistan by the same margin in the qualification round. Babita failed to enter the final as she lost her semifinal bout to Pak Yong-Mi of North Korea, losing in the last five seconds.

With a chance for a podium finish, Babita lost to Zhuldyz Eshimova-Turtbayeva of Kazakhstan 3–6 in the bronze medal play-off.

==== 2016 Rio Olympics ====
Babita became the third and final entry from India in the women's wrestling for the 2016 Summer Olympics in Rio de Janeiro. She represented India along with her cousin Vinesh Phogat. She qualified for the Rio Games after her opponent failed a doping test in the qualifying tournament and the quota was given to India. In the first round, Babita, who was competing in the women's 53 kg class, faced Maria Prevolaraki of Greece, who displayed a tight defense gaining points in both the three-minute periods, wherein 26-year-old Babita initially got a leg hold on her rival, but eventually lost the match 1–5, bowing out of Olympics.

==== 2018 Gold Coast Commonwealth Games ====
Babita Kumari Phogat won the silver medal in women's;53 kg freestyle wrestling at 2018 Commonwealth Games in Gold Coast.

== Popular culture ==
The film Dangal, which was released in 2016, is loosely based on the story of her and her elder sister, Geeta Phogat. Babita was portrayed by Sanya Malhotra and her younger self by Suhani Bhatnagar.

== Politics ==
In August 2019, she joined the Bharatiya Janata Party after expressing support for Prime Minister Narendra Modi and his policies for sports promotion. She lost to Sombir Sangwan in October 2019 in Haryana assembly elections from Dadri (Haryana Vidhan Sabha constituency).

== Filmography ==
=== Television ===
Year	Title	Role	Notes
2019	Nach Baliye	Contestant	place-12
2022	Lock Upp	Contestant	Locked out (Day 21)

== Other titles ==
- Dave Schultz Memorial Tournament, 2010 – Sixth place
- Dave Schultz Memorial Tournament, 2012 – Bronze
- Dave Schultz Memorial Tournament, 2014 – Silver

== See also ==
- Geeta Phogat
