= Phogat sisters =

Family of female wrestlers

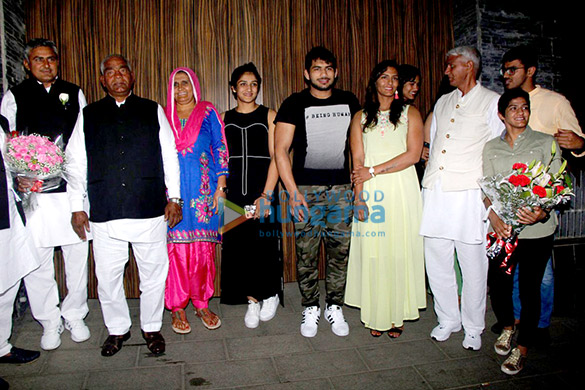
- Phogat family in 2017
- Current region: Charki Dadri, Haryana, India
- Origin: Haryana, India
- Members: Geeta Phogat; Babita Kumari; Priyanka Phogat; Ritu Phogat; Vinesh Phogat; Sangeeta Phogat
- Connected members: Mahavir Singh Phogat (father)
- Traditions: Hindu

The Phogat sisters are six sisters from Haryana, India, all of whom are wrestlers. In order of their birth, they are Geeta, Babita, Priyanka, Ritu, Vinesh, and Sangeeta. Geeta, Babita, Ritu, and Sangeeta are daughters of former wrestler and coach Mahavir Singh Phogat. Priyanka and Vinesh were brought up by Mahavir after their father (and Mahavir's younger brother), Rajpal Phogat, died when they were young. Mahavir trained all six of them in wrestling in their home village of Balali in Bhiwani district.

Three of the Phogat sisters, Geeta, Babita, and Vinesh, are gold medalists in different weight categories at the Commonwealth Games, while Priyanka has won a silver medal at the Asian Championships. Ritu is a National Championships gold medalist and Sangita has won medals at age-level international championships.

The success of the Phogat sisters has attracted substantial media attention, particularly in light of prevalent social issues in Haryana such as gender inequality, female foeticide, and child marriage. Chandgi Ram's daughters, Sonika and Deepika, sowed the seeds of encouraging girls to take up women's wrestling in the 1990s; his protege Mahavir Phogat's daughters revolutionised wrestling, and then Sakshi Malik won an Olympic medal, which led to a big change in the mentality towards women wrestling.

== Background ==
Mahavir Singh Phogat is a former wrestler from Balali village in Bhiwani district, Haryana, who became a wrestling coach. His father Man Singh was also a wrestler. Mahavir and his wife Daya Kaur have five children: daughters Geeta, Babita, Ritu, and Sangita, and the youngest being son Dushyant. Mahavir's brother Rajpal's daughters Priyanka and Vinesh were brought up by Mahavir after the death of their father. Phogat family belongs to the Jat community.

Mahavir was inspired to train his daughters in wrestling when weightlifter Karnam Malleswari became the first Indian woman to win an Olympic medal in 2000. He was also influenced by his coach Chandgi Ram, who had taught wrestling to his own daughters. Kaur recollects, "I told my husband not to push the girls into the sport. I was worried about how they will ever get married as pehelwans wearing shorts and cutting their hair!" Regarding the opposition by the villagers against training his daughters, Mahavir said, "Everyone said I was bringing shame to our village by training my girls, but I thought, if a woman can be Prime Minister of a country, why can't she be a wrestler?" Deprived of proper facilities in his village where his daughters wrestled against boys, Mahavir enrolled Geeta and Babita into the Sports Authority of India center in Sonipat.

== Details ==
Name	Date of Birth	Weight class
Geeta Phogat	15 December 1988 (age 37)	62 kg
Babita Kumari	20 November 1989 (age 36)	52 kg
Priyanka Phogat	12 May 1993 (age 33)	55 kg
Ritu Phogat	2 May 1994 (age 32)	48 kg
Vinesh Phogat	25 August 1994 (age 32)	53 kg
Sangeeta Phogat	5 March 1998 (age 28)	55 kg

== In popular culture ==
The Bollywood film Dangal, released in India on 23 December 2016, is based on the lives of Phogat sisters Geeta and Babita. Wrestler Pooja Dhanda was screened and originally selected to play the role of Babita Phogat in Dangal, which she could not play due to an injury.
