= Geeta Phogat =

Indian freestyle wrestler (born 1988)

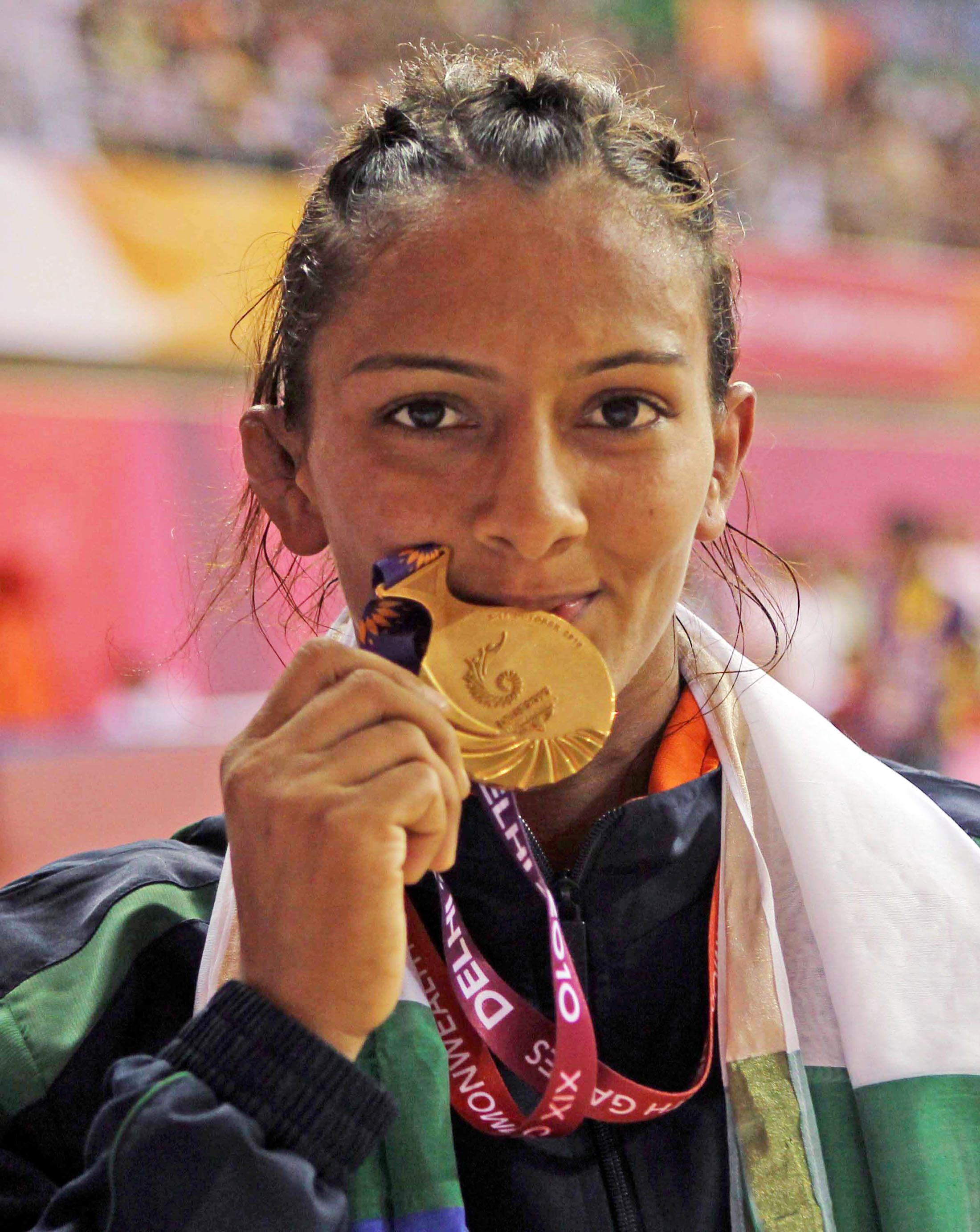
- Phogat with Gold Medal in 2010 Commonwealth Games, Delhi

Personal information
- Full name: Geeta Kumari Phogat
- Nationality: (India) Indian
- Born: Geeta; 15 December 1988 (age 37) Balali, Haryana, India
- Height: 5 ft 0 in (152 cm)
- Weight: 62 kg (137 lb)
- Spouse: Pawan Kumar (m. 2016)

Sport
- Country: India
- Sport: Wrestling
- Event: Freestyle wrestling
- Coached by: Mahavir Singh Phogat
Medal record
Representing India
World Championships
Bronze medal – third place	2012 Strathcona County	55 kg
Commonwealth Games
Gold medal – first place	2010 Delhi	55 kg
Asian Championships
Bronze medal – third place	2012 Gumi	55 kg
Bronze medal – third place	2015 Doha	58 kg
Commonwealth Championship
Gold medal – first place	2009 Jalandhar	55 kg
Gold medal – first place	2011 Melbourne	55 kg
Silver medal – second place	2013 Johannesburg	59 kg
FILA Asian Olympic Qualification Tournament
Gold medal – first place	2012 Astana	55 kg
- Updated on 20 October 2016

Geeta Phogat (born 15 December 1988) is a freestyle wrestler who won India's first-ever gold medal in women's wrestling at the Commonwealth Games in 2010. She was also the first Indian female wrestler to have qualified for the Olympic Games.

== Personal life and family ==
Geeta Phogat was born in Balali village of Charkhi Dadri district, Haryana. Her father Mahavir Singh Phogat, a former wrestler himself and a Dronacharya Award recipient, is also her coach.

Her sister Babita Kumari and cousin Vinesh Phogat are also Commonwealth Games gold medalists. Both won gold medals in their respective categories in 2014 edition of Commonwealth Games. Another younger sister of Geeta Phogat, Ritu Phogat, too is an international level wrestler and has won a gold medal at the 2016 Commonwealth Wrestling Championship. Her youngest sister, Sangita Phogat is also a wrestler.

She married fellow wrestler Pawan Kumar on 20 November 2016. The couple had their first child, a boy Arjun Saroha, on 24 December 2019.

Phogat was a contestant in Khatron Ke Khiladi 8, but was eliminated, securing ninth position.She was also a contestant in Pati Patni Aur Panga – Jodiyon Ka Reality Check with her husband Pawan Kumar, show on Colors TV.

== Career ==
=== 2009 Commonwealth Wrestling Championship ===
Phogat won the gold medal at the Commonwealth Wrestling Championship held in Jalandhar, Punjab between 19 and 21 December 2009.

=== 2010 Commonwealth Games ===
She won India's first ever gold medal in women's wrestling at the Commonwealth Games held in New Delhi, beating Emily Bensted from Australia in the gold medal match with a score of 1–0, 7–0.

=== 2012 Summer Olympics ===
Phogat won a gold medal in the Wrestling FILA Asian Olympic Qualification Tournament that concluded at Almaty, Kazakhstan in April 2012. She has undergone rigorous training at the Netaji Subhas National Institute of Sports, (NSNIS), Patiala, under the guidance of chief coach O.P. Yadav and foreign expert Ryan Dobo.

Phogat was beaten in her opening fight by Canadian Tonya Verbeek (1–3). She received a chance to win the bronze medal since the Canadian went to the finals. In the repechage round, she lost her first match to Lazareva from Ukraine.

=== 2012 World Wrestling Championships ===
In the 2012 World Wrestling Championships held in Canada, Phogat won the bronze medal.

In the first round, Phogat faced Maria Gurova of Russia, beating her 3:1. The second round brought a 5:0 loss for Phogat against Saori Yoshida of Japan. With the Japanese grappler making the finals, Phogat contested in the repechage round, first against Akziya Dautbayeva of Kazakhstan whom she beat 3:1 and then winning the bronze medal bout 3:0 against Natalya Sinishin of Ukraine.

=== 2012 Asian Wrestling Championships ===
In the first round of the 2012 Asian Wrestling Championships, Phogat lost to her Japanese opponent Kanako Murata in a 5:0 scoreline. With the Japanese grappler entering the finals, Phogat was able to contest in the bronze medal round and won the bronze medal in the 55 kg beating Sumiya Erdenechimeg from Mongolia 3:1.

=== 2013 Commonwealth Wrestling Championships ===
At the tournament held in Johannesburg, South Africa, Phogat finished second and won the silver medal in the women's freestyle 59 kg category after losing the final bout to Oluwafunmilayo Adeniyi of Nigeria.

=== 2015 Asian Wrestling Championships ===
At the 2015 Asian Wrestling Championships in Doha, Phogat finished third, winning the bronze medal in the freestyle 58 kg category along with Aiym Abdildina of Kazakhstan. At the 2015 World Championships in Las Vegas, she was drawn against nine-time world Champion, the Japanese Kaori Icho, and lost to her in the opening round 0–10. With Icho qualifying for the finals, Phogat was given a chance to contest in the repechage for the bronze medal. She again lost 0–10 to her opponent, Elif Jale Yeşilırmak of Turkey.

== Popular culture ==
Aamir Khan's film Dangal is loosely based on Geeta Phogat and her sisters lives. Her role in the movie is played by Fatima Sana Shaikh and her younger self is played by Zaira Wasim. Wrestler Pooja Dhanda was screened and selected to play the role of Babita Phogat in this movie, which she could not play due to an injury, and later she went on to defeat senior Phogat sister Geeta Phogat in the real life national championship.

== Other titles and Awards ==
- Arjuna award, 2012
- Dave Schultz Memorial Tournament, 2013 – Silver
- Dave Schultz Memorial Tournament, 2014 – Bronze

== Television ==
Year	Title	Role	Notes
2017	Khatron Ke Khiladi 8	Contestant	9th place
2025	Pati Patni Aur Panga	Contestant	2nd Runner-up
