= Badhra tehsil =

Badhra
- Village
- Location in Haryana, India Badhra (India)
- Coordinates: 28.509°N 75.937°E
- Country: India
- State: Haryana
- District: Bhiwani
- Tehsil: Badhra

Government
  - Body: Village panchayat

Population (2011)
  - Total: 6,333

Languages
  - Official: Hindi
- Time zone: UTC+5:30 (IST)

Badhra Sub-division is one of the sub-district and a potential future district in Bhiwani district of Haryana state in northern India.

== Overview ==
Badhra is one of the 6 Vidhan Sabha constituencies located in Bhiwani district.

== Members of Legislative Assembly ==
Badhra is the seat of Badhra (Haryana Assembly constituency).

- 2014: Sukhvinder Singh, Bhartiya Janta Party

== See also ==
- Bhiwani
