= Badhra =

- township
- Location in Haryana, India Badhra (India)
- Coordinates: 28.509°N 75.937°E
- Country: India
- State: Haryana
- District: Charki Dadri
- Tehsil: Badhra

Government
  - Body: Village panchayat

Population (2011)
  - Total: 6,333

Languages
  - Official: Hindi, English
  - Regional: Bagri language
- Time zone: UTC+5:30 (IST)

Badhra is a tehsil, sub-division and assembly constituency in the Charkhi Dadri district of the Indian state of Haryana. It is located 37 kilometres (23 mi) west of district headquarters Charkhi Dadri, 44 kilometres (27 mi) south west of city of Bhiwani and 145 kilometres (90 mi) east of the national capital Delhi. As of the 2011 Census of India, the tehsil had 22,407 households with a total population of 118,084 of which 62,791 were male and 55,293 female.

== Notable people ==
- Ravi Kumar Punia, a well-known football player, hails from Jewali, a village located in Badhra

== Representation ==
As of the 2024 assembly constituency elections, Badhra is represented by Umed Singh of Bhartiya Janata Party (BJP).

== Education ==
- Govt. College For Women, Badhra

Govt college Mandhi Hariya http://gcmandihariya.ac.in/

== See also ==
- Badhra (Haryana Assembly constituency)
- Badhra sub-district
- Badhra
