= Charkhi Dadri district =

- District of Haryana
- Location in Haryana
- Country: India
- State: Haryana
- Headquarters: Charkhi Dadri

Area
  - Total: 1,346 km^{2} (520 sq mi)

Population (2011)
  - Total: 502,276
  - Density: 373.2/km^{2} (966.5/sq mi)
- Time zone: UTC+05:30 (IST)
- Vidhan Sabha constituencies: 2

Charkhi Dadri district is one of the 23 districts of Haryana state in north west India near Rajasthan border, but not sharing border with Rajasthan. Created on 1 December 2016, the district headquarters is the city of Charkhi Dadri.

== History ==
=== British colonial era ===
During British Raj, Charkhi Dadri was a princely state with an area of 575sq miles and revenue of Rs 103,000 annually. In Indian Rebellion of 1857, the Nawab of Dadri, Bahadur Jung Khan who had given token allegiance to Mughal emperor Bahadur Shah Zafar, surrendered to British and tried by military court martial in Delhi on 27 November 1857. He was removed to Lahore. Dadri was awarded to Raja Swarup Singh of Jind State of the Phulkian dynasty for his services to British East India Company in the 1857 war.

In May 1874, fifty villages revolted against his descendant Raja Raghubir Singh Jind but the rebellion was crushed with force. Three principal villages which took part in the rebellion, Charkhi, Mankawas and Jhojhu, were burned down as a result.

=== Formation of district ===
Previously in Bhiwani district, Charkhi Dadri became part of the new Charkhi Dadri district in 2016. The Government of Haryana state officially notified Charkhi Dadri as 22nd district of Haryana on 16 November 2016. It was established on 1 December 2016.

== Administrative divisions ==
As of December 2018, it has 2 sub-divisions (Charkhi Dadri and Badhra), 2 tehsils (Charkhi Dadri and Badhra) and one sub-tehsil (Baund Kalan).

== Demographics ==
Religion in Charkhi Dadri district (2011)
Religion	Percent
Hinduism	98.47%
Islam	1.25%
Other or not stated	0.28%

As of the 2011 census, the district had a population of 502,276 of which 265,949 were male and 236,327 were female. 11.22% of the population lived in urban areas. Scheduled Castes were 89,426 (17.80%) of the district's population.

=== Languages ===
Languages of Charkhi Dadri district (2011)
1. Haryanvi (90.0%)
2. Hindi (8.72%)
3. Others (1.25%)

At the time of the 2011 census, 90.03% of the population spoke Haryanvi and 8.72% Hindi as their first language.

== Notable individuals ==
- Chandrawati, first woman MP from Haryana
- Phogat sisters: Geeta Phogat, Babita Kumari, Priyanka Phogat, Ritu Phogat, Vinesh Phogat and Sangeeta Phogat, all trained by Mahavir Singh Phogat (father)
- Hukam Singh, former Chief Minister of Haryana
- Hawa Singh, boxer and honorary captain in the Indian Army.
- Ravi Kumar Punia- Football Player
- Sujeet Kalkal-Wrestler, 2026 Asian Games Gold medalist.

== 1996 Charkhi Dadri Mid Air Collision ==
On 12 November, 1996, Saudia Flight 763 departed Delhi at 18:32 local time (13:02 UTC). Kazakhstan Airlines Flight 1907 was descending simultaneously to land at Delhi.[8] Both flights were controlled by approach controller V.K. Dutta.[9] Immediately after take-off, the Saudia flight was cleared to an initial altitude of 10,000 feet (3,050 m). At 18:34, Dutta cleared the Kazakh plane to descend to 15,000 feet (4,550 m) when it was 74 nautical miles (137 km) from the beacon of the destination airport. Two minutes later, at 18:36, Dutta cleared the Saudia plane, travelling on the same airway but in the opposite direction, to climb to 14,000 feet (4,250 m). At 18:38, the SVA crew reported reaching 14,000 feet and requested a higher level. Dutta told them to hold their altitude and standby, to which First Officer Khan replied, "Saudi 763 will maintain one four zero."[9]

At 18:39, the Kazakh flight reported having reached its assigned altitude of 15,000 feet, but it was actually higher, at 16,348 feet (5,000 m), and still descending.[14][9] At this time, Dutta advised the flight, "Identified traffic 12 O'Clock, reciprocal, Saudia Boeing 747 at ten miles, likely to cross in another five miles. Report, if in sight."[9] Radio Operator Repp requested clarification, to which Dutta replied, "Traffic ... is at eight miles, level 140."[9] Repp acknowledged the update, and signed off with, "Now looking 1907."[9]

Less than a minute later, at 18:40, the crew of a United States Air Force cargo flight made a radio call saying they had seen "a big explosion" at their two o'clock position.[9] Dutta attempted to contact the Saudia and Kazakh flights but received no response. The two aircraft had collided, with the left wing of the Kazakh flight slicing through the left wing of the Saudia 747 while the left horizontal stabilizer of the 747 sliced off the vertical stabilizer (including the horizontal stabilizer) of the Kazakh flight. The crippled Saudi Boeing immediately lost control and went into a rapidly descending spiral with fire trailing from the wing and broke up mid-air before crashing to the ground at a nearly supersonic speed of 1,135 km/h (613 kn; 705 mph). With most of its left wing and vertical stabilizer gone, the Ilyushin went into a flat spin and crashed into a field at a flat attitude near the wreckage of the Saudia plane. All 312 people on board SVA763 and all 37 people on Flight 1907 were killed.[15]

The recorder of the Saudi Arabian plane revealed the pilots said the Islamic Istighfar (forgiveness prayer) and recited the Shahada before impact with the ground.[9]

The collision took place about 100 kilometres (60 mi) west of Delhi.[16] The wreckage of the Saudi Arabian aircraft landed near Dhani village, Bhiwani District(now Charkhi Dadri), Haryana. The wreckage of the Kazakh aircraft hit the ground near Birohar village, Rohtak District, Haryana.[13]

== See also ==
- Bhiwani district
- Changrod
- List of districts of Haryana

== Links ==
- https://charkhidadri.gov.in/district-profile/
- Official website
- Tribune India, accessed 8 Jan 2017
- Times of India, accessed 8 Jan 2017
- Times of India, accessed 8 Jan 2017
