= Charkhi Dadri =

- City
- Location in Haryana, India Charkhi Dadri (India)
- Coordinates: 28.59°N 76.27°E
- Country: India
- State: Haryana
- District: Charkhi Dadri
- Established: 2016

Government
  - Type: Municipal Council
  - Body: Charkhi Dadri Municipal Council

Population
  - Total: 44,892

Languages
  - Official: Hindi
  - Spoken: Haryanvi (Bangru and Ahirwati), Hindi
- Time zone: UTC+5:30 (IST)
- PIN: 127306
- Telephone code: 01250
- ISO 3166 code: IN-HR
- Vehicle registration: HR-19, HR-84
- Nearest city: Kosli, Bhiwani, Rohtak
- Sex ratio: 54:46 ♂/♀
- Literacy: 70%
- Vidhan Sabha constituency: Dadri (Haryana Vidhan Sabha constituency)
- Climate: Dry (Köppen)
- Website: charkhidadri.gov.in

Charkhi Dadri is a city and the headquarters of Charkhi Dadri district in the Indian state of Haryana, about 90 km from the national capital Delhi. The town was made by joining the villages of Charkhi and Dadri after urban development. Charkhi Dadri is on NH 148B between Narnaul to Bathinda and NH 348B between Meerut to Pilani segment passing through the city.

== Etymology ==
"Dadri" is derived from a lake called Dadur which was full of dadur (Sanskrit: frog) from which it took its current name. To distinguish Dadri from other similarly named places in the area, sometimes Dadri's name was appended to the nearby village of Charkhi. After India became independent, in recognition of the contribution of people of Charki village during the first war of independence in 1857 against the British colonial rule and Praja Mandala movement against the oppressive rule of the Jind State, the government officially named the town as Charkhi-Dadri.

When Ramkrishna Dalmia, the founder of Dalmia Group, established a cement factory at Dadri during the rule of Jind State, the town was renamed as "Dalmia Dadri" on request of Sir Ganga Ram Kaul who was then Chief Minister of Jind State, which was renamed to "Charkhi Dadri" when Jind State was merged with Patiala and East Punjab States Union (PEPSU) in 1948.

== History ==
=== Chalcolithic Era ===
Archaeological excavations and explorations conducted so far in the district have revealed that this region was first inhabited by the Chalcolithic agricultural communities as early as 2400 B.C. These early settlers of this area, known as Sothians lived at Mitathal, Chang, Tigrana, Dadri, Manheru, Mishri, Jhinjar and Talu in small mud-brick houses with thatched roofs, comprising about 50 to 100 houses each.

=== Early history ===
The town was founded around the 12th century by Bilhan Singh Lamba.[citation needed]

According to the oral tradition, he saw a cow and lion drinking water side by side at dadur lake. Intrigued by the sight, he went to a nearby cottage where a Mahatma named Swami Dayal lived. Bilhan Singh sought Mahatma's blessings and was told that if he made the place his home, his family would be blessed and would rule over it in the future.

=== Mughal era ===
Mughal emperors Akbar and Farrukhsiyar both issued firmans (housed in Red Fort Archaeological Museum and "Rao Harnarian Singh Dhan Collection of Charkhi Dadri" respectively) to grant land to zamindars as "madad-i-mash" (subsistence allowance). Rao Dhan Singh, Brahman took part in the revolt of 1857 and fought bravely in the Battle of Narnaul, against British but due to failure of revolt lost their jagirdari included many villages to British.

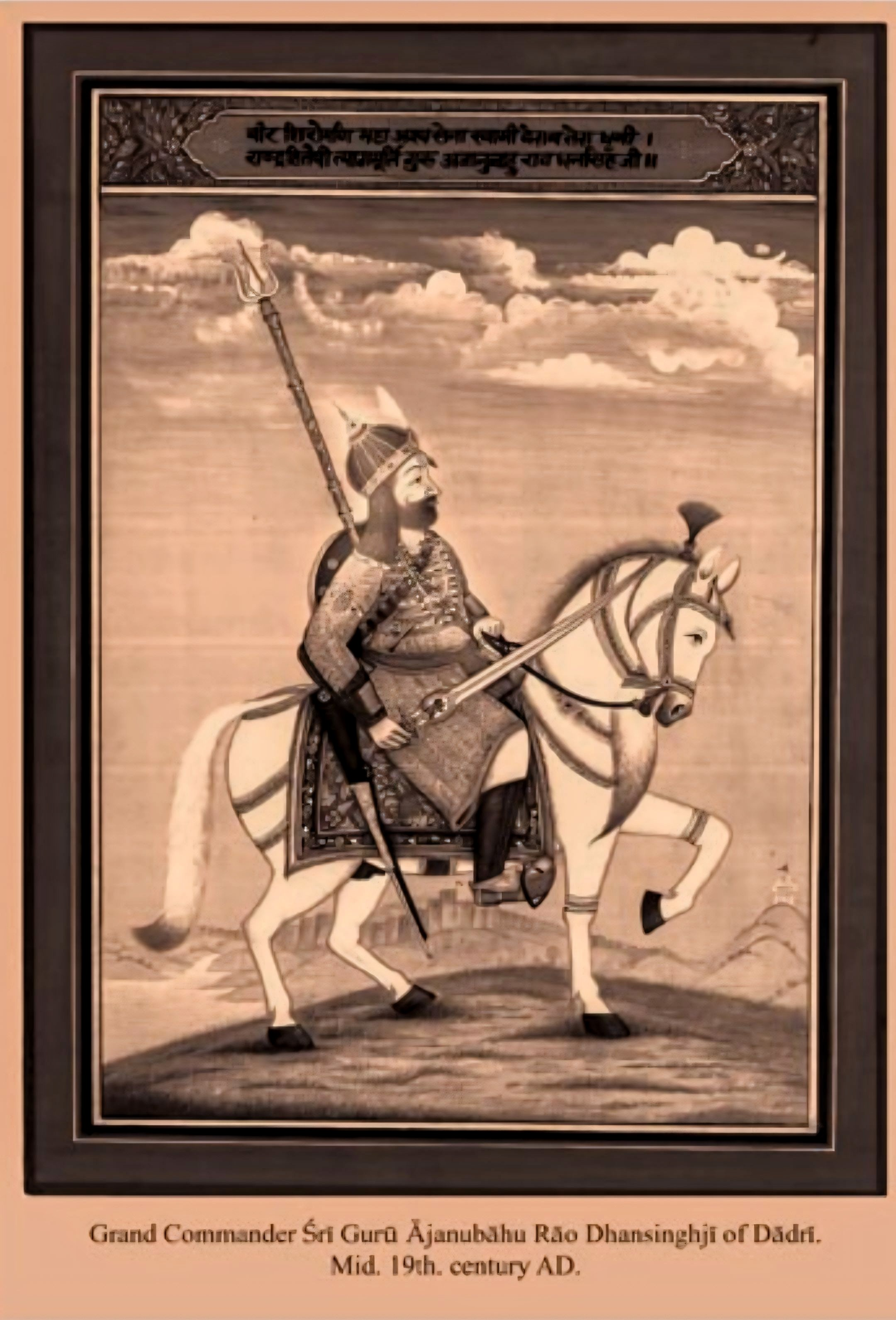

=== British colonial era ===
In 1806, the British Raj gave Charkhi Dadri to the Nawab of Jhajjhar, the ruler of the princely state of Jhajjhar, who then stayed in power till 1857. The Charkhi Dadri tract had an area of 575 sq. miles and revenue of Rs 1,03,000 annually. In the 1857 war, the Nawab of Dadri, Bahadur Jung Khan, who had given token allegiance to Emperor ˞BahadurShah Zafar, surrendered to British and was tried by military court-martial in Delhi on 27 November 1857. He was removed to Lahore. Dadri was awarded to Raja Sarup Singh of Jind for his services to the East India Company (EIC) in the 1857 war. In May 1864, some fifty Sangwan Jat villages revolted against his descendant, Raja Raghbir Singh, but the rebellion was crushed. Three principal villages which took part in the rebellion, Charkhi, Mankawas and Jhojhu, were burned down. Notable Sanskrit, Arabic and Persian scholars lived here, as evident by the collection of Sanskrit and Persian manuscripts possessed by Rao Uttam Singh, a teacher to the King of Jind State.

=== 1996 mid-air collision ===
Charkhi Dadri came to media attention when, on 12 November 1996, a Kazakhstan Airlines Ilyushin Il-76 struck a Saudia Boeing 747 in the sky above the village, causing both aircraft to crash into the fields below. The collision resulted in the deaths of all 349 people on board both aircraft. It was the deadliest mid-air collision on record, the deadliest aviation disaster that left no survivors, the deadliest aviation disaster in India, as well as the third-deadliest aviation disaster of all time behind Japan Air Lines Flight 123 and the Tenerife airport disaster (but excluding the September 11 attacks).

=== Formation of district ===
Previously in Bhiwani district, Charkhi Dadri became part of the new Charkhi Dadri district in 2016. According hssc 16 Nov 2016

=== Historic monuments ===
There are some historic places in the city which include Shyamesar Lake and Dayal Temple to name a few.

Baba Shami Dayal Samadhi and temple:
Most ancient monument in the town is the Samadhi of Baba Shami Dayal, who is Jathera (also called Dhok) of Phogat gotra of Jats, holds an annual fair on 8th day of Bhado month of Hindu Vikram Samvat calendar.

Shyamesar lake:
In 1687 CE during Aurangzeb rule, Lala Sita Ram built the Shyamesar lake at the cost of Rs. 100,000. Lala was also mentioned as the treasurer of Mughal emperor Muhammad Shah (r. 1719-48) in the "1904 Phulkian States Gazetteer".

Dadri Palace :
After 1857 war of independence, Dadri was granted to the Jat Sikh king of Jind State, who built a palace here for his daughter.

Charkhi Dadri Fort:
In the first half of the 19th century the Nawab of Jhajjar built a fort here which is currently occupied by various government offices. In the second half of 19th century the Jind State built the "Dorothy villa" which is currently being used as the "PWD Rest House".
Dada Ramser Mandir:
This picturesque Khatu Shyam temple is situated between Aravali hills (Shyam hills) of Badrai and Nauranga Bass Jattan villages . Lord Khatu Shyam ( Barbarik) said to have visited and stayed here while going to take part in the battle of Mahabharta.

== Demographics ==
As of the 2001 India census, Charkhi Dadri had a population of 44,892. Males constitute 54% of the population and females 46%. Charkhi Dadri has an average literacy rate of 70%, higher than the national average of 59.5%, with male literacy of 76% and female literacy of 62%. 13% of the population is under 6 years of age.

The major part of the ethnographic spectrum of the population is constituted by Jat people who have come from various neighbouring villages. Next are Ahir who lived here surrounding village from Mahabharat times called Abhira people . Another major community belongs to Bania (caste), Punjabi who live in clusters in the areas of Subhash Chowk, Kath Mandi, Pahwa Chowk and Ladhan Paana, are also found in great numbers. Saini lives in the majority in Saini Pura, Jhajjar Ghati, Bir Bhairvi earlier known as "Gwadiwala Johar founded by late Nathu Ram Saini under the Peepal tree, age of peepal tree is more than 100 years and now alive and Brahmin who lives majorly in the concentrated pockets of the old city called Chotti Bazari and places around Anaj mandi. Nevertheless, the city is a perfect melange with people from other diverse castes and communities as well."

People of many gotras live in Charkhi Dadri, the major ones being Affriya, Dagar, Sultaniya, Lamba, Saini, Sangwan, Sansanwal, Rajotiya, Mahla, Kalkal, Prajapati, Dhangad and Sheoran.

== Economy ==
Charkhi Dadri is the main marketplace for all the surrounding villages and has its own food and grain markets and one Food Corporation of India (FCI) godown. It has many shopping institutions such as the main market and Hira Chowk. Various motor vehicle showrooms are also present here. All this makes Charkhi Dadri a big market for shopping. LOCAL CART app Head Office is located in Charkhi Dadri.

=== Cement plant ===
Cement Corporation of India established one of its cement plants in Haryana. The plant was commissioned in 1982 with an installed capacity of 174,000 tonnes per annum. The process used in the plant was a semi-dry one. The plant is spread across 198 acres (0.80 km^{2}). It functioned for almost 15 years before production was stopped in 1996.

== Politics ==
Chandrawati, Ganpat Rai - Ex-MLA, Hargain Singh Gochwal, Hukam Singh (master) - late Ex-Chief Minister, Kripa Ram Phogat (late) - head of first labour union of Delhi Transport Corporation, Ram Kishan Gupta (late) - Ex-MP and educationalist, are a few prominent politicians. Wrestler Babita Phogat fought the assembly elections from this seat and lost to an independent candidate in 2019. She is a prominent current politician from this area.

== Educational institutions ==
Late Ram Kishan Gupta, then a former parliamentarian founded the Dadri Education Society. There are several educational institutions, including Murari Lal Rasiwasiya Ayurvedic College (MLRAC), KAIM (Kedarnath Aggarwal Institute of Management), and JVMGRR Institute of Computer Applications, in Charkhi Dadri. There are also Apeejay School, DRK Adarsh Vidya Mandir, RED School, Vaish Senior Secondary School, Geeta Niketan and Geetanjali.

== Notable people ==
- Geeta Phogat - wrestler
- Master Hukam Singh Former CM of Haryana
- Babita Kumari Phogat- wrestler
- Sharad Saini
- Vinesh Phogat- wrestler
- Ravi Kumar Punia- Football player
