= Samaspur Majra =

Samaspur Majra Samaspur Majra, Jhajjar
- Village
- Location in Haryana, India Samaspur Majra (India)
- Country: India
- State: Haryana
- Region: North India
- District: Jhajjar

Languages
  - Official: Hindi
- Time zone: UTC+5:30 (IST)
- PIN: 124109
- ISO 3166 code: IN-HR
- Vehicle registration: HR-14
- Website: haryana.gov.in

Samaspur Majra is a large village located in Jhajjar district in the Indian state of Haryana.

== Demographics ==
In 2011, The Kasni village has population of 2370 of which 1301 are males while 1069 are females.

== Religion ==
Majority of the residents are Hindu and belongs to Jaat community of Dhankhar gotra.

== See also ==
- Sarola
- Girdharpur, Jhajjar
- Khudan
- Chhapar, Jhajjar
- Dhakla, Jhajjar
