= Kasni, Jhajjar =

Kasni Kasni, Jhajjar
- Village
- Location in Haryana, India Kasni (India)
- Country: India
- State: Haryana
- Region: North India
- District: Jhajjar

Languages
  - Official: Hindi
- Time zone: UTC+5:30 (IST)
- PIN: 124109
- ISO 3166 code: IN-HR
- Vehicle registration: HR-14
- Website: haryana.gov.in

Kasni is a large village located in Jhajjar district in the Indian state of Haryana.

== Demographics ==
In 2011, The Kasni village has population of 4034 of which 2177 are males while 1857 are females.Kasni is a village in Jhajjar district of Haryana, India, where people from different communities reside, with a significant presence of the Jat community, particularly the Dhankhar gotra. Agriculture is an important part of the local economy, and a considerable number of residents and families are associated with the Indian Armed Forces, making farming and military service prominent aspects of the village's social and economic life. Various political parties are active in Kasni, including the Bharatiya Janata Party (BJP), Indian National Lok Dal (INLD), and Indian National Congress (INC). The village is also associated with wrestling, with internationally recognised wrestler Parveen alias Bhola Kasni being among the notable wrestlers connected with the village. In public and political life, Ombir Dhankhar Kasni has been associated with the Indian National Lok Dal and has served as the Halka President of the Badli constituency, as well as Pradesh Secretary of the Rashtriya Jat Mahasabha, Haryana Pradesh. Shamsher Dhankhar is associated with the Dhankhar Khap and serves as its head, while Deepak Dhankhar is a youth leader associated with the Indian National Congress. Another notable person connected with Kasni is Kanishtha Dhankhar, who won the Pantaloons Femina Miss India World title in 2011 and represented India at Miss World 2011. The village has therefore been associated with agriculture, military service, wrestling, public life, and individuals who have gained recognition at state, national, and international levels.

== Notable people ==
- Akshita Dhankhar, Flight Lieutenant, Indian Air Force.
- Kanishtha Dhankar, Miss India,2011
- Ombir Dhankhar Kasni, President , Indian National Lok Dal, Constituency- Badli-65.. Youth Secretary, Haryana Pardesh, Rashtriya Jat Mahasabha
- Samsher Dhankhar, President ,DHANKHAR KHAP
- Parveen Bhola , International wrestler

== Religion ==
Majority of the residents are Hindu.

== See also ==
- Sarola
- Girdharpur, Jhajjar
- Khudan
- Chhapar, Jhajjar
- Dhakla, Jhajjar
