= Badli, Jhajjar =

Badli Badli Dhansa Badli
- Badli
- Location in Haryana Badli (India)
- Coordinates: 28.572°N 76.810°E
- Country: India
- State: Haryana
- District: Jhajjar

Government
  - Body: Municipality BADLI

Population (2011)
  - Total: 18,477
- Time zone: UTC+5:30 (IST)
- PIN: 124105
- Vehicle registration: HR 89 (private). HR 63 commercial .
- Website: www.jhajjar.nic.in

Badli is a village, of Jhajjar district, Haryana, India, located to the west of the Delhi border. Locally, it is also known as Dhansa-Badli (around 18,000 votes) is one of the 90 assembly constituencies in the Indian state of Haryana with record 132,300 votes in 2024 and is also part of the Rohtak Parliamentary Constituency.

Traditionally, most residents depended on farming, but since 2002, agricultural activity has greatly declined, with only a small area still under cultivation. Much of the village land has been converted to commercial use, mainly through Special Economic Zone (SEZ) projects or for brick kilns (known as "bhatta" industries). Badli serves as a central point among several cities: Gurgaon (25 km), Bahadurgarh (18 km), Farrukhnagar (15 km), Jhajjar (15 km), and Najafgarh/Delhi (18 km). The village is strategically connected by the KMP (Kundli-Manesar-Palwal) Expressway, which links it to major industrial cities in both Delhi and Haryana. The KMP Expressway has enhanced road connectivity for Badli, and Dr. Arvind Sharma (Member of Parliament, Rohtak, 2019-2024) has initiated efforts to connect the village by rail as well. The railway project is currently in the land acquisition stage. The pollution level in Badli is considerably high due to the presence of brick manufacturing units and a lack of sufficient attention from both the state and central governments.

== Notable persons ==
Kuldeep Vats is member of the Haryana Legislative Assembly from the Indian National Congress representing the Badli, Jhajjar Vidhan sabha Constituency in Haryana .

Naresh Sharma former member of the Haryana Legislative Assembly from the Indian National Congress representing the Badli, Jhajjar Vidhan sabha Constituency in Haryana. He is 2 times MLA from Congress party. Now he is in INLD party.

== See also ==
- Sarola
- Subana
- Khudan
- Chhapar, Jhajjar
- Dhakla, Jhajjar
- Machhrauli
