= Babepur, Jhajjar =

Babepur Babepur, Jhajjar
- Village
- Location in Haryana, India Babepur (India)
- Country: India
- State: Haryana
- Region: North India
- District: Jhajjar

Languages
  - Official: Hindi
- Time zone: UTC+5:30 (IST)
- PIN: 124109
- ISO 3166 code: IN-HR
- Vehicle registration: HR-14
- Website: haryana.gov.in

Babepur is a village located in Jhajjar district in the Indian state of Haryana.

== Demographics ==
In 2011, Babepur village has population of 1014 of which 514 are males while 500 are females.

== Religion ==
Majority of the residents are Hindu, with Jats being the dominant social group.

== See also ==
- Sarola
- Subana
- Khudan
- Chhapar, Jhajjar
- Dhakla, Jhajjar
