= Chhara =

- Village
- Location in Haryana, India Chhara (India)
- Country: India
- State: Haryana
- Region: North India
- District: Jhajjar
- Named for: Phalwans and freedom fighters

Population (2011)
  - Total: 12,989

Languages
  - Official: Hindi
- Time zone: UTC+5:30 (IST)
- PIN: 124504
- ISO 3166 code: IN-HR
- Vehicle registration: HR-13
- Website: haryana.gov.in

Chhara is a large village in the Bahadurgarh tehsil of Jhajjar district in the Indian state of Haryana. The population was 12,989 in the 2011 census.

== History ==
The village is historically associated with the sport of wrestling.

== Geography ==
Chhara is located in Bahadurgarh Tehsil of Jhajjar district in Haryana, India, and is one of the largest villages in the state. It is situated on the MDR 122 road between Bahadurgarh and Beri and on the National Highway 334B Loharu to Meerut. The village is situated on a low mountain.

The nearest village is Rewari Khera 3 kilometres (1.9 mi) away, while the village of Bhaproda is 5 kilometres (3.1 mi) away.

Nearest towns and cities include:

- Jhajjar 13 km
- Bahadurgarh 20 km
- Delhi ISBT 51 km
- Chandigarh 265 km
- Rohtak 35km

== Demographics ==
The population of the village was 12,989 in the 2011 census, of whom 7,120 were male and 5,869 female, but reportedly around 15,000 in 2019.

== Education ==
There are five government schools. One ITI and Govt degree college.

== Religion ==
Temples found in the village include Samadh (Dada Bhagwan Dash, Dada Santok Dash, Dada Shyam Smunder Dash), Dada Chman wala dham Chhara To Jhajjar rod, Dada Jti wala dham Girawar rod, Dada Samadh Wala, Hanuman, Shiv, Krishan Ji Mandir, Baba Gorakh Dham and Sarvan Mandir, also called Piliya Johad ("jaundice pond").

== Sports ==
There are five akhara, or wrestling (training halls), and many wrestlers from the village go on to become major names in the sport. Around 40 have represented India at international tournaments, and two were due to take part in the 2020 Olympics (now 2021).

== Notable people ==
=== Hardwari Lal ===
Hardwari Lal remained MLA for a long time, both in Punjab and Haryana, also the Member of Parliament from Rohtak Constituency in 1990–95. He was Education Minister in the cabinet of Rao Birender Singh. He was an educationist and was later appointed as Vice Chancellor of Maharishi Dayanand University, Rohtak.

=== Hoshiyar Singh ===
Hoshiyar Singh was born on 19 February 1920 at Chhara. At the age of 11 left home and joined the Indian independence movement with Mahatma Gandhi for Nations Freedom. He was imprisoned many times during the fight for independence:

- Delhi Central Jail (06-03-1938 to 22-07-1938)
- Lahore Central Jail (15-01-1941 to 16-01-1942)
- Multan central Jail (05-02-1944 to 10-02-1944)
- Multan central Jail (02-06-1944 to 13-06-1945)

On 15 August 1972, prime minister Indira Gandhi honoured him with Tamrapatra for dedicating his life for the cause of Indian independence.

=== Shriom Singh ===
Shriom Singh served in Indian Navy, in his career he proved to be cherished asset to his country. The most notable achievement of his was breaking the record for deepest diving. The record breaking dive took place in February 2011 offshore near Kochi, at the depth of 233 metres.

=== Surender Singh ===
Surender Singh was an Indian politician from the Aam Admi Party from 2013 to 2019 two times MLA from Delhi Cantonment in the Delhi Legislative Assembly.

=== Umrao Singh ===
Village head, pradhan of 60 villages khaap. He was close to Devi Lal (ex Deputy PM) and ex CM Om Prakash Chautala.
