= Nilaheri =

- Nilaheri
- Location within Haryana Location within India
- Coordinates: 28°29′27″N 76°30′59″E
- Country: India
- State: Haryana
- District: Jhajjar
- Tehsil: Salhawas

Government
  - Type: Panchayat
  - Body: Sarpanch ROSHNI DEVI, Year 2022

Population (2011)
  - Total: 2,508
- Postal code: 124146
- STD: 01251
- Vehicle registration: HR-14
- Website: www.nilaheri.com

Nilaheri is a village in Salhawas tehsil, Jhajjar district, Haryana, India, forming a part of Rohtak division. It is 26.6 kilometres (16.5 mi) south of the district headquarters at Jhajjar. Its postal head office is at Salhawas, 8 kilometres (5.0 mi) distant.

== Demographics ==
As of the 2011 India census, Nilaheri had a population of 2508 in 541 households. Males (1261) constitute 50.27% of the population and females (1247) 49.72%. Nilaheri has an average literacy (1756) rate of 70.01%, lower than the national average of 74%: male literacy (1001) is 57%, and female literacy (755) is 42.99% of total literates (1756). In Nilaheri, Jhajjar 15.77% of the population is under 6 years of age (277).

== Facilities ==
Nilheri has a Government Senior Secondary School and a primary school. There are also temples dedicated to

Lord Krishana, Lord Hanumaan and Lord Shiva.

Dada Bhaiya

== Adjacent villages ==
- Bhurawas
- Ladian
- Chandol
- Mundahera
- Kohandrawali
- Bithla
- Dhakla
- Salhawas
- Humayupur
- Birar
- Bhindawas
- Niwada

== Adjacent railway station ==
- Kosli Rewari
