= Rewari Khera =

- Village
- Location in Haryana, India Rewari Khera (India)
- Country: India
- State: Haryana
- Region: North India
- District: Jhajjar

Languages
  - Official: Hindi
- Time zone: UTC+5:30 (IST)
- PIN: 124504
- ISO 3166 code: IN-HR
- Vehicle registration: HR-13
- Website: haryana.gov.in

Rewari Khera is a village in Jhajjar district, Haryana, India.

It is located in the Bahadurgarh mandal of the Jhajjar district of the Haryana state, India. Rewari Khera lies 22.1 km (14 mi) from Bahadurgarh, 11 km (7 mi) from Jhajjar, and 228 km (142 mi) from Chandigarh. As of the 1990 census, it has a population of 7,500. Rewari Khera is connected by a 1 km stretch of road joining Bahadurgarh to Beri via the nearest large village, Chhara. The village has a government primary school as well as Government Senior Secondary School. The earliest eminent educated families of Rewari Khera are the Dalals And Dalal Bhawan location available.

Rewari Khera has temple of Dada Sahnuwala Maharaj, where it is said that everyone's wishes come true. Every year on the first Tuesday after Janmashtami, a cultural programme and bhandara and mela are organised by people of the village.

Rewari khera has second temple of Dada gugan wala this location out of village.

Vikas Dalal Gangster who is a sharp shooter of Manjeet Mahal gang,Delhi also belongs to Rewari khera village.

Dr.Hitesh Dalal s/o Ramesh Kumar Dalal is Dental surgeon - BDS ( Rohtak PGI) is belongs to Rewari khera village.
