= Kinala =

- Village
- Nicknames: Kinal, Hisar
- Location in Haryana, India Kinala (India)
- Coordinates: 29.4621°N 75.8116°E
- Country: India
- State: Haryana
- Region: North India
- District: Hisar

Languages
  - Official: Hindi
- Time zone: UTC+5:30 (IST)
- PIN: 125112
- ISO 3166 code: IN-HR
- Vehicle registration: HR-20
- Website: haryana.gov.in

Kinala is a village in Uklana Tehsil in Hisar District of Haryana State, India

== See also ==
- Hisar
- Sarola
- Khudan
- Chhapar, Jhajjar
- Dhakla, Jhajjar
