= Salhawas =

Salhawas, Jhajjar
- Location within Haryana Location within India
- Coordinates: 28.445313°N 76.556861°E
- Country: India
- State: Haryana
- District: Jhajjar district
- Municipality: Jhajjar

Population (2011)
  - Total: 5,962
- Postal code: 124146
- Area code: 01251
- Vehicle registration: HR
- Website: www.jhajjar.nic.in

Salhawas is a village in Salhawas tehsil, Matanhail subdistrict, Jhajjar district, Haryana, India, in Rohtak division. It is 36 kilometres (22 mi) south of the district headquarters at Jhajjar. It has a postal head office.

== Demographics of 2011 ==
As of 2011 India census, Salhawas had a population of 5962 in 1165 households. Males (3097) constitute 51.94% of the population and females (2865) 48.05%. Salhawas has an average literacy (3942) rate of 66.11%, lower than the national average of 74%: male literacy (2340) is 59.36%, and female literacy (1602) is 40.63% of total literates (3942). In Salhawas, Jhajjar 13.09% of the population is under 6 years of age (781).

== Adjacent villages ==
- Bithla
- Dhakla
- Nilaheri
- Humayupur
- Birar
- Bhindawas
- Niwada
- Amboli
