= George Thomas (soldier) =

- Raja
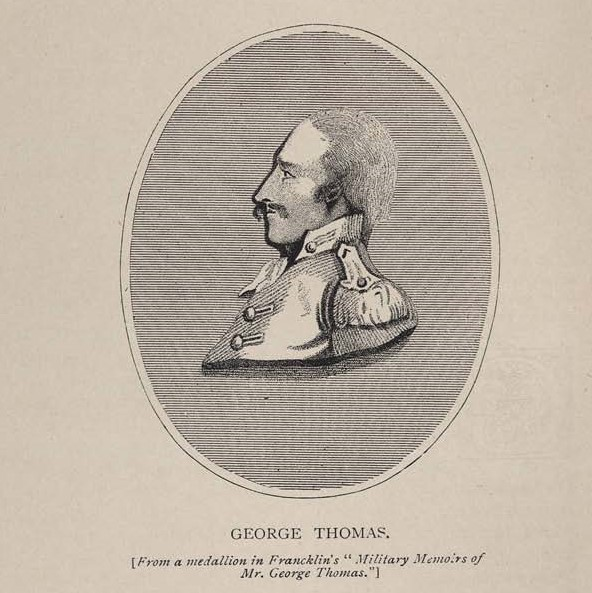

Raja of Hansi
- Reign: 1798–1801
- Predecessor: Gwalior State
- Successor: Gwalior State
- Born: 1756; Roscrea, County Tipperary, Ireland
- Died: 1802 (aged 45–46); Baharampur, Bengal Presidency
- Issue: Alec; Annie
- Religion: Catholic

George Thomas (Irish: Seóirse Ó Tómais; c. 1756 – 22 August 1802), known in India as Jaharai Jung and Jahazi Sahib, was an Irish mercenary and ultimately a Raja who was active in 18th-century India. From 1798 to 1801, he ruled a small kingdom in India, which he carved out of the Hisar and Rohtak districts of Haryana. He is often known in popular memory as the Raja from Tipperary.

== Early life ==
Thomas was born in Roscrea, County Tipperary, the son of a poor Irish Catholic tenant farmer who died when George was a child. He was press-ganged into the Royal Navy at Youghal, County Cork, where he worked as a labourer on the docks. Thomas deserted from the navy at the age of 25 in Madras in 1782. Still illiterate at the age of 32, he led a group of Pindaris north to Delhi by 1787, where he took service under Begum Samru of Sardhana.

Though he was the favourite general of Begum Samru, due to jealous intrigues of his French rival Le Vassoult (committed suicide in 1795) he was supplanted in 1792 in her favour. He then transferred his allegiance to Apa Khande Rao, a Maratha chieftain under Mahadaji Scindia of Gwalior State. He worked for Apa Khande Rao for four years from 1793 to 1797 to conquer Haryana by subduing Rajputs of Rajasthan, Kachwaha Shekhawat Thakur rulers of Haryana and Shekhawati, Mughals under Wazir Mirza Najaf Khan and Bhatti Muslim Rajputs.

In return for service to the Marathas, he was gifted the jagir of Jhajjar. Here he constructed a fort known as Georgegah, which was locally known as Jahazgarh.

== Raja of Hansi ==
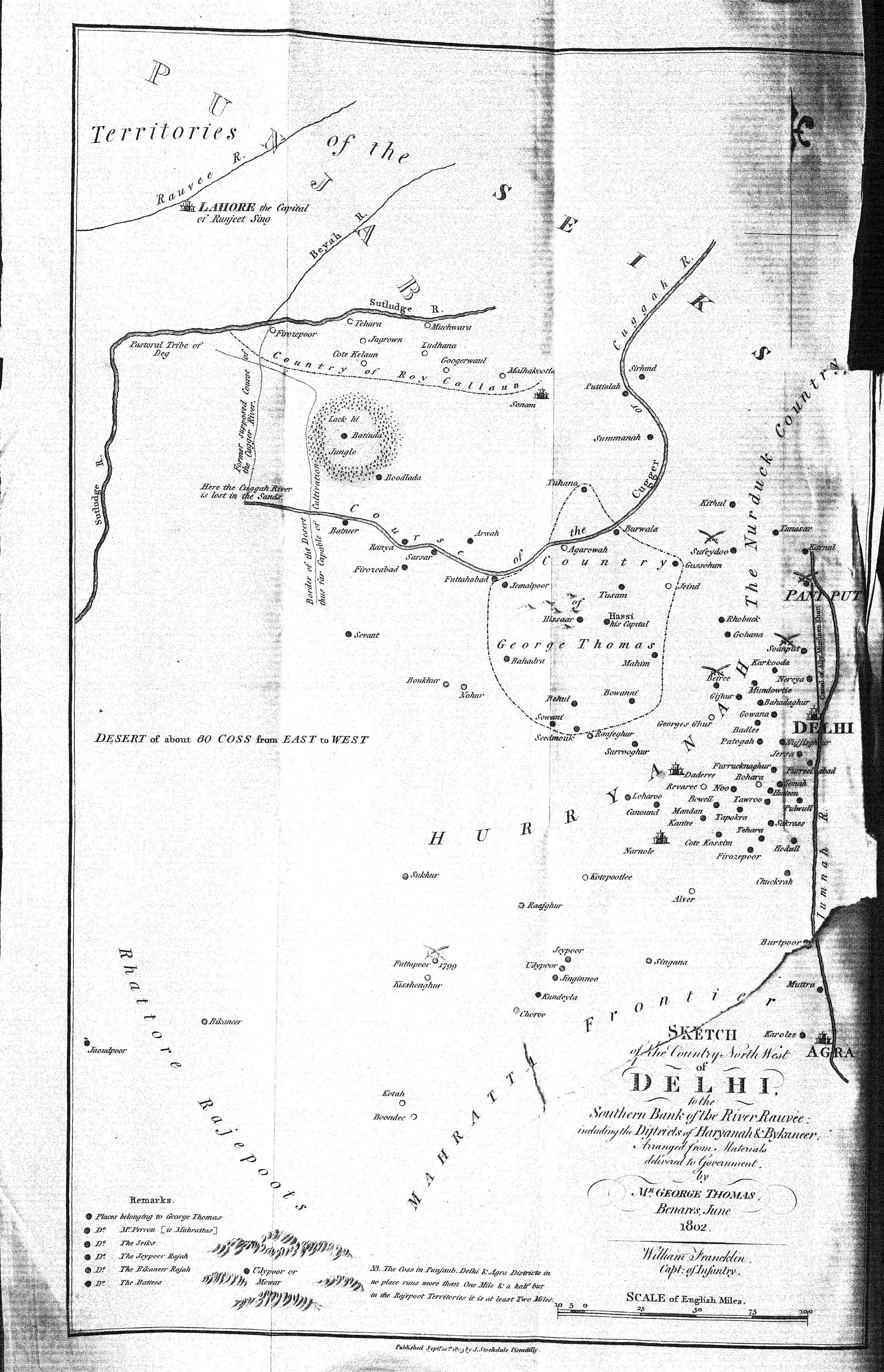
George Thomas' Kingdom, with his Capital at Hansi

On the death of his patron Apa Khande Rao in 1797, Thomas declared independence from the Marathas. He quickly took possession of Rohtak and Hisar and made Hansi his capital. Later that year his requests to the Chiefs of the Phulkian Misl for assistance against the Marathas were rejected. He thereafter launched a campaign against Jind whilst the Phulkian Chief was in Lahore. Despite lifting his siege of Jind, Thomas and his forces were forced to flee from Sikh forces during a night attack, forcing Thomas to sue for peace. The peace only lasted until 1799, when the Phulkian Misl launched further expeditions against neighbouring Jind and Kaithal and decimated portions of Thomas's large army. In January 1800 he invaded Patiala but was repelled by the Sidhu's of Patiala.

During his short period of rule, he established a mint in Hansi and released rupees of his own kingdom. His area of control included area from Ghaggar river in the north to Beri in south and from Meham in the east to Bhadra in west. He rebuilt the Asigarh Fort at Hansi, which was in a ruined state and built defensive walls and fortifications. He divided his area of control into 4 small parganas. Historian Jadunath Sarkar (1870–1958) describes his conquests as "Oval in shape, with ill-defined and ever-shifting frontiers, it extended 13 to 28 miles in different directions. On the north lay the Ghaggar river which separates it from the lands under Sikh occupation; the west the country of predatory Bhatti tribes, beyond which lay the deserts of Bikaner. The south was bounded by the Rewari district." He raised an army of eight battalions of infantry comprising 6000 men, fifty pieces of cannon, 1000 cavalry, including the Jats who made up two battalions of Infantry and one-fourth of his cavalry (paid pensions to them and encouraged them to settle in Haryana, colonisation of land through pensions to sipahis contributed to Haryana becoming a stable military labour market in the 1790s), 1500 Rohilla Muslims and 2000 soldiers guarding his several forts.

He styled himself as the Raja of Hansi and he also liked to introduce himself as Raja from Tipperary. He marched on the kingdoms of Jaipur, Bikaner and Udaipur and was sometimes victorious. George told his biographer, William Francklin, "I established my capital, rebuilt the walls long since decayed, and repaired the fortifications (of the 12th century fort of Prithiviraj Chauhan). As it had been long deserted, at first I found difficulty in providing for inhabitants. But by decrees, I selected between five and six thousand persons to whom I allowed every lawful indulgence. I established a mint and coined my own rupees, which I made current in my army and country; as from the commencement of my career at Jhajhar I had resolved to establish independence. I employed workmen and artificers of all kinds. I cast my own artillery, commenced making muskets, matchlocks and powder and in short, made the best preparations for carrying on an offensive and defensive war."

Between 1798 and 1801, he built Jahaj Kothi (c. 1796) and Jahaj Pul at Hisar, Haryana which was his residence, which was also used by James Skinner after George's defeat. He ruled the area independently up to 1801, when he was driven out by the Sikhs. At Hansi, he was finally defeated and captured by Patiala's army under General Sahib Singh and had his guns, throne and crown stripped off him. Here he abandoned all his conquests and retired east into British territory.

== Death ==
He died at Berhampore near Murshidabad in Bengal, of a fever on board his boat on his way to Calcutta down the Ganges river on 22 August 1802. He is buried in a grave at Residency Cemetery, Babulbona in Baharampur.

== Legacy ==
The Jahaj Kothi Museum, formerly George's residence, is named for him, as is Jahaj Pul suburb in Hisar of Haryana state in India.

George met his biographer William Francklin on the way to Berhampur shortly before his death, and narrated his exploits to William, who published George's biography "Military memoirs of George Thomas" in 1805, based on direct interaction and original documents.

James Skinner, while serving the Marathas, had earlier fought against George Thomas. After George's defeat, Skinner lived at Jahaj Kothi in Hisar. Skinner himself died at Hansi on 4 December 1841, at the age of 64.

== See also ==
- Frederick Wilson (Raja)
- James Skinner (East India Company officer)
- Walter Reinhardt Sombre
- Maratha Empire
- Company rule in India
