= Subana =

- Village
- Location in Haryana, India Subana (India)
- Country: India
- State: Haryana
- Region: North India
- District: Jhajjar

Languages
  - Official: Hindi
- Time zone: UTC+5:30 (IST)
- PIN: 124103
- ISO 3166 code: IN-HR
- Vehicle registration: HR-14
- Website: haryana.gov.in

Subana is a village located in Jhajjar district in the Indian state of Haryana.

== Demographics ==
In 2011, the population was 3,164.

== Religion ==
Majority of the residents are Hindus.

== Gotras ==
- Malhan (Dhanda)
- Bhukhara
- Jawlia

== See also ==
- Sarola
- Girdharpur, Jhajjar
- Khudan
- Chhapar, Jhajjar
- Dhakla, Jhajjar
