= List of ports and harbours of Gujarat =

Operational Ports and harbours of Gujarat

Gujarat is the westernmost state of India, positioned strategically along the Arabian Sea, fostering the development of dynamic port cities that serve as pivotal gateways for trade, cultural interchange, and geopolitical influence. The maritime legacy of Gujarat predates recorded history, exemplified by the ancient port city of Lothal, an unearthed Indus Valley Civilization settlement near Ahmedabad, showcasing the state's early involvement in maritime trade. Historical ports such as Bharuch and Cambay thrived as prominent centers for exporting spices, textiles, and precious stones to the world, fostering cultural exchange with influences from Persia, Arabia, and Egypt that enriched Gujarat's artistic and architectural landscape. With the arrival of European colonial powers in the 16th century, Gujarat's ports entered a new era. The Portuguese established themselves in Diu and Daman, while the British transformed Bombay (present-day Mumbai) into a major commercial hub. These colonial ports facilitated the export of raw materials such as cotton and opium, influencing the trade patterns of the region. Following independence, Gujarat experienced a renewed emphasis on developing its port infrastructure. The construction of Kandla in the 1960s positioned it as a major port for handling bulk cargo such as coal and iron ore. In the late 20th century, Mundra emerged as a significant container terminal. These modern ports have played a pivotal role in propelling Gujarat's industrial growth, attracting foreign investments, and facilitating international trade. Beyond their economic significance, the ports of Gujarat serve as vibrant cultural melting pots. Fishing communities along the coast contribute to the state's cultural tapestry with their traditional practices and folklore. Port cities like Surat and Veraval showcase rich architectural heritage, reflecting the diverse influences that have shaped Gujarat's maritime history.

== Contents ==
This list provides details on various port-related terms:

1. Port Location – The town or city where the port is situated. Note that the location may not always precisely correspond to the town/city center, as ports can be on the outskirts.
2. UN/LOCODE – The five-character port code assigned by the United Nations Code for Trade and Transport Locations.
3. IATA Port Code – The three-letter port code designated by the International Air Transport Association for ports.
4. Port Type – Classification based on the terminology used by relevant port authorities, as indicated in the first table below.
5. Port Operational Status – The current operational status of the port, as per the second table below.

Port Type	Description
Container Port	Port equipped to handle containerized cargo, facilitating both domestic and international trade.
Bulk Cargo Port	Port specializing in the handling of bulk cargo, such as coal, grain, or ore.
Passenger Port	Port primarily catering to passenger traffic, including cruise terminals and ferry terminals.
Military Port	Port under the control of the military where commercial activities are restricted. Distinct from dedicated military bases.

Port Ownwership	Description
Private Port	Port under the ownership and operation of private entities for exclusive use.
State-owned Port	Port under the ownership and operation of government entities.

Port Operational Status	Description
Operational	Indicates that the port is actively providing commercial services for public use.
Closed	Indicates that the port is no longer operational for commercial services.
Proposed or Under Construction	Indicates that the port is in the planning or construction phase and is not yet operational.

== List ==
This is a list of ports and harbours of the Indian Satate of Gujarat:

Name	Estb. Date/Year	City	District	Type	Operational	Owned/Operated by	Cargo Handled (FY2022-23)		Container Traffic (FY2022-23)		Image	Ref(s)
Name	Estb. Date/Year	City	District	Type	Operational	Owned/Operated by	million tonnes	% Increase (over previous FY)	'000 TEUs	% Increase (over previous FY)	Image	Ref(s)
Dahej Port	2010	Bharuch	Bharuch		Yes	Adani Group	17.5					
Deendayal Port Trust	1965	Kandla	Kutch		Yes	Government of India	137.0	4.42% ▲	117	95.73% ▲		
Hazira Port	2013	Hazira	Surat		Yes	Adani Group	30					
Mundra Port	1998	Mundra	Kutch		Yes	Adani Group	150					
Tuna Port	2022		Kutch		Yes	Adani Group	14					
Port Pipavav	2002	Pipavav	Amreli		Yes	APM Terminals	4.94	1.8% ▼	764	21.7% ▲		Cargo tonnage only includes bulk
Sikka Port	1933	Sikka	Jamnagar		Yes	Reliance Industries	10					
Jakhau Port	2005	Jakhau	Kutch		Yes	Government of Gujarat	6					
Okha Port	1930	Okha	Devbhoomi Dwarka		Yes	Government of Gujarat	3					
Porbandar Port		Porbandar	Porbandar		Yes	Government of Gujarat	11					
Bhavnagar Port		Bhavnagar	Bhavnagar		Yes							
Mandvi Port		Mandvi	Kutch		Yes							
Veraval Port		Veraval	Gir Somnath		Yes							
Gopnath Port		Gopnath	Bhavnagar		Yes							
Magdalla Port		Magdalla	Surat		Yes							
Navlakhi Port		Navlakhi	Jamnagar		Yes							
Bedi Port		Bedi	Jamnagar		Yes							
Salaya Port		Salaya	Devbhoomi Dwarka		Yes							
Shiyalbet Port		Shiyalbet	Bhavnagar		Yes							
Jafrabad Port		Jafrabad	Amreli		Yes							
Mithivirdi Port		Mithivirdi	Bhavnagar		Yes							
Mora Port		Mora	Surat		Yes							
Vansi-Borsi Port		Vansi-Borsi	Valsad		Yes							
Nargol Port		Nargol	Valsad		Yes							
Ghogha Port		Ghogha	Bhavnagar		Yes							
Chhara Port		Chhara	Amreli		Yes							
Gogha Port		Gogha	Bhavnagar		Yes							

== Gallery ==
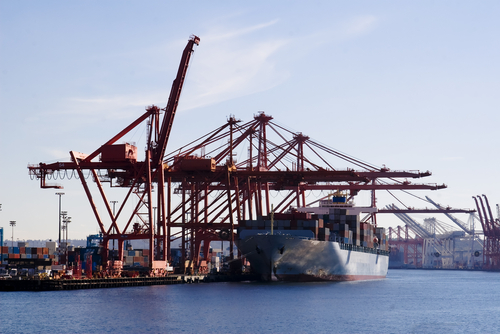
Mundra Port, Gujarat, India

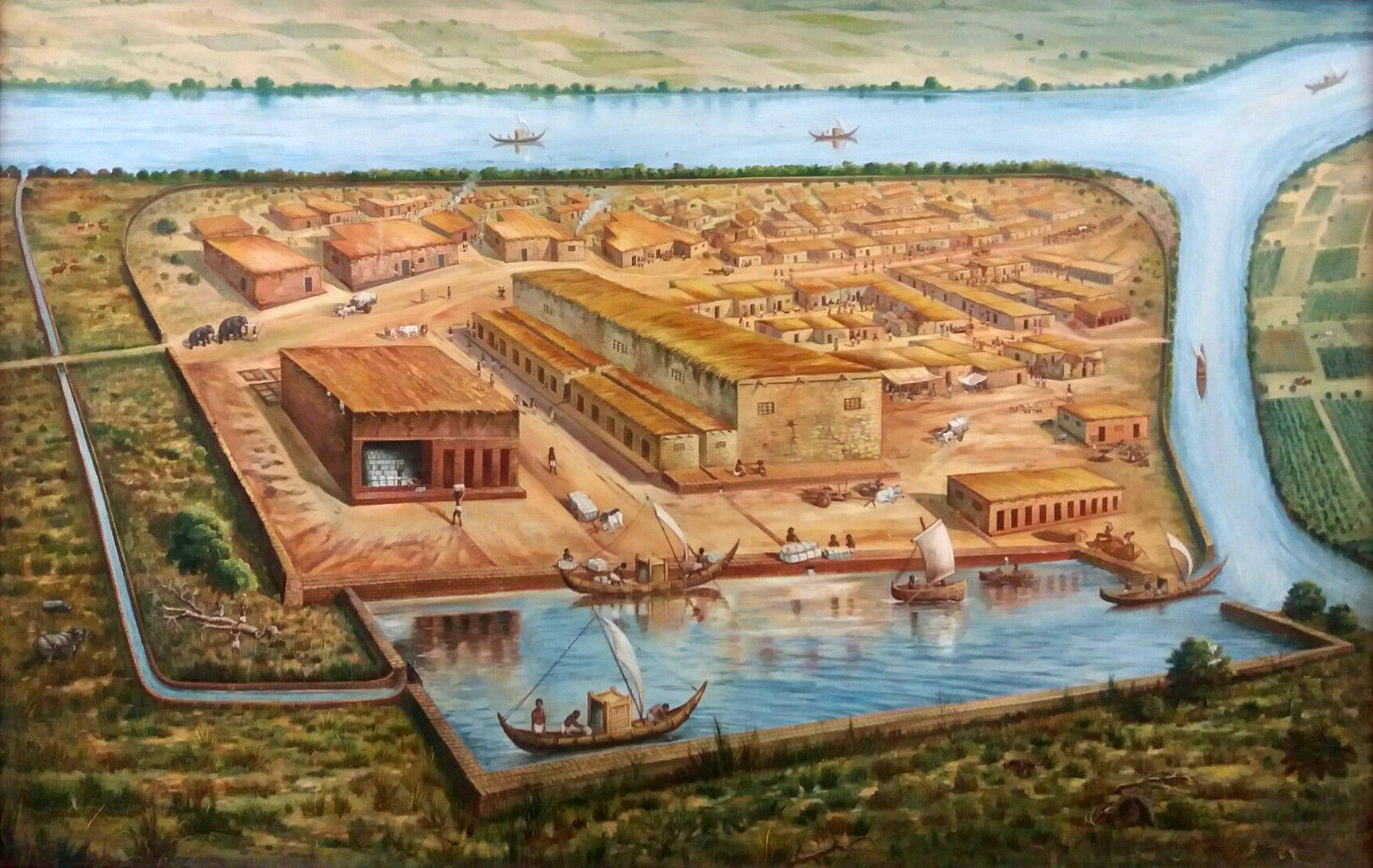
Lothal, Ancient Port City

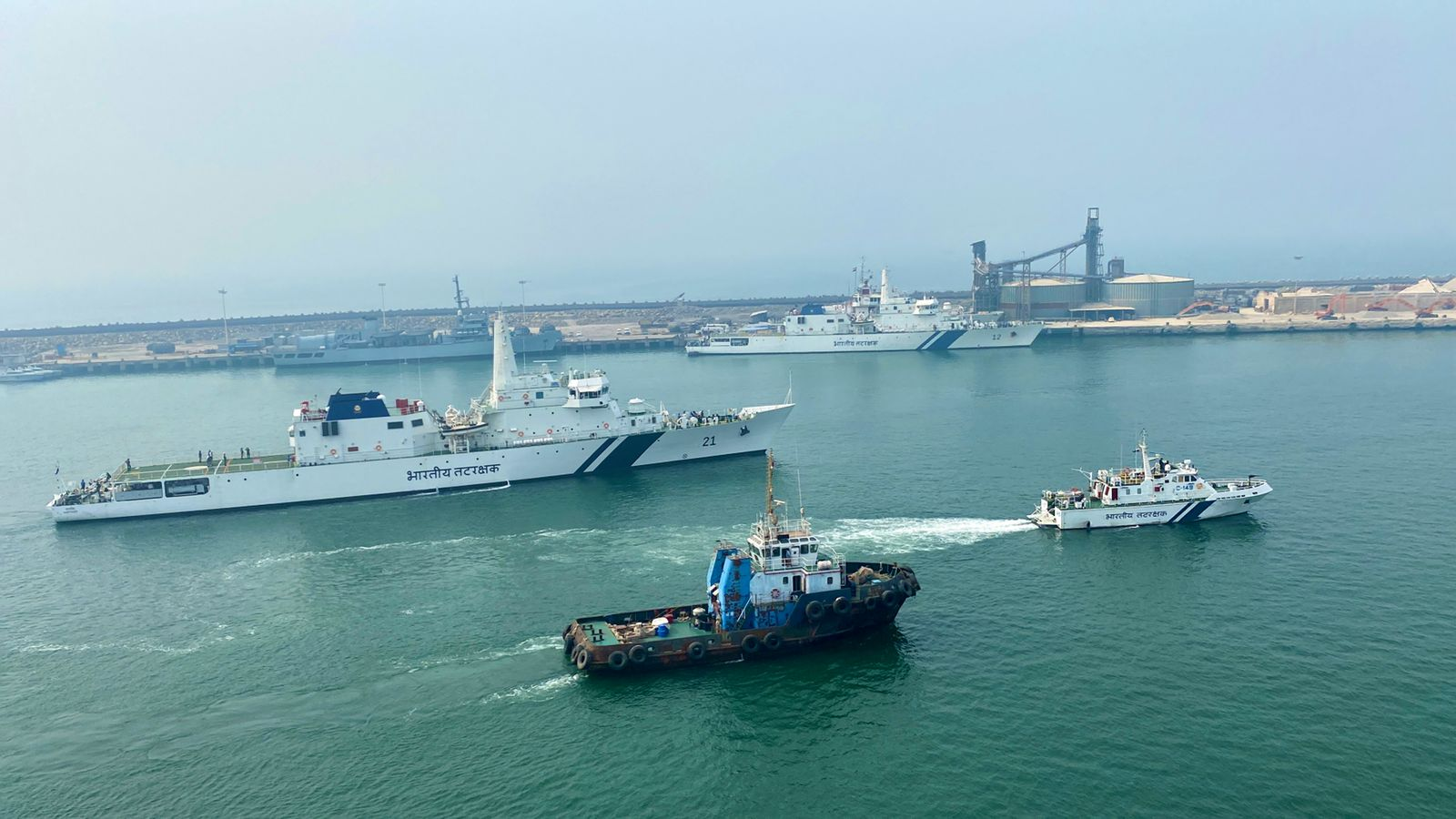
Sarthak arrived at Porbandar Port

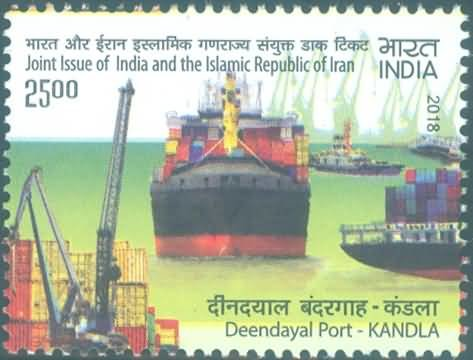
Stamp of India 2018, Kandla, India

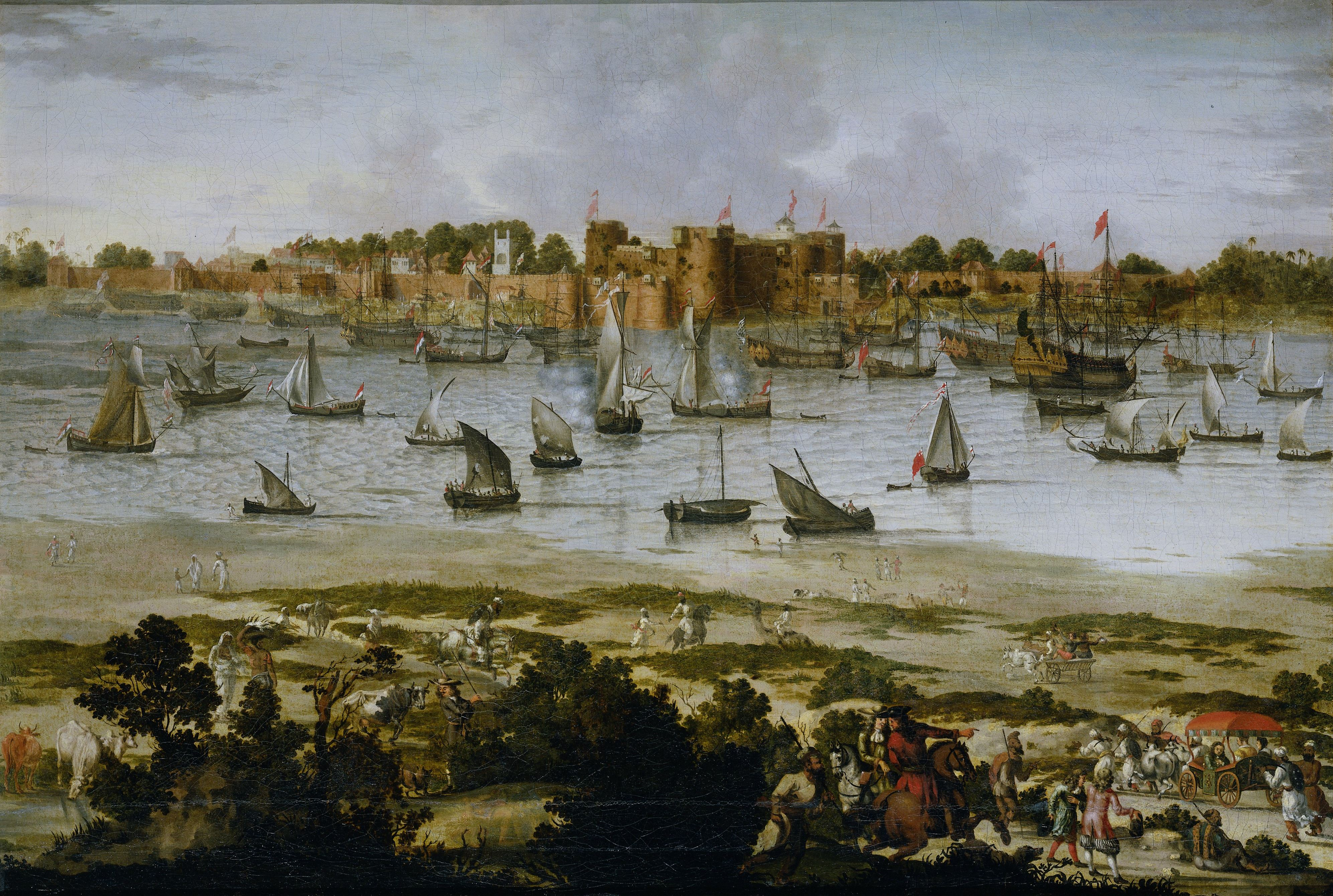
View of the harbor of Sūrat (Gujarāt)
