= Mohanbari, Jhajjar =

Mohanbari
- Village
- Location in Haryana, India Mohanbari (India)
- Country: India
- State: Haryana
- Region: North India
- District: Jhajjar

Languages
  - Official: Hindi
- Time zone: UTC+5:30 (IST)
- PIN: 124142
- ISO 3166 code: IN-HR
- Vehicle registration: HR-14
- Website: haryana.gov.in

Mohanbari or Chhota Jhanswa is a village in Matannail mandal, Jhajjar district of Haryana state, India.
