= Ladrawan =

- Village
- Location in Haryana, India Ladrawan (India)
- Coordinates: 28.79529°N 76.93362°E
- Country: India
- State: Haryana
- District: Jhajjar

Population (2001)
  - Total: 8,007

Languages
  - Official: Hindi
- Time zone: UTC+5:30 (IST)
- ISO 3166 code: IN-HR
- Vehicle registration: HR
- Website: haryana.gov.in

Ladrawan is a census village in Jhajjar district in the Indian state of Haryana.

== Demographics ==
As of 2001 India census, Ladrawan had a population of 8007. Males constitute 55% of the population and females 45%. Ladrawan has an average literacy rate of 49%, lower than the national average of 59.5%: male literacy is 57%, and female literacy is 39%. In Ladrawan, 17% of the population is under 6 years of age.
