= Birar =

- Location within Haryana Location within India
- Coordinates: 28.4961°N 76.4710°E
- Country: India
- State: Haryana
- District: Jhajjar district
- Municipality: Jhajjar

Population (2011)
  - Total: 2,200
- Postal code: 124146
- ISO 3166 code: RJ-IN
- Vehicle registration: HR14
- Website: www.jhajjar.nic.in

Birar is a village in the Jhajjar district of Haryana, India. It has a private college school named Cambridge International. It is in Matenhail tehsil.

== Demographics of 2011 ==
As of the 2011 India census, Birar had a population of 2,900 in 850 households. Males (1481) constitute 51.4% of the population and females (1419) 48.59%. Birar has an average literacy (1534) rate of 69.72%, lower than the national average of 74%: male literacy (887) is 57.93%, and female literacy (647) is 42.17% of total literates (1534). In Birar, Jhajjar 12.18% of the population is under 6 years of age (268).

Demography of Birar Village - 2011 census
| Category | Percent |
| Male Population | 51.4% |
| Female Population | 48.59% |
| Average Literacy | 69.72% |
| Male Literacy of total literates | 57.93% |
| Female Literacy of total literates | 42.17% |
| Population below 6 years of age | 12.18% |

Demographics of Birar as of 2011.
1. Male (51.4%)
2. Females (48.6%)

== Adjacent villages ==
- Humayunpur
- Ladayan
- Jamalpur
- Bhurawas
- (A)Kheri Madanpur

== Villages of similar name in India ==
- In Uttarakhand (State), Almora (District), Jainti (Sub District), Birar (Village)
- In Haryana (State), Jhajjar (District), Matenhail (Sub District), Birar (Village)
- In Rajasthan (State), Bharatpur (District), Kaman (Sub District), Birar (Village)
- In Uttar Pradesh (State), Gorakhpur (District), Sahjanwa (Sub District), Birar (Village)
- In Uttar Pradesh (State), Sonbhadra (District), Dudhi (Sub District), Birar (Village)
- In Jharkhand (State), Kodarma (District), Chandwara (Sub District), Birar (Village)
