= B. D. Sharma =

1st Chief Minister of Haryana (1918–1993)

Bhagwat Dayal Sharma
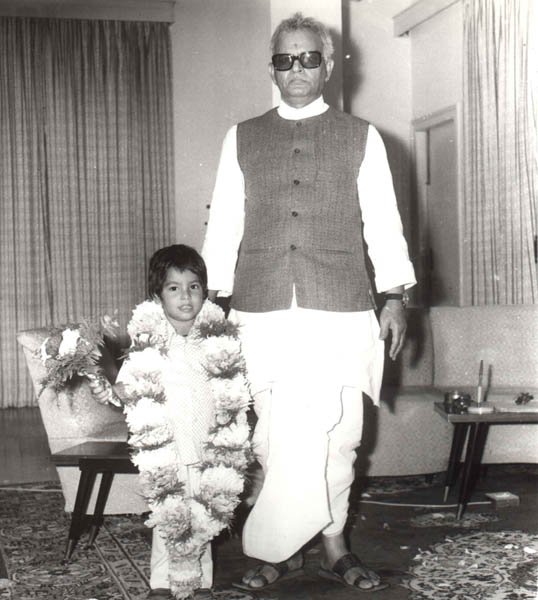

7th Governor of Madhya Pradesh
- In office 8 October 1983 – 14 May 1984
- Chief Minister: Arjun Singh
- Preceded by: G. P. Singh (Acting)
- Succeeded by: K. M. Chandy
- In office 10 July 1981 – 20 September 1983
- Chief Minister: Arjun Singh
- Preceded by: G. P. Singh (Acting)
- Succeeded by: G. P. Singh (Acting)
- In office 30 April 1980 – 25 May 1981
- Chief Minister: Arjun Singh
- Preceded by: C. M. Poonacha
- Succeeded by: G. P. Singh (Acting)

12th Governor of Odisha
- In office 23 September 1977 – 30 April 1980
- Chief Minister: Nilamani Routray
- Preceded by: Harcharan Singh Brar
- Succeeded by: C. M. Poonacha

1st Chief Minister of Haryana
- In office 1 November 1966 – 23 March 1967
- Preceded by: Office Established
- Succeeded by: Rao Birender Singh

Personal details
- Born: 26 January 1918 Beri, Punjab, British India
- Died: 22 February 1993 (aged 75) New Delhi, India
- Party: Indian National Congress
- Spouse: Savitri Devi
- Children: 6

Bhagwat Dayal Sharma (26 January 1918 – 22 February 1993), popularly known as Panditji, was the first Chief Minister of the Indian state of Haryana and later Governor of Odisha and Madhya Pradesh from 30 April 1980 to 14 May 1984. He is one of the greatest leaders of Haryana and his legacy is celebrated even today.

== Personal life ==
He was born in Beri, a town in the Jhajjar district of Haryana on 26 January 1918. Bansi Lal, Bhajan Lal and many other noted politicians learned politics under his guidance.

He married Savitri Devi and they had six children; three sons and three daughters. He did his schooling from Birla College (Now Birla School, Pilani), Pilani and his higher studies from Banaras Hindu University, Banaras. His eldest son Sh. Rajesh Sharma became Sports Minister of Haryana and Deputy Chairman of the State's Planning Board. After his wife Savitri's death, Panditji built "Savitri Nikunj", in her memory, an exotic garden with indigenous and rare plants and trees at Raj Bhawan in Bhopal.

== Independence movement and political career ==
He participated in the freedom struggle from 1941 to 1947. He was sentenced to jail for 1 year in 1941 and for 3.5 years in 1942. He was a member of Indian labourers delegation to the International Labour Organization (ILO) in Geneva in 1957 and 1958. He was All-India Trade Union Congress (Punjab HP, J & K) Secretary and President in 1959–61. He was a member of Punjab Legislative Assembly and Minister of State for Labour and Cooperatives from 1962 to 1966 Sharma became Chief Minister of Haryana on 1 November 1966 then resigned to be replaced by Rao Birender Singh on 24 March 1967. He was a Rajya Sabha member from 1968 to 1974 and an All India Congress Working Committee member from 1970 to 1972.

He was appointed Governor of Odisha in 1977, during his time in the state, he became patron of many social and cultural institutions. To develop tourism in Odisha, he suggested that the summer Raj Bhavan at Puri should be converted to a high class hotel for international tourists with facilities for golf, swimming and tennis as well as a large hall for holding conferences. The Indian Tourist Development Corporation (ITDC) was subsequently asked to take up the venture. Sharma was also actively involved in the administrative committee of the Hindu Jagannath temple in Puri. He decided to side with the syndicate after the expulsion of Indira Gandhi from the Congress. He subsequently transferred to Madhya Pradesh since the Odisha climate did not suit his health.

During his career, Panditji travelled to Switzerland, the UK, the USSR, Germany, USA, and a number of other European countries.

== Death ==
He died on 22 February 1993 because of gradual declining health and old age. Huge numbers of people from all over world attended his funeral. His cremation took place at Beri (the village, he was born at), Jhajjar, Haryana. A tomb place has been built at the site of his cremation in Beri.

== Honors ==
Pandit Bhagwat Dayal Sharma University of Health Sciences, Rohtak, which is named after him, incorporates the Pandit Bhagwat Dayal Sharma Post Graduate Institute of Medical Sciences.

Preceded by C. M. Poonacha (first term); G. P. Singh (second term); G. P. Singh (third term)	Governor of Madhya Pradesh; 30 April 1980 – 25 May 1981 (first term); 10 July 1981 – 20 September 1983 (second term); 8 October 1983 – 14 May 1984 (third term)	Succeeded by G. P. Singh; G. P. Singh (second term); Kizhekethil Chandy(third term)
Preceded by Cheppudira Muthanna Poonacha	Governor of Odisha; 23 September 1977 – 30 April 1980	Succeeded by Harcharan Singh Brar
