= Gudha, Jhajjar =

- Location within Haryana Location within India
- Coordinates: 28.642238°N 76.640549°E
- Country: India
- State: Haryana
- District: Jhajjar district
- Municipality: Jhajjar

Population (2024)
  - Total: 3,617
- Postal code: 124103
- Vehicle registration: HR 14
- Website: www.jhajjar.nic.in

Gudha is a village in Jhajjar Tehsil, Jhajjar district, Haryana, India, in Rohtak Division. It is 3.0 kilometres (1.9 mi) north of Jhajjar. Its postal head office is Jhajjar. Jhajjar new Bus stand is near Gudha and it is Haryana's biggest bus stand with 28 booths.

== Demographics of 2011 ==
As of 2011 India census, Gudha had a population of 2812 in 549 households. Males (1530) constitute 54.4% of the population and females (1282) 45.59%. Gudha has an average literacy (2029) rate of 72.15%, lower than the national average of 74%: male literacy (1216) is 59.93%, and female literacy (829) is 40.85% of total literates (2029). In Gudha, Jhajjar 11.34% of the population is under 6 years of age (319).

== Adjacent villages ==
- Kheri Khummar
- Zahidpur Alias Azadp
- Nogaon
- Birdhana
