= Ram Mehar =

Indian long jumper

Personal information
- Nationality: Indian
- Born: 24 May 1934 (age 92) Bhaproda, British India (now in Haryana)

Sport
- Sport: Athletics
- Event: Long jump

Ram Mehar (born 24 May 1934) is an Indian athlete. He competed in the men's long jump at the 1956 Summer Olympics.
