= Manjul Bhardwaj =

Indian actor, writer and activist

- Born: Dahkora, Bahadurgarh, Jhajjar, Haryana, India
- Occupations: Actor, writer, director, social activist

Manjul Bhardwaj is an actor, director, writer, facilitator, and initiator in theatre. He is from Dahkora Village in Jhajjar District of Haryana, India. For the past 25 years, he has been based in Mumbai and dedicated himself to creating "The Theatre of Relevance." As a writer and director, he has written and directed more than 25 plays.

In 1992, Bhardwaj founded The Experimental Theatre Foundation, a pioneering theatre movement in India. He has conducted more than 300 "Theatre of Relevance" workshops for a variety of organizations, institutions and groups, in 28 states of India as well as abroad (Singapore and Germany). Brandeis University sends students for internship to understand fundamentals, principles, concepts and processes of "Theatre of Relevance".

His work has focused on issues such as child labour, people affected by HIV and AIDS, and what is known as "Sex-Selection" (the homicide of female fetus).

In 2006, he and his group were invited in "Kinder Kultur Karawane" by Buro Fur Kultur Und-Medien Projekte to Germany to perform the play "Vishwa – The World" for 41 days from 10 September to 20 October 2006. The play was performed 24 times in 13 cities of Germany (Hamburg, Ahrensburg, Berlin, Dessau, Penzberg, Biberach, Dobeln, Wiesbaden, Marburg, Chemnitz, Aschaffenburg, Freiburg and Radolfzell).

== Theatre career ==
Bhardwaj has written or directed the following plays:

Sr.No.	Year	Name of The Play	Language	Subject	Play Time	First Time Presented At	First Time Presented on
1	1993	Door Se Kisi Ne Aawaj Di	Hindi	Secularism & National Integration	30 Mins	Birla Krida Kendra, Girgaon, Mumbai	12 February 1993
2	1993	Dekha Dekhi	Hindi	Commercialization & Middle Class	60 mins	Karnataka Sangh, Matunga, Mumbai	17 April 1993
3	1994	Mera Bachpan	Hindi	Child Labour	40 Mins	Gautam Nagar, Charkop, Kandivali (W), Mumbai	12 April 1994
4	1994	Dwandwa	Hindi	Household Violence	30 Mins	Tata Community Centre, Chembur, Mumbai	31 July 1994
5	1998	Napunsak	Hindi	Political & Social Satire	50 Mins	Sydenham College, Churchgate, Mumbai	9 March 1998
6	1998	Main Aurat Hun	Hindi	Women Identity	30 Mins	Mumbai University, Mumbai	11 April 1998
7	1999	Vidya Dadati Viniyam	Hindi	Importance of Education	40 Mins	Karnataka Sangh, Matunga, Mumbai	13 January 1999
8	2000	B-7	English	Globalization, Privatization, & Commercialization	50 Mins	UNESCO Theatre, Hannover, Germany	7 September 2000
9	2001	B-7	Hindi	Globalization, Privatization, & Commercialization	50 Mins	Prithvi Theatre, Mumbai	18 January 2001
10	2002	Dhundh	Hindi	Child Sexual Exploitation	50 Mins	A.V. Room, N.C.P.A. Mumbai	21 November 2002
11	2003	Red Light	Hindi	Human Trafficking	50 Mins	Mumbai Police Gymkhana, Mumbai	16 March 2003
12	2005	Ladali	Hindi	Sex/Gender selection – Female Foeticide	60 Mins	Tata Theatre, S.P.P.A.A. Mumbai	9 June 2005
13	2006	Vishwa – The World	English	Youth Struggles Dreams & their Idols	70 Mins	Aufführung, "Kultur im Betrieb", Beiersdorf AG, Unnastraße 48, Hamburg, Germany	12 September 2006
14	2012	Chhed Chhad Kyun?	Hindi	Eve-teasing and Sexual Harassment	70 Mins	Ravindra Natya Mandir, Mumbai	28 September 2012
15	2013	Garbh	Hindi	Awakening Human within Human	80 Mins	Ravindra Natya Mandir, Mumbai	1 March 2013
16	2013	Drop by Drop :Water	Hindi	Celebrating water's life-sustaining virtue but strongly opposing its Privatization	70 Mins	Kinder Kultur Karawane −2013, Hamburg, Germany	31 August 2013
17	2015	Anhad Naad-Unheard Sounds of Universe	Hindi	Liberation of Art & Artists from Birth	90 Mins	Ravindra Natya Mandir – Dadar (W) Mumbai	29 May 2015
18	2016	Sangrash Shetkaryancha	Marathi	Plight of Farmers & Agricultural Crisis in India	60 Mins	Sindhudurg, Maharashtra	May 2016
19	2017	Nyay ke Bhanwar Main Bhanwari	Hindi	Women Liberation to Challenge the Authority of Patriarchy	70 Mins	M L Bhartia Auditorium, Lodhi Road, New Delhi 3.	17 November 2017

== Awards/Nominations ==
- UNFPA-Laadli Media Awards for Western Region for Gender Sensitivity 2006–07 – Category – 16. Theatre- Street Theatre Manjul Bhardwaj, Experimental Theatre Foundation

== Theaters / Workshops Conducted ==
Dates	Location	Name of the Theater / Workshop	In Association with
4 June 2012 15 – June 2012	Ashirwad Bhawan, Dongargarh, Chhattisgarh	Bal Rang Karyashala – "Aao Khele Natak"	The Indian People's Theatre Association (IPTA) Dongargarh, Chhattisgarh

== Corporate Trainer ==
Bhardwaj is also a human process facilitator and corporate trainer. He has evolved "Theatre of Relevance" based training modules in corporate and management development. He is experimenting and implementing "Theatre of Relevance" based training modules for more than a decade in reputed public and private sector companies i.e., ONGC, Indian Oil Corporation, Bharat Heavy Electricals Limited, Bharat Petroleum Corporation Limited, Tehri Hydro Development Corporation (THDC Ltd), Central Bank of India and Reliance Energy (Anil Dhirubhai Ambani Group).

His concept ‘Role of theatre of Relevance in HR’ is used as pedagogical tool to learn HR process in EMPI's Udai Pareek HR labs in EMPI Business School, Delhi. He has also intervened in understanding human processes through theatre in ISABS. He is a visiting faculty in a number of institutions, academies and organizations in India and abroad.
