= Bhindawas =

Bhindawas, Jhajjar
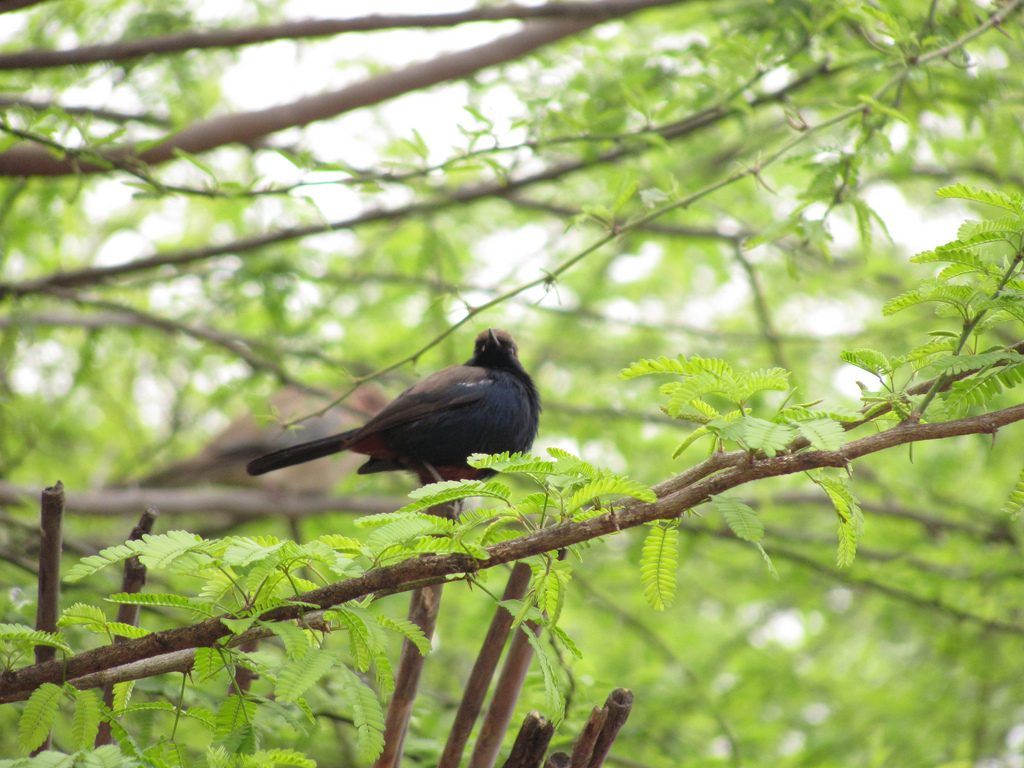
- Saxicoloides fulicatus at the Bhindawas Wildlife Sanctuary

- Location within Haryana Location within India
- Coordinates: 28.553402°N 76.553881°E
- Country: India

Government
  - Body: Village panchayat

Population (2011)
  - Total: 2,074
- Time zone: UTC+5:30 (IST)
- PIN: 12x xxx
- Website: www.jhajjar.nic.in

Bhindawas is a village in Jhajjar district, Haryana, India. It is about 15 km from Jhajjar. It is in Matenhail sub-district. Bhindawas Wildlife Sanctuary is nearby. The village was founded by Puhaniya Ahirs a few centuries ago. Army and agriculture were the main profession of people but now many have migrated to nearby cities and work in various government and private organizations.

== Demographics of 2011 ==
As of 2011 India census, Bhindawas had a population of 2074 in 422 households. Males (1088) constitute 52.45% of the population and females (986) 47.54%. Bhindawas has an average literacy (1450) rate of 69.91%, lower than the national average of 74%: male literacy (847) is 58.41%, and female literacy (603) is 41.58% of total literates (1450). In Bhindawas, Jhajjar, 12.63% of the population is under 6 years of age (262).

== Adjacent villages ==
Sahjanpur Bilochpura Surajgarh Chadwana Kadhodha *Chandol

- Dhakla
- Surehti
- rayia
- dawala
