= K. R. Punia =

Indian politician (1936–2025)

Member of the Haryana Legislative Assembly
- In office 1987–1989
- Constituency: Baroda
- Majority: Lok Dal

Personal details
- Born: 1 January 1936 Salhawas, Rohtak district, Punjab Province, British India
- Died: 18 January 2025 (aged 89) Panchkula, Haryana, India
- Party: Independent
- Other political affiliations: Indian National Congress, Bahujan Samaj Party
- Relatives: P. L. Punia

Kirpa Ram Punia (1 January 1936 – 18 January 2025) was an Indian politician. He was a member of Janata Dal in the late 1980s, and served as a minister of industries under the Devi Lal's state government, then Chief Minister of Haryana, from 1987 to 1989.

== Early life and education ==
Punia was born on 1 January 1936 in Salhawas, Haryana. He held a PhD, and a Diploma in Russian language and land management from the University of Cambridge.

== Politics and career ==
Punia had worked as a psychologist at the Indian Air Force's selection committee. Later, he joined the Indian Administrative Service, and became an officer. He was a member of the board of directors of Air India.

In 1987, Punia won the 1987 election, with 50,882 of the total 91,066 votes, and became a member of the Haryana Vidhan Sabha. He became Government of Haryana's minister of industries, and served until his resignation in 1989 in protest to a speech delivered by Om Prakash Chautala.

Punia was close to Ghulam Nabi Azad. That along with his friendship with Madhavrao Scindia helped him join the Indian National Congress in 1991.

In 2005, he ran for the state election to the Haryana Legislative Assembly as an independent candidate to represent the Baroda constituency, and came fourth with 10356 votes (13.67% of the total votes).

In 2017, he joined the Bahujan Samaj Party. Before joining the BSP, he was a member of the INC party. In December 2018, he quit the Bahujan Samaj Party.

== Personal life and death ==
Punia, a Dalit leader, was the son of Shri Puran Chand Punia. His brother P. L. Punia is a member of the Rajya Sabha—the upper house of the Parliament of India.

Punia died on 18 January 2025, at the age of 89.

== See also ==
- P. L. Punia
- Ghulam Nabi Azad
