= Khairi Gaoin =

Khairi
- Village
- Location within Haryana Location within India
- Coordinates: 29.467352°N 75.783224°E
- Country: India
- State: Haryana
- District: Hisar

Government
  - Type: Local government
  - Body: Panchayat

Languages
  - Official: Hindi
- Time zone: UTC+5:30 (IST)
- PIN: 125112
- Vehicle registration: HR-80
- Website: haryana.gov.in

Khairi is a small village in the Hisar district under the Uklanamandi constituency in Haryana, India. It is 14 kilometres (8.7 mi) to the west of the Uklana Mandi.

Khairi was a part of the Pabra village. Khairi, Pabra, Kandul, Kinala & Faridpur are collectively called 'Panchgrami' & they are KUNDU clan majority villages. In 1805, Khairi separated from the Pabra village and became its own entity. Although the main source of employment remains agriculture, there is a good number working in the service sector (teachers, doctors, engineers, etc.) and other private sector jobs. Some people run sole proprietorship businesses like grocery shops. The literacy rate is almost 85% in the village. Population of Khairi is about 4000 & sex ratio is 950/1000.

After partition in 1947, Muslim Rajputs (Muhammad Usman s/o Abdul Rasheed with his wife Hakimman and sons Jumshid Ali (late), Karaamat Ali(late), Sodager Ali and moujdin(late))) migrated to Mahni sial, tehsil kabirwala, District Khanewal, Punjab, Pakistan. They have all the facilities such as electricity (1976), natural gas, and two Govt high schools - one for boys and other for girls.

The Gram panchayat has restricted resources, therefore infrastructure development is minimal. Shanti devi high school, Sun rise Sr sec school and Baba bilasgar public are private schools in Khairi. Subedaar Mejor Dariya Singh S/o Sh Chandu Ram was the 1st graduate of the village. Saheed Dhoop Singh S/o Sh Dhan Singh and Saheed Mehar Singh Sharma were martyr in 1971 war and many other men serve for Indian Military. Baba Tripurari Giri temple is have a special temple in village, which is main temple of junagarh akhara, Giri Panth. People have good brotherhood in the village.
