= Gijarod =

Gijrod
- Village
- Location in Haryana, India Gijrod (India)
- Country: India
- State: Haryana
- Region: North India
- District: Jhajjar

Languages
  - Official: Hindi
- Time zone: UTC+5:30 (IST)
- PIN: 124103
- ISO 3166 code: IN-HR
- Vehicle registration: HR-14
- Website: haryana.gov.in

Gijarod is a mid-sized village located in the district of Jhajjar in the Indian state of Haryana. It has a population of about 2011 persons living in around 354 households.
