= Rohtak Junction railway station =

Railway Station in Haryana, India

Rohtak Junction
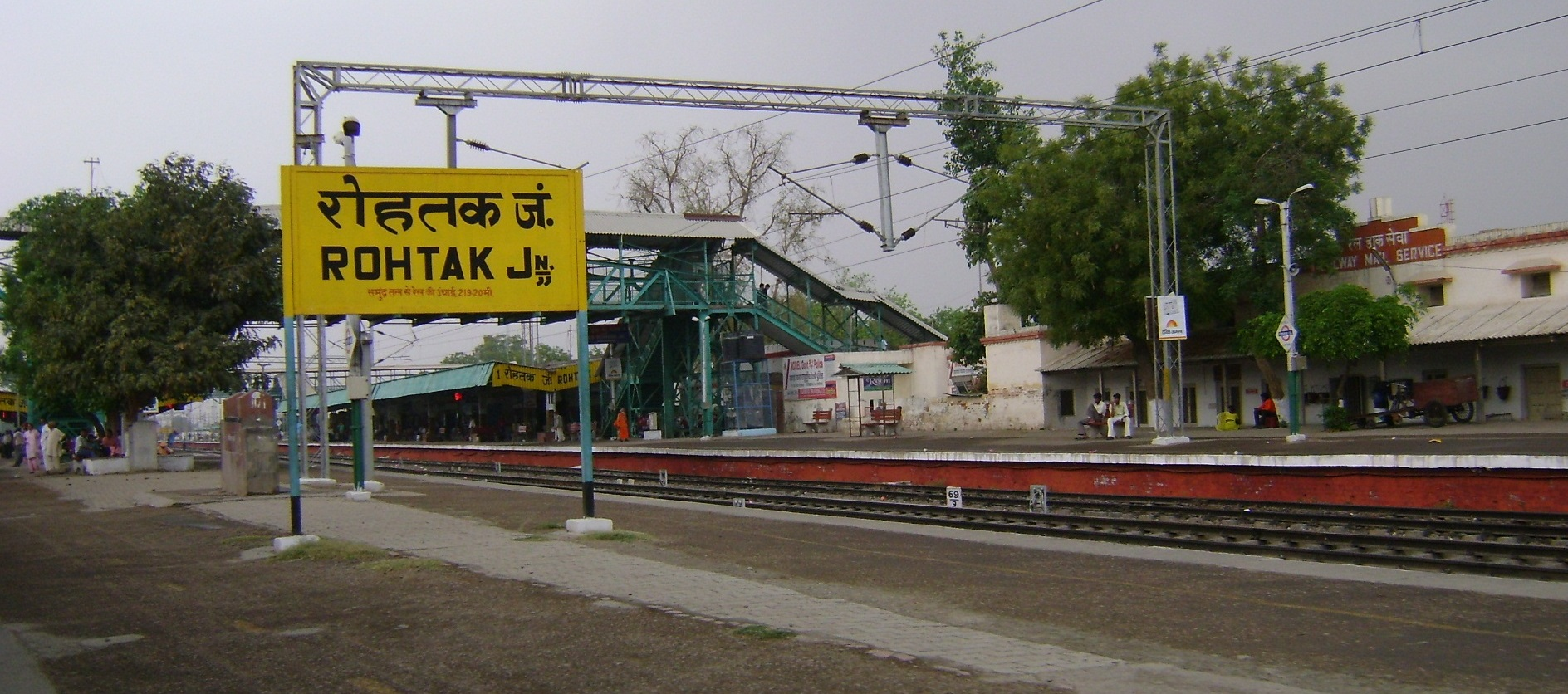
- Rohtak Railway Station

General information
- Location: Rohtak, Haryana; India
- Coordinates: 28.8907°N 76.5801°E
- Elevation: 220 m (722 ft)
- System: Express train and Passenger train station
- Owner: Ministry of Railways (India)
- Operator: Indian Railways
- Lines: Delhi–Fazilka line, Rohtak–Rewari line, Rohtak–Panipat line, Rohtak–Hansi line, Rohtak–Bhiwani line
- Platforms: 3
- Tracks: 4
- Connections: Taxi stand, Auto stand

Construction
- Structure type: At grade
- Parking: Available
- Cycle facilities: Available
- Accessible: Available

Other information
- Status: Operational
- Station code: ROK
- Zone(s): Northern Railway
- Division(s): Delhi

Services
Preceding station	Indian Railways	Following station
Asthal Bohar towards ?	Northern Railway zone Rewari–Rohtak line	Samar Gopalpur towards ?
Location
- Location within Haryana Location within India

Rohtak Junction Railway Station (station code: ROK) is a main railway station in Rohtak, Haryana. Its code is ROK. The station consists of three platforms. There are many trains available for Delhi, Panipat, Rewari, Bhiwani, Jind and Hansi as well as for long-distance journey.

Rohtak is connected to Bahadur Garh through Delhi line, to Gohana through Panipat line, to Meham through Hansi line and Jhajjar through Rewari line. Delhi and Jind connections are part of the Delhi–Fazilka line, and the line is double tracked from Delhi to Bhatinda, Punjab, India, and is electrified between Delhi and Rohtak. All other lines are single track, and unelectrified. A new railway line from Rohtak to Rewari via Jhajjar became operational from January 2013.

First CNG train of India also runs between Rohtak and Rewari via Jhajjar.
