= Jhajjar railway station =

Railway station in Jhajjar, India

Jhajjar Railway Station

General information
- Location: NH- 334BJhajjar, Haryana; India
- Coordinates: 28.5935°N 76.6388°E
- Elevation: 216 m (709 ft)
- System: Indian Railways station
- Owner: Indian Railways
- Operator: Delhi
- Line: Rewari–Rohtak line
- Platforms: 3 BG
- Tracks: 4 BG
- Connections: Taxi stand, auto stand

Construction
- Structure type: Standard (on-ground station)
- Parking: Available
- Cycle facilities: Available
- Accessible: Disabled access

Other information
- Station code: JHJ
- Fare zone: Northern Railways

Passengers
- 5000

Services
Preceding station	Indian Railways	Following station
Machhrauli towards ?	Northern Railway zone Rewari–Rohtak line	Dighal towards ?
Location

Jhajjar railway station (code JHJ) is a railway station in NCR in Jhajjar city of Haryana state of India. I It lies to the west of the Jhajjhar city on the State Highway 22.

== History ==
In 2013, Jhajjar railway station and the Rohtak–Jhajjar–Rewari railway line, both became operational after a delay of 33 years.

In 2015, first CNG train of India started to run through Jhajjhar with a halt at this station.

In 2025, upgrade Jhajjar railway station under the Amrit Bharat Station Scheme (ABSS) was completed, which included comprehensive improvements (such as the parking, three‑storeyed building, extended platforms and sheds, wider approach road, addition of second entry gate) and passenger amenities (AC lobby, high-speed escalators, expanded waiting hall, executive lounge, improved signage, better lighting for safety, circulation areas, green spaces, and local artwork), aimed at transforming the station into a modern, passenger‑friendly facility.

== Facilities ==
The station, with three platforms, has many long-distance trains including to Delhi, Rohtak, Chandigarh, Rewari and other areas.

== Train services ==
=== Rail lines ===
- Existing
  - Rewari–Rohtak line
- Planned
  - Garhi Harsaru-Loharu line 129 km long as core of South Haryana Economic Rail Corridor: FSL (Final Location Survey) commenced in July 2023 at the cost of ₹3.19 crore. funding awaited. This link will enable shortest direct link between IGI Delhi Airport and Hisar Airport from Bijwasan railway station-Jhajjhar via either Rohtak-Maham or Charkhi Dadri-Bhiwani-Hansi.
    - Garhi Harsaru-Jhajjhar line via Farrukhnagar Nagar-Jhajjhar 24 km long double-track costing ₹1,225 crore: In June 2023, the state government had submitted the completed feasibility study to the centre government for the funding approval at 50-50% cost sharing between both government.
    - Jhajjhar-Loharu line via Charkhi Dadri: This route will have 6 new stations within Jhajjhar, including Talao, Birhar Majra (formally known as M.P. Majra), Chhuchhakwas, Matanhail, and Birohar-Khachroli.
  - Jhajjar-Narnaul-Khairthal line 155 km long: the completed Feasibility Report was submitted to the Indian Railway by the Government of Haryana in 2022. approval awaited. Feasibility study completed as of 2025.

== Major trains ==
There are nearly dozen trains which stop here.

- Rohtak–Rewari DEMU
- Rewari–Rohtak (via Jhajjar) Passenger
- Chandigarh Daulatpur Chowk–Jaipur Intercity Express
- Rewari–Rohtak- Jind DEMU

== See also ==
- Railway in Haryana
- Transport in Haryana
- Transport in Delhi
