= Jahazgarh =

- village
- Location in Haryana, India Jahazgarh (India)
- Coordinates: 28.64°N 76.56°E
- Country: India
- State: Haryana
- District: Jhajjar

Population (2001)
  - Total: 4,724

Languages
  - Official: Hindi
- Time zone: UTC+5:30 (IST)
- PIN: 124103
- ISO 3166 code: IN-HR
- Vehicle registration: HR 77
- Website: haryana.gov.in

Jahazgarh or Jahajgarh is a prominent village in Jhajjar District, Haryana, India. It is about 10 kilometres (6 mi) from Jhajjar and about 35 kilometres (22 mi) from Delhi border on Delhi-Dadari-Pilani state highway. The 1,320 megawatts Jhajjar Thermal Power Project is about 20 km from the village.

== Demography ==
The total population is 4724, of which 2465 are male and 2259 female.
