= Machhrauli =

Place in Haryana, India

- Machhrauli
- Location within Haryana Location within India
- Coordinates: 28.475069°N 76.651379°E
- Country: India

Government
  - Body: Village panchayat

Population (2011)
  - Total: 4,453
- Time zone: UTC+5:30 (IST)
- PIN: 124 108
- Vehicle registration: HR14 Private HR63 Commercial
- Website: www.jhajjar.nic.in

Machhrauli is situated in the Indian state of Haryana. Machhrauli become Block (District Subdivision) in June 2020.

== Geography ==
Machhrauli is about 15 km from the nearest town, Jhajjar. It is in Matenhail sub district. Nearby villages:

- Khudan
- Chandpur
- Samaspur Majra
- Asadpur Khera
- Amadalpur
- Surheti
- Kahari
- Kheri Taluka patauda (Kheri Sultan)
- Dhani Ahiran
- Bhatera
- Ghatoli

== Demographics ==
As of 2011 India census, Machhrauli, Jhajjar had a population of 4,453 in 796 households. Males (2,335) constituted 52.43% of the population and females (2,118) 47.56%. Machhrauli had an average literacy (3,048) rate of 68.44%, lower than the national average of 74%. 12.95% of the population is under 6 (577).Most of the population of the village is Hindu Jaat and widely spoken language is Haryanvi.

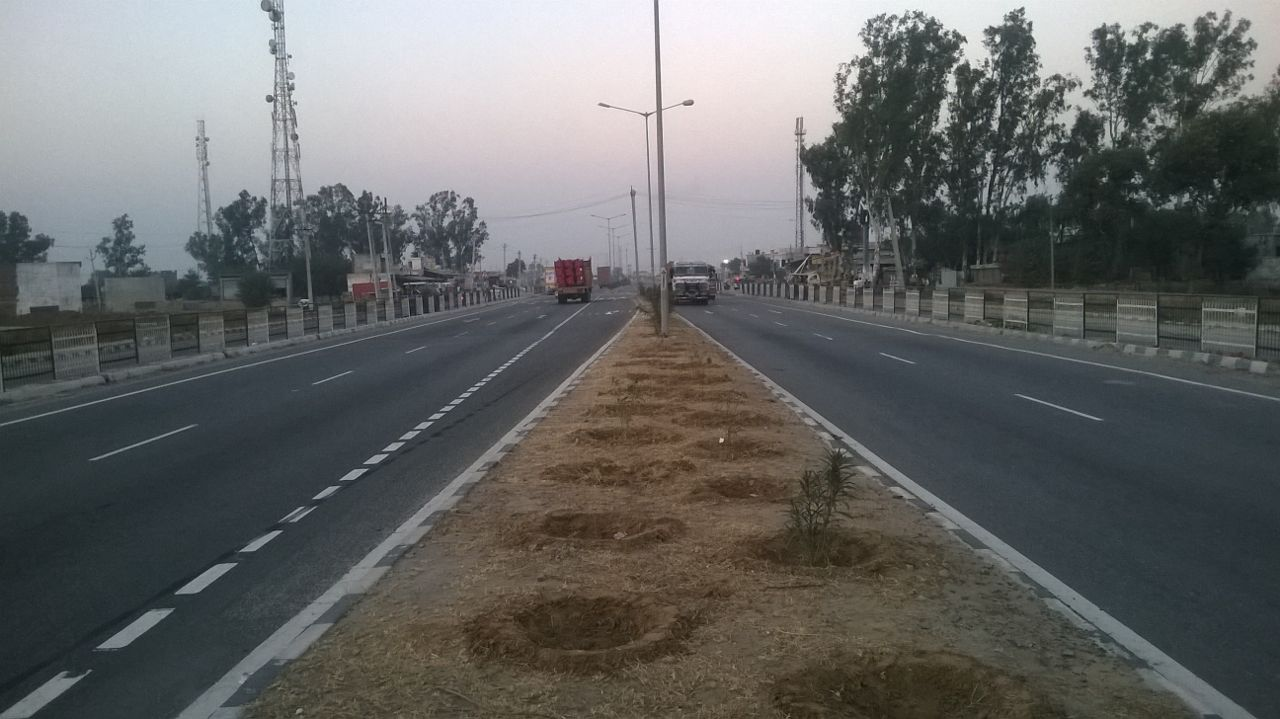
National Highway 71 in Machhrauli

== Education ==
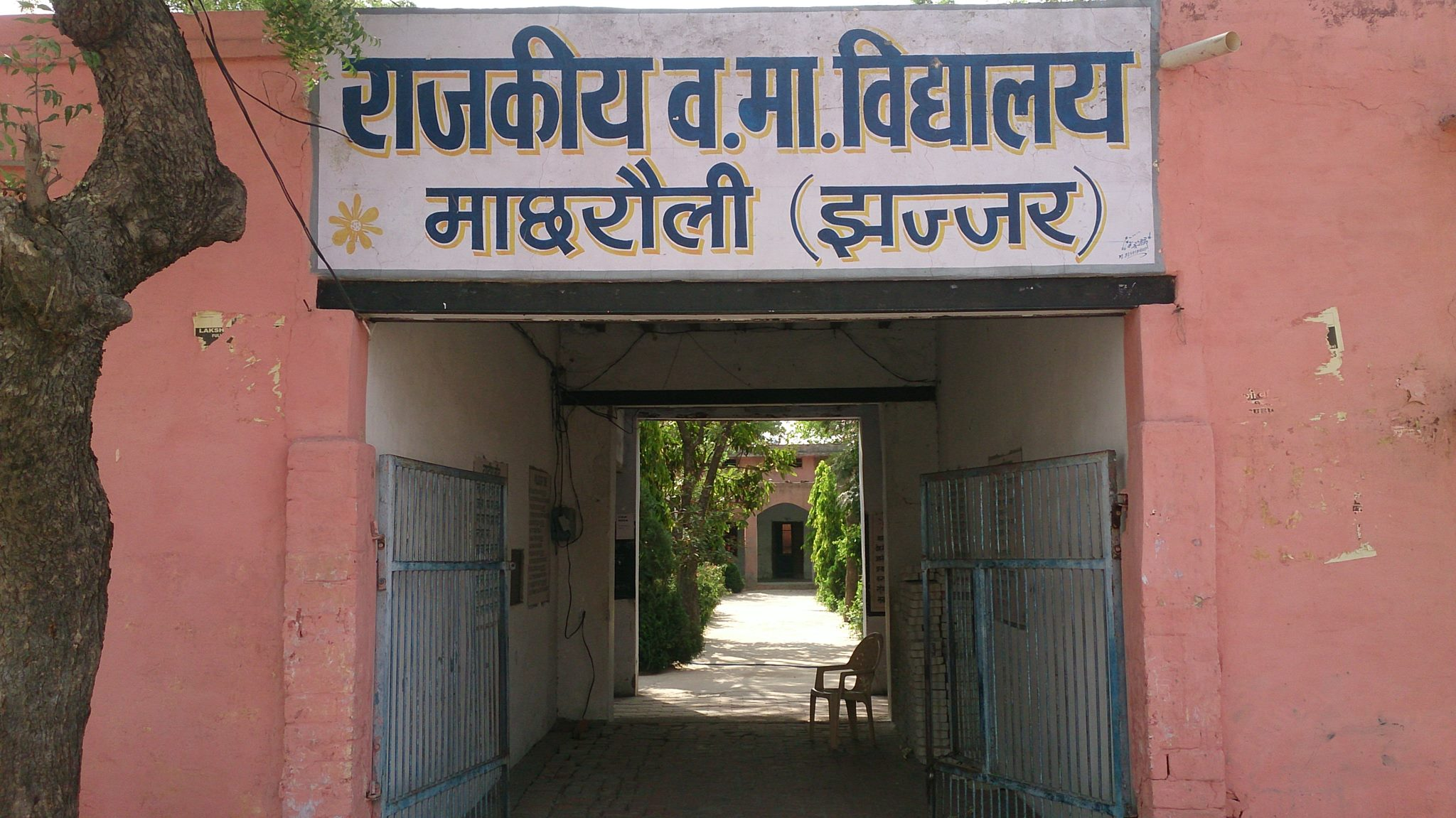
govt. sr. sec. school machhrauli

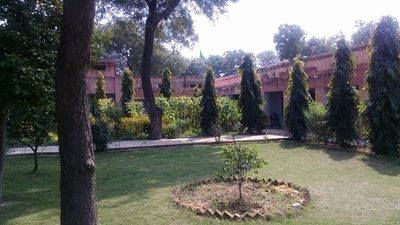
Courtyard of the School

The village has a government senior secondary school with almost 600 Students. The school has a playground and basketball court. The school is affiliated to Haryana Board of School Education Bhiwani. Students can complete their 12th grade level education in Science, Arts and Commerce.

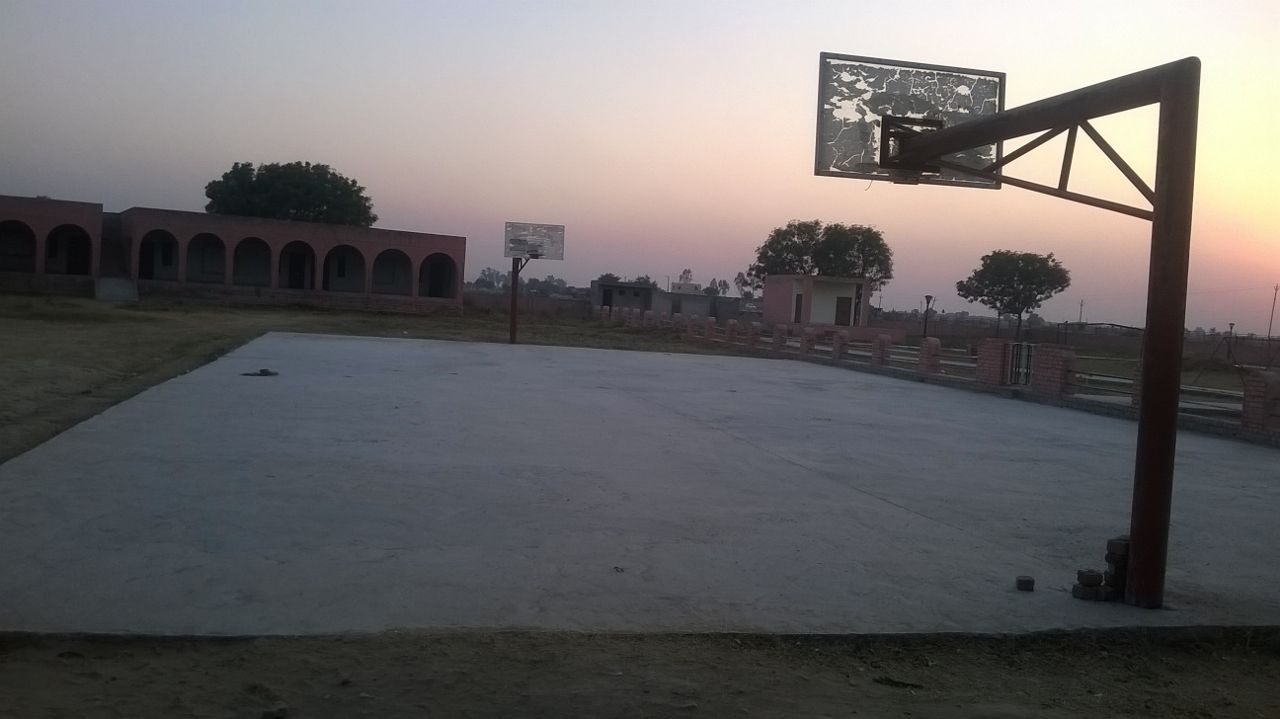
Basketball Court

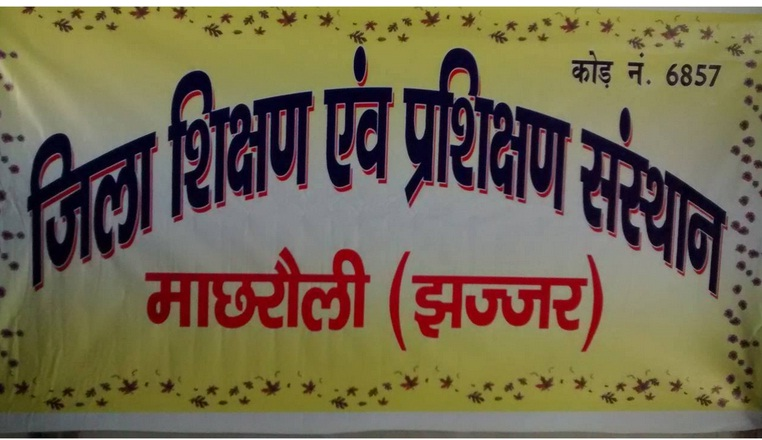
jbt machhrauli

District Institute of Education and Training was established on June 17, 2014. Its main course is JBT (Junior Basic Training), a diploma level course.

== Transport ==
Machhrauli has a railway station on Rewari-Rohtak line. Trains for Rohtak and Rewari are available. This railway station was inaugurated by Deepnder singh hooda MP rohtak Constituency and Bhupinder singh hooda on January 8, 2013.

Time Table For Machhrauli Railway Station
Train No.	Source	Destination	Arrival	Departure
54019	Rewari	Rohtak	05:37	05:38
74018	Rohtak	Rewari	06:05	06:06
74015	Rewari	Jind	07:41	07:42
74016	Jind	Rewari	18:34	18:35
74017	Rewari	Rohtak	20:23	20:30
54020	Rohtak	Rewari	20:27	20:28

== See also ==
In State of Haryana four similar Villages exist, including the village of Jhajjar District.

- In Haryana (State), Panipat (District), Samalkha(Sub District), Machhrouli (VILLAGE)
- In Haryana (State), Yamunanagar (District), Bilaspur (Sub District), Machhrauli (VILLAGE)
- In Haryana (State), Kurukshetra (District), Thanesar (Sub District), Machhrauli (VILLAGE)
- In Haryana (State), Jhajjar (District), Jhajjar (Sub District), Machhrauli (VILLAGE)
