= Asthal Bohar Junction railway station =

Railway station in Haryana, India

Asthal Bohar Junction
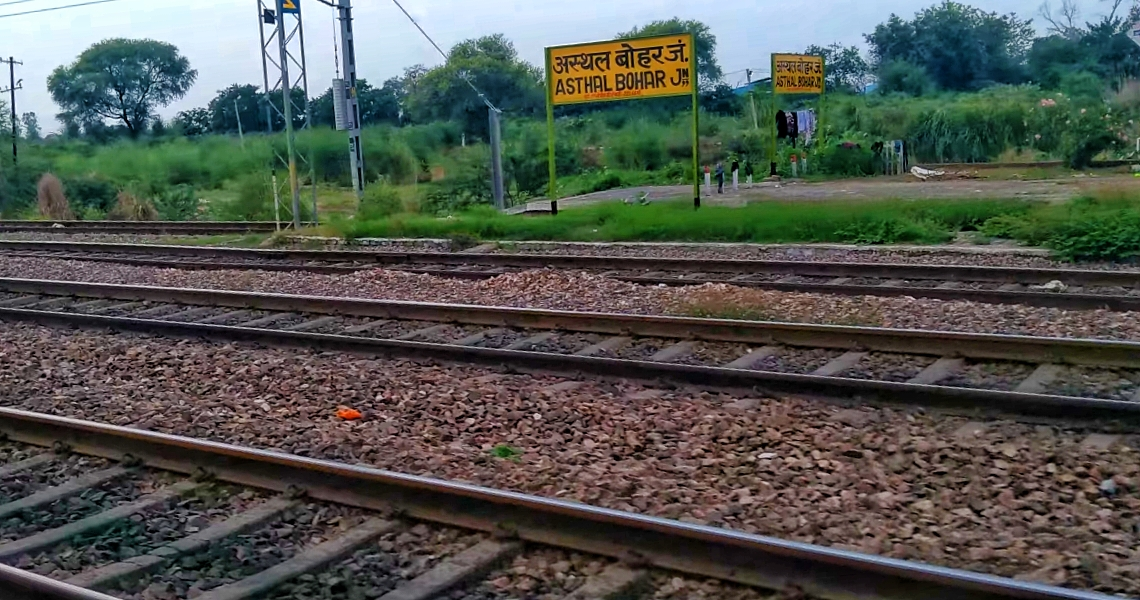
- Asthal Bohar Junction Railway Station

General information
- Location: Asthal Bohar, Haryana; India
- Coordinates: 28.8581714°N 76.6268394°E
- Elevation: 222 metres (728 ft)
- System: Indian Railway Station
- Owner: Indian Railways
- Operator: North Western Railway
- Line: Delhi–Rohtak line

Construction
- Structure type: Standard on ground

Other information
- Status: Functioning
- Station code: ABO
Location
- Location within Haryana

Asthal Bohar Junction Railway Station is a station on the Delhi–Rohtak line. It is located in the Indian state of Haryana. It serves Asthal Bohar and the surrounding areas.

== See also ==
- List of railway stations in Haryana

Preceding station	Indian Railways	Following station
Rohtak Junction towards Fazilka	Northern Railway zone Delhi–Fazilka line	Kharawar towards Old Delhi
