= Jhajjar Power Station =

Thermal power station in Haryana

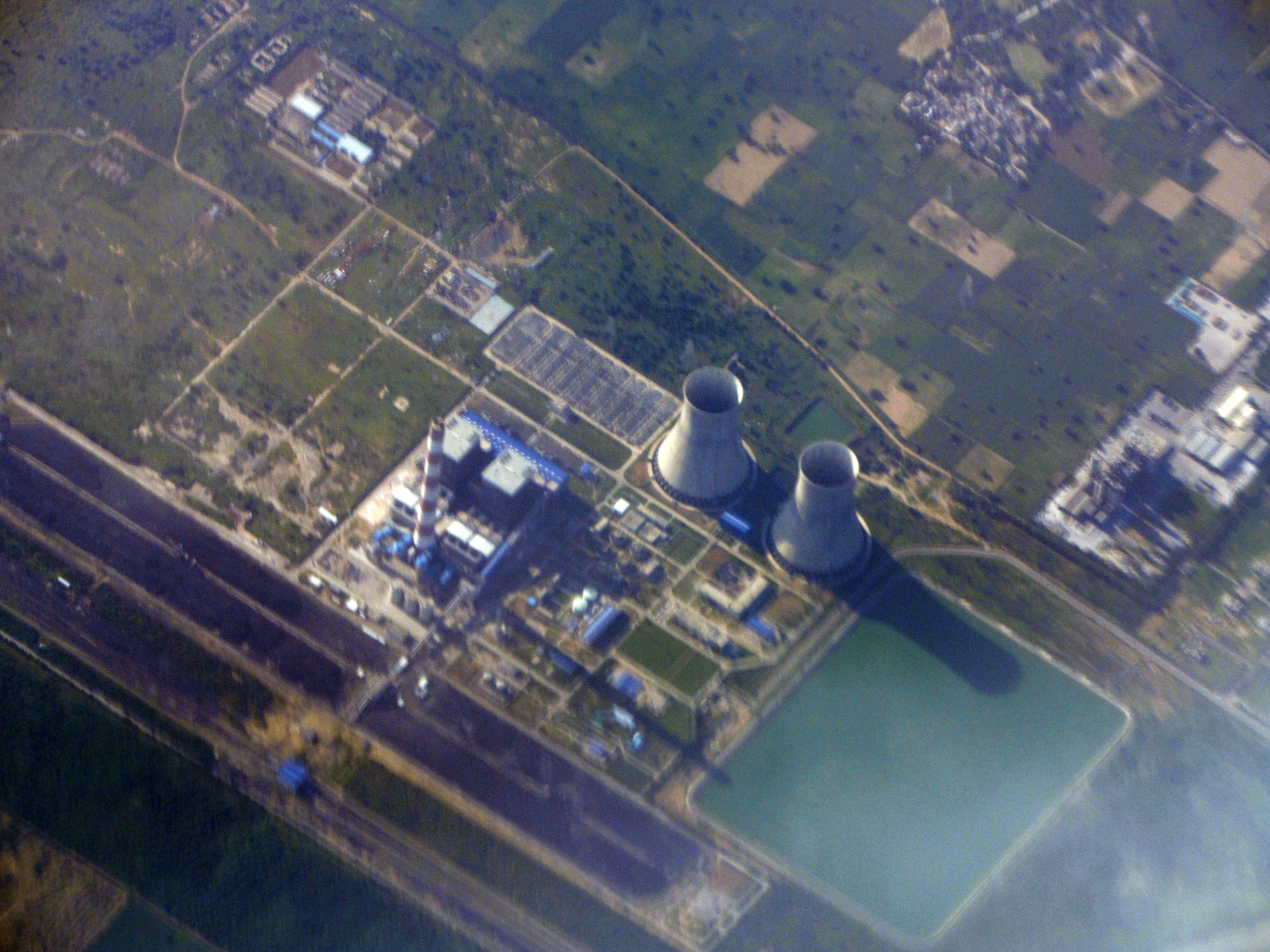
- Country: India
- Location: Khanpur, Jhajjar District
- Coordinates: 28°29′21″N 76°21′05″E
- Status: Operational
- Commission date: 19 July 2012
- Operator: CLP India Private Limited

Thermal power station
- Primary fuel: Coal

Power generation
- Units operational: 2 × 660 MW
- Nameplate capacity: 1,320 MW

External links
- Website: www.clpindia.in/operations_jhajjar.html
- Commons: Related media on Commons

Mahatma Gandhi Super Thermal Power Project is located at Jharli village in Jhajjar district of Haryana. The coal based power project was developed by CLP India Private Limited, a subsidiary of CLP Group.

== Capacity ==
Stage	Unit Number	Installed Capacity (MW)	Date of Commissioning	Status
Stage I	1	660	2012 March	Running
Stage II	2	660	2012 July	Running

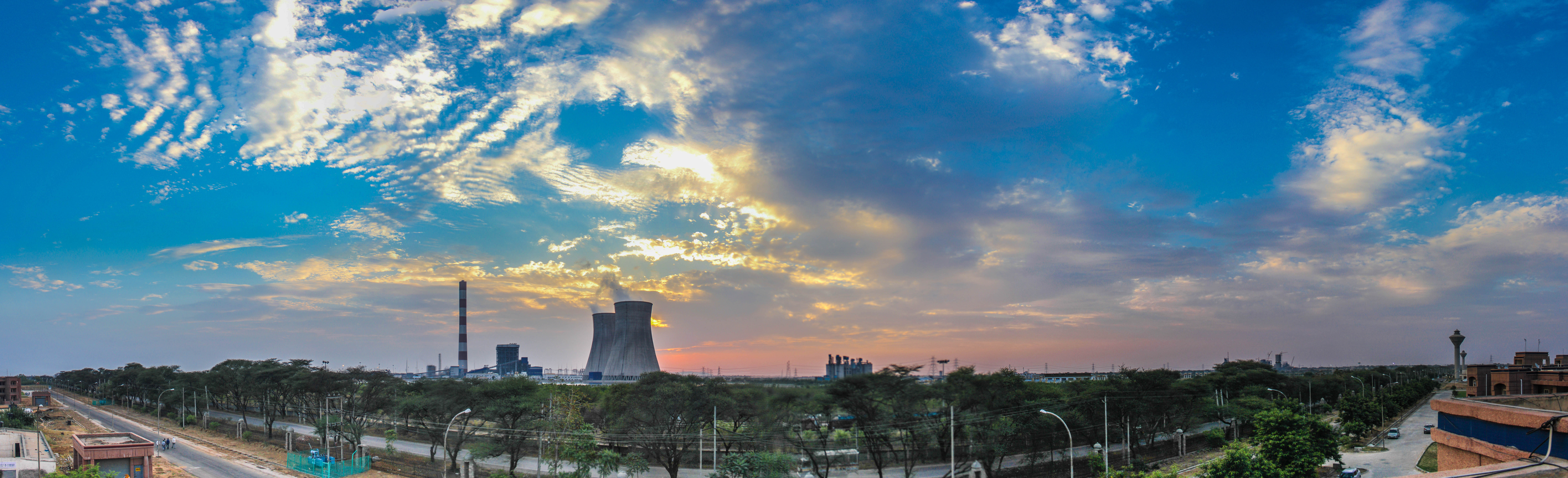
The two cooling towers of the Jhajjar Power Station

== See also ==
- List of power stations in India
