= Asthal Bohar =

Bohar
- Village
- Location in Haryana, India Bohar (India)
- Coordinates: 28.873°N 76.642°E
- Country: India
- State: Haryana
- District: Rohtak

Population (2011)
  - Total: 11,267 of Bohar and 2,894 of Garhi Bohar
- Time zone: UTC+05:30 (IST)
- ISO 3166 code: IN-HR
- Vehicle registration: HR

Asthal Bohar, also known as Bohar, is a village on the outskirts of Rohtak city in Rohtak District, Haryana, India. Asthal means Bairagi Monastery. Jain, Nath Shaivite and Brahminical images were found in Asthal Bohr monastery. A seventh century AD statue of Parshvanatha, twenty-third Jain tirthankara, was found in the village.

It has a railway station on Rewari-Rohtak line.
