= Bhaproda =

- Village
- Location in Haryana, India
- Coordinates: 28.7361°N 76.7361°E
- Country: India
- State: Haryana
- District: Jhajjar District

Languages
  - Official: Hindi
- Time zone: UTC+5:30 (IST)
- PIN: 124503
- Nearest city: Bahadurgarh
- Lok Sabha constituency: Rohtak
- Vidhan Sabha constituency: Beri

Bhaproda is a village in the Bahadurgarh tehsil in Jhajjar district of the Indian state of Haryana. Located on the Sampla–Jhajjar road, 4 kilometers (2.5 mi) from the National Highway 10 intersection, Bhaproda has a total population of 6,902 as per 2011 census.
