= Rohtak–Rewari DEMU =

Indian passenger train service

Rohtak–Rewari DMU
Overview
- Service type: Passenger
- Locale: Haryana
- First service: 2015
- Current operator: Northern Railway

Route
- Termini: Rohtak Junction railway station Rewari Junction railway station
- Stops: 13
- Distance travelled: 81 km (50 mi)
- Average journey time: 2h
- Service frequency: Daily
- Train number: 79305UP / 79306DN

On-board services
- Class: DMU
- Seating arrangements: Yes
- Sleeping arrangements: Yes

Technical
- Track gauge: BG
- Operating speed: 40 km/h (25 mph) average with halts

Rohtak–Rewari DEMU is a passenger train service of Indian Railways which runs between Rohtak Junction railway station and Rewari Junction railway station in Haryana. This train is India's first CNG train which was flagged off on 14 January 2015, by Union Minister for Railways Suresh Prabhu.

== Arrival and departure ==
- Train no.74018 departs from Rohtak Junction, daily at 05:00, reaching Rewari the same day at 07:00.
- Train no.74015 departs from Rewari daily at 07:10, from platform no.1 reaching Rohtak Junction the same day at 09:25.

== Route and halts ==
The train goes via Jhajjar. The important stops of the train are:

- Rohtak Junction railway station
- Asthal Bohar Junction railway station
- Dighal railway station
- Jhajjar railway station
- Machhrauli railway station
- Palhawas railway station
- Gokalgarh railway station
- Rewari Junction railway station

== Average speed and frequency ==
The train runs with an average speed of 40 km/h and completes 81 km in 2h. The train runs on a daily basis.
