= Girdharpur, Jhajjar =

Girdharpur Girdharpur, Jhajjar
- Village
- Location in Haryana, India Girdharpur (India)
- Country: India
- State: Haryana
- Region: North India
- District: Jhajjar

Languages
  - Official: Hindi
- Time zone: UTC+5:30 (IST)
- PIN: 124109
- ISO 3166 code: IN-HR
- Vehicle registration: HR-14
- Website: haryana.gov.in

Girdharpur is a village located in Jhajjar district in the Indian state of Haryana.

== Demographics ==
In 2011, the population was 1,062.

== Religion ==
Majority of the residents are Hindu, with Jats being the dominant social group.

== Notable persons ==
Hon. Capt. Jai Lal Singh - winner of Military Cross, 1914–15.

== Zila Parshad ==
MONIKA MALHAN

== See also ==
- Sarola
- Subana
- Khudan
- Chhapar, Jhajjar
- Dhakla, Jhajjar
