= Bahadurgarh tehsil =

Bahadurgarh बहादुरगढ
- Tehsil
- Location in Haryana, India
- Coordinates: 28.68°N 76.92°E
- Country: India
- State: Haryana
- District: Jhajjar
- Division: Rohtak

Bahadurgarh is a tehsil of Jhajjar district in Haryana, India. It was a part of Rohtak district till 1997 when Jhajjar district was carved out of Rohtak district. Bahadurgarh serves as the tehsil headquarters.

== List of villages ==
1. Bahadurgarh
2. Mandothi
3. Nuna majra
4. Sankhol
5. Rohad
6. Balour
7. Barktabad
8. Kheri Jasour
9. Dahkora
10. Jasour Kheri
11. Nilothi
12. Ladrawan
13. Kulasi
14. Kanonda
15. Shadpur
16. Parnala
17. Barahi
18. Asoudha Siwan
19. Asoudha Todran
20. Bhaproda
21. Kharhar
22. Chhara
23. Silothi
24. Kharman
25. Chhudani
26. Asanda
27. Mehandipur
28. Tandaheri
29. Kherka Musulman
30. Lowa khurd
31. Kasar
32. Lowa Kalan
33. Shidipur
34. Isharheri
35. Soldha
36. Loharheri
37. Khairpur
38. Bamnauli
39. Hassanpur
40. Jakhoda
41. Majra Asanda
42. Mattan
43. Rewari Khera
44. Mukandpur
45. Agarpur
46. Sarai Aurangabad
