= Paradise Public School =

Paradise Public School was established as subsidiary branch of Paradise Coaching Center in year 2011 in the Club Road of Aurangabad in Bihar state. It has the slogan "School with the Difference". The director of this school is civil engineer Krishna Sharma, After creating milestone in coaching world of Bihar, Paradise Coaching Center decided to start a school.

Name	Paradise Public School
Director	Er. Krishna Sharma
Year	2011
Head Office	Club Road, Aurangabad
Branch Of	Paradise Coaching Center
Logo	Paradise Public School

== Headquarters ==
The school's headquarters is in Club Road, Aurangabad, Bihar
