= Chhara Port =

- Click on the map for a fullscreen view

Location
- Country: India
- Location: Chhara, Gujarat, India
- Coordinates: 20.7224997°N 70.7317765°E

Details
- Opened: 2024
- Operated by: Simar Port Private Limited
- Owned by: Gujarat Maritime Board
- Type of harbour: All weather port
- Draft depth: 12.5 metres (41 ft)
- Length of approach channel: 7 kilometres (4.3 mi)

The Chhara Port is a seaport in Gir Somnath district of Gujarat, India. The port is situated on the shores of the Arabian Sea. It is about 50 kilometres (31 mi) West of Diu. Chhara Port was commissioned in the 2024 with an LNG Terminal.
