= Niwada =

Indian Village

Niwada is a small village near the Bhindawas Bird Sanctuary in the district of Jhajjar in the Indian state of Haryana. It is surrounded by the villages of Dhakla, Kasni, Kanwah, Redhuwas and Kohndrawali. The population is primarily composed of the Jat community with the title "Mor" (Gautra). Decisions in the village are made by the Panchayat Officer, called Sarpanch, on the advice of the Panchayat of the village.

== Geography ==
Niwada is located at 28°31'12.0"N 76°33'06.1"E. It has an average elevation of 220 metres (722 feet).

== Demographics ==
Niwada had 194 households and a population of 1009 of which 541(53.61%) are males while 468(46.38%) are females(2011 Census). Literacy rate of Niwada village was 73.71% compared to 75.55% of Haryana and national of 74%.Niwada has an average literacy rate of Male literacy is 484(89.44%), and female literacy is 295(62.86%).

== Language ==
The native language of Niwada is Haryanvi and most people speak Haryanvi. People of Niwada use Hindi & English languages for their official communications.

== Transport ==
Niwada is well connected by road with all parts of the nation.15 km away from Jhajjar.

Jhajjar Railway station is the nearest railway station which is about 15 km away. The nearest Airport is Indira Gandhi International Airport, New Delhi at a distance of 83 km.

== Economy ==
Agriculture is the main source of income. Some inhabitants serve in the Army, Navy and Air Force, some serve in the central and state police, and some in the civil service.

== Politics ==
People of this village supported the rule of a well-known political leader from Haryana. At one time, he received 100% of the village vote; he responded by developing the village and fulfilled the basic needs of the villagers. After his death, his son Omparkash Chautala emerged as a leader from his party, Indian National Lokdal and was given the village's support. However, he lost the trust of the people, resulting in a shift in political dynamics. This has led to an erosion of the village's identity.

== Games ==
Niwada was well known in Haryana for playing the game kabbadi .

== Education ==
There is one government middle school in the village.

== Health Facility ==
There is one dispensary and one veterinary hospital also available in village.
