= Apa Khande Rao =

General of Scindia dynasty in Gwalior state

Appa Khande Rao
- Shrimant Sardar
- Religion: Hindu
- Occupation: Scindia sardar

Apa Khande Rao was a general under Maharaja Mahadaji Scindia (ruled 1768–1794) of the Scindia dynasty that ruled Gwalior State. He brought Mughal emperor Shah Alam II, and most of Haryana under the control of Maratha Empire in 1790s. He joined the maratha army after the Battle of Lalsot against the Rajput kingdoms of Jaipur and Jodhpur. He had commissioned the services George Thomas (worked for Apa Khande Rao for four years from 1793 to 1797) to conquer Haryana by subduing Rajputs of Rajasthan, Kachawa Shekhawat thakur rulers of Haryana and Shekhawati, Sikhs misl of Haryana, Mughals and Bhatti Muslim Rajputs.
