= Dhakla, Jhajjar =

Dhakla
- Village
- Location in Haryana, India Dhakla (India)
- Country: India
- State: Haryana
- Region: North India
- District: Jhajjar

Languages
  - Official: Hindi
- Time zone: UTC+5:30 (IST)
- PIN: 124109
- ISO 3166 code: IN-HR
- Vehicle registration: HR-14
- Website: haryana.gov.in

Dhakla(ढाकला) is a village located in Jhajjar district in the Indian state of Haryana. It has distance of 15.5 km from Kosli Railway Station and approximately 21 km from Jhajjar Railway Station.

Health & Education: Dhakla has Community Health Centre (CHC Dhakla) with ambulance facility by State Govt. & has two Government School, One Private School.

== Demographics ==
In 2011, the population was 4,333.

== Religion ==
A majority of the residents are Hindu (Brahmins, Bania, Lohars, Carpenters, Jats, all SC ST BC castes) All OBC and others. Nearly 20 or more castes.

== Prominent residents ==
Cabinet Minister in Haryana Government O. P. Dhankar hails from Dhakla.

Ch.Badlu Ram, (Ch.Kanwal Singh Number dar, Ch.Dheer Singh Arya- Both did hardwork for whole village's Vanshavali and history of village Dhakka and both respected people of the village), DIG-ITBP Dharampal Dhankhar. Brigadier Surender Singh Dhankhar, Captain Sumit Dhankhar (first pilot from village)

== See also ==
- Sarola
- Subana
- Khudan
- Chhapar, Jhajjar
- Girdharpur, Jhajjar
