= Chhapar, Jhajjar =

Chhapar
- Village
- Location in Haryana, India Chhapar (India)
- Coordinates: 28.44°N 76.59°E
- Country: India
- State: Haryana
- District: Jhajjar

Area
  - Total: 7.32 km^{2} (2.83 sq mi)
- Elevation: 230 m (750 ft)

Population (2011)
  - Total: 2,878
  - Density: 393/km^{2} (1,020/sq mi)

Languages
  - Official: Hindi
- Time zone: UTC+5:30 (IST)
- Pincode(s): 124108

Chhapar is a small village in Jhajjar district in the state of Haryana, India. It is 32 kilometres (20 mi) from Jhajjar, which is both the District & Sub-District headquarters. It is 88 kilometres (55 mi) from New Delhi and 7 kilometres (4.3 mi) from National Highway 71 on the road from Kulana to Kosli. It had a population of 2,878 among 567 households.

There is a temple of Shri Baba Ganga Das in Chhapar.

== Language ==
The native language of Chhapar is Haryanvi and most of the village people speak Haryanvi. People of Chhapar use Hindi and English languages for their official communications.

== Transportation ==
National Highway 71 is 7.4 km away from Chhapar. The nearest railway station is Machhrauli which lies on the Rewari-Rohtak line. Rewari Junction is the nearest major railway junction which is about 40 km away. The nearest airport is Indira Gandhi International Airport at New Delhi, 77 km away.

== Education ==
There are three schools functional in the village, Govt Senior Secondary School Chhapar, S D Senior Secondary School Chhapar and Gurukul Public School Chhapar. Jhajjar, Rohtak and Delhi are the nearby options for higher education.

== Sports ==
Naveen Kumar of Chhapar is an athlete who has represented India several times. He won bronze medal at the Asian Games 2014.

Wrestling and cricket are also popular games in Chhapar and there are many National level wrestlers in the village.

== See also ==
- Girdharpur, Jhajjar
- Khudan
- Neola, Jhajjar
- Sarola
