= Beri, Jhajjar =

City in Jhajjar, Haryana, India

Beri Khas Beri Khas Jaatland Beri
- City
- Location in Haryana, India Beri Khas (India)
- Coordinates: 28.7°N 76.5833°E
- Country: India
- State: Haryana
- District: Jhajjar

Government
  - Type: District Administration Jhajjar
  - Body: Sub Divisional Magistrate (S.D.M)
- Elevation: 221 m (725 ft)

Population (2011)
  - Total: 18,215

Languages
  - Official: Hindi
- Time zone: UTC+5:30 (IST)
- PIN: 124201
- Vehicle registration: HR-77, HR-63

Beri is a city and a municipal committee in the Jhajjar district in the Indian state of Haryana. It was founded by Kadyan Jat people. The city is 4 kilometres (2.5 mi) northwest of Jhajjar city and 12 km from Rohtak and is a trading center. Beri is one of the largest tehsils of Haryana, including 77 villages. Beri is situated on the road connecting Gurgaon to Hisar and Kosli (Rewari) to Rohtak. This is the middle of these four cities. The First Chief Minister of Haryana, Bhagwat Dayal Sharma, was from Beri. The town has a temple dedicated to the goddess Mata Bhimeshwari Devi and Lord Krishna. The "Beri Pashu Mela" or "Beri Cattle Fair" is celebrated in the days of Navratra every 6 months and is known for its donkeys and horses. Beri Tehsil has 80% Jaat population. After Beri assembly established in 1967 always Jaat mla elected from this seat. Dr.Raghuvir Singh Kadyan(former speaker and minister)is current mla and elected seven times from this seat.Beri assembly comes under Rohtak lok sabha constituency. Deepender Singh Hooda is current MP from Rohtak.

== Demographics ==
As of the 2011 census, Beri had a population of about 30,000. Males constitute 54% of the population and females 46%. Beri has an average literacy rate of 70% higher than the national average of 59.5%, with 57% of the males and 43% of females literate. Thirteen percent of the population is under 6 years of age.

Religion in Beri City
Religion	Population (1911)	Percentage (1911)
Hinduism	7,093	90.96%
Islam	693	8.89%
Sikhism	4	0.05%
Christianity	1	0.01%
Others (Note: Including Jainism, Buddhism, Zoroastrianism, Judaism, others, or not stated)	7	0.09%
Total Population	7,798	100%

== Mata Bhimeshwari Devi Temple ==
In Beri a huge fair is held at the occasion of Navratra's twice in a year. In the famous temple of Bhimeshwari Devi lakhs of devotees from all over the country come and worship the goddess. In the market, hundreds of shops are decorated on the occasion of the fair. During the fair newly married couples come to tie the nuptial knot again before the goddess. The Mundan ceremony of small children is also performed here. After reaching the temple and waiting for a long queues lakhs of Devotees light the "Jyot" of desi ghee and offer coconut and parsad to the goddess. Here, after the government has taken the charge of the temple, continuous efforts have been made to beautify the temple. With devotion and faith, the devotees arrive here. It seems that Beri is not less important than any other religious places devoted to goddess Devi's chanting.

In the Beri the enhancing of goddess's name echoes all the time. According to the well-known story, it is named, Bhimeshwari due to the installation of the idol of the goddess by Bhima. According to the saying before the beginning of the battle of the Mahabharta period Shri Krishna told Mahabali Bhima to bring his Kuldevi to the battlefield of the Kurukshetra and take the blessing from her. According to the order of Shri Krishna and his brother "Yudhister", Bhima approached the Hinglaj Mountain (which is now in Pakistan) and prayed the kuldevi to move to the battle field for victory. The goddess accepted the request of Bhima but laid down a condition, she said that she was ready to go with him but if he dropped me down on the way from the lap then she would not proceed further. In the way Bhima felt the desire to go to toilet so he placed the idol of the goddess under a tree of Beri from his lap and went on, after toilet, he also felt thirsty but he could not find any water near by. Bhima blowed the earth with his gada to take out water and took bath. After that when he tried to lift the goddess, he reminded her condition, and under compulsion, Bhima placed the goddess near the bank of the pond and went to Kurukshetra after seeking the blessing for victory. After 18 days of war when Kaurva's got killed Gandhari reached the place screaming. Often said that here only Shri Krishna took out from the illusion. When Gandhari passed from there she saw her own kuldevi. After that she erected the temple here. Although the ruins of the temple erected by Gandhari are not present now, but of the seat of the great goddess is still there. Presently, marvelous temple is here. In Beri, there are two temples. The process of moving the goddess from outer to inner temple has been going on since the Mahabharta period.

At that time there was a dense forest. Maharishi Durvasa was residing in Dubaldhan around 8 kms from here in fear of thieves. Every morning at 5 a.m. Mahrishi Dhurava would bring the idol of goddess in the outer temple in his lap and at 12:00 noon again he would return it in the inner temple. The process of moving of goddess from inner to outer temple is still going on. The aarti sung by durvasa is still enchanted everyday and every evening. The " Akhand Jyoti" for 24 hrs is enlightening. also said to be City of temples and Religious City in Haryana State. The City Has around 100 Small and large Temples. The Mata Bhimeshwari Temple, Bala Ji Temple, Radha Krishna mandir main bazaar are main temples in the city. People also come to the temple on foot from long distances.

== Notable people ==
- Raghuvir Singh Kadian — MLA of Beri
- B. D. Sharma — first Chief Minister of Haryana
