= Rewari–Rohtak line =

Railway line in India

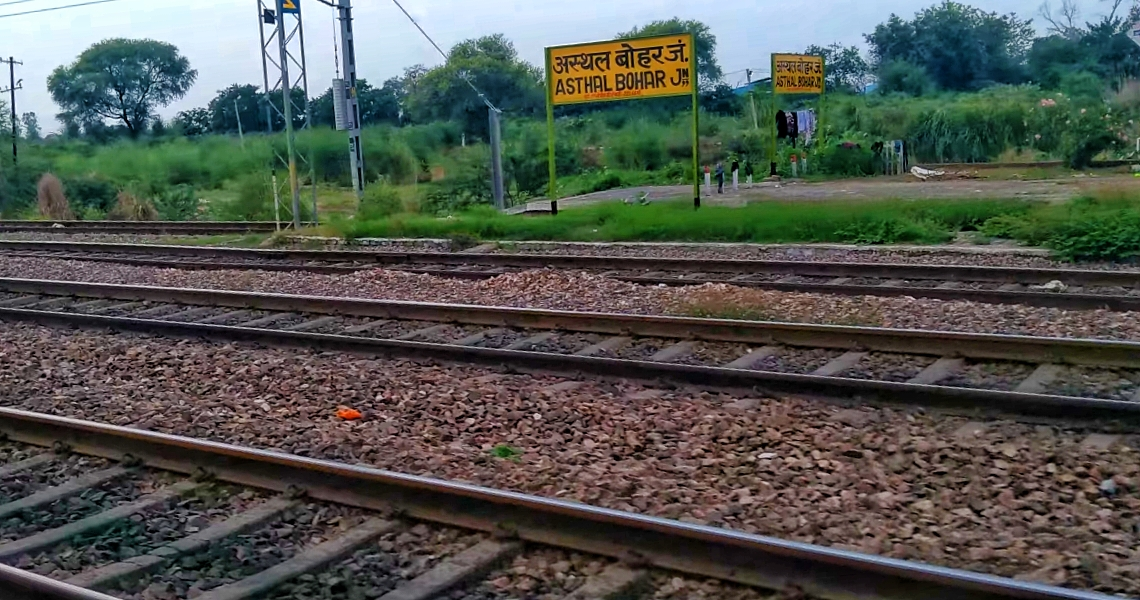
- Asthal bohar Junction is an important Railway Station on Rewari–Rohtak line

Overview
- Status: Operational
- Owner: Indian Railways
- Locale: Haryana
- Termini: Rewari Junction; Rohtak Junction

Service
- Operator: Northern Railway zone

History
- Opened: 8 January 2013; 13 years ago

Technical
- Track length: 81.3 km (51 mi)
- Number of tracks: 1
- Track gauge: 5 ft 6 in (1,676 mm) broad gauge
- Operating speed: 100 km/h (62 mph)

The Rewari–Rohtak line is a railway line that connects Rewari and Rohtak in the Indian state of Haryana. Train services on this line started on 8 January 2013.

== Overview ==
The railway line was the first new railway project in Haryana in thirty-three years. The project was sanctioned in 2004–2005 with an estimated cost of ₹4.76 billion (US$49 million) but the final cost was ₹6.02 billion (US$63 million). Construction began on 7 October 2007.

A new 75 km-long railway line was constructed between Asthal Bohar station that lies on Rohtal–Delhi railway line and Rewari via Jhajjar. The construction required 124 bridges over canals, drains and irrigation water courses, 36 level crossings, 32 limited-height subways and 4 bridges over roads. The length of the Rewari–Rohtak railway line is 81.3 km including 6.1 km from Rohtak to Asthal Bohar station.

== Stations ==
There are six stations between Rohtak and Rewari. These are Asthal Bohar (station code ABO) at 6.1 km, Dighal (DGHL) at 20.4 km, Jhajjar (JHJ) at 37.1 km, Machhrauli (MHRI) at 49.0 km, Palhawas (PLHW) at 63.3 km and Gokalgarh (GKG) at 75.9 km.

== Trains ==
Two DEMU trains (one of which runs on CNG) and one passenger train run on this line stopping at all stations en route. There is a demand that another train from Rohtak to Rewari be introduced that will return to Rohtak in the evening.

Two express trains connecting Chandigarh with Jaipur also run on this railway line.

=== CNG train ===
India's first train running on compressed natural gas (CNG) started on Rewari–Rohtak line in January 2015. Its train numbers are 74017 from Rewari and 74018 from Rohtak.

== Future developments ==
This line is part of the following proposed NCR's Regional Orbital Rail Corridor (RORC) will pass through here:

- Panipat–Rohtak line, via Panipat–Gohana–Rohtak, existing.
- Rohtak–Rewari line, via Rohtak–Jhajjar-Rewari, existing.
- Rewari–Khurja line, via Rewari–Palwal–Bhiwadi–Khurja, new rail line, survey completed.
- Khurja–Meerut line, via Khurja–Bulandshahr–Hapur–Meerut, existing.
- Meerut–Panipat line, new rail line, survey completed.
