= Sarola =

- Village
- Nicknames: Sarola, Jhajjar
- Location in Haryana, India Sarola (India)
- Country: India
- State: Haryana
- Region: North India
- District: Jhajjar

Languages
  - Official: Hindi
- Time zone: UTC+5:30 (IST)
- PIN: 124108
- ISO 3166 code: IN-HR
- Vehicle registration: HR-14
- Website: haryana.gov.in

Sarola is a village located in Salhawas Block of Jhajjar district in Haryana. Sarpanch of Sarola is Bhupendra. Chandigarh is the state capital for Sarola village. It is located around 255.0 kilometers away from Sarola. The surrounding nearby villages and its distance from Sarola are Khudan 1.8 km, Chhapar 2.1 km, Subana 2.8 km, Ahari 3.7 km, Babepur 4.2 km, Dhakla 4.2 km, Kasni 4.7 km.

== Demographics ==
In 2011, the population was 1407. The native language of Sarola is Hindi. Sarola people use Hindi, Haryanvi language for communication.

=== Caste wise male female population 2011 ===
	Total	General	Schedule Caste	Child
Total	1,407	1,124	283	164
Male	755	596	159	100
Female	652	528	124	64

== Religion ==
Majority of the residents are Hindu, with Ahir being the dominant social group. A famous Mata Mandir is situated in this village.

== Gram Panchayat of Sarola Village ==
Name	Des. & Ward
Sahil Rani	Sarpanch
Madhu Bala	Panch -1
Upender	Panch -2
Om Kala	Panch -3
Jitender Kumar	Panch -4
Promila Devi	Panch -5
Raj Kumar	Panch -6
Sushil	Panch -7
Rajender Singh	Panch -8

== School in Sarola ==
GHS Sarola

== See also ==
- Khudan
- Chhapar, Jhajjar
- Dhakla, Jhajjar
