= Jhajjar =

City in Haryana, India

- Town
- Location of Jhajjar in Haryana Jhajjar (India)
- Coordinates: 28°36′20″N 76°39′20″E
- Country: India
- State: Haryana
- District: Jhajjar

Government
  - Type: Municipal Council
  - Body: Jhajjar Municipal Council
- Elevation: 220 m (720 ft)

Population (2011)
  - Total: 48,424
- Vehicle registration: HR-14
- Website: jhajjar.nic.in

Jhajjar is a town in Jhajjar district in the Indian state of Haryana. It is a part of Delhi National Capital Region (NCR) and situated on the road connecting Rewari to Rohtak (NH-352), Loharu to Meerut (NH334B), Charkhi Dadri to Delhi and Gurgaon to Bhiwani. Jhajjar is located 55 km (34 mi) west of Delhi.

== History ==
Jhajjar is listed in the Ain-i-Akbari as a pargana under Delhi sarkar, producing a revenue of 1,422,451 dams for the imperial treasury and supplying a force of 1000 infantry and 60 cavalry. Jhajjar was founded by a Gahlawat Jat, Chaudhary Chajju Singh in medieval era.

The town was destroyed in 12-century by Muhammad Ghori during his Indian invasions and later refounded by a Jat clan.

In1762, Jat ruler Suraj Mal of Bharatpur State conquered the region. After the death of Jat ruler Jawahar Singh, his successor Nawal Singh allotted Jhajjar to Walter Reinhardt in recognition of his military services.

In 1771, Mahadji Scindia of the Maratha Empire restored the Mughal emperor Shah Alam II to Delhi and Jhajjar came under the control of the Marathas. In 1793, the Scindias appointed Apa Khande Rao as their military governor in the Haryana region. Apa Khande Rao recruited the Irish adventurer George Thomas and as payment for military service, Apa Khande Rao granted George Thomas the jagirs of Beri and Jhajjar in 1794, while Apa himself continued to hold authority as the Scindia representative. George Thomas constructed a fort known as Georgegah, which was locally known as Jahazgarh.

After the Second Anglo-Maratha War in 1803, Jhajjar region was granted to Najabat Khan by the British East India Company in recognition of his services to them during the war of 1803 against the Marathas. His son, Faiz Muhammad Khan did extensive development in region. However, the estate was confiscated by the British in 1857 as the ruling chief, Nawab Abdur Rahman Khan, who was hanged for taking part in the Indian rebellion of 1857. Thereafter Jhajjar municipality was created in 1867.

== Demographics ==
According to 2011 Indian census, Jhajjar town had a total population of 48424, of which 25678 were males and 22746 were females.

=== Religion ===
==== City ====
Religion in Jhajjar City
Religion	Population (1911)	Percentage (1911)	Population (1941)	Percentage (1941)	Population (2011)	Percentage (2011)
Hinduism (Note: 1941 census: Including Ad-Dharmis)	5,948	56.02%	6,576	47.24%	47,711	98.53%
Islam	4,614	43.46%	7,188	51.64%	369	0.76%
Sikhism	2	0.02%	80	0.57%	122	0.25%
Christianity	4	0.04%	2	0.01%	29	0.06%
Others (Note: Including Jainism, Buddhism, Zoroastrianism, Judaism, or not stated)	49	0.46%	73	0.52%	193	0.4%
Total Population	10,617	100%	100%	100%	48,424	100%

==== Tehsil ====
Religion in Jhajjar Tehsil
Religion	Population (1941)	Percentage (1941)
Hinduism	230,090	88.63%
Islam	29,132	11.22%
Sikhism	176	0.07%
Christianity	48	0.02%
Others (Note: Including Jainism, Buddhism, Zoroastrianism, Judaism, or not stated)	174	0.07%
Total Population	259,620	100%

== Government and politics ==
Geeta Bhukkal from the Indian National Congress (INC) is the current MLA of Jhajjar.

== Transportation ==
Jhajjar has its own railway station, with code JHJ. The railway station of the city is situated on Delhi-Jhajjar-Dadri Road. The station supports four trains, including the first CNG train of India and the Jaipur-Chandigarh Intercity train.

== Notable people ==
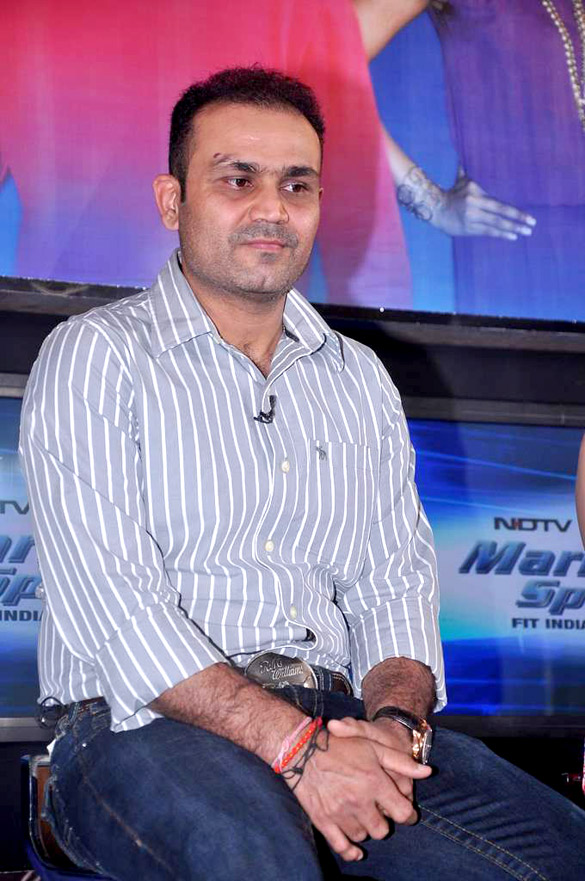
Virendra Sehwag in 2012

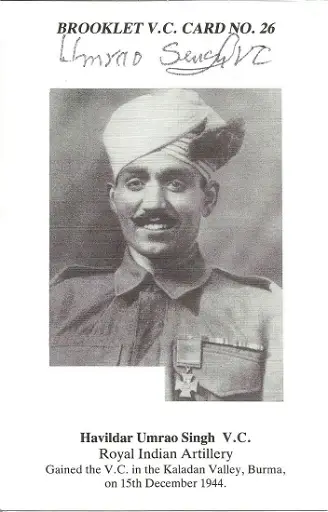
Umrao Singh Yadav, Indian recipient of the Victoria Cross (VC), the highest and most prestigious award for gallantry in the face of the enemy that can be awarded to British and Commonwealth forces

- Umrao Singh, Indian recipient of the Victoria Cross (VC), the highest and most prestigious award for gallantry in the face of the enemy that can be awarded to British and Commonwealth forces.
- Geeta Bhukkal
- Manu Bhaker
- Manushi Chhillar
- Ravi Dahiya
- Naveen Kumar
- Bajrang Punia
- Swami Omanand Saraswati
- Virender Sehwag
- Rohit Sharma
- Dalbir Singh
- Ravinder Singh

== Notable schools ==
- DAV Public School
- Jawahar Navodaya Vidyalaya
- Kendriya Vidyalaya
- New Era High School
- Paradise Public School
- Sehwag International School
- St. Francis De Sales School

== See also ==
- Bahadurgarh
- Beri, Jhajjar
- Badli, Jhajjar
- Gudha
