= Khudan =

- Village
- Location in Haryana, India Khudan (India)
- Country: India
- State: Haryana
- Region: North India
- District: Jhajjar

Languages
  - Official: Hindi
- Time zone: UTC+5:30 (IST)
- PIN: 124108
- ISO 3166 code: IN-HR
- Vehicle registration: HR-14
- Website: haryana.gov.in

Khudan is a village located in Jhajjar district in the Indian state of Haryana.

== Demographics ==
In 2011 the population was 4793.

== Religion ==
Majority of the residents are Hindu by faith. There is a temple of Swami Nityanand Maharaj and an old Shiva temple.

== Prominent residents ==
The multiple international medal winner wrestler Bajrang Punia hails from Khudan.

Mandeep Punia is A freelancer journalist from village khudan. He is deeply covered Farmer protest 2021.
