= Jhajjar district =

Coordinates: 28°36′36″N 76°39′36″E

- District of Haryana
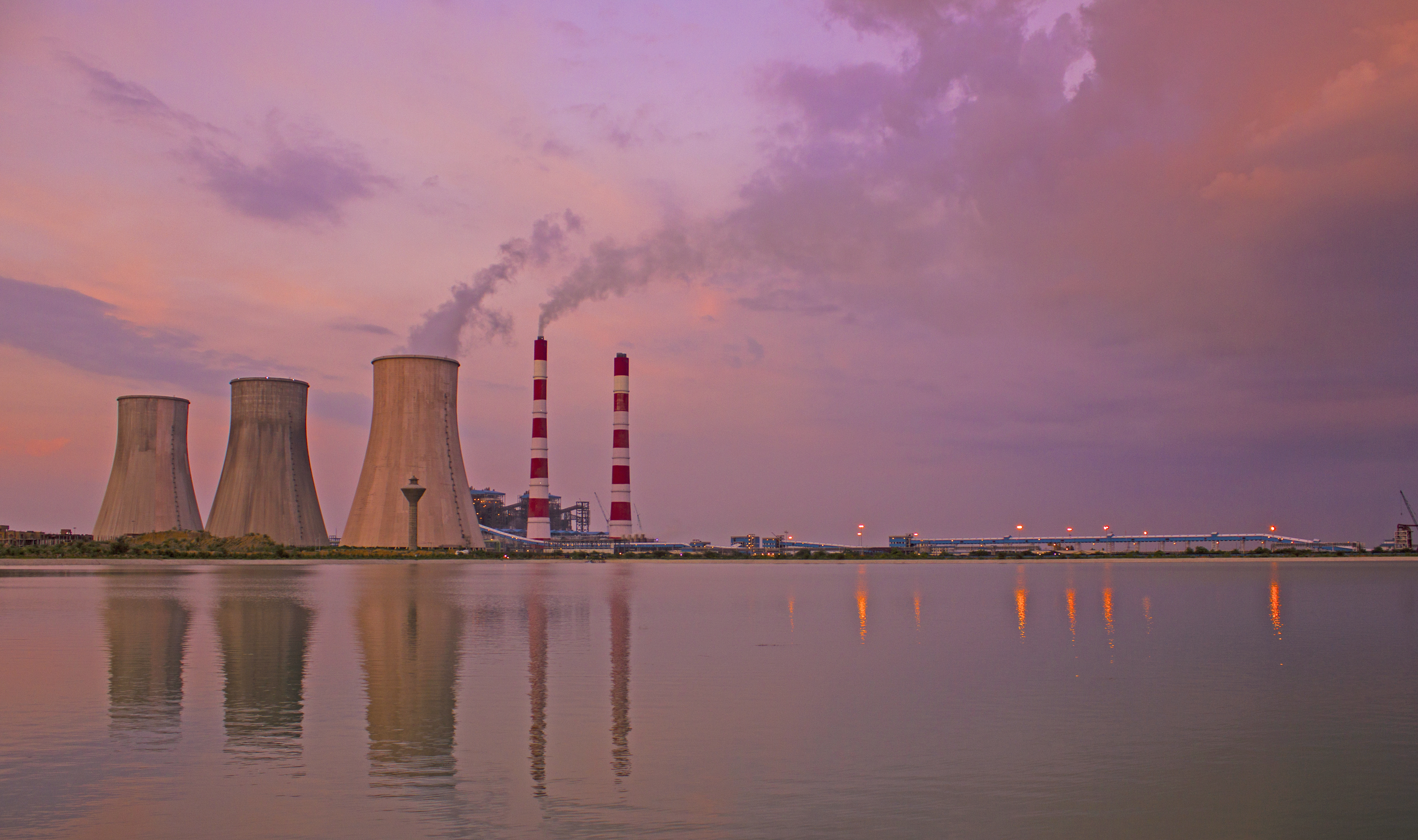
- Jhajjar Power Station

- Location in Haryana
- Country: India
- State: Haryana
- Headquarters: Jhajjar
- Tehsils: Jhajjar; Bahadurgarh; Badli; Beri Matanhail

Area
  - Total: 1,834 km^{2} (708 sq mi)

Population (2011)
  - Total: 958,405
  - Density: 522.6/km^{2} (1,353/sq mi)
  - Urban: 22.17%
- Time zone: UTC+05:30 (IST)
- Vehicle registration: HR 14
- Major highways: NH9 and NH71
- Lok Sabha constituencies: Rohtak (shared with Rohtak and Rewari districts)
- Vidhan Sabha constituencies: 4
- Website: jhajjar.nic.in

Jhajjar district is one of the 23 districts of Haryana state in northern India. Carved out of Rohtak district on 15 July 1997 and with its headquarters in Jhajjar, it lies 29 kilometres (18 mi) from Delhi and had developed into an important industrial center. Other towns in the district are Bahadurgarh, Badli and Beri. Bahadurgarh is the major city of the district and state. Bahadurgarh is known as 'The City of Destiny'. Beri used to be a village fifty years ago.

The district occupies an area of 1,834 square kilometres (708 sq mi) and as of 2001 its population was 709,000. It has two industrial areas with over 3,300 industries. Basic industries are ceramics, glass, chemicals, engineering, electrical and electronics. Bahadurgarh is the major Industrial area of the district with over 2800 medium size industries and 200 large-scale industries. There are 3,300 units representing a total investment of Rs. 40,000 million. Major crops grown here are rice, wheat and maize. The total irrigated agricultural land area is about 670 square kilometres (260 sq mi).

Jhajjar was founded by Chaudhary Chaju Singh, a Gehlot Jat, as Chajunagar, which was later changed to Jhajjar. Alternatively, it may be derived from Jharnaghar, meaning a natural fountain or Jhajjar, a water vessel, because the surface drainage of the country for miles around runs into the town as into a sink.

== History ==
On 15 July 1997, Jhajjar district was carved out of Rohtak district.

There is group of medieval tombs in Jhajjar city and a stepwell at Luhari (8km northwest of Pataudi on SH-132) known as Luhari Baoli (also Muglaai Baoli).

== Demographics ==
Historical population
Year	Pop.	±% p.a.
1901	220,225	—
1911	189,979	−1.47%
1921	204,808	+0.75%
1931	213,977	+0.44%
1941	253,298	+1.70%
1951	295,085	+1.54%
1961	375,209	+2.43%
1971	479,482	+2.48%
1981	589,212	+2.08%
1991	715,136	+1.96%
2001	880,072	+2.10%
2011	958,405	+0.86%

As of the 2011 census Jhajjar district had a population of 958,405, roughly equal to the nation of Fiji or the US state of Montana. This gives it a ranking of 456th in India (out of a total of 640). The district has a population density of 522 inhabitants per square kilometre (1,350/sq mi). Its population growth rate over the decade 2001-2011 was 8.73%. Jhajjar has a sex ratio of 782 females for every 1,000 males, and a literacy rate of 80.8%. Scheduled Castes make up 17.78% of the population.

Jat is the dominant caste in the district. According to census 2011, Jhajjar city had a population of 48,424, Beri has 15,934, and the major city of the district Bahadurgarh had 170,767.

In the 2011 National Census, it was found that Jhajjar district has the lowest sex ratio in India of the 0–6 group, with just 782 girls to 1,000 boys. Two villages in Jhajjar have extremely low gender-ratios: Bahrana and Dimana have gender ratios of 378 girls to 1,000 boys and 444 girls to 1,000 boys respectively. In Jhajjar, parents are able to illegally learn the gender of the fetus through secret early morning ultrasounds at registered clinics and through the use of code-words, Ladoo for boy and Jalebi for girl; these families often go on to abort female fetuses.

=== Religion ===
Religion in Jhajjar district (2011)
Religion	Percent
Hinduism	98.67%
Islam	0.86%
Other or not stated	0.47%

Religion in Jhajjar District (Note: 1941 figures are for Jhajjar Tehsil, which roughly matches present-day district borders. District was incorporated to take into account population increases during the post-independence era, which has resulted in various bifurcations of districts and tehsils across the historic Punjab Province region.)
Religion	Population (1941)	Percentage (1941)
Hinduism (Note: 1941 census: Including Ad-Dharmis)	230,090	88.63%
Islam	29,132	11.22%
Sikhism	176	0.07%
Christianity	48	0.02%
Others (Note: Including Jainism, Buddhism, Zoroastrianism, Judaism, or not stated)	174	0.07%
Total Population	259,620	100%

=== Languages ===
Languages of Jhajjar district (2011)
1. Haryanvi (73.9%)
2. Hindi (24.0%)
3. Others (2.12%)

At the time of the 2011 Census of India, 73.88% of the population in the district spoke Haryanvi and 24.00% Hindi as their first language.

== Divisions ==
Jhajjar district is divided into 4 sub-divisions: Jhajjar, Bahadurgarh, Badli and Beri. Jhajjar sub-division comprises two tehsils: Jhajjar and Matanhail. Bahadurgarh sub-division comprises only one tehsil, Bahadurgarh. Badli and Beri sub-division also comprises only one tehsil each.

There are four Haryana Vidhan Sabha constituencies in this district: Bahadurgarh, Badli, Jhajjar and Beri. All of these are part of Rohtak Lok Sabha constituency.

=== Villages ===
Tehsil Wise List of Revenue Estate Villages

#	BADLI	BAHADURGARH	BERI	JHAJJAR	MATANHAIL	SALHAWAS
1	Aurangpur	Agarpur	Achhej	Ahri	Akheri Madanpur	Amboli
2	Badli	Asanda	Baghpur	Amadalpur	Amadalshahpur	Bhurawas
3	Badsa	Asoudha Siwan	Bakra	Asadpur Khera	Bahu	Birar
4	Bahmanola	Asoudha Todran	Barhana	Babepur	Bajidpur Tappa Birohar	Bithla
5	Bir Dadri	Bahadurgarh	Beri dopana	Babra	Bambulia	Dhana
6	Bupania	Balour	Beri khas	Baktawarpur alias Raiya	Bhindawas	Dhania
7	Dadri Toe	Bamnauli	Bhambewa	Bazidpur Tappa Haveli	Bilochpura	Dhanirwas
8	Daryapur	Barahi	Bhutiyan	Bhadana	Bir Chhuchhakwas	Hamayupur
9	Desalpur	Barktabad	Bishan	Bhadani	Birohar	Jamalpur
10	Dewarkhana	Bhaproda	Chamanpura	Bhatehra	Chadwana	Jhansuwa
11	Fatehpur	Chhara	Chhochhi	Bhikanpur Viran	Dhalanwas	Kohandrawali
12	Fazabad alias Passour	Chhudani	Chimni	Bir Sunarwala	Goria	Ladain
13	Gangarwah	Daboda Kalan	Dhandhlan	Birdhana	Ishlamgarh	Mundahera
14	Goyla Kalan	Daboda Khurd	Dharana	Boria	Jhamri	Nilaheri
15	Gubhana	Dahkora	Dhour	Chandol	Jharli	Niwada
16	Habibpur Viran	Dulehra	Dighal	Chandpur	Kaliawas	Sahlawas
17	Ismailpur	Hassanpur	Diwana	Chandpuri Viran	Khachroli	
18	Jahangirpur	Isharheri	Dubaldhad ghikan	Chhapar	Khanpur Kalan	
19	Khalikpur	Jakhoda	Dubaldhan bhidhan	Dadanpur	Khanpur Khurd	
20	Kheri Jat	Jasour Kheri	Dubaldhan kirman	Dawala	Khaparwas	
21	Kherka Gujjar	Kanonda	Dujana	Dhakla	Khera Thru	
22	Khungai	Kasar	Gangtan	Dharouli	Khetawas	
23	Kutani	Khairpur	Gochhi	Dulina	Khorda	
24	Ladpur	Kharhar	Godhri	Fatehpuri	Koelpuri	
25	Lagarpur	Kharman	Jahazgarh	Fortpura	Maliawas	
26	Lohat	Kheri Jasour	Lakria	Gijarod	Manakawas	
27	Luksar	KHERKA MUSALMAN	Madana kalan	Girawar	Marot	
28	Mahmudpur Majra	Kulasi	Madana khurd	Girdharpur	Matanhail	
29	Majri	Ladrawan	Majra D	Gudha	Mohanbari	
30	Munda Khera	Loharheri	Malikpur	Gwalison	Mundsa	
31	Munimpur Kakrola	Lowa Kalan	Mangawas	Hassanpur	Nauganwa	
32	Nangla	Lowa khurd	Birhar Majra	Isharhera	Redhuwas	
33	Nimana	Majra asanda	Paharipur	Jaitpur	Ruriawas	
34	Pelpa	Mandothi	Palra	Jatwara	Sasroli	
35	Shahpur	Mattan	Seria	Jaundhi	Sehlanga	
36	Sheojipura	Mehandipur	Shaphipur	Jhajjar	Shahjahpur	
37	Sondhi	Mukandpur	Siwana	Kablana	Sundreti	
38	Yakubpur	Nilothi	Wazirpur	Kahri		
39	Zardakpur	Nuna majra		Kaloi		
40		Parnala		Kamalgarh		
41		Rewari Khera		Kanwah		
42		Rohad		Karodha		
43		Sankhol		Kasni		
44		Sarai Aurangabad		Khakhana		
45		Shadpur		Khatiwas		
46		Shidipur		Kheri asra		
47		Silothi		Kheri Hoshdarpur		
48		Soldha		Kheri Khummar		
49		Tandaheri		Kheri Taluka Patouda		
50				Khudan		
51				Kilroud		
52				Koka		
53				Kulana		
54				Kunjia		
55				Luhari		
56				Machhroli		
57				Mahrana		
58				Mubarikpur		
59				Nangli Viran		
60				Neola		
61				Patasani		
62				Putauda		
63				Raipur		
64				Rankhanda		
65				Sabili		
66				Sarola		
67				Shamaspur majra		
68				Shekhupur jat		
69				Sikanderpur		
70				Silana		
71				Silani pana kesho		
72				Silani pana zalim		
73				Subana		
74				Suloudha		
75				Surah		
76				Surakhpur Viran		
77				Surehti		
78				Surkhpur tappa havali		
79				Talao		
80				Tamaspura		
81				Tatarpur		
82				Tumbaheri		
83				Ukhalchana		
84				Untlodha		
85				Zahadpur		

== Industries ==
Bahadurgarh, known as 'The City of Destiny', is the major industrial estate of the district. Bahadurgarh alone covers 3,000 industries out of 3,300 total industries in district. Basic industries are ceramics, glass, chemicals, engineering, electrical and electronics.

=== SSI & MSI units ===
In Jhajjar District, there are 1818 SSI (Small Scale Industries) units registered as of 31 December 2000. The total approximate investment of these units is 9550.01 lakhs and total employment in these units is 12153. In 2016, there are 3050 SSI or MSI in Jhajjar district, out of which Bahadurgarh alone have 2800 MSI (Medium Size Industries).

=== LSI units ===
There are over 250 LSI in the District in 2016 which are engaged in the manufacturing. Out of the 250 LSI (Large Scale Industries), 200 are in Bahadurgarh.

== Notable people ==
- B.D. Sharma, First CM of Haryana
- Kaptan Birdhana (born 1970), politician - Chairman of Jhajjar Zila Parishad, BJP MLA (Candidate) 2024 & former District General Secretary of Bhartiya Janta Party
- Manjul Bhardwaj (born 1969), actor, director, writer and facilitator
- Manu Bhaker (born 2002), professional shooter
- Sumit Nagal (born 1997), professional tennis player
- Sunil Dabas, Dronacharya Awardee, Padma Shri Awardee

== See also ==
- Bahadurgarh
- Rohtak
- Beri
- Gurgaon
- Babepur
