= History of Haryana =

Haryana is a state in India. The state houses several sites from the Indus Valley Civilization, which was a cradle of civilisation.

Haryana has been ruled by various native and non-native polities including the Maurya Empire, Gupta Empire, Pushyabhuti dynasty, Pratihara dynasty, Tomara Dynasty, Chahamanas of Shakambhari, Ghurid dynasty, Delhi Sultanate, Mughal Empire, Sikh Confederacy, Durrani Empire, Maratha Empire, George Thomas, Gwalior State, Company Rule in India and British Raj.

Sikhs during the 18th and 19th centuries ruled some parts of the Haryana region which earlier came under Punjab division. Some Sikh states in Haryana were Jind, Kaithal, Hisar, Ladwa, Kalsia and others. Mostly Sikh rulers belong to Jats community of Punjab.

During Delhi Sultanate and Mughal Empire, Haryana was known as Delhi Subah. Many historically significant battles have been fought in it such as Battle of Tarain, Battle of Panipat, and Battle of Karnal. The Khanzadas of Mewat ruled the Mewat region until 1527.

During the British Colonial period, from 1858 to 1947 it was administered as a part of the Punjab province. It became a separate administrative state of India in 1966. Chandigarh is the joint capital for the states of Punjab and Haryana.

== Chronological history ==
=== Paleolithic ===
History of human presence in Haryana dates back to 100,000 years ago. Archaeologists discovered cave paintings and tools in Mangar Bani hill forest in May 2021; the cave paintings are estimated to be 100,000 years old. These are believed to be the largest in the Indian subcontinent and possibly the world's oldest. Group of 43 sites was found in this area including Ankhir, Anangpur, Anangpur Dam, Shilakhari, Mangar Bani, Dhauj, Kot, Roj ka Gujjar, Nurpur, Dhumaspur, Surajkund, etc.

Paleolithic and Neolithic Stone Age (7000 BCE - 5500 BCE) find were excavated from the banks of the stream (paleochannel of Saraswati river) flowing through HMT complex, by the Guy Ellcock Pilgrim who was a British geologist and palaeontologist, who discovered 150,000 year old prehistoric human teeth and part of a jaw denoting that the ancient people, who were intelligent hominins dating as far back as 150,000 ybp Acheulean period, lived in Pinjore region near Chandigarh. Quartzite tools of Lower Paleolithic period were excavated in this region extending from Pinjore in Haryana to Nalagarh (Solan district in Himachal Pradesh.

=== Neolithic ===
Neolithic are numerous in Haryana, specially the pre-IVC phases found at Bhirrana, Siswal, Rakhigarhi, Kunal, etc.

=== Indus Valley Civilisation ===
Indus Valley civilisation evolved on the banks of Rigvedic rivers Indus and Sarasvati rivers. Sarasvati and its tributary Drishadvati river (Ghaggar) flow through north and central Haryana and there are numerous IVC sites in haryana along paleochannels of these rivers, notable among those are the Rakhi Garhi, Banawali, Bhirrana, Farmana, Jognakhera, Mitathal, Siswal, and IVC mines and smelter at Tosham. Rakhigarhi Indus Valley Civilisation Museum has been constructed for the conservation of the artefacts.

There were Janapadas in Haryana from 1500 BCE till the 6th century BCE, which evolved into Mahajanapadas which lasted from 6th century BCE to 4th century BCE. During Janpada period Kuru Janapada covered most of Haryana. South Haryana where Matsya Janapada (700–300 BCE) covered Mewat in Haryana (and Alwar in Rajasthan) and Surasena Janapada covered Braj region including parts of Haryana near Barsana (such as Punhana). The Kuru Janapada evolved into a Mahajanapada which sovereignty over other surrounding Janpadas. The sandy Bagar tract in north-western and west-central Haryana on the Haryana-Rajasthan border was part of the larger Jangladesh which also covered thr Thar area of Rajasthan. Lord Krishna revealed Bhagavad Gita to Arjuna at Jyotisar. Śrauta were codified in Haryana during Kuru Mahajanpada era.

In some ancient Hindu texts, the boundaries of Kurukshetra (the area under Kuru Janapada, not just the modern day Kurukshetra city) correspond roughly to the state of Haryana. Thus according to the Taittiriya Aranyaka 5.1.1., the Kurukshetra region is south of Turghna (Srughna/Sugh), north of Khandavprastha forest (Delhi and Mewat region), east of Maru Pradesh (Marusthal or desert) and west of Parin. Some of these historic places are included in the 48 Kos Parikrama of Kurukshetra.

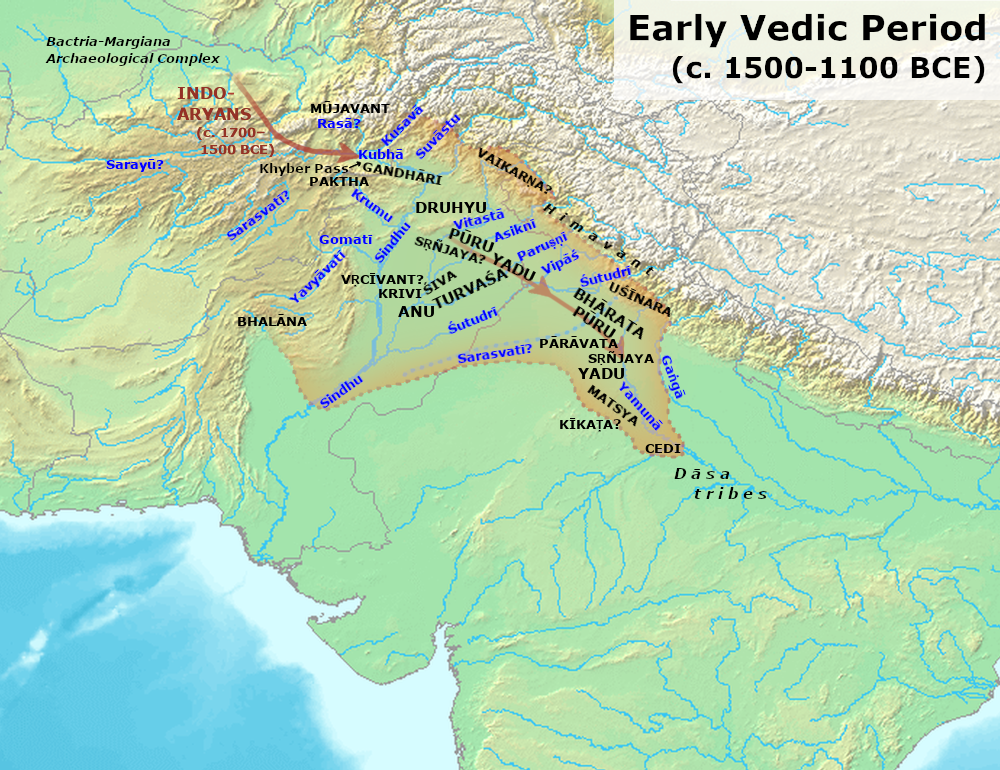
Early Vedic Culture (1700-1100 BCE), era of janpadas.

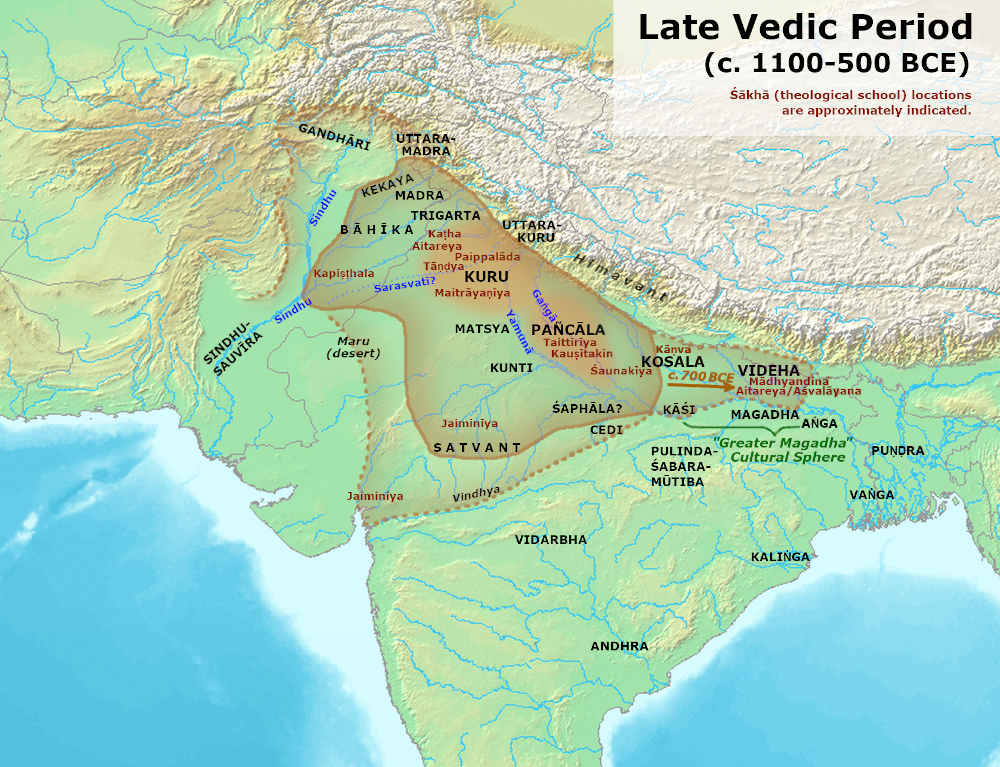
Late Vedic Culture (1100-500 BCE), janpadas evolved into mahajanpadas.

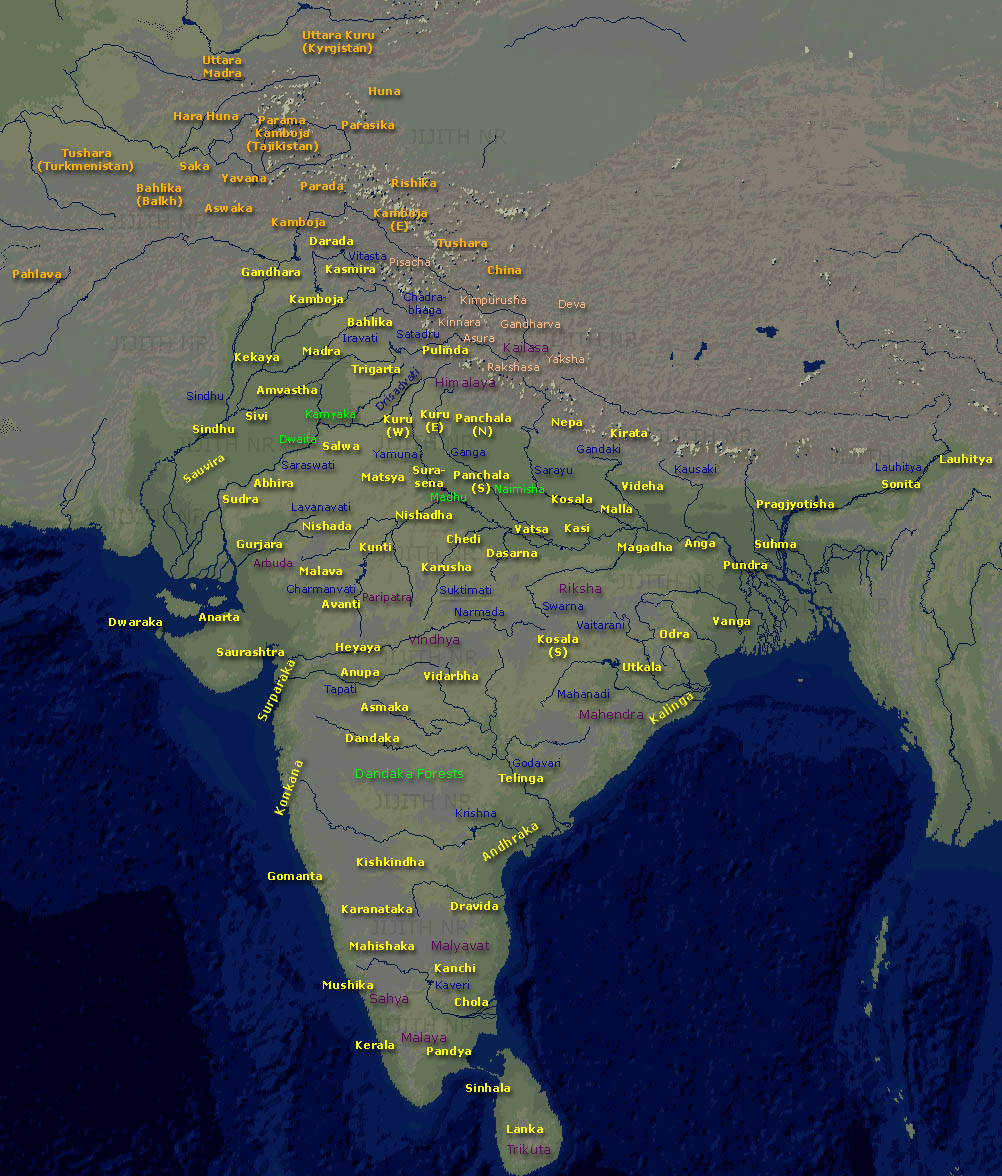
Locations of kingdoms and republics in Bharata Khanda (India) mentioned in epics like mahabharta.

=== Sultanate period ===
Muhammad Ghori conquered Haryana after the Second Battle of Tarain. Following his death, the Delhi Sultanate was established that ruled much of India for several centuries. The earliest reference to 'Hariana' occurs in a Sanskrit inscription dated 1328 AD kept in Delhi Museum, which refers to this region as The heaven on earth, indicating that it was fertile and relatively peaceful at that time. Firuz Shah Tughlaq established a fort at Hisar in 1354 to further fortify the region, and also constructed canals or rajwahas as they were referred to in the Indo-Persian historical texts.

The Khanzadas of Mewat were a ruling dynasty of Muslim Rajputs, who traced their lineage to Raja Sonpar Pal, a Yaduvanshi Rajput who converted to Islam during the Delhi Sultanate. The Khanzadas were granted the Lordship of Mewat by Firuz Shah Tughlaq in 1372. Raja Nahar Khan, formerly known as Raja Sonpar Pal, proclaimed the title of Wali-e-Mewat, solidifying a hereditary polity that endured until 1527.

=== Mughal Empire ===
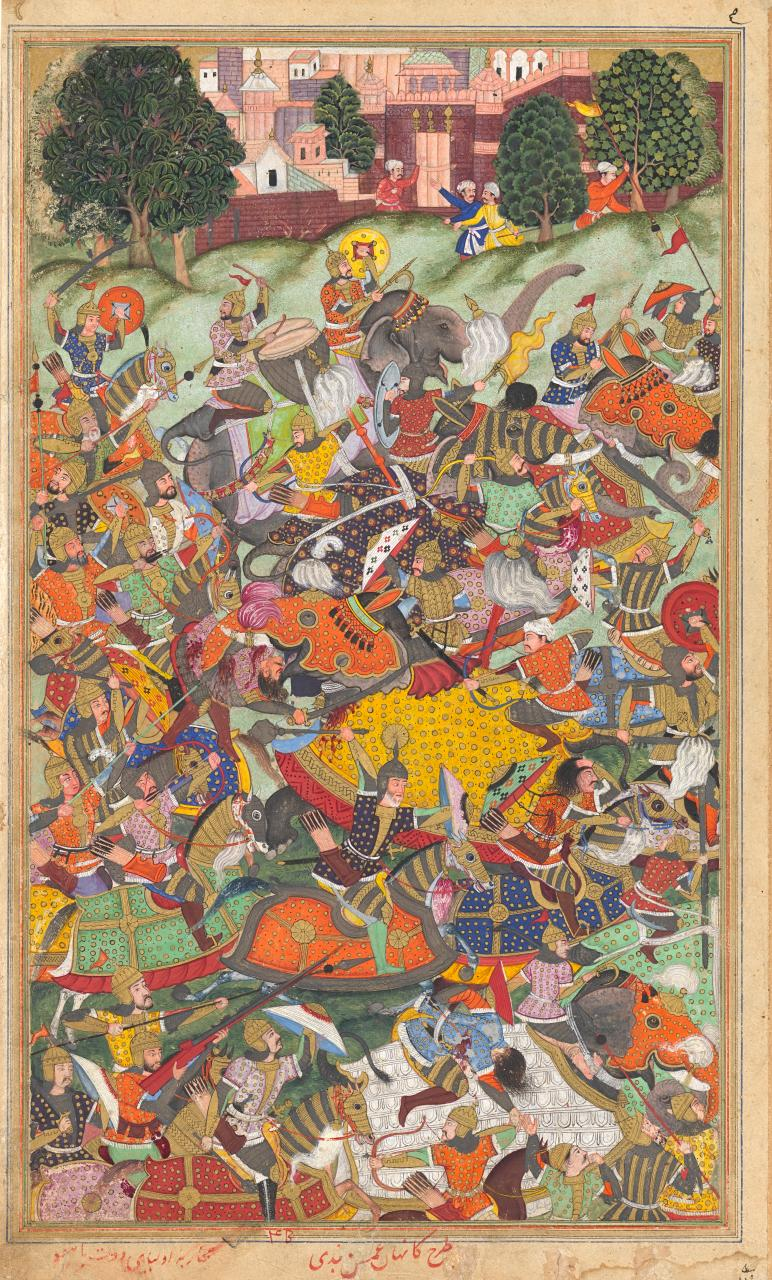
The defeat of Hemu at the Second Battle of Panipat, c. 1556, Akbarnama.

The three famous battles of Panipat took place near the modern town of Panipat. The first battle took place in 1526, where Babur, the ruler of Kabul defeated Ibrahim Lodi of the Delhi Sultanate, through the use of field artillery. This battle marked the beginning of the Mughal Empire in India. Hasan Khan Mewati was the son of Raja Alawal Khan, his dynasty ruled Mewat for nearly two centuries. Descended from Raja Nahar Khan, the Wali of Mewat in the 14th century, Hasan Khan Mewati assumed the role of a sovereign king. Babur acknowledged him as the leader of the 'Mewat country'.

In the First Battle of Panipat, Hasan Khan Mewati supported Ibrahim Lodi against Babur in 1526, marked a pivotal moment in the conflict between the Mughal Empire and the Delhi Sultanate. Hasan Khan Mewati later aligned himself with Rana Sanga in continued opposition against the Mughal Empire in the Battle of Khanwa, where he was killed by the forces led by Babur.

In the Second Battle of Panipat (5 November 1556), Akbar's general Bairam Khan defeated Hemu, the local Haryanvi who grew up in Rewari. Hemu, who belonged to Rewari in Haryana, rose from a businessman to become adviser to Afghan kings and then Prime Minister-cum-Chief of Army. He fought and won 22 battles in between 1553 and 1556, from Punjab to Bengal against Afghans and Mughals and won all of them without losing any. Hemu defeated Akbar's army at Tughlaqabad in Battle of Delhi-1556 and became king at Delhi on 7 October 1556 declaring himself as Vikramaditya following the reigns of earlier Vedic kings. Hemu died in the Second Battle of Panipat.

=== Maratha period (1756–1801) ===
The Third Battle of Panipat was fought in 1761 between the Afghan Emperor Ahmad Shah Abdali and the Maratha Empire under Sadashivrao Bhau of Pune. Ahmad Shah won decisively, on 13 January 1761.

=== Colonial period ===
==== 1857 war of independence ====
The Indian Rebellion of 1857 war started first at Ambala Cantonment, 8 hours before revolt started in Meerut, when the soldiers of 5th Indian Infantry Brigade and 60th Indian Infantry Brigade revolted but it was crushed. 5th and 60th Regiments of Benga Native Infantry rebelled at Umballa (Ambala). During the Battle of Narnaul at Nasibpur on 16 November 1857 led by Rao Tula Ram led 5000 force including Rewari forces 3000 Ahirs in which British lost 70 British soldiers and their commanders colonel Gerrard and Captain Wallace. 40 British soldiers and officers Captain Craige, Captain Kennedy and Captain Pearse were wounded. The major centers of rebellion were at Hisar, Hansi, Sirsa, Rohtak, Jhajjar, Bahadurgarh, Farrukhnagar, Ballabhgarh, Rewari, Ambala, Panipat and Thanesar. Under the "Delhi Agency" there were seven Princely states, Jhajjar, Farrukhnagar, Ballabhgarh, Loharu, Pataudi and Dujana. The Chiefs of the last two estates remained loyal to the British and others rebelled. The Rajput rulers of Rajasthan also kept out of the mutiny.

Raja Nahar Singh was the ruler of Ballabhgarh, Rao Tula Ram ruler of Rewari and his cousin Gopal Dev, Nawab Abdur Rahman Khan Jhajjar, Nawab Ahmad Ali of Farrukhnagar, Sadruddin was the leader of Mewat, Harsukh Rai and Mirza Gauhar Ali of Palwal and Imam of Bu Ali Shah Qalandar mosque in Panipat played key role.

After the failure of revolt by Indians, Haryana was taken out of North-Western Provinces and merged with Punjab as a punishment.

This rebellion was partly caused by the unjust tax system implemented through the use of The Great Hedge of India, a historic inland customs border which ran through several states including Haryana.

==== Independence and riots ====
Lala Lajpat Rai worked towards the social reform, spread of Arya Samaj, creation of mass support for the Indian independence movement and he died protesting against the Simon Commission. Lala Murlidhar of Ambala and journalist Balmukund Gupt of Rewari were the members of the founding session of congress who promoted Swadeshi movement. Chhotu Ram, Pandit Nekiram Sharma, Lala Ugrasen and Ramswaroop Jaglan of Bidhwan were also key independence activists.

In 1907, two years after the 1905 Partition of Bengal, British Indian Army soldiers in the 6th Jat Light Infantry and 10th Jats mutinied and sided with Bengali revolutionaries to take over a government treasury. Their revolt was suppressed by the colonial government and several mutineers were sentenced to prison. In early 1919, Jhanda Singh Giani was especially noted for his protests against the Rowlatt Act, he was a pleader and resident of Ambala. In 1914, Kasi Ram Joshi a member of the Ghadar Party hailing from Haryana, returned to India from America. On 15 March 1915 he was hanged by the colonial rulers. Subhas Chandra Bose's Azad Hind Fauj had 2847 soldiers from Haryana, of whom 346 attained martyrdom.

During the partition of India in 1947, state experienced riots at many places, which also scores of death and migration of millions of people from Haryana to Pakistan and vice versa.

=== Formation of Haryana ===
==== Hindi language movement ====
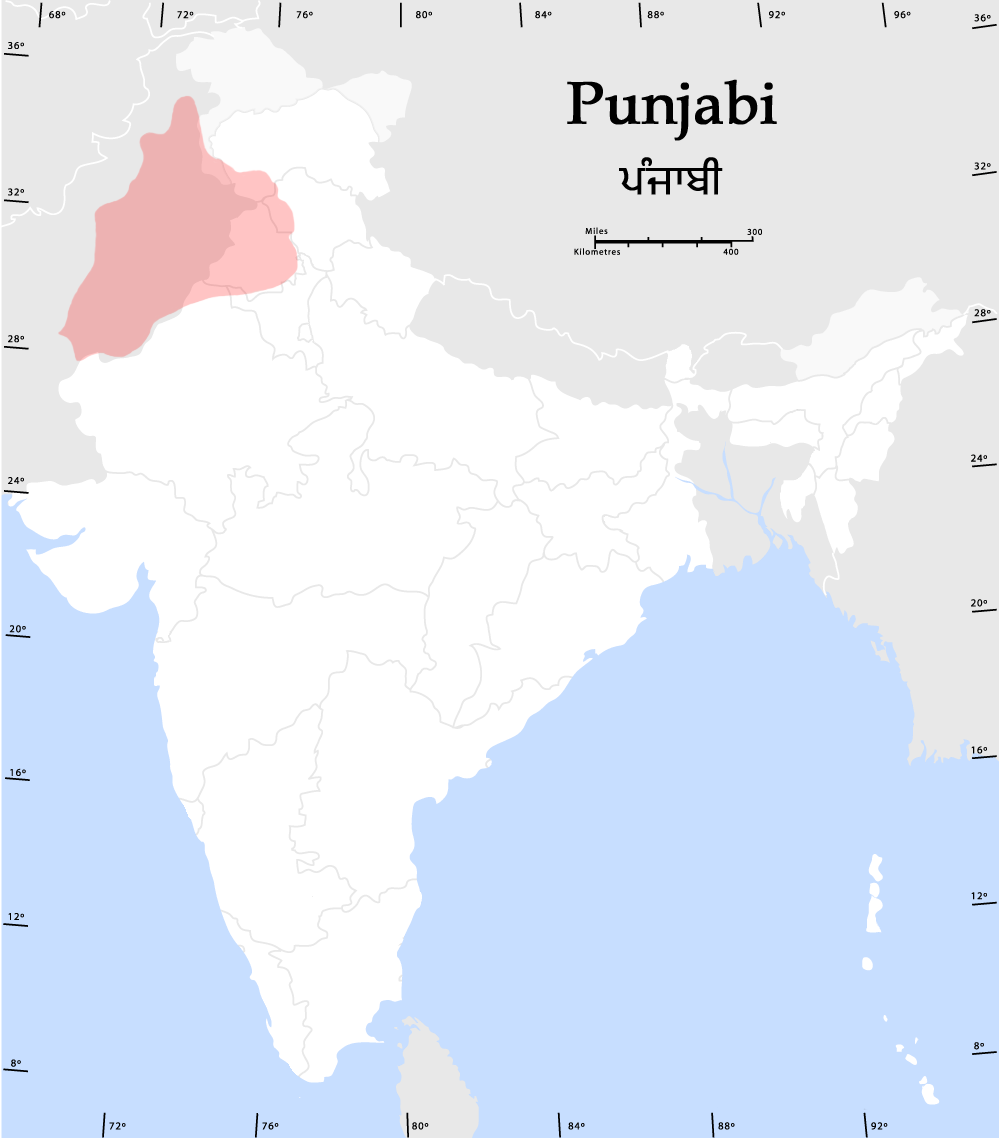
A map of the distribution of native Punjabi speakers in India and Pakistan

Punjabi Suba movement started in Punjab started in 1947 and lasted till 1966. During this time a Hindi language movement also started in Punjab for a short period that started on 30 April 1957 and lasted till 27 December 1957 in Hindi-speaking areas of Punjab. Movement started after government of post-independence Punjab tried to promote Punjabi as state language but many groups in modern Haryana considered Punjabi as a threat. After this movement was successful in getting the ball rolling for a Hindi-speaking state. Another movement for leftover Punjabi-speaking parts started, this Punjabi suba & Punjabi language movement demanded under which Punjabi and gurmukhi to be made official in after division. After reorganisation, Haryana government banned Punjabi in the state.

In 2018, the Government of Haryana started to award ₹10,000 per month pension to the Matribhasa Satyagrahis (Hindi language activists).

==== Re-organisation of the Punjab state ====
On 1 November 1966, Haryana was carved out of the East Punjab on linguistic grounds, with majorly consisting of the "Hindi Speaking areas". Same example was later followed in creation of Himachal Pradesh as well.

In order to analyse and find a cooperative as well as universally acceptable solution, for the long going vexed linguistic problem, being faced by Punjab, the parliament announced the formation of the Parliamentary Committee on Demand for Punjabi Suba (1966) chairmanned by Sardar Hukam Singh, on 23 September 1965. According to the 90 paged report, the committee initially came to an understanding that a 'co-operative solution' was not possible. Moreover, it stated that unanimity is also not possible or necessary on any matters in a democratic set-up. So, after perusing the large number of memoranda/representations received by the committee and hearing the various view-points expressed by the different witnesses representing the various shades of opinion, the committee suggested the re-organisation of the State of Punjab on linguistic basis. It also stated that the then Chief Minister of the Punjab State admitted that the situation needed a change and status quo in its entirety was not possible." Although a section of the people from the Punjab canvassed before the committee that the status quo might be maintained in the Punjab. Even a third argument advanced in favour of the status quo was that, any reorganisation of the State would not be in the interests of the security of the country and would weaken the defence of India, which was later struck off due to lack of authentic data or justifiable reasons.

On 23 April 1966, while acting on the report submitted by the parliamentary committee, the Indian government set up the Punjab Boundary Commission under the chairmanship of Justice J. C. Shah & two members S.Dutt & M. M. Philip to divide and set up the boundaries of Punjab and Haryana. The commission gave its report on 31 May 1966. According to this report the then districts of Hissar, Mahendragarh, Gurgaon, Rohtak, and Karnal were to be a part of the new state of Haryana. Further the Tehsils of Jind (district Sangrur), Narwana (district Sangrur) Naraingarh, Ambala, Jagadhari tahsil of district Ambala were also included. The commission recommended that whole Tehsil Kharar (including Chandigarh) should also be a part of Haryana.

However, commission one member from three, Subimal Dutt submitted a dissenting note, arguing that Kharar tehsil minus Kalka Police Station (He recommended for Himachal) area but including Chandigarh should merge with Punjabi state, citing its Punjabi-speaking rural majority, the migratory nature of the Hindi-speaking urban population, and its earlier classification under the Punjabi region as per the Sachar Formula of 1949.

The Territorial changes as a result of the Reorganisation 1966

1. Entire districts of Hisar, Rohtak, Gurgaon, Karnal and Mahendragarh, complete tahsils of Ambala, Jagadhri, Naraingarh and 153 villages along with Kalka town of Kharar tahsil of Ambala district and two tahsils viz., Jind and Narwana of Sangrur District (44,222.0 kmsq.) were transferred for formation of the newly created State of Haryana on 1 November 1966.
2. 36 villages, Manimajra and Chandigarh towns of Kharar tahsil of Ambala district (114.0 kmsq.) were lumped together to come out a separate administrative unit stuled as Union Territory of Chandigarh.
3. 282 villages along with Kharar and Kurali towns Kharar tahsil of composite Ambala district in Punjab.

Initially, 153 villages and Kalka town were added to Naraingarh Tahsil. Later, these areas were separated from Naraingarh Tahsil to form a new administrative unit—Kalka Tahsil—under the Haryana Government Notification No. 4575-E(V)-67/2626, dated the 25th July, 1967.

Uttawar forced sterilisations, occurred when on November 6, 1976, when mass vasectomy of nearly 800 men of Uttawar village was done, in Palwal district, Haryana during India’s Emergency imposed by Indira Gandhi.

== Thematic history of Haryana ==
=== Modern administration ===
==== Districts ====
- 1 Nov 1966: Haryana carved out as new state from Punjab with 7 districts: Ambala, Jind, Hisar, Mahendragarh, Gurgaon (Gurugram), Karnal, and Rohtak.
- 1972: 2 new districts carved out, namely Bhiwani from Hisar district and Sonipat from Rohtak district.
- 1973: Kurukshetra carved out from Karnal district.
- 1975: Sirsa district carved out of Hisar district.
- 1979: Faridabad district carved out of Gurgaon district.
- 1989: 4 new districts carved out, namely Yamunanagar from Ambala district, Kaithal (Karnal district and Kurukshetra districts), Rewari from Gurgaon district, Panipat from Karnal district.
- 1995: Panchkula carved out of Ambala district.
- 1996: Fatehabad carved out of Hisar district.
- 1997: Jhajjar carved out of Rohtak district.
- 2005: Nuh carved out of Gurgaon district.
- 2008: Palwal carved out of Faridabad district.
- 2016: Charkhi Dadri carved out of Bhiwani district.

=== Agrimarketing in India ===
'India International Horticulture Market (IIHM's), asia's largest on 537 acre with 1200 shops & 17 massive specialised marketing sheds, is set up in Ganaur on NH44 in Sonipat district of Haryana with ₹2700 crore initial assessment in construction. It entails mechanism for cleaning, branding, sorting, packing & processing units, storing, and e-auction of the goods. There will be warehouses, cold storages, hostel, residential colony for the officials, large parking and automobile workshop, 4 electricity stations, and a sewage statement plant, etc.are in India

==== Farming ====
Rakhigarhi granary

==== Irrigation ====
Haryana has network of canals across of state divided into 8 canal command areas. Haryana has 47% share (reduced from 70% after an agreement with Delhi in 1994) in Yamuna river water and ?% share in Sutlej river water too for which disputed Sutlej Yamuna link canal is still partially completed for several decades.

Indus treaty covers a total of 168 million acre-feet (207 km^{3}) of water, of which India can utilise 33 million acre-feet (20% of total) from the three rivers assigned to India. In 2019, India utilises only 93–94% (30 million acre-feet) of its share, and 6–7% (2 million acre-feet, 2.5 km^{3} of India's unitised share flows to Pakistan, resulting in a total of 87% water flowing to Pakistan. India is building three dams to utilise 100% of its 33 million acre-feet share (20% of total water under treaty). India is undertaking 3 projects to ensure India utilises its full share of Indus Waters Treaty, (a) Shahpurkandi dam project on Ravi River in Pathankot district of Punjab (b) Sutlej-Beas link in Punjab (see also Pandoh Dam) and the Ujh Dam project on Ujh River (a tributary of Ravi river) in Jammu and Kashmir.

Renukaji dam, is INR4,596.76 crore 148m high rockfill gravity dam project being built on the Giri river in Sirmour district with live storage of 0.404 MAF on 1,508 hectares to supply 23 cusec water and generate 40MW peak flow power. An agreement for its construction and sharing of cost and benefits (water and electricity) was signed by the Union Minister for Water and Chief Ministers of six states, namely Haryana (47.8% share of water), UP and Uttakhand (33.65% joint share) Rajasthan (9.3%), Delhi (6.04%) and Himachal Pradesh (3.15), on 11 January 2019. It has been declared a national project, resulting in 90% funding from the centre govt and the rest from the stakeholder states. Giri River (cord: 30.44549 °N and 77.67358 ° Ö) in the state of Uttrakhand and Himachal is a tributary of Yamuna, which in turn is a tributary of Ganges.

(a) Lakhwar Dam on Yamuna in Uttrakhand, (b) Renukaji Dam on Giri river in Himchal and (c) Kishau Dam on Tons River in Uttrakhand. The agreements among the stakeholder states and centre govt has been signed for the Kishwar Dam (August 2018 and Renukaji Dam (January 2019) and the agreement for the remaining Kishau Dam is likely to be signed soon. The funding for the Kishwar Dam has already been approved for the centre govt's cabinet and the funding for the Renukaji Dam is expected to be approved soon.

Renukaji dam, is INR4,596.76 crore 148m high rockfileld gravity dam project being built on the Giri river in Sirmour district with live storage of 0.404 MAF on 1,508 hectares to supply 23 cusec water and generate 40MW peak flow power. An agreement for its construction and sharing of cost and benefits (water and electricity) was signed by the Union Minister for Water and Chief Ministers of six states, namely Haryana (47.8% share of water), UP and Uttakhand (33.65% joint share) Rajasthan (9.3%), Delhi (6.04%) and Himachal Pradesh (3.15), on 11 January 2019. It has been declared a national project, resulting in 90% funding from the centre govt and the rest from the stakeholder states. Giri River (cord: 30.44549 °N and 77.67358 ° Ö) in the state of Uttrakhand and Himachal is a tributary of Yamuna, which in turn is a tributary of the Ganges.

Haryana has 1356 canal tailends of which 250 had not seen the water for up to 39 years. Between 2016 and 2018, govt rejuvenated all but 10 worst tailends. Specially the canals in Narnaul, Loharu and Rewari area were rehabilitated and water started to reach the tailend of canals after a gap of 39 years.

- Johad wetlands and Haryana State Waterbody Management Board. In 2018, govt began rejuvenating 500 of these ponds in the initial phase, 390 injection well were built to pump rainwater into the ground to recharge the groundwater.
- Saraswati
  - Adi Badri
  - Ghaggar-Hakra River
- Sutlej
  - Bhakhra Dam
    - Indira Gandhi Canal
  - Sutlej Yamuna link canal
- Yamuna, Haryana has 47.8% share in Yamuna water to be distributed for irrigation.
  - Western Yamuna Canal
  - Lakhwar Dam: Haryana share is 177 cusec, construction on this national project started in 2018
  - Kishau Dam: Haryana share is 709 cusec in this under construction national project.
  - Renukaji Dam: Haryana share is 266 cusec in this under construction national project.
  - Tajewala Barrage (1873)
  - South haryana
    - Masani barrage
    - Sahibi River including Najafgarh drain
      - Krishnavati river (drain 8)
      - Dohan river
    - Nuh System of Lakes (also called Kotla lake) with bund built by British Raj.Haryana commenced an INR82 crore project in 2018 to restore these lakes.

=== Commerce and trade ===
==== Industries ====
- Metal smelter and manufacturing at Tosham from Indus Valley civilisation.
- Rakhigarhi silver bronze smelters and manufacturing
- Great Hedge of India for tariffs during British Raj

==== Mining ====
Mines at Tosham Hill range from Indus Valley civilisation.

=== Culture ===
==== Clothing ====
===== Jewelry and ornaments =====
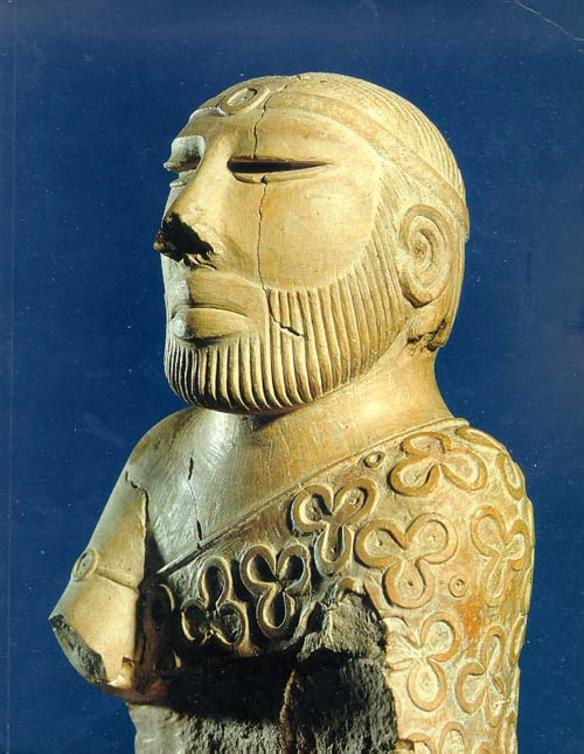
Attire and ornament of Priest-King from Indus Valley civilisation.

Rakhigarhi silver bronze ornaments finds and Dancing Girl ornaments.

===== Textiles =====
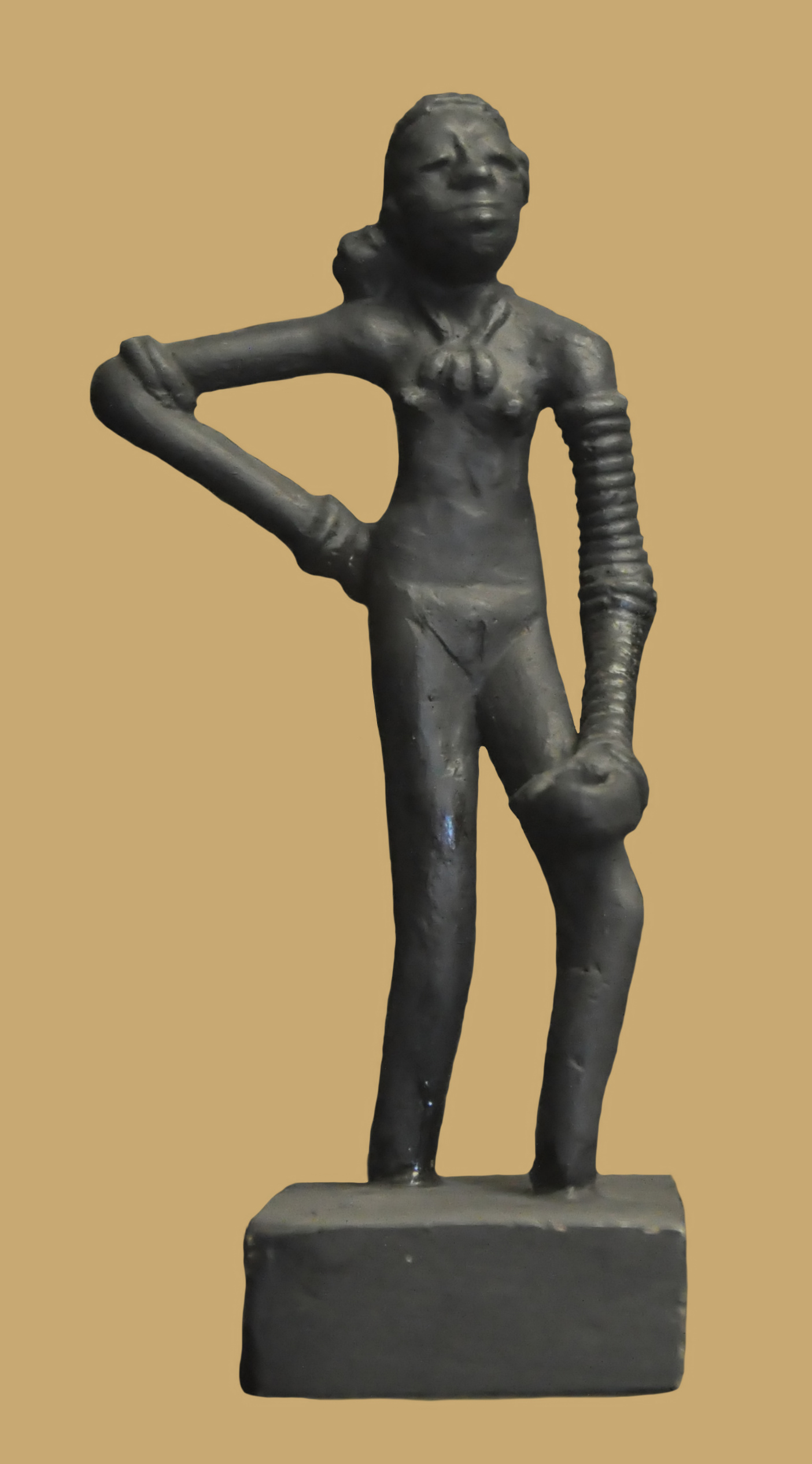
Dancing girl attire and ornaments from Indus Valley civilisation.

Dancing Girl attire.

=== Infrastructure ===
==== Architecture ====
- IVC Black and red ware culture (1450BCE-1200BCE)
- Vedic Era Painted Grey Ware culture (1200BCE to 600BCE)
- Pre-Islamic architecture of Haryana
  - Bhima Devi Temple Site Museum
  - Kalayat Ancient Bricks Temple Complex
  - Adi Badri, Haryana
  - Morni Hills Shiva temple
  - Pillars of Ashoka in Haryana.
    - Topra Kalan pillar relocated as Delhi-Topra pillar at Feroz Shah Kotla
    - Agroha Mound pillar relocated to Lat Mosque Hisar (bottom half)) and Fatehabad mosque (top half)

Nangal Sirohi in Mahendragarh district, 130 km from Delhi, is popular for its havelis of shekhavati architecture within NCR.

==== Education ====
Chanetic Buddhist monastic university as chronicled by Hieun Tsang.

==== Military ====
Military establishments in Haryana:
Indian Military stations n Haryana include the Indian National Defence University - India's only military university, National Security Guard (NSG) HQ in Gurugram, 4 major Air Force Stations (at Ambala, Faridabad, Gurugram and Sirsa), 3 major Army Bases (at Western Command Chandimandir HQ in Panchkula, 2nd Corp HQ at Ambala and 32 Div HQ at Hisar), Central Reserve Police Force (CRPF) base in Gurugram, 3 Sainik Schools (Kunjpura - officially first sainik school in India, Rewari, and Matanhail.

- Indian Airforce stations
  - Ambala Air Force Base
  - Gurugram Air Force Station
  - Sirsa Air Force Station
  - Raja Nahar Singh Faridabad Air Force Logistics Station
  - see also List of Indian Air Force bases
- Indian Army stations
  - Hisar Military Station
  - see also List of Cantonments in India
- Indian Navy stations
  - INS Aravali, 2025, Gurugram
  - Information Management and Analysis Centre (IMAC), 2014, Gurugram
  - Information Fusion Centre – Indian Ocean region (IFC-IOR), 2018, Gurugram
  - see also List of Indian Navy bases

Military contribution of Haryana: Haryana, with 2% total population of India, contributes 11% soldiers of Indian Military. 10% (2,000,000) of Haryana's population belongs to the immediate family of soldiers, with 200,000 serving & 400,000 retired soldiers and their 1,400,000 dependent spouse and children.

Indian Air Force: Haryana (with 2% share in India's population) has the second highest number of air force officers (after Uttar Pradesh which has 11 times more population than Haryana) and the third highest number of airmen.

Indian Military Academy (IMA) officers: Haryana contributes second or third highest number of military officers and it contributes 4 to 5 times more military officers than its share of India's population. In 2023, of the 373 newly graduated officer cadets, UP (63) and Bihar (33), which had more officers than Haryana (32), had the percentage of officers similar to their population share in India whereas Haryana had 4.3 times more officers then its share in India's population. Of these officers, 16.9% (63) were from Uttar Pradesh (with 16.5% population of India), 8.8% (33 officers) were from Bihar (8.6% population of India), 8.6% (32 officers) were from Haryana (2% population of India), 6.7% (25 officers) were Uttrakhand (0.84% population of India), 6.2% (23 officers) were from Punjab (2.3% population of India).

Indian Army non-officer soldiers of lower rank: In 2021, of the 1,151,726 serving non-officer soldiers, Haryana, Punjab, JK and Himachal had a much higher percentage of soldiers than their population share in India, e.g. highest number of soldiers come from Uttar Pradesh which had 11 times more population but only 2.5 times soldiers than Haryana, Maharashtra and Rajasthan have 3.5 to 4.5 times more population than Haryana but they contribute only 1.2 to 1.4 times more soldiers then Haryana. Of these non-officer soldiers, 14.5% (1,67,557) soldier are from Uttar Pradesh (16.5% population of India), 7.7% (89,088) are from Punjab (2.3% population of India) in second place, 7.6% (87,835) are from Maharashtra (9.3% population of India), 6.9% (79,481) are from Rajasthan (5.6% population of India) in 4th place, 5.7% (65,987) are from Haryana (2% population of India) in 6th place, 4.1% (47,457) are from Jammu and Kashmir including Ladakh (1% population of India) in 10th place, 4% (46,960) are from Himachal Pradesh (0.6% population of India) in 11th place.

Every year more than 6,000 soldiers from Haryana join the Indian military. Bisahan in Jhajjar district, a village of 700 families with at least one person from each family in military, has a reputation of being most prolific contributor to the Indian military. In Haryana, a state dominated by the martial race (jats are 30% population of Haryana) where people traditionally & culturally aspire to join the military, excelling in sports provides better opportunity to secure a military job, and military in turn also nurtures the athletes. "Indian Army had laid the foundation for the state to become a sports nursery" as people of haryana traditionally joined the military which nurtured the sporting talent. "The state’s domination in sports is somehow linked to the majority of its people’s collective preference for a robust physique that helps them work the fields under a sweltering sun, get jobs in the military, and indulge in sporting activities, more likely wrestling, experts say."

==== Sports ====
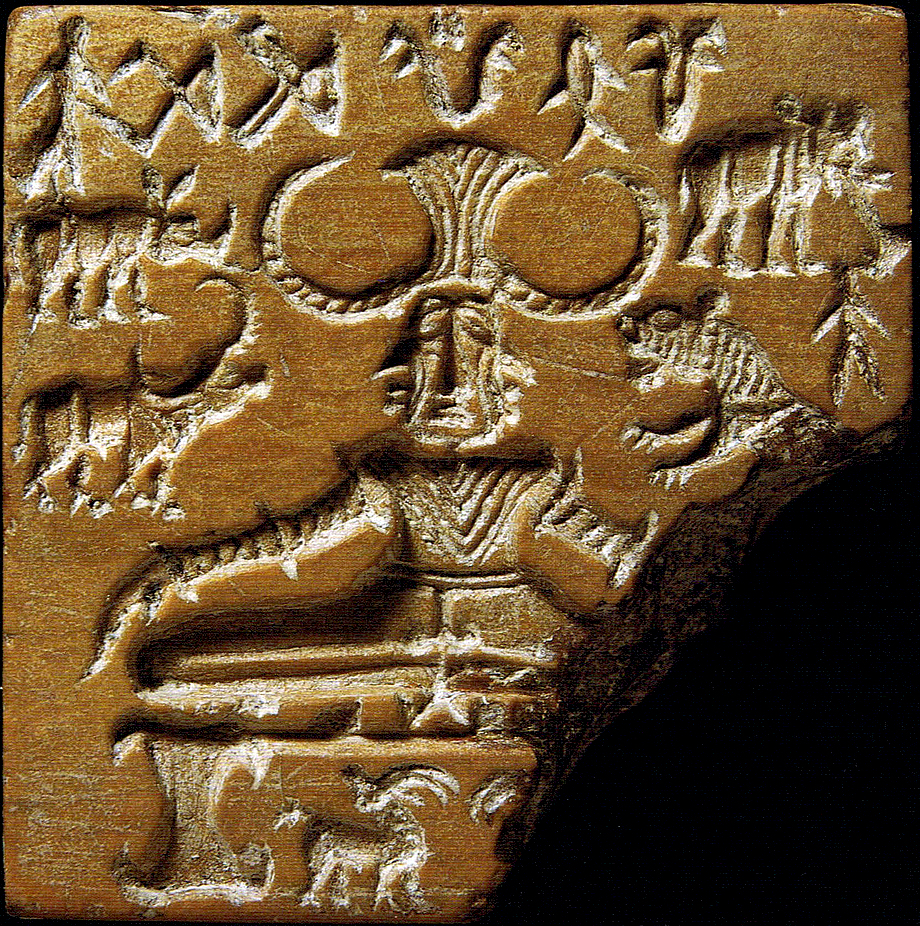
Pashupati Shiva in yoga pose from Indus Valley civilisation.

Pashupati Shiva in yoga pose from Indus Valley civilisation.

Dominance of Haryana in India's international medals.

"Haryana" is known as "India's Olympian state", "The Sports State of India", "country's sports nursery", "sports powerhouse" in "multiple disciplines"", due to their dominance in India's international medals "across categories and gender". With only 1.3% area and 1.5% population of India, Haryana consistently has been a top contributor of India's medals in major international events with 30% to 70% individual medals of India won by the people from Haryana. "Unlike other states, sports and issues related to sports in Haryana come under great scrutiny."

In Olympics, Haryana has won 52% (13/25) individual medals of India after Paris Olympics,2024. In Asian Games, Haryana won 38% (18/48) individual & 26% (18/69) of total medals in 2018, 63% (23/36) individual & 40% (23/57) of total medals in 2014.

In Commonwealth Games (CWG), Haryana won 42% (20/53) of individual & 33% (20/61) of total medals in 2022 CWG, 41% (22/54) individual & 33% (22/66) of total medals in 2018 CWG, 32% (19/61) individual & 30% (19/64) of total medals in 2014 CWG, 32% (32/101) of medals in 2010 CWG, 10% (5/50) medals in 2006 CWG.

Haryana (& its capital Chandigarh) is always among top 3 in the medal tally of National Games, Khelo India University Games, Khelo India Youth Games, etc.

In the last 5 Khelo India national games, Haryana stood number-1 2-times and number-2 3-times on the overall medal tally.

The actual number of medals from Haryana is much higher because Haryanvi players also represent Services and other states.

The success of Haryana is due to government's policy intervention, rich reward system and job security for the budding athletes and the winners, where deep cultural interest of martial castes in military and traditional sports meets the state infrastructure and incentives provided by the Haryana state government. Plenty of analysis pieces attribute Haryana’s success in contact sports (boxing and wrestling) to the physical strength of the Jats, the influence of history and geography which has shaped the population. Indian Army had laid the foundation for the state to become a sports nursery" as people of haryana traditionally joined the military which nurtured the sporting talent. "The state’s domination in sports is somehow linked to the majority of its people’s collective preference for a robust physique that helps them work the fields under a sweltering sun, get jobs in the military, and indulge in sporting activities, more likely wrestling, experts say."

National Games of India

In National Games of India medals tally, Haryana is always among top three states.

Khelo India Games

In Khelo India Youth Games, since it began in 2018 and till 2022, Haryana topped the medal tally in 2 editions and achieved second slot in 3 editions.

In Khelo India University Games, the universities from Haryana are always among top 3.

In National School Games, in June 2023 Haryana (109 medals) stood second behind Delhi (126), both of which have same ethnic demography.

Olympics

Till 2020, India has won 21 individual metals, of which 19 have been won by the Indian citizens excluding 2 individual medals won by the India-born British-citizen Norman Pritchard. Of these 19 individual medals, at least 47% (9/19) have been won by athletes with connection with Haryana.

In 2024 Olympics, Haryana won 67% (4 out of total 6) medals for India including 100% (1/1) silver and 60% (3/5) bronze. 50% (3/6) medals for India won by jats.

In 2020 Olympics, Haryana won 50% (3 out of total 6) medals for India including 100% gold (1/1), 50% (1/2) silver and 33% (1/3) bronze. 33% (2/6) medals for India won by jats.

In 2016 Olympics, Haryana won 50% (1 out of total 2) medals for India. 50% (1/2) medals for India won by jats.

In 2012 Olympics, 67% (4 out of total 6) medal winners are associated with Haryana. 50% (3/6) medals for India won by jats.

In 2008 Olympics, 100% (3 out of total 3) medal winners are associated with Haryana. Vijender Singh from Bhiwani, Abhinav Bindra from Chandigarh and Sushil Kumar's ancestral village in Sonipat. 67% (2/3) medals for India won by jats.

Asian Games

In 2018 Asian Games, Haryana won 38% (18/48) individual & 26% (18/69) of total medals for India. Haryana (18 or 26%, 5G+5S+8B) was followed by Tamilnadu (12 or 17%) and 9 or 13% each for Delhi, UP, Kerala. Jats won 35% (24/69) India's medals, including 60% (9/15) gold, 30% (7/24) silver and 27% (8/30) bronze.

In 2014 Asian Games, Haryana won 63% (23/36) individual & 40% (23/57) of total medals for India.

Commonwealth Games

In 2022 CWG, with a contingent of 21% (43/210) the Haryana sportspersons won 42% (20/53) of individual & 33% (20/61) of total medals for India including 43% (9/21) gold, 25% (4/16) silver and 31% (7/23) bronze. Jats dominated India's medal tally, they won 40% (21/53) total, 41% (9/22), 29% (3/16), 44% (9/23) bronze medals of India.

In 2018 CWG, with a contingent of 13% (28/218) the Haryana sportspersons won 41% (22/54) individual & 33% (22/66) of total medals for India including 35% (9/26) gold, 30% (6/20) silver and 35% (7/20) bronze. Jats dominated the medals.

In 2014 CWG, Haryana won 32% (19/61) individual & 30% (19/64) of total medals for India.

In 2010 CWG, with 10% (50 from Haryana out of India's 495) athletes Haryana won 32% (32/101) of medals for India. 24% (24/101) of India's & 75% of Haryana's (24/32) individual medals were won by jats from Haryana (excluding medals won by jats from other states). Haryanvi jats won more than half of India's gold medals. These games had 50 Jats from all states who won 27% (27/101) individual medals for India (excludes 4 jats who won medal as part of hockey team, also excludes jats playing for other nations).

In 2006 CWG, Haryana won 10% (5/50) medals for India including 5% (1/22) gold, 18% (3/17) silver and 9% (1/11) bronze.

Wrestling Championships

In April 2023 Asian Wrestling Championships in Kaxakastan, all 14 medals were won by Haryanvi jats.

In June, U21 & U17 Asian Wrestling Championship in Kyrgyzstan all 9 female medal winners were haryanvi jats, who won 7 gold, 1 silver and 1 bronze.

==== Transport ====
===== Aviation =====
- Existing airports in Haryana:
  - Civil airports
    - Bhiwani Airport
    - Hisar Airport
    - Karnal Aerodrome
    - Narnaul Airport
    - Pinjore Aerodrome
  - Minor civil airstrip
    - Gurugram Airstrip (Bhondsi Airstrip or Silokhera Airstrip)
  - Dual-use
    - Ambala Air Force Station with civil aviation enclave Ambala Domestic Airport
  - Military use only
    - Sirsa Air Force Station no civil aviation enclave

In 1919, the first airstrip was built in Haryana when Ambala Air Force Station was established. Following the independence of India in 1947, in 1947–48, the first Flying Instruction School (FIS) of the Indian Air Force was formed there.

By 1964, the diversionary Indian Air Force airfield, Sirsa Air Force Station at Sirsa, was ready.

In 1965, Hisar airfield, spread over 194 acres (79 ha), was built for the Hisar Aviation Club. In 1999, Hisar Aviation Club was merged with Haryana Institute of Civil Aviation (HICA). The airport is managed by HICA, which provides flight training using light aircraft.

In 1967, Karnal Aerodrome was set up. The Karnal Flying Club has been running at this airfield since then.

In 1970–71, a privately managed air service was introduced from Delhi-Patiala-Hisar and Delhi which was terminated after a period of about 6 months due to being financially unviable.

During the 1980s, the Gurugram Airstrip, hangar, air conditioned yoga ashram and TV studio were built by former Prime Minister Indira Gandhi's favourite godman and yoga guru Dhirendra Brahmachari, who died in 1994 in a plane crash. Indira used to visit Brahmachari here once a week. The 1980s teleserials India Quiz and Hum Log (ran from July 1984 to 17 December 1985) were shot here. Brahmachari charged INR25,000 per shift for the use of the ashram's TV studio facilities for the shooting of Hum Log. In 1983, Brahmachari wrote a letter to then Chief Minister of Haryana, Bhajan Lal, with a request to acquire 5,000 acres (2,000 ha) of land around Aravalli Range, potentially up to 70,000 acres (28,000 ha) acres in total, to build facilities to rival Disneyland, including a yoga research and training centre, a wildlife sanctuary, folk arts and crafts centre, amusement centre and other facilities such as helipad, aquarium, planetarium and games and thrillers. The aircraft hangar still has two derelict aircraft belonging to Brahmachari, likely including a Maule M-5 American aircraft owned by him that landed him in investigations for tax evasions. Ownership of some of the facilities is currently being disputed in the court (c. 2014), including 32 acre land and yoga studio.

In 2002, the Delhi Flying Club (DFC) shifted all its flying activities and aircraft to Hisar from Safdarjung Airport in Delhi.

On 31 January 2010, the Rajiv Gandhi National Centre for Aero Sports was inaugurated at Narnaul Airport. 51 acres were acquired for this purpose. Chief Minister Bhupinder Singh Hooda and Aero Club of India President Satish Sharma were present at the inauguration ceremony. The centre was set up by Aero Club of India and the Civil Aviation Department, Haryana. It is the first ever modern state-of-the-art aero sports centre in India to provide training in comprehensive range of various aero sports, including para-jumping (simulated parachute jump from a tower), parasailing, hot air ballooning, gliding, power flying, sky diving, aero modelling and micro light flying, with the purpose of introducing the state's youth to aviation and providing the general population a cheap opportunity to experience aero sports.

In August 2018, a pre-feasibility study and field study for three new greenfield airports in Haryana commenced at a cost of INR30 lakh (3 million). One site chosen was the disused Chharra Airfield (Jhajjar district); the other two proposed airports would serve Jind and Kurukshetra.

On 26 December 2018, Haryana Health Minister Anil Vij announced that a third domestic airport would be established under the UDAN III scheme 40 km from the Ambala city at Barnala village next to the Ambala Air Force Station, for which a team of Airports Authority of India had already carried out the land survey. The new greenfield airport at Ambala is included in the 13 airports included in the UDAN III scheme. Since most of the technical formalities were complete, an early execution of the project was expected. Hisar and Karnal airports are already included in the list of airports for which airlines can make proposals for the UDAN scheme.

As of January 2019, all five existing government airports in Haryana were to be developed to have runways of at least 5000 feet in length for midsize aircraft and business jets, night landing and parking hangars, as airlines have approached the Haryana government to park their spillover "Non-scheduled Air Operations" (NSOP) aircraft from the congested IGI airport at Delhi to Bhiwani and Narnaul airport. Some of this development work at Hisar, Bhiwani and Narnaul airports was already underway at the time of the announcement. Hisar's runway was scheduled be extended to 10,000 ft by March 2022 for large aircraft.

In 2021, Gurugram Heliport Hub was envisaged and implementation started in 2024.

===== Railway =====
Railway in Haryana falls in 2 railway zones (Northern Railway zone and North Western Railway zone), and 3 divisions under those.

===== Roads and highways =====
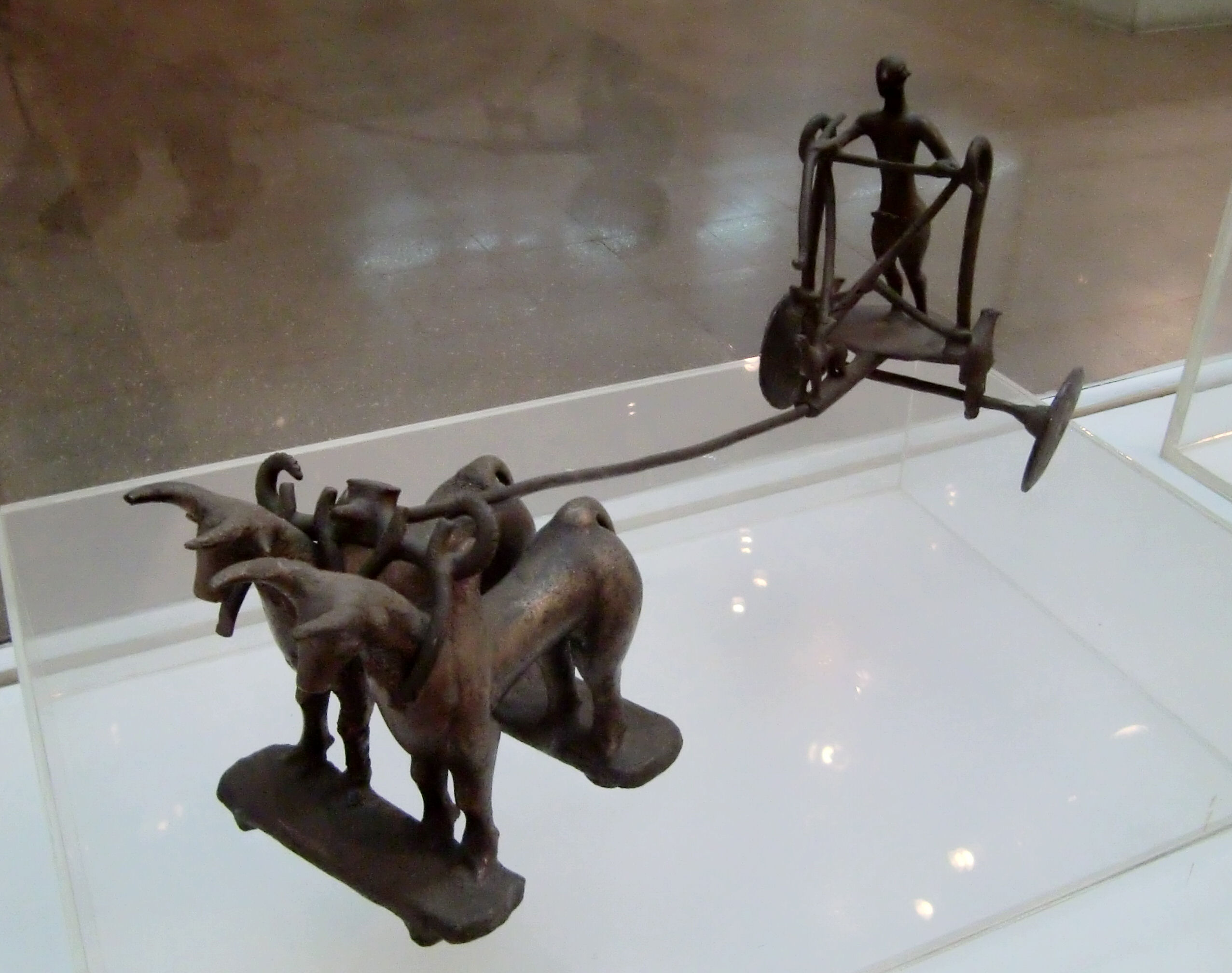
Coach driver from Indus Valley civilisation.

GT Road with Kos Minar and Caravanserais

=== Military ===
The modern military history commenced with British colonial rule where George Thomas established modern European style army in 1798 to 1801, and later Colonel James Skinner (1778 – 4 December 1841) the Anglo-Indian military adventurer in India, who founded 1st Skinner's Horse and 3rd Skinner's Horse at Asigarh Fort at Hansi in 1803, which are still part of the Indian Army.

As of January 2020, 139 (>10%) out of 1,322 Vir Chakra in India have been awarded to soldiers from Haryana, which has less than 2% population of India.

Current military installations in Haryana are:

- Indian Army
  - Ambala Cantonment
  - Chandimandir Cantonment
  - Hisar Military Station
- Indian Air Force
  - Ambala Air Force Station
  - Gurugram Air Force Station is an ammunition dump
  - Raja Nahar Singh Faridabad Air Force Logistics Station
  - Sirsa Air Force Station
- Indian Navy
  - Information Management and Analysis Centre (IMAC) at Gurugram
- Border Security Force
  - Hisar BSF Camp
- Central Reserve Police Force (CRPF)
  - Hisar CRPF Camp
- Central Industrial Security Force (CISF)
  - Mandawar CISF, Sohna
- National Security Guard (NSG) at Manesar

Defunct British-era military installations in Haryana:

- Asigarh Fort at Hansi
- Karnal Cantonment
- Bharawas, 7 km southwest of Rewari (not to be confused with nearby Bariawas 7 km to the southeast of Rewari)
- Jharsa cantonment and palace of Begum Samru (b.1753 – d.1836), which later became a British cantonment at the same place when Bharwas cantonment was reclocated to Jharsa in Gurugram.

Other cantonments

- Buria cantonment of Sikh ruler during British colonial rule
- Bahadurgarh state cantonment of nawab during British colonial rule
- Balramgarh state cantonment ofRaja Nahar Singh during British colonial rule
- Dujana cantonment of nawab during British colonial rule
- Jhajjar cantonment of nawab during British colonial rule
- Jind State cantonment of nawab Sikh ruler at Jind during British colonial rule
- Kalsia cantonment ofSikh ruler during British colonial rule
- Kapurthala State (Narwana cantonment) of Phulkian Sikh Raja
- Loharu State cantonment of nawab at Loharu during British colonial rule

=== Museums ===
- Ambala
  - 1857 War Heroes Memorial
  - Aryabhatta Vigyan Kendra (science centre), located adjacent to the 1857 War Memorial, it houses multiple exhibits across 4 floors with 3D auditorium & planetarium, space science gallery with Indian space technology and satellites, digital adventure gallery for modern science and technology, agricultural technology, popular science, astronomical observatory with telescope for evening sky watching.
- Chandigarh
  - International Dolls Museum
- Gurugram
  - Heritage Transport Museum, Gurgaon
  - Museo Camera
- Hansi
  - Rakhigarhi Indus Valley Civilisation Museum
  - Sheikhpura Kothi near Hansi
- Hisar
  - Haryana Rural Antique Museum at HAU Hisar
  - Jahaj Kothi Museum at Firoz Shah Palace Complex is a zonal museum.
- Jind
  - Jayanti Devi Archaeological Museum at Jind.
- Kurukshetra
  - Dharohar Museum at Kurukshetra University
  - Jyotisar Anubhav Kendra
  - Kurukshetra Panorama and Science Centre
  - Shrikrishna Museum
  - Thanesar Archaeological Site Museum inside Sheikh Chilli's Tomb
- Panipat
  - Panipat Museum near Western Yamuna Canal at Binjhol village 5 km from Panipat
- Punchkula
  - Bhima Devi Temple Site Museum
  - Haryana State Museum has a 7 story building with 12 themed galleries, such as the pre-historic, proto-historic (Sindhu-Saraswati civilisation), Vedic period, early historic (e.g. Kushan), medieval (e.g. Sultanate period), British colonial, and modern period housing artifacts excavated from archaeological sites in Haryana such as Rakhigarhi (artifacts and skeletons), Agroha mound, Sugh, Karsola, and Kunal, etc.
  - Pinjore Garden Site Museum at Pinjore Gardens in Pinjore is a site museum.
- Rewari
  - Rewari Railway Heritage Museum at Rewari railway station
- Yamunanagar
  - Guru Gobind Singh Martial Art Museum

=== Polity ===
==== Vedic era ====
===== Mahajanapadas =====
Following Mahajanapadas are mentioned in Mahabharata had their land in Haryana:

- Kuru kingdom, most of area of Haryana fell under this kingdom, their main capital in Haryana was at Swarnprastha (Sonipat), other 3 capital or main cities were Indraprastha (Delhi), Waghparastha (Baghpat in Uttar Prades) and Tilprastha (Tilpat in Haryana)
- Matsya Kingdom, present day South Haryana
- Surasena, present day Hodal as part of Braj region.

Ancient Khandavprastha forest mentioned in Mahabharata, lay to the west of Yamuna river in modern-day Delhi territory. Pandavas cleared this forest to construct their capital city called Indraprastha. This forest was earlier inhabited by Naga tribes led by a king named Takshaka. Arjuna and Krishna cleared this forest by setting up a fire. The inhabitants of this forest were displaced. This was the root cause of the enmity of the Naga Takshaka towards the Kuru kings who ruled from Indraprastha and Hastinapura.

===== Janapads =====
The list of Janapadas falling within Haryana:

==== Princely states of late medieval and British colonial era ====
- States at the time of independence
  - With headquarter based in Haryana
    - Buria State of Sikhs
    - Dujana State of Nawab
    - Jind State of Phulkian Misl Sandhu Sikhs
    - Kunjpura State of Nawab
    - Loharu State
    - Pataudi State
  - With headquarter based outside of Haryana with parts of territory within Haryana
    - Kapurthala State of Phulkian Misl Sandhu Sikhs included Narwana
    - Nabha State of Phulkian Misl Sandhu Sikhs
    - Malerkotla State of Nawab
    - Patiala State of Phulkian Misl Sandhu Sikhs included Charkhi Dadri
- Abolished states, due to Indian Rebellion of 1857 or for other reasons.
  - Rewari State Abolished in 1857. The Last Ruler Rao Tula Ram was the key instigator of revolt.
  - Ballabhgarh State of Tewatias. Abolished after 1857 revolution and Raja Nahar Singh hanged to death by British.
  - Charkhi Dadri State
  - Jhajjar State of Nawab
  - Farrukhnagar State of Nawab
- Abolished states, at other times
  - Hansi State of James Skinner and George Thomas
  - Jharsa of Begum Samru
  - Kaithal State of Sikhs of Phulkia Sidhu clan
  - Rania State of Sikhs, Ranghars of Johiya and Bhatti clans

=== Religion ===
==== Buddhism ====
Main sites are

- Mounds: Agroha Mound, Sugh Ancient Mound,
- Pillars of Ashoka: Hisar, Fatehabad, Topra Kalan Edicts Museum
- Stupas, pagodas and places in the order of travel by Lord Buddha:
  - From Mathura in Uttar Pradesh, Buddha travelled along Grand Trunk Road in Haryana (also see Buddhist pilgrimage sites in Haryana).
  - Kamashpura Aastha Pugdal Pagoda (Kumashpur) in Sonipat city, the place where Buddha gave Mahasatipatthana sutta.
  - Kurukshetra Stupa on the banks of sacred Brahma Sarovar in Kurukshetra city was also visited by Hieun Tsang,
- Topra between Kurukshetra and Yamunanagar, now has a large open air museum park housing several replica of Ashoka's edicts including largest Ashoka Chakra in the world, original site of Ashokan pillar which was moved to Feroz Shah Kotla in Delhi in 1356 CE by Firuz Shah Tughlaq.
  - Srughna, now known as the Sugh Ancient Mound, on outskirts of Yamunanagar city
  - Chaneti Buddhist Stupa, on outskirts of Yamunanagar city, according to Hieun Tsang it was built by the King Ashoka.
- Other Stupas: Adi Badri Sharirika stupa, Assandh Kushan stupa

==== Hinduism ====
- Adi Badri
- Agroha Dham
- Baba Thakur
- Bhima Devi Temple Complex at Pinjore
- Bhuteshwar Temple
- Chhapadeshwar Mahadev Mandir
- Dhosi Hill
- Eklavya temple
- Gurugram Bhim Kund
- Jayanti Devi Temple
- Jhirkeshwar mahadev
- Kalesar Mahadev
- Kapal Mochan
- Kurukshetra: 48 kos parikrama of Kurukshetra Harsh ka Tilla at Kurukshetra, Brahma Sarovar and Sannihit Sarovar, Jyotisar, Kartikeya Temple, Pehowa
- Kalayat Ancient Bricks Temple Complex
- Mata Mansa Devi
- Saketri Shiv Mandir
- Narnaul
- Pindara Temple
- Sheetla Mata Mandir Gurgaon
- Sharda Mata
- Sita Mai Temple
- Sthaneshwar Mahadev Temple
- Surajkund
- Tosham
- Nar Narayan Cave in Yamuna Nagar
- State Protected Monuments
- Monuments of National Importance

==== Jainism ====
- Dehra Temple
- Ranila Jain temple
- Agroha

==== Sikhism ====
- Kapal Mochan Gurudwara
- Lohgarh Fort
- Pehowa

== See also ==
- Eastern Punjab (disambiguation)
- Punjabi Suba movement
- Administrative divisions of Haryana
- History of Punjab
- Patiala and East Punjab States Union
- History of India
- Timeline of Indian history
