= Bhiwani Airport =

Airport of Haryana, India

- IATA: none; ICAO: VIBW; GPS: VIBW

Summary
- Airport type: Public
- Owner: Civil Aviation Department, Haryana
- Location: Bhiwani, Haryana
- Time zone: IST (UTC+05:30)
- Elevation AMSL: 225 m (738 ft)
- Coordinates: 28°50′02″N 76°10′43″E
- Website: www.haraviation.gov.in

Map
- Location of airport in India VIBW (India)

Runways
Direction	Length		Surface
Direction	m	ft	Surface
	1,066	4,100	Asphalt

Statistics (2017)
- Hub for the number of airlines: 0
- Number of scheduled airlines flying in: 0
- Number of scheduled weekly flights: 0
- Number of scheduled flight passengers: 0
- Number of runways: 1

Bhiwani Aerodrome (ICAO: VIBW), also called Bhiwani Air Strip, is a public civil aerodrome adjacent to Gujrani village in the Bhiwani district of the Indian state of Haryana.

== History ==
In 1948, first airstrip was built in Haryana when Ambala Air Force Station was established.

In 1975, Bhiwani airstip was built on 128 acre with 1070 m runway and one hangar.

On 31 July, 2013, the Chief Minister of Haryana announced that the Government of Haryana had applied for an expansion of the civilian airports namely Hisar Airport, Karnal Airport, Bhiwani Airport, Pinjore Airport and Narnaul Airport. Approval was granted by the central government for plans of the Hisar Domestic Airport and Karnal Domestic Airport. Discussions with the central government also considered setting up an additional cargo airport in the state.

In July 2014, a Right to Information (RTI) request revealed that the Directorate General of Civil Aviation (India) (DGCA) had never received a formal proposal from the Congress Government of Haryana and there were no plans to upgrade the airport.

As of January 2019, extension of runway was underway. The night landing facilities and hangar will also be built as airlines have approached the Haryana government to park their spillover "Non-scheduled Air Operations" (NSOP) aircraft from the congested IGI airport at Delhi to Bhiwani and Narnaul airport. Consequently, all five existing government airports in Haryana will be developed to have runway of at least 5000 feet (1524 m), night landing and parking hangars.

In 2024, runway length was increased 190 m to 1260m (4133 ft) to allow landing of medium size aircraft.

In 2025, notification was issued to acquire additional 208-acre land of two village to further expand runway to allow larger cargo aircraft operation. There is also demand to build additional hangars and infrastructure for container operation.

== Flights ==
Currently, the airport has no scheduled commercial flight operations. The Haryana Institute of Civil Aviation (HICA) does not offer flying training nor preparation courses.

== Infrastructure ==
As of 2018, airport has one hangar, a VIP lounge, day & night landing facilities.

== Flight training school ==
As of 2025, Haryana Institute of Civil Aviation (HICA) runs flight training schools from Bhiwani. Since 2021, FSTC Flying School Pvt Ltd provides training for Private Pilot License (PPL), Commercial Pilot License (CPL), and Instrument Ratings (IR) for both single-engine and multi-engine aircraft with a modern fleet of Cessna 172S, Piper PA-28-181 Archer III, and Tecnam P2008.

== See also ==
- List of airports in India by state
  - Airports Authority of India
  - List of busiest airports in India
  - List of Indian Air Force bases
- Divisions of Haryana
- List of highways in Haryana
- Railway in Haryana
