= GPL (disambiguation) =

GPL is the GNU General Public License, a free software license.

GPL may also refer to:

== Sport and gaming ==
- Garena Premier League, a League of Legends league
- Goa Professional League, a football league in India

== Other uses ==
- Glider pilot license
- General-purpose programming language
- General Price Level
