= Dabua =

Dabua Colony is one of the north-western colonies in the district of Faridabad, Haryana, India, founded in 1970. The original name of this place is Firoz Gandhi Nagar. It is the location of Raja Nahar Singh Faridabad Air Force Logistics Station, which is tagged as Sector 50 on the Indian Air Force map. A culturally mixed area, Dabua is dominated by people coming from the interior of Uttar Pradesh, usually in search of jobs in Delhi and the National Capital Region. Almost 10% of Dabua is in the shadow of the air force station.

== Geography ==
Dabua is located at 28.43°N 77.32°E. It has an average elevation of 198 metres (650 ft).

The climate of the colony can be classified as tropical steppe, semi-arid and hot; the climate is extremely dry except during the monsoon season. During three months of south-west monsoon, usually the last week of June to September, the moist oceanic air penetrates into the colony and causes high humidity, cloudiness, and heavy rainfall. The period from October to December squashes post-monsoon rains. The winter spans from January to the beginning of March and is followed by the summer season which lasts until the last week of June.

Colony

Climate chart (precipitation, max. and min. temperature)
| J | F | M | A | M | J | J | A | S | O | N | D |
| 20 21 7 | 25 24 11 | 15 30 15 | 20 36 21 | 41 41 26 | 97 38 27 | 190 35 27 | 201 34 27 | 134 34 25 | 12 33 19 | 4 28 13 | 10 23 8 |
- █ Average max. and min. temperatures in °C
- █ Precipitation totals in mm
Imperial conversion
| J | F | M | A | M | J | J | A | S | O | N | D |
| 0.8 70 45 | 1 75 52 | 0.6 86 59 | 0.8 97 70 | 1.6 106 79 | 3.8 100 81 | 7.5 95 81 | 7.9 93 81 | 5.3 93 77 | 0.5 91 66 | 0.2 82 55 | 0.4 73 46 |
- █ Average max. and min. temperatures in °F
- █ Precipitation totals in inches

== Demography ==
Dabua Colony has an average literacy rate of 77%, higher than the national average of 59.5%. The male literacy rate is 87% and female literacy is 59%. 17% of the population of the Colony is under 6 years of age. Dabua Colony contains many castes, 82% Hindu, 5% Muslim and the rest are from other minor religions.

== Economy ==
Dabua Colony is the central bazaar for 10–12 nearby villages. There are separate market spots for food grains, vegetables and fruits. The colony is home to some small scale industries, and is mainly a hub of mechanical and light engineering goods industries.

== Military ==
The Indian Air Force (IAF) operates Raja Nahar Singh Faridabad Air Force Logistics Station in the colony. The resident unit is No. 56 Air Storage Park as well as the Air Force Guard Dog Training Unit. The IAF Base is commanded by a group captain of the Logistics Branch. Formerly, a SA-2 SAM Squadron was also based in Dabua. Although there is no army organisation in the city, many retired army officers are settled there.
