= Heritage Transport Museum, Gurgaon =

Coordinates: 28.2530°N 76.9243°E

Heritage Transport Museum
- Established: 2013
- Location: Tauru, Nuh district, Haryana, India
- Type: Transportation museum
- Collections: Automobile Gallery, Pre-mechanised Transportation, Heavy Mechanised Transportation, Railways, Aviation, Rural Transportation, Two-Wheelers, Collectible India Toys on Transport, Historical Collections, Maritime Gallery, Contemporary Art Gallery, Tribal Art

The Heritage Transport Museum is India's major museum dealing with the history of human transportation. It is located at Tauru (Taoru) in the Nuh district of the state of Haryana. The collection focuses on the development of transport in India. It is situated on 3.01 acres and has 95,000 square feet of exhibition galleries. When it opened in 2013 it became India's largest private museum.

== Organization ==
The museum is laid out in twelve collections:

- Automobile Gallery
- Pre-mechanised Transportation
- Heavy Mechanised Transportation
- Railways
- Aviation
- Rural Transportation
- Two-Wheelers
- Collectible India Toys on Transport
- Historical Collections
- Maritime Gallery
- Contemporary Art Gallery
- Tribal Art

== See also ==
- List of Museums in Haryana
