= Gujrani =

- Village
- Location in Haryana, India Gujrani (India)
- Coordinates: 28.844°N 76.159°E
- Country: India
- State: Haryana
- District: Bhiwani
- Tehsil: Bhiwani

Government
  - Body: Village panchayat

Population (2011)
  - Total: 4,883

Languages
  - Official: Hindi
- Time zone: UTC+5:30 (IST)
- PIN: 127031

Gujrani is a village in the Bhiwani district of the Indian state of Haryana. It lies approximately 6 kilometres (3.7 mi) north of the district headquarters town of Bhiwani. As of the 2011 Census of India, the village had 948 households with a total population of 4,883 of which 2,640 were male and 2,243 female. The village is located next to Bhiwani Airport.For political representational purposes the village is part of Tosham Assembly constituency and the Bhiwani-Mahendragarh Lok Sabha constituency.
