= Civil Aviation Department, Haryana =

Government of Haryana Civil Aviation Department, Haryana

Agency overview
- Jurisdiction: Government of Haryana
- Headquarters: Haryana Civil Secretariat, Sector-1, Chandigarh; 30°45′40″N 76°48′2″E
- Website: haraviation.gov.in

Civil Aviation Department, Haryana is a Ministry and department of the Government of Haryana in India.

== History ==
This department was created when after 1966 Haryana was established as a new state within India after being separated from Punjab. It has one autonomous body named Haryana Institute of Civil Aviation, for providing flying training to the students. Four airstrips at Pinjore, Bhiwani, Narnaul and Karnal in the state of Haryana comes under Civil Aviation. The department is undertaking expansion of civil aviation facilities at Hisar Airport.

== Aircraft ==
The department has two helicopters—a Eurocopter EC145C2 and a more modern H145D3 variant—and a Beechcraft B200GT King Air turboprop fixed wing aircraft. They are used for providing air transport facilities to VIPs.

== Airports in Haryana ==
=== Civil airports ===
==== Existing ====
In 2023, MRO hubs were being developed in all the airports except Narnaul. Narnaul Narnaul is helpful adventure sports with 1200 skydiving in 2023 and Pinjore is hub for hot air balloon.

- Ambala Airport, civil enclave
- Bhiwani Airport
- Gurugram Airport
- Hisar Airport
- Pinjore Airport
- Karnal Flying Club
- Narnaul Airport

==== Planned-greenfield ====
- Gurugram-Nuh Airport, next to Delhi–Mumbai Expressway, 100 acre land is being identified in 2023.
- Jind-Kaithal Airport, along Delhi-Katra Expressway, 100 acre land is being identified in 2023.

=== Military airports ===
- Ambala Air Force Station, with civil enclave
- Sirsa Air Force Station

established in 1976, without civil enclave

=== Heliport hubs ===
- Gurugram Heliport Hub

=== Airports around Haryana ===
==== Major international airports (clockwise) ====
- Chandigarh Airport
- IGI Airport at Delhi
- Jewar Airport (Taj/Noida/Agra Airport) at Jewar in UP across the border from Palwal in Haryana, under construction
- Jaipur Airport

==== Other airports (clockwise) ====
- Punjab
  - Bathinda Airport, 100 km north of Sirsa Airforce Station, 175 km northwest of Hisar airport
  - Ludhiana Sahnewal Airport, 125 km northwest of Ambala Airforce Station
  - Ludhiana Halwara Air Force Station, 125 km northwest of Ambala Airforce Station
  - Patiala Airport, 45 km west of Ambala Airforce Station, 80 km northwest of Kurukshetra airport (future), 110 km northwest of Karnal airport, 110 km northwest of Uchana (Narwana-Jind) future airport,
- Himachal Pradesh
  - Shimla Airport, 100 km northeast of airports at Chandigarh and Pinjore
  - Mandi Airport, 180 km northeast of airports at Chandigarh and Pinjore
  - Kullu Bhuntar Airport, 200 km northeast of airports at Chandigarh and Pinjore
  - Kangra Gaggal Airport, 250 km northeast of airports at Chandigarh and Pinjore
- Uttarakhand
  - Chinyalisaur Maa Ganga Airport, 240-260 km northeast of airports at Chandigarh, Pinjore, Ambala and Karnal
  - Dehradun Jolly Grant Airport, 160-170 km northeast of airports at Chandigarh, Pinjore, Ambala and Karnal
- Uttar Pradesh
  - Sarsawa Air Force Station at Saharanpur without civil enclave, 70-80 km east from airports at Karnal (existing) and Kurukshetra (future), 100 km east from existing Pinjore and Chandigarh airports
  - Meerut Dr. Bhimrao Ambedkar Airstrip, 110 km east from airports at Karnal (existing) and Chhara (future)
  - Hindon Airport civil enclave at Ghaziabad in NCR
  - Moradabad Airport, upcoming airport 130 km east of Delhi
  - Aligarh Airport, upcoming airport 130 km southeast of Delhi, 65 km from Jewar, 100 km from Punhana
- Rajasthan
  - Suratgarh Air Force Station, airport 130 km west of Sirsa Airforce Station, 200 km northwest of Hisar airport
    - Bikaner Nal Airport, 275 km further west of Suratgarh
    - Phalodi Air Force Station, 150 km further west of Bikaner airport and 425 km further west of Suratgarh airport
  - Ganganagar Lalgarh Airport, 120 km northwest of Sirsa Airforce Station, 200 km northwest of Hisar airport

== See also ==
- Highways in Haryana
- Railway in Haryana
