= Raja Nahar Singh Faridabad Air Force Logistics Station =

Military base in India

Coordinates: 28.371888°N 77.276432°E

Raja Nahar Singh Faridabad Air Force Logistics Station (RAFLS), the 54 ASP logistics base of the Indian Air Force's Western Air Command (WAC), is located at sector-50 of Dabua colony of Faridabad city in Haryana state of India. Headed by a Logistics Group Captain, it is home of the Guard Dog Training Unit and the 56th Air Storage Park.

== History ==
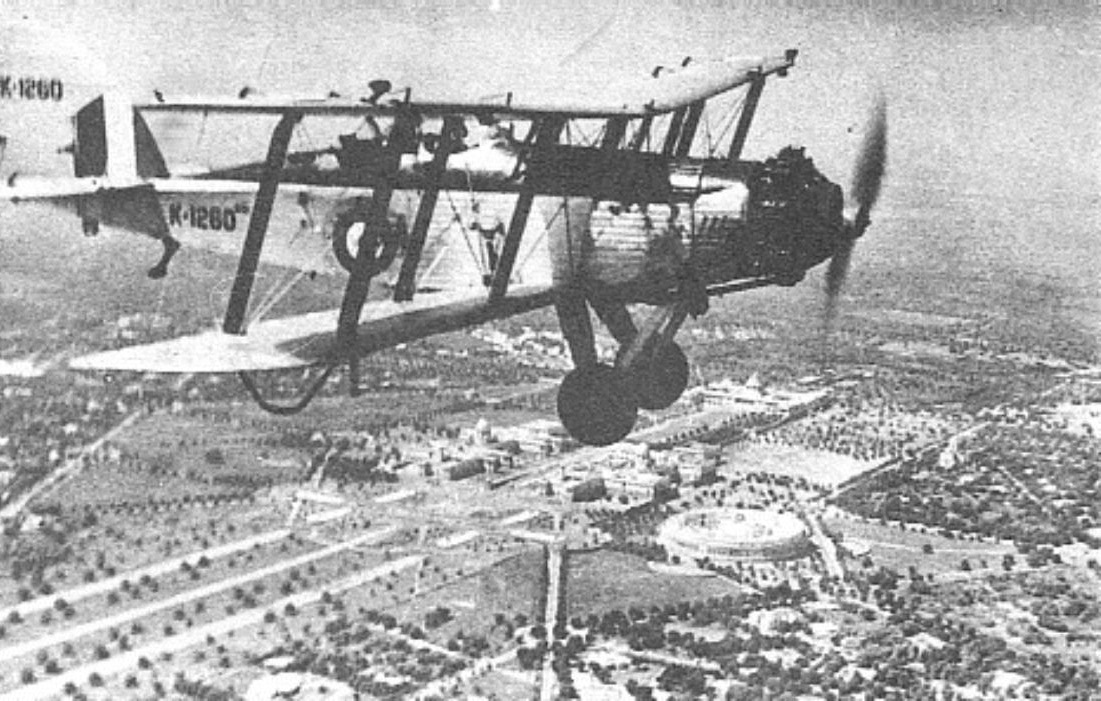
A Westland Wapiti, one of the first aircraft of the Indian Air Force.

On 8 October 1932, the Indian Air Force was established in British India as an auxiliary air force of Royal Air Force, and adopted the Royal Air Force uniforms, badges, brevets and insignia. In 1948, first airstrip was built in Haryana when Ambala Air Force Station was established following the independence of India. After the independence of India in 1947, an air force logistics base was established at Faridabad.

The Western Air Command (WAC), of which Raja Nahar Singh Faridabad Air Force Logistics Station is a key component within the National Capital Region, has been the major operational command involved in most of the war fought by India, including the Indo-Pakistani War of 1947, Sino-Indian War in 1962, the Indo-Pakistani War of 1965, Indo-Pakistan War of 1971, Operation Pawan (1986) in Sri Lanka and Operation Safed Sagar during the 1999 Kargil War, and the ongoing air logistics operations to supply troops deployed at Siachen Glacier.

== Facilities ==
This facility is headed by an Indian Air Force Officer of Group Captain rank from the Air Force Logistics wing. It has a Guard Dog Training Unit and the 56th Air Storage Park. The operations at Commands are supported by the technical and logistics wing at the Command and units level, and logistics wing is responsible for ensuring the supply and storage of spares and consumables. Air force logistics is challenging task due to the geographical diversity of weapon system sites and technological diversity of weapon systems and spares, high costs, and high lead times of military aviation equipments.

In addition to this logistics base at Dauba, IAF also has two firing range (AFRU - Air Force Range Unit), range 1 and range 2, at Tilpat within Faridabad.

== Issues ==
=== Illegal private construction ===
The 100 metres land around the air force stations and 900 meters around the ammunition depot is a protected zone where construction is not permitted as per the law. People mostly of lower middle class bought land near this station and constructed houses, neither the Air Force Station nor the local authorities objected earlier. It came into picture after PIL filed in High Court, more than 10000 houses and around 1L people living here, but govt data claims only 250 structures. In 2010, a public interest litigation (PIL) was filed in the Punjab and Haryana High Court to have these illegal structures removed. The local Municipal Corporation of Faridabad stopped providing proper roads and drainage facilities after this PIL, but the Court never gave order to stop providing basic amenities to the houses constructed in this area.

=== Illegal sand mining ===
In May 2018, Delhi High Court asked the government to ensure to protect the Tilpat 1 & 2 ranges of IAF on the banks of Yamuna river from the illegal sand mining.

== See also ==
- Ambala Air Force Base
- Gurugram Air Force Station
- Sirsa Air Force Station
- Hisar Military Station
- List of Indian Air Force bases
- List of Armed Forces Hospitals In India
- Railway in Haryana
- Road Highways and Expressways in Haryana
