= Pinjore Aerodrome =

Civil Airstrip in Haryana, India used for general operations and pilot training

Pinjore Airstrip and Flying Club
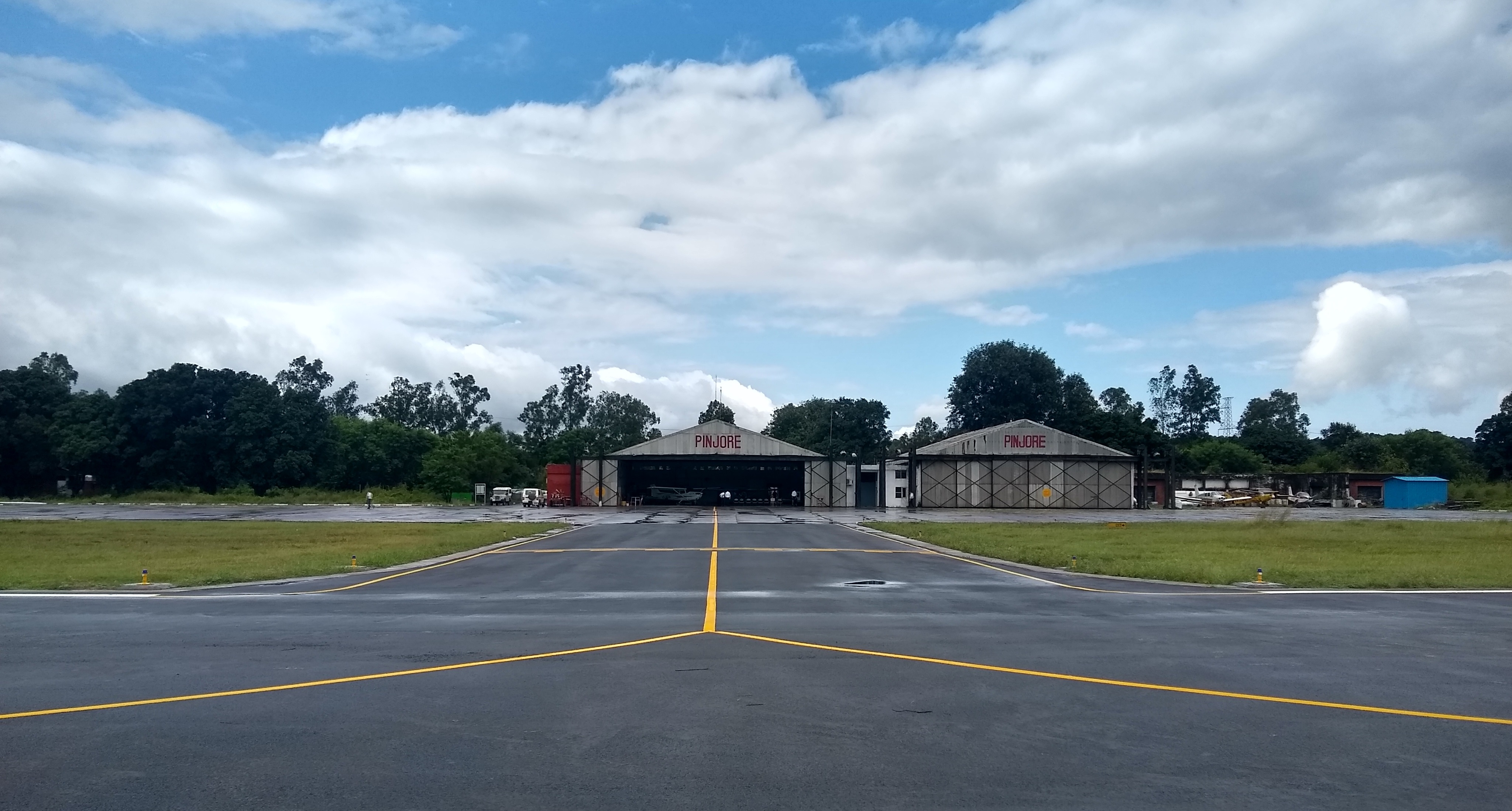
- IATA: none; ICAO: VI71; GPS: VI71

Summary
- Owner: Civil Aviation Department, Haryana
- Operator: Haryana Institute of Civil Aviation
- Location: Pinjore, Panchkula district
- Time zone: IST (UTC+05:30)
- Elevation AMSL: 536.4 m (1,760 ft)
- Coordinates: 30°49′16″N 76°53′30″E
- Website: www.haraviation.gov.in

Map
- Location of the airport in Haryana VI71 (India)

Runways
Direction	Length		Surface
Direction	m	ft	Surface
16/34	935	3,068	Asphalt

Statistics
- Number of Airplanes: 4
- Number of runways: 1

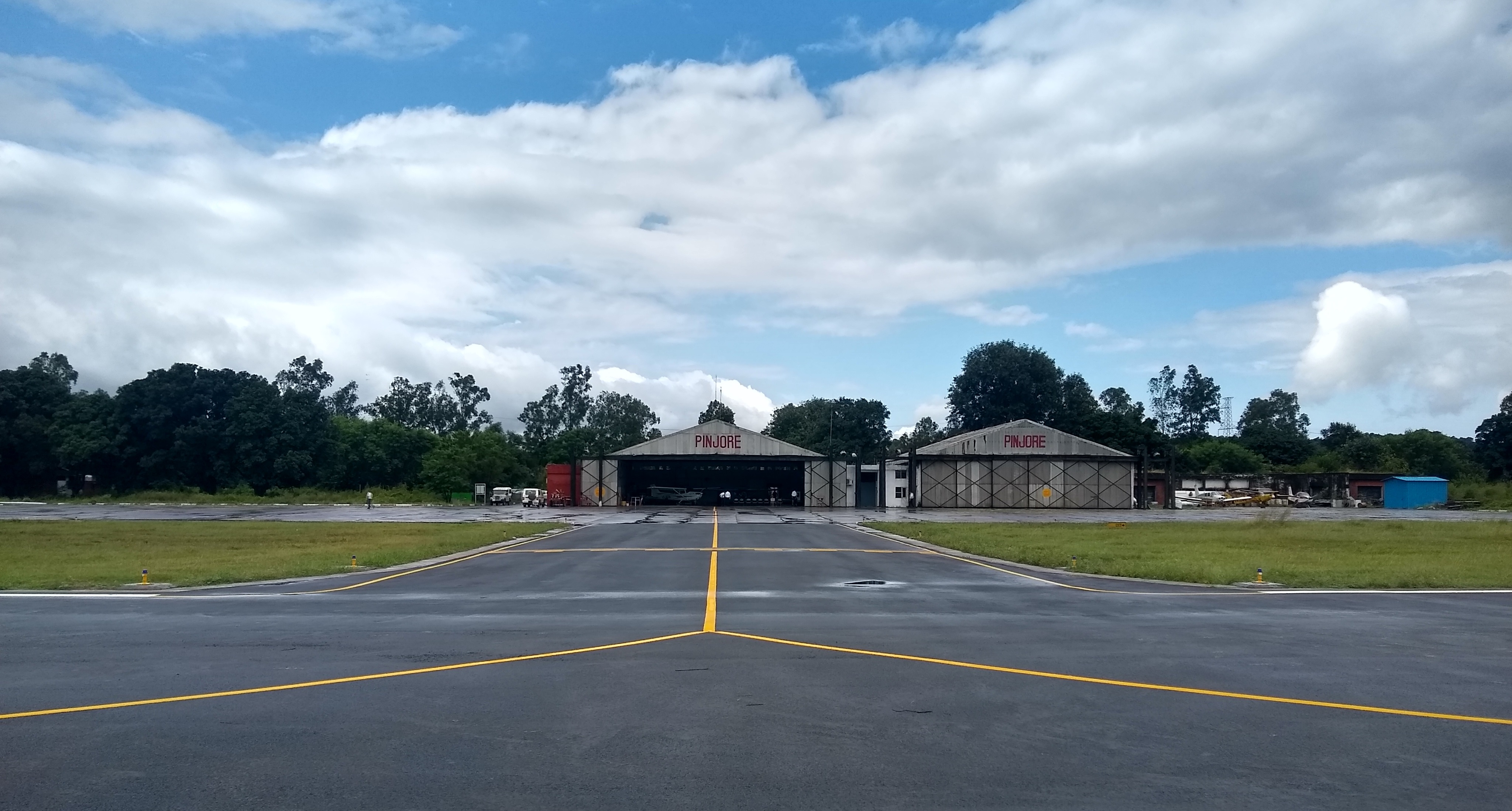
A view of Hangars from the Runway at Pinjore Airfield

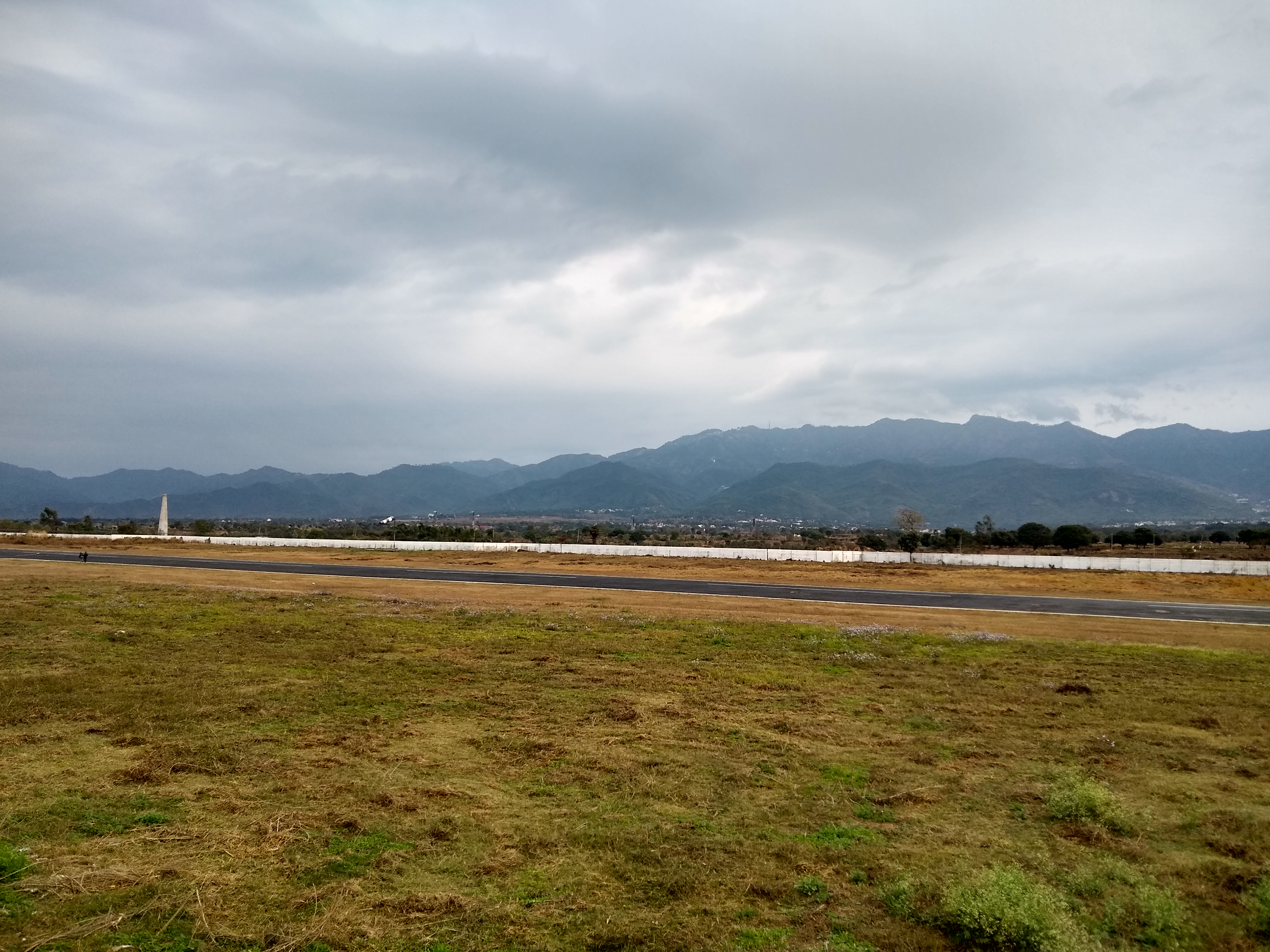
Shivalik Hills - A view from the runway on a rainy day!

Pinjore Airfield is being operated as a pilot training institute owned and operated by Haryana Institute of Civil Aviation (HICA) under guidance of Civil Aviation Department, Government of Haryana. The flying school is spread over an area of 96 acres and is located on Pinjore-Baddi main highway near the cities of Kalka and Pinjore in the Panchkula district of the Indian state of Haryana.

Pinjore Flying Club was established in the year 1991 by the Civil Aviation Department of Haryana and is the home base of Haryana Institute of Civil Aviation (HICA). Other than this, the airfield is often used by Haryana Government as well as VIP charter aircraft and helicopters. The airfield lies in a valley and is surrounded by beautiful Lower Shivalik and Morni Hills from three sides. Weather is usually stable except strong cross winds during the months of March to May.

== Infrastructure ==
Pinjore Airfield is spread over an area of 96 acres which includes a runway strip of 3000'×120', an administrative block, two hangars of size 100'×75' and 96'×70' size, a student lounge, a VIP Lounge, a hostel and residential quarters for the officers and staff. As of 2018, it had two four-seater Cessna-172 R and one two-seater Cessna 152 FA aircraft. The apron area can easily accommodate 10 - 12 small aircraft at any given time. It also has two designated helipads. There are no radio navigational aids available at the airfield, the runway orientation is 159° – 336° (16–34). Currently, the airfield is only limited to Day operations but no night operations. The ATC is uncontrolled and is operated at the frequency of 122.5 MHz. Recently, Runway lights and PAPI Lights have been installed at the airfield but they are yet not operational and awaiting for an approval from Airport Authority of India (AAI).

== Courses offered at Pinjore Flying Club ==
Haryana Institute of Civil Aviation (HICA) is one of the Directorate General of Civil Aviation (India) approved Flying Training Organizations (FTOs) in the country which provides pilot training to the trainee pilots. The institution conducts flying training and preparation courses leading to the award of Student Pilot License (SPL), Glider Pilot License, Private Pilot Licence (PPL), Commercial Pilot Licence (CPL), Flight Radio Telephony Operator License (FRTOL), Flight Instructor Rating (AFIR/FIR), Instrument Rating (IR) and apprentice internship for all BE/BTech students.

Presently, the Chief Flying Instructor (CFI) of Pinjore Flying Club is Capt. DK Punia, who himself is an alumnus of Haryana Institute of Civil Aviation (HICA). The CPL costs approx. INR 25,00,000 requiring a minimum of 200 hours' flying experience. The Government of Haryana provides training subsidies to natives Haryana, who must apply for it using a Haryana Domicile Certificate. As of May, 2021, over 90 students are currently enrolled at Pinjore Flying Club for the flying training of Commercial Pilot License (CPL) and Private Pilot License (PPL).

Currently, HICA operates two Cessna 172s and two Cessna 152s on this airfield with the following registrations -

Fleet of Aircraft
Aircraft	Registration
C-152	VT-AAE
C-152	VT-ENH
C-172	VT-ACN
C-172	VT-HRB

== Future developments ==
In March, 2018, Finance Minister of Haryana Captain Abhimanyu, while presenting the Government of Haryana 2018–19 budget announced that funds have been allocated for the extension of existing 3,000-feet runway to 5,000 feet and construction of a parking hangar for the spill over aircraft from IGI Delhi airport.

Furthermore, an ATC tower is also expected to be constructed by the year 2023.

[[Category:Aviation in India]]

== See also ==
- List of airports in India
  - Airports Authority of India
  - List of busiest airports in India
  - List of Indian Air Force bases
- List of highways in Haryana
- Pilot training in India
- List of Flying Schools in India
