= Karnal Aerodrome =

Civil Airstrip in Haryana, India used for general operations and pilot training

Karnal Aerodrome and Flying Club
- IATA: none; ICAO: VI40; GPS: VI40

Summary
- Airport type: Public
- Owner: Civil Aviation Department, Haryana
- Operator: Haryana Institute of Civil Aviation
- Location: Karnal, Haryana
- Time zone: IST (UTC+05:30)
- Elevation AMSL: 253.51 m (831.7 ft)
- Coordinates: 29°42′51″N 77°02′15″E
- Website: www.haraviation.gov.in

Map
- Location of the airport in Haryana VI40 (India)

Runways
Direction	Length		Surface
Direction	m	ft	Surface
13/31	917	3,000	Asphalt

Statistics (2017)
- 0

Karnal Aerodrome is operated as a pilot training institute owned and operated by the Haryana Institute of Civil Aviation (HICA) under the guidance of the Civil Aviation Department, Government of Haryana. The flying school covers an area of 104 acres and is situated about 3 km east of Karnal in the state of Haryana, India.

Karnal Flying Club was established in 1967 by the Civil Aviation Department of Haryana and is one of the bases of HICA. The airfield is also used by the Haryana Government as well as VIP charter aircraft and helicopters.

== History ==
In 1948, first airstrip was built in Haryana when Ambala Air Force Station was established. In 1967, Karnal Air Strip was set up. The Karnal Flying Club has been running at this airfield since 1967.

In 2012, The (DGCA) approved the Haryana state government's plans to develop the Airport to operate Domestic Passenger Services in August 2013. Karnal Aerodrome small runway, just 3,000-feet-long and 150-feet-wide, will be extended to 4,500 feet in the first phase and then up to 6,000 feet to accommodate ATR Turboprops and jets. Installation of Runway lighting was taken up by the State Public Works Department after the DGCA gave approval for night flying in July 2012.

== Infrastructure ==
Karnal Aerodrome is spread over an area of 104 acres which includes a runway strip of 3000'×150', an administrative block, one hangar of size 100'×75', a class room, library, a VIP Lounge, a hostel and two residential quarters for the officers and staff. As of 2018, it had two four-seater Cessna-172 R and two two-seater Cessna 152 FA aircraft. The apron area can easily accommodate 10 - 12 small aircraft at any given time. HICA at Karnal also has two flight simulator, one IPT-ATC 710 single engine and another Elite S712 single- & multi-engine Simulator. It also has two designated helipads. There are no radio navigational aids available at the airfield, the runway orientation is 130° – 310° (13–31). Currently, the airfield is only limited to Day operations but no night operations. The ATC is uncontrolled and is operated at the frequency of 122.5 MHz. Installation of runway lighting was taken up by the State Public Works Department after the DGCA gave approval for night flying in July, 2012. The airport has day and DGCA-approved night-landing facilities.

== Courses offered at Karnal Aviation Club ==
Haryana Institute of Civil Aviation (HICA) is one of the Directorate General of Civil Aviation (India) approved Flying Training Organizations (FTOs) in the country which provides pilot training to the trainee pilots. The institution conducts flying training and preparation courses leading to the award of Student Pilot License (SPL), Glider Pilot License, Private Pilot Licence (PPL), Commercial Pilot Licence (CPL), Flight Radio Telephony Operator License (FRTOL), Flight Instructor Rating (AFIR/FIR), Instrument Rating (IR) and apprentice internship for all BE/BTech students.

Currently, the Deputy Chief Flying Instructor of Pinjore Flying Club is Capt. Sunil Gill. The CPL costs approx. INR 25,00,000 and requires a minimum of 200 hours' flying experience. The Government of Haryana provides training subsidies to natives of Haryana, who must apply for them using a Haryana Domicile Certificate. As of January, 2021, over 45 students are currently enrolled at Karnal Aviation Club for the flying training of Commercial Pilot License (CPL) and Private Pilot License (PPL).

Currently, HICA operates two Cessna 172s and two Cessna 152s on this airfield with the following registrations -

Fleet of Aircraft
Aircraft	Registration
C-152	Unknown
C-152	VT-EMZ
C-172	VT-ACW
C-172	VT-HRC

== Future development ==
Captain Abhimanyu, Finance Minister of Haryana, while presenting the Government of Haryana 2018-19 budget in March 2018 announced that the funds have been allocated to extend the existing 3000 feet runway to 6000 feet and parking hangar for the spillover aircraft from IGI Delhi airport will be constructed.

== See also ==
- List of airports in India
  - Airports Authority of India
  - List of busiest airports in India
  - List of Indian Air Force bases
- List of highways in Haryana
- Railway in Haryana
