= Jayanti Devi Temple =

Temple in Punjab, India

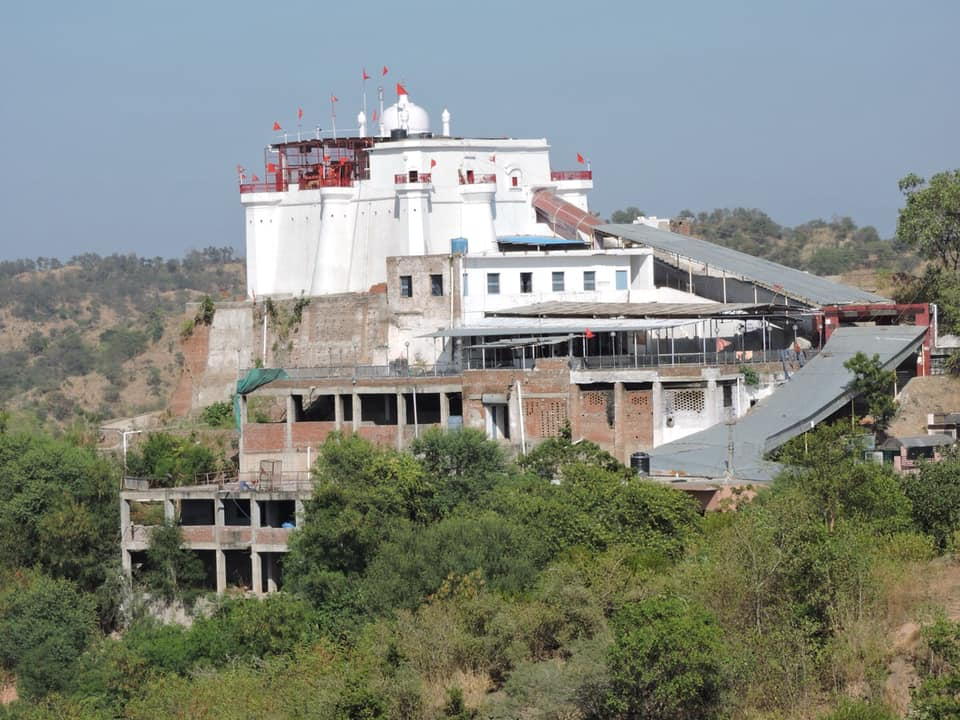
The temple in 2015

Jayanti Devi Temple is a temple of the Hindu goddess of victory Jayanti at Jayantipuri, about 15 km from Chandigarh in the Ropar district of Punjab, India.
