= Sita Mai Temple =

Ancient structure in Haryana, India

The Sītā Māī Temple is an ancient structure situated in the village of Sitamai in the Karnal district of Haryana in North India. It is at a distance of 19 kilometers from Nilokheri and lies on one of the alternative routes available to travel between Karnal and Kaithal. This is perhaps the only temple in the whole of India that is solely dedicated to the Hindu Goddess Sita, the divine consort of Rama of Ayodhya. This temple is under the administration of Ramanandi Bairagis.

== The structure ==
The temple is made of bricks and the striking feature is the elaborate ornamentation, which covers the whole shrine. The pattern of the shrine is formed by deep lines in the individual bricks, which seem to have been made before the bricks were burnt. This means that the forms they were to take must have been separately fixed for each brick when the temple must have been originally designed.

== Significance ==
The temple stands on the spot where the Goddess Mother Earth split open, to allow Sita to repose in her bosom, in answer to Her appeal, in proof of Her sinlessness.

== See also ==
- Mata Kaushalya Temple
