= Hisar Airport =

Airport serving Hisar, NCR, India

Maharaja Agrasen Airport
- IATA: HSS; ICAO: VIHR

Summary
- Airport type: Public
- Owner: Civil Aviation Department, Haryana
- Operator: Haryana Institute of Civil Aviation
- Serves: National Capital Region; Haryana
- Location: Hisar, Haryana, India
- Opened: 31 March 2025; 18 months ago
- Elevation AMSL: 213 m (699 ft)
- Coordinates: 29°10′45″N 075°45′19″E

Map
- Location within Haryana Location within India

Runways
Direction	Length		Surface
Direction	m	ft	Surface
12/30	3,120	10,236	Asphalt

Statistics (April 2025 – March 2026)
- Passengers: 9559 (▲ -%)
- Aircraft movements: 474 (▲ -%)
- Cargo tonnage: —
- Sources: WAC; AAI

Hisar Airport (IATA: HSS, ICAO: VIHR), officially known as Maharaja Agrasen Airport, is an airport at Hisar in the Indian state of Haryana. Spread over an area of 7,200 acres (2,900 ha), it is located 5 km (3.1 mi) northeast of the city center on NH-9, about 165 km (103 mi) northwest of Delhi.

The airport and the surrounding region is undergoing a planned expansion at the cost of ₹52 billion (equivalent to ₹54 billion or US$560 million in 2026) with the addition of Maintenance, repair, and operations facilities, aerospace university, aerospace and defense manufacturing industrial zone, logistics hub, and industrial parks. The first two phases of the project has been completed by 2025 with the third phase projected to be completed by 2030. Along with the Noida International Airport, it is being developed as one of the alternate satellite airports to the Delhi's Indira Gandhi International Airport.

== History ==
=== Initial years ===
Initially constructed in 1965 as an airstrip, the Hisar Airport has been progressively upgraded by successive governments of various political parties with major thrust provided after Bharatiya Janata Party (BJP) came to power in Haryana. In 1965, construction of 194 acres (79 ha) Hisar airfield commenced during the rule of Chief Minister of Punjab, Ram Kishan of INC Party, which was completed in 1967 and it became operational in the same year. In 1948, first airstrip was built in Haryana when Ambala Air Force Station was established.

In 1970–71, a privately managed air service was introduced on Delhi–Patiala–Hisar–Delhi route under the Chief Minister of Haryana, Bansi Lal of INC party, which was terminated after a period of 6 months due to lack of financial viability.

In 1999, Hisar Aviation Club was merged with Haryana Institute of Civil Aviation (HICA). In 2002, the Delhi Flying Club (DFC) shifted all its flying activities and aircraft to Hisar from Safdarjung Airport in Delhi.

On 27 Sept 2018, Hisar became Haryana's first DGCA licensed airport during the BJP rule.

On 26 July 2021, airport was renamed after the Maharaja Agrasen by then Chief Minister of Haryana Manohar Lal Khattar with the view to boost tourism to religious and archaeological sites of Agroha Dham and Agroha Mound respectively.

In 2021, Air taxi services under the UDAN scheme started in January but were discontinued in August due to non-viability. On 12 April 2025, regular scheduled services to Delhi and Ayodhya commenced, and in September 2025 services were also added to Jaipur and Chandigarh.

=== 2016-18 Phase-I upgrade completed ===
2016-18, the Phase-I upgrades of domestic terminal and 3 new hangars, costing ₹50 crore (equivalent to ₹52 crore or US$5.4 million in 2026) were completed:

=== 2018-25 Phase-II upgrade and runway extension completed ===
2018-25, in the Phase-II the runway extension, domestic cargo terminal and MRO hangars were completed including the runway extension from 4,000 feet (1,219 m) to 10,000 feet (3,048 m) to accommodate turboprop aircraft (such as the ATR 72) and jets (such as the Boeing 737 and Airbus A320), MRO hangars, air traffic control (ATC) tower, staff accommodation, fire station, maintenance building, and aircraft support facilities such as refuelling, repairs and overhaul, ground support, and catering etc, were completed in April 2025.

=== 2024-30 Phase-III upgrade in-progress ===
2024-30, Phase-III International airport (2027), aerocity and industrial hub will be completed by 2030 in 3 subphases: In April 2024, Vensa Infrastructure was granted the tender for the construction of the new conch-shaped Hisar International Terminal-1.

  - Phase-III-A - Conch-shaped International airport terminal-1, ₹503 crore (equivalent to ₹519 crore or US$54 million in 2026), 17 April 2027 deadline:
  - Phase-III-B - Aerocity, cargo and logistics integrated hub, ₹1,390 crore (equivalent to ₹14 billion or US$150 million in 2026), 31 March 2028 deadline:
  - Phase-III-C - commercial, industrial and residential integrated hub, ₹1,811 crore (equivalent to ₹19 billion or US$190 million in 2026), 6-10 yrs, 31 March 2030 deadline:

== Airport features ==
The features of DGCA-licensed Hisar airport after the upgrade including runway extension are as follows: Of the 7,200 acres, 4,212 acres is for the airport and the remaining 2988 acres is for the IMC (Industrial Manufacturing Cluster).

Hisar Airport operates a 3-hangar MRO Terminal, a Domestic/Regional Terminal south of Runway-1, complete with 7 bays for aircraft for UDAN flights and facilities for HICA

Hisar Airport also operates a 2-bay Cargo Terminal with cold storage and an integrated logistics hub.

There is an existing international terminal with 10 bays which was completed in Phase II. Spread across 37,970 square metres built-up area, designed to handle 1000 peak hour passengers, equipped with 4 baggage-claim belts and 3 aerobridges with a provision for two more in the future, the terminal is managed by Airports Authority of India.

International Terminal T2 is being planned with no target completion date set.

- Runway
  - 1 existing runway which can handle 12 landing and take-off operations per hour (every 5 minutes) and 1 future runway planned.
  - Runway-1 existing: will have a passenger terminal-1 building in its north with TERI's GRIHA green building certification. .
    - Runway Dimension: 3000m x 60m
    - Runway strip dimension: 3120m x 280m optical landing system (OLS) area
    - Runway orientation: 12/30
    - Runway aircraft suitability: ICAO Code-C aircraft (mid range aircraft)
  - Runway-2 planned: Runway-2, parallel and north of runway-1, will have a passenger terminal-2 building in its south. Passenger buildings of runway 1 and 2 will face each other with a common access road in the middle. Under the access road will be an underground high-speed train station connected to both passenger terminal 1 and 2 via underground tunnel which will also connect to the bus station.
- Air navigation equipment
  - Navigational signal: DVOR, compass rose and wind rose.
  - Instrument Landing System (ILS): 4C (ICAO rating where "4" indicates a runway length of 1,800 meters or more, and the "C" indicates an aircraft wingspan between 24 and 36 meters)
  - Non-precision runway visual range (RVR) Instrument flight rules (IFR) CAT III night landing facilities with <30 m (100 ft) decision height and > 370 m (700 ft) runway visual range (RVR) allowing 24x7 all-weather, day/night low-visibility landing and takeoff even during the night darkness, fog and low visibility which supports approaches from both directions depending on wind, ensuring safe operations.
- Buildings
  - ATC
    - Runway edge lights (REL): Yes
    - Approach Lighting System (ALS): Yes
  - HICA Aviation Academy Building: classroom for trainee pilots and offices for trainers
  - Administration Block
  - Fire brigade Block
  - Security Forces Block
- Airport operations
  - Aircraft operations type: both scheduled and non-scheduled
  - Aircraft operations flight volume: estimated 20 flights per day
  - Passengers Per Year (PPY): estimated 30 lakh (3 million) PAX
  - Passengers Peak Hour (PPH): 500 PAX
  - Employment: 1,000 direct and 5,000 indirect
- Other
  - Aerodrome Reference Code (ARC): 3C
  - Development phases: I, II, and III (A, B, C)
  - Total Land Area (TLA): over 10,000 acres
- IMC (Industrial Manufacturing Cluster): Under the Amritsar–Kolkata Industrial Corridor (AKIC), 6 multi-model logistics IMC are being set up across 6 states, of which Hisar is the largest in area and will be developed in two phases. As part of Delhi–Mumbai Industrial Corridor (DMIC), the 886 acres multi-model IMC is being set up at Nangal Choudhary.
  - Area: 2988 acres,
  - Government Investment: ₹4,680 crore (equivalent to ₹48 billion or US$500 million in 2026) by the Government of Haryana and NICDC, clearances were granted in 2025 by Haryana Government.
  - Total Investment: INR ₹32,000 crore (equivalent to ₹330 billion or US$3.4 billion in 2026) including by the foreign MNCs.
  - Estimated Jobs Creation target: 10,000

== Phase-III: International airport aerocity and industrial hub - completion by 2030 ==
=== Phase-III-A: International Terminal-1, completion by 17 April 2027 ===
Construction commenced on 18 August 2024 with target completion date of 17 April 2027. According to the August 2025 status update, the construction is progressing well for the target completion by 17 April 2027.

=== Phase-III-B: Aviation Training, MRO, Multi-model Transport Logistic Hub, completion by 31 March 2028 ===
==== Aviation Training ====
- GJUST Hisar Aviation College and Aerospace and Defence Manufacturing College, existing:
  During the FY2025-26, budget was allocated for an aviation college at Guru Jambheshwar University of Science and Technology (GJUST), which has been already operating masters and phd level engineering courses in defence manufacturing and aerospace engineering.
- Haryana Institute of Civil Aviation (HICA), existing:
  Run by Haryana govt, has been already operating at Hisar for several decades. As of 2018, it had one four-seater Cessna-172 R and one two-seater Cessna 152 FA aircraft, 2 hangars (85 ft x 72 ft and 96 ft x 70 ft) dedicated to HICA aircraft, 530 sqm administration block, VIP Lounge, 170 sqm hostel for aviation and security staff, one 65 sqm dormitory for aviation and security staff, control tower, 400 sqm training complex with one classroom and one library.
- Hisar Commercial Flight Training Institute (HCFTI), planned:
  In 2019, SpiceJet announced that they will establish a flight training academy at Hisar airport with 10 training aircraft which will train and produce 100 new Commercial Pilot Licence holders (CPL) every year. 10% students, including 4% girls, with Haryana domicile will get 50% waiver on the tuition fee. SpiceJet will place 70% of the 100 pilot trainees within its own organisation.

==== MRO Hub ====
Hisar MRO Hub (HMROH):
3 Hangars for MRO hub were constructed in phase-II. In 2018, an MoU was signed with SpiceJet for development of MRO hub at Hisar. In October 2019, Haryana govt has made offers to Hindustan Aeronautics Limited (HAL), Indian Air Force (IAF) and Indian Army (IA) to commence MRO at Hisar for their helicopters and planes. During the FY2025-26, budget was allocated for the four acres MRO hub. In 2025, bids were invited to lease out the existing MRO hangars, office space and related infrastructure to lease out for 15 years, extendable for another 15 years.

==== Multi-model transport hub ====
Hisar Multi-Modal Logistics Parks (HMMLP), completion by 2028:
Hisar airport is being developed as multi-model transport hub with cargo airport, dry port with double-rack railway sliding, and road transport hub with space for large trucks. MoRTH has approved a Multi-Modal Logistics Parks (MMLP) for Hisar, DPR and subsequent tender were under preparation by HSIIDC in July 2021. MoRTH plan to have 35 MMLPs, each exceeding 100 acres (40.5 hectares), to reduce logistics costs and time, enhance value addition, and stimulate economic growth. Each MMLP will have mechanized warehouses, specialized storage (e.g., cold storage), material handling, inter-modal transfer, and cargo terminals, with multi-modal transport access. These parks offer value-added services including customs clearance, quarantine zones, testing, and warehousing management, alongside provisions for late-stage manufacturing activities like kitting, assembly, grading, and packaging.

- Hisar Air Cargo Hub (HACB), completion 2025:
  During the FY2025-26, budget was allocated for the five-acre warehouse for air cargo hub.
- Railway: DPR, for upgrade of Raipur railway station for passengers and construction of new double-rack railway line from Raipur station to cargo terminal of airport for dry cargo port, was completed in 2023, which is still awaiting approval as of August 2025. In May 2025, direct daily round-trip trains from Hisar were introduced to Chandigarh (starting from Raipur station (Hisar), via Barwala-Uklana-Jind-Kaithal-Kurukshetra-Ambala-Chandigarh) and Gurugram (starting from Satrod station in Hisar, via Hansi-Bhiwani-Rewari). Initially, from 2027 onwards, the rail cargo will be shipped from the Hisar Junctional Railway Station, and the rail sliding at Hisar Cargo Airport will be constructed by 2032. Demand for Vande Bharat Express train to IGI and Jewar Airport remain unfulfilled.
- RRTS: In 2022, Haryana government sent a proposal to the central govt for IGI-Delhi-Hisar RRTS, which still has not receive approval as of August 2025.
- Bus Terminal: Plans have been approved for relocating Hisar's main bus terminal to be co-located with Hisar Airport and Raipur railway station.

=== Phase-III-C: Industrial Manufacturing Cluster, completion by 2030 ===
==== IMC ====
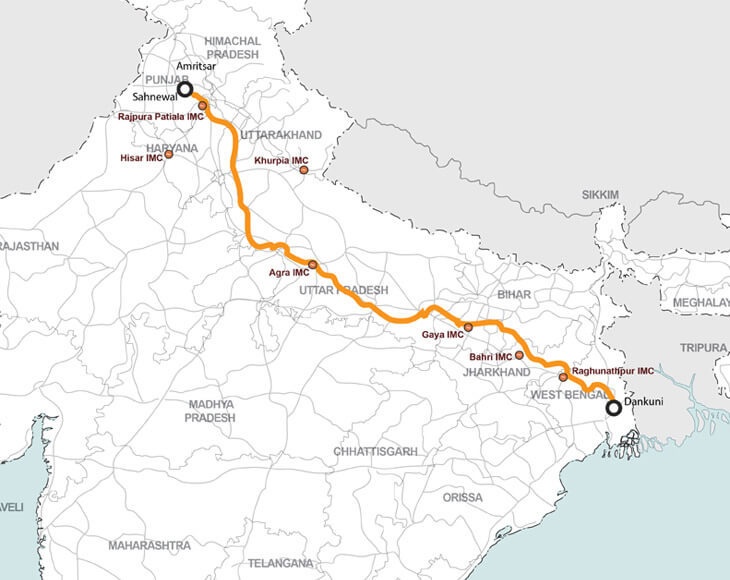
Amritsar Kolkata Industrial Corridor (AKIC) map.

Industrial Manufacturing Cluster, Hisar (IMC Hisar), over 2988 acres on the west and south of the runway with an initial investment of 4,680 crore, will be jointly developed by the Haryana government and the National Industrial Corridor Development Corporation (NICDC) under a 2025 MoU in two phases by 2030, which will generate a total of Rs 30,000 crore investment from private players and generate 10,000 jobs. Under the Amritsar–Kolkata Industrial Corridor, the NICDC is developing 6 IMCs across 7 states, of which IMC Hisar is the largest in area. Hisar IMC will have dedicated modern infrastructure including roads, a water treatment plant (WTP), and a solid waste management plant (STP). A project consultant was appointed in 2024-25 for the preparation of the Hisar IMC Master Plan. The pre-feasibility study for IMC Phase-1 (1605 acres, Rs1800 cr) and Hisar IMC Phase-2 (1543 acres) was completed in July 2021. The Union Government's Cabinet Committee on Economic Affairs (CCEA) granted approval for Hisar IMC on 28 August 2024. State-level Environmental Clearance was granted on 5 February 2024, and the application for Central government Environmental Clearance was filed in December 2024 for developing basic infrastructure at the cost of Rs 121 cr, such as roads, electricity, WTP and STP. The IMC will have several integrated sub-projects, such as an aerocity, special economic zone (SEZ), transport centre, warehouses and logistics park, food park, defence and aerospace manufacturing hub, etc, with 375 plots in phase-1, a maximum building height of 15 stories (45 m) and 33% mandatory green area. The rail siding at Hisar Cargo Terminal on the north side of the runway will be constructed by 2032 in IMC Phase-1, and the final Phase-2 of Hisar IMC will be completed by 2037, by which time it will generate employment for over 60,000 people. For IMT, to be completed in 2,988 acres at the cost of INR4,680 cr in two phases under a 51% HADC (Haryana Aerospace and Defence Corporation) and 49% NICDCT partnership, environmental approval for the 980-acre Phase-1 has been granted in September 2025.

The plan includes the following categories of industries.

- Hisar Aerospace and Defence Manufacturing Hub (HADMH), 75 plots/units, 208 TPA, completion by TBD:
  In October 2019, the discussions for the manufacturing plant for special alloy commenced between the Chief Minister of Haryana, Manohar Lal Khattar and India's Minister of Defence. HADMP (Haryana Aerospace and Defence Manufacturing Policy) envisages US$1 billion investment over five years during fy2026-31, under which Airline Crew Centre will be established at Karnal and HADMH (Hisar Aerospace and Defence Manufacturing Hub) integrated IMT will be developed at Hisar.
- Hisar Food Processing Park (HFP), 20000 TPA, completion by TBD:
  - Mega Food Parks are approved by the Union Ministry of Food Processing Industries (MOFPI) which provides grants up to ₹50 crores for each food park to a consortium of companies. Two mega food parks for Haryana, at Sonipat and Rohtak, have been approved by MOFPI. Haryana government is in the process of planning and preparing DPR for food park at Hisar. See also "Haryana Agri-Business and Food Processing Policy 2018".
  - In 2025 September, Haryana State Warehousing Corporation and Haryana Civil Aviation Department commenced the plans to construct international-standard state-of-the-art coldstorage warehouse and agriproducts cargo hubs specially for the perishable food products in western Haryana, such as kinnow (high yield mandarin hybrid), strawberry, guava, and other products for exports.
- Engineering and Fabrication (EAF), 5500 TPA.
  - Automobile components, 2000 TPA, such as rubber, tyre, auto-parts, ev components, etc.
  - Steel products, 3500 TPA, such as light engineering and fabrication units.
- Hisar Medical Hub: on 500 acres.
  - Hisar Medicity, completion by TBD: for medical tourism.
  - Medical and Meditech Manufacturing Hub, such as bulk drugs, surgical equipments, etc:
- Hisar Apparel Park, 750 TPA: such as hosiery and readymade garment manufacturing. In 2019, Hisar had 40 micro units manufacturing apparels with total annual turnover of Rs 8 crore, they along with Haryana Department of Industries came together to form a SPV (special purpose vehicle) and commissioned a feasibility study Ernst & Young for setting up a CFC (Common Facilitation Center) for cutting, design an lamination of apparels with 90% government grant.
- Hisar Logistic Park, 70 acres: will include facilities like export processing zone (EPZ), warehouses, cold storages, commercial offices for logistics companies, parking for 1000 trucks, vehicle testing, fuel stations, weigh bridge, primary health centre, food outlets, housing and hotel, etc.
- Other: will include IT Park, Theme Park, educational institutions, community hall, etc.

==== Aerocity ====
Hisar Aerocity, 67 acres for commercial and residential such as hotels (1 five-star hotel and 1 three-star hotel in IMC Phase-1), planned:
Commercial and residential zone is planned at location to the west and southwest of the runway-1, it includes hotels, office space, malls, retail, trading, wide range of commercial and professional services including third party cargo and passenger services.

== Airlines and destinations ==
Airlines	Destinations
Alliance Air	Ayodhya, Chandigarh, Delhi, Jaipur

== Statistics ==
Operations and statistics
Year	Passengers	Flights
2019-20	49	14
2020-21	220	210
2021-22	271	231
2022-23	128	32
2023-24	35	12
2024-25	0	0
2025-26	9559	474

== Present status ==
- 2025 Aug: The phase-I (domestic terminal) and phase-II (expanded runway) completed, with Alliance Air operating direct flights to several cities. Phase-III-A International Terminal construction was underway with target construction completion date of 17 April 2027.
- 2026 Apr: Phase-III-A International Terminal construction was 35% complete and on-track to meet the originally planned target completion date of 17 April 2027.
- 2026 Jun: Rs 707 crore EPC (Engineering, Procurement and Construction) tender for design and construction of the AKIC (Amritsar-Kolkata Industrial Corridor)'s Hisar-IMC (Integrated Manufacturing Cluster)'s trunk infrastructure was issued. It includes roads, water supply, sewerage, stormwater drainage, etc to be constructed within 30 months of tender award. Additionally, DHBVN will build a 220-kV electric substation with five 33-kV substations for the project. Hisar IMC is among the 12 IMC smart cities of AKIC.

== See also ==
- List of airports in India
  - Airports Authority of India
  - List of busiest airports in India
  - List of Indian Air Force bases
- List of highways in Haryana
- Railway in Haryana
