= Narnaul Airport =

Airport of Haryana, India

Narnaul Airport nārnaul vimāntal
- IATA: none; ICAO: VINL; GPS: VINL

Summary
- Airport type: Public
- Owner: Civil Aviation Department, Haryana
- Operator: Airport Authority of India
- Serves: Narnaul, Haryana
- Location: Bachhod village, Narnaul
- Built: Civil Airport
- Time zone: IST (UTC+05:30)
- Elevation AMSL: 313 m (1,027 ft)
- Coordinates: 28°04′30″N 076°12′04″E
- Website: www.haraviation.gov.in

Map
- Location of the airport in Haryana VINL (India)

Runways
Direction	Length		Surface
Direction	m	ft	Surface
09/27	1,084	2,950	Asphalt

Statistics (2017)
- Hub for the number of airlines: 0
- Number of scheduled airlines flying in: 0
- Number of scheduled weekly flights: 0
- Number of scheduled flight passengers: 0
- Number of runways: 1
- Source: Airports Authority of India, Great Circle Mapper

Narnaul Airport (Hindi: nārnaul vimāntal), also Bachhod Airstrip, is an airstrip adjacent to Bhilwara village 10 km east of Narnaul city in the Indian state of Haryana. The airstrip is used mainly by Rajiv Gandhi National Centre for Aero Sports, which was inaugurated in 2010. The airstrip is owned by the Civil Aviation Department of Haryana government. Its ICAO code is VINL as listed in India AIP May 2023.

== History ==
In 1948, first airstrip was built in Haryana when Ambala Air Force Station was established. Narnaul was established later in.

== Infrastructure ==
Narnaul Airport has one hangar as well as one admin block cum VIP lounge. Its runway in 09/27 direction has runway dimension of 914 by 23 metres (2,999 ft × 75 ft). Airports Authority of India lists its runway strip dimension as 1058 x 23 m including leading space at front and back of runway. The airport has an admin-cum-VIP lounge and one hangar, but does not have night landing facility. It does not have any control tower and has no scheduled flights.

The Airports Authority of India lists its ICAO code as VI20 which is wrong because VI20 code is for Bhilwara airstrip.

== Flight Training ==
Since 2021, FSTC Flying School Pvt Ltd provides training for Private Pilot License (PPL), Commercial Pilot License (CPL), and Instrument Ratings (IR) for both single-engine and multi-engine aircraft with a modern fleet of Cessna 172S, Piper PA-28-181 Archer III, and Tecnam P2008.

== Rajiv Gandhi National Centre for Aero Sports ==
On 31 January 2010, the Rajiv Gandhi National Centre for Aero Sports was inaugurated at Narnaul Airport. 51 acres were acquired for this purpose. Chief Minister Bhupinder Singh Hooda and Aero Club of India President Satish Sharma were present at the inauguration ceremony. The centre was set up by Aero Club of India and the Department of Civil Aviation, Haryana. It is the first ever modern state-of-the-art aero sports centre in India to provide training in comprehensive range of various aero sports, including para-jumping (simulated parachute jump from a tower), parasailing, hot air ballooning, gliding, power flying, sky diving, aero modelling and micro light flying, with the purpose of introducing the state's youth to aviation and providing the general population a cheap opportunity to experience aero sports.

=== Sky diving ===
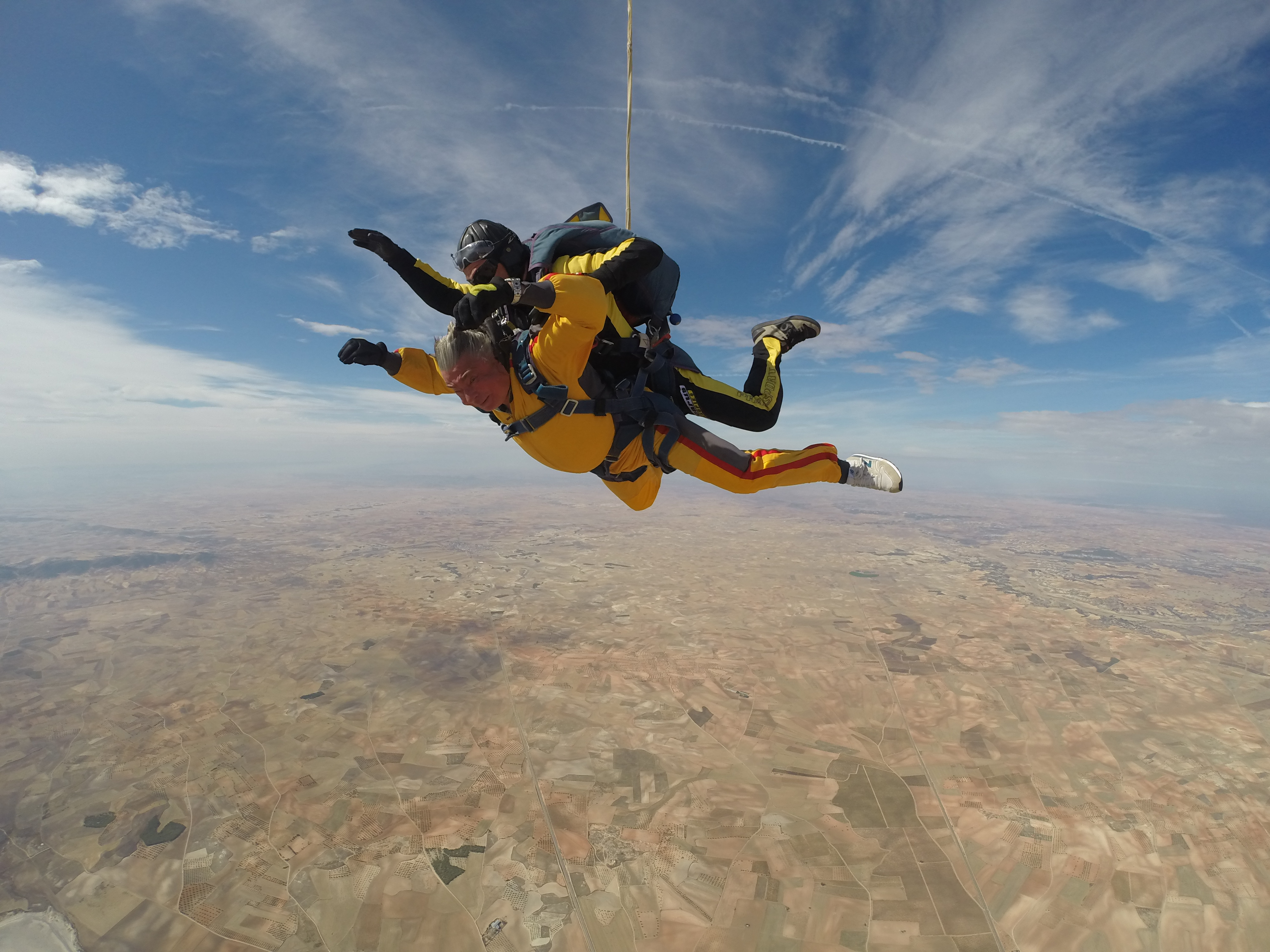
Tandem skydiving

Haryana govt has authorized the Pioneer Flying Academy to offer tandem skydiving and static line jumps from a Cessna 172 aircraft. In 2023, 1200 recreational skydives were performed at Narnaul airport.

== Future development ==
The finance minister of Haryana, while presenting the Government of Haryana 2018-19 budget in March 2018 announced that the funds have been allocated to extend the existing 3000 feet runway to 5000 feet and parking hangar for the spillover aircraft from IGI Delhi airport will be constructed.

As of January 2019, construction of hangar is underway. Night landing facilities and hangar will also be built as airlines have approached the Haryana government to park their "Non-scheduled Air Operations" (NSOP) spillover aircarafts from the congested IGI airport at Delhi to Bhiwani and Narnaul airport. Consequently, all five existing government airports in Haryana will be developed to have runway of at least 5000 feet, night landing and parking hangars.

== See also ==
- List of airports in India
  - Airports Authority of India
  - List of busiest airports in India
  - List of Indian Air Force bases
- List of highways in Haryana
- Railway in Haryana
