= Haryana Institute of Civil Aviation =

Coordinates: 30°44′N 76°47′E

The Haryana Institute of Civil Aviation (HICA) is a Government of Haryana undertaking established in 1966 that operates four flying clubs in the state of Haryana, India to provide pilot training.

== Flying clubs ==
The Haryana Institute of Civil Aviation operates the following flying clubs providing flight training for aspiring pilots.

- Hisar Aviation Club at Hisar Airport: As of July 2016, Hisar based Aviation flying club had two aircraft, a four-seater Cessna 172 built in 2008 and an old two-seater Cessna 152 built in 1986. The institute has 15 approved seats to impart training for the commercial pilot licence (CPL) and private pilot licence (PPL). The CPL requires a minimum of 200 hours flying experience. In September 2019, Spice Jet also started a flight training academy at Hisar airport with 10 training aircraft to train 100 pilots every year. Four girls with state domicile and 10% students with Haryana domicile will get 50% waiver on tuition fee, Spice Jet will place 70% of the 100 pilot trainees within its own organisation.
- Pinjore Aviation Club at Kalka Airport
- Karnal Flying Club at Karnal Airport
- Narnaul Airport, Narnaul flying club at Narnaul Airport

== Courses offered ==
The HICA offers flying training and preparation courses to pilots for the following Directorate General of Civil Aviation licenses':

- Student pilot licence
- Private pilot licence
- Commercial pilot licence
- Glider pilot licence

The Government of Haryana provides subsidies for the above to natives of the state of Haryana who must apply for it using a Haryana Domicile Certificate.

== See also ==
- List of pilot training institutes in India
- List of schools in Hisar
- List of universities and colleges in Hisar
- List of institutions of higher education in Haryana
