= Glider pilot license =

Type of pilot license

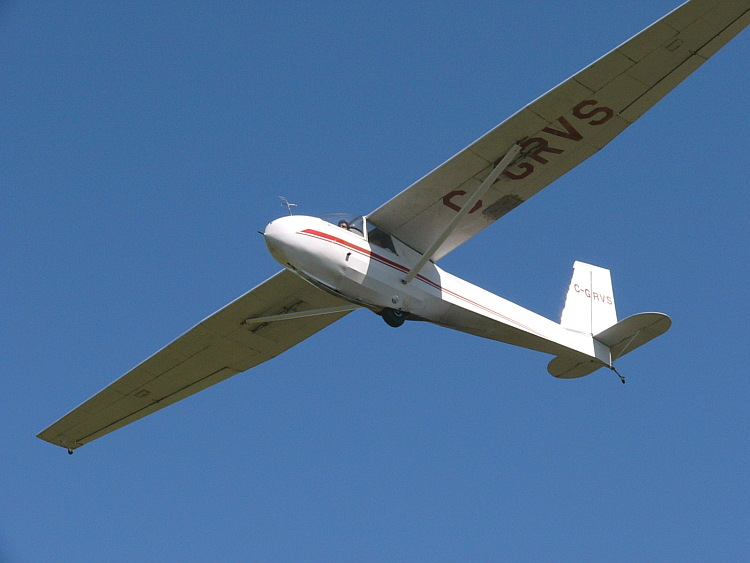
The Schweizer SGS 2-33 glider is commonly used for glider pilot training in North America

In most countries one is required to obtain a glider pilot license (GPL) or certificate before acting as pilot of a glider. The requirements vary from country to country.

In many countries, licensing or certification is similar for gliders and powered aircraft. Training must be undertaken from a certified instructor, and a license or certificate is then issued by the government, limited to gliders only. The exception is when a pilot is flying under Ultralight (Ultralite) glider rules within the United States. The aviation knowledge and skill requirements for a glider are usually similar to those for a powered aircraft, taking into account the different requirements of the aircraft categories.

Most countries also require medical certificates for pilots, although in some countries "self-certification", i.e., a legal statement that one is fit to fly, is allowed for gliders. The United States does not require a medical certificate to operate a glider with a U.S. airman certificate. Canada also permits glider pilot license holders to self-certify, but requires regular medical examinations for gliding instructors.

In some countries, glider instruction and licensing are regulated by a national non-governmental organisation representing the gliding community. This is true in the Netherlands, Australia, New Zealand and the United Kingdom. New Zealand also issues a government license to pilots who fly for fees and for those who wish their qualifications to be accepted more readily overseas.

Countries vary in their acceptance of pilot licenses from other countries to fly aircraft registered in the home country. Many permit pilots to fly on their home licenses for short periods, others insist on conversion to their license. Generally, a pilot may fly an aircraft registered in their home country with their home country's license or certificate, in any other country, subject to international conventions.

== United Kingdom ==
The minimum age for a solo glider flight in the UK is 14. A driving licence is adequate evidence of medical fitness for solo flight, and pilots under the age of 25 may self-certify. Failing this a medical certificate is required from the pilot's own doctor, to the same standard as a provisional driving licence, unless the pilot has a higher certificate such as the EASA Class 2 medical required for a Private Pilot Licence (PPL). Gliding in the UK is self-regulated by the British Gliding Association (BGA) and by its member clubs. Training is based on standards defined by the BGA and is conducted by instructors who have been trained on its courses. Further practical training is required after solo, plus a multiple choice test which is very similar to the PPL theory exam, before a pilot is given an endorsement to fly cross-country. Most flights do not require radio contact with air traffic control units, but some pilots obtain a radio operator's licence should that eventuality arise.

As of 2023, the BGA issues two major gliding qualifications, the Gliding Certificate (a.k.a. Glider Pilot Certificate), and the Glider Pilot Licence. Both are being phased out in favour of an ICAO-compliant Sailplane Pilot Licence (SPL), which can be used abroad. The SPL is specified in UK Part-SFCL. It will still be issued by the BGA, under Delegated Authority from the CAA. The Gliding Certificate can be converted to an SPL, but the Glider Pilot Licence cannot.

The Gliding Certificate is endorsed for each requirement met, and also shows sporting achievements for the FAI's gliding badges, plus the UK's own 100 km and 750 km Diplomas.

== EASA ==
Throughout Europe the European Aviation Safety Agency (EASA) is the rulemaking body responsible for pilot licensing. For glider pilots there are two options:

- The Light Aircraft Pilot Licence (Sailplanes) (LAPL(S)) is a sub-ICAO licence, meaning it does not have to be accepted in non-EASA countries.
- The Sailplane Pilot Licence (SPL) is an ICAO-recognised licence, valid worldwide.

In some EASA member states (notably the UK), a lower medical standard applies to the LAPL(S), such that a pilot may choose the LAPL medical instead of a Class 2 medical. During the transition period, UK pilots may self-declare medical fitness, being restricted to UK-registered EASA aircraft.

Crucially, a pilot exercising the rights of a SPL may receive remuneration but the holder of a LAPL(S) may not.

== See also ==
- Pilot licensing and certification
