= Rail transport in Haryana =

Train service in the northern Indian state

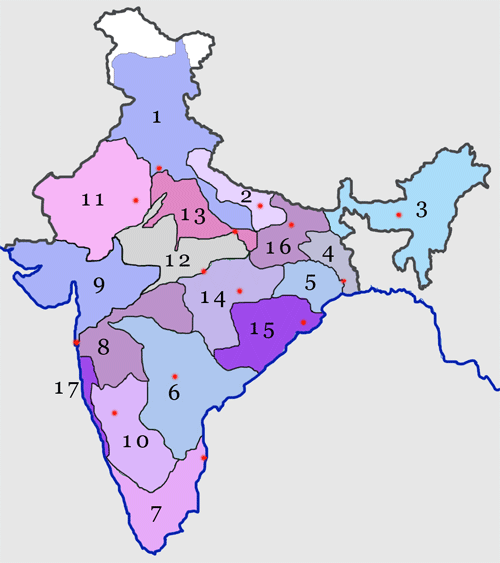
- Indian Railways zones in Haryana: 1=Northern Railway (Ambala-Yamunanagar-Kalka), 11=North Western Railway (Loharu-Hisar-Fatehabad-Sirsa), and 13=North Central Railway (Delhi and the rest of Haryana)

Overview
- Headquarters: New Delhi railway station
- Dates of operation: 1952–present

Technical
- Track gauge: Mixed

Other
- Website: www.nr.indianrailways.gov.in

Rail transport in the state of Haryana, India, is conducted by five rail divisions in three zones: the North Western Railway zone (the Bikaner and Jaipur railway divisions), Northern Railway zone (the Delhi and Ambala railway divisions), and North Central Railway zone (the Agra railway division). The Diamond Quadrilateral high-speed rail network, Eastern Dedicated Freight Corridor, and Western Dedicated Freight Corridor pass through Haryana.

== History ==
=== 19th century ===
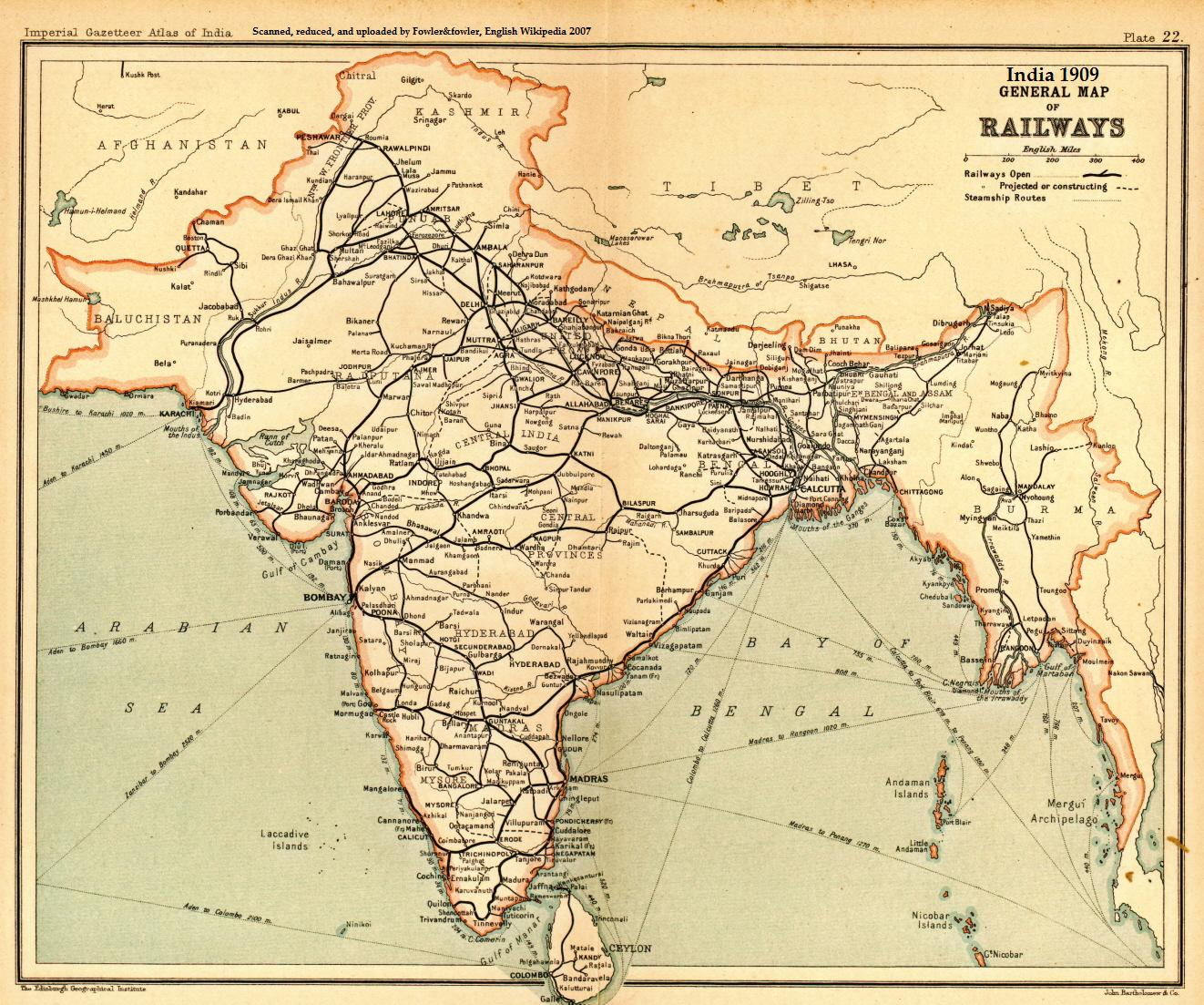
The Indian railway network in 1909

On 3 March 3, 1859, the Allahabad-Kanpur line (North India's first passenger railway line) opened; it is now part of the Northern Railway zone. Tracks passing through Haryana were completed in 1864, when a broad gauge track from Calcutta to Delhi was laid. In 1866, trains started running on the East Indian Railway Company's Howrah-Delhi line. In 1870, the Scinde, Punjab & Delhi Railway completed its 483-kilometre (300 mi) long Amritsar-Ambala-Jagadhri-Saharanpur-Ghaziabad line connecting Multan (in present-day Pakistan) with Delhi. The Sarai Rohilla railway station was built in 1872, when the metre gauge railway line from Delhi to Jaipur and Ajmer was laid. It was a small station just outside Delhi, which was then a walled city. All metre-gauge trains between Delhi and Rewari, Punjab, Rajasthan and Gujarat passed through Sarai Rohilla. Metre-gauge track from Delhi to Rewari and Ajmer was laid in 1873 by the Rajputana State Railway.

In 1884, the Rajputana-Malwa Railway extended the 1,000 mm (3 ft 3 3/8 in)-wide (metre-gauge) Delhi-Rewari section of its Delhi–Fazilka line to Bathinda. It became the Delhi-Bathinda-Samasatta line, and was opened by the Southern Punjab Railway Company in 1897. The line passed through the Muktasar and Fazilka tehsils and connected Samma Satta (in present-day Pakistan) directly to Karachi. The Bathinda-Rewari metre-gauge line was converted to 1,676 mm (5 ft 6 in)-wide broad gauge in 1994.

The Delhi-Panipat-Ambala-Kalka line was opened in 1891. The 610 mm (2 ft)-wide narrow gauge Kalka-Shimla Railway, built by the Delhi-Panipat-Ambala-Kalka Railway Company, opened in 1903. In 1905, the line became 762 mm (2 ft 6 in)-wide narrow gauge.

=== 20th century ===
In 1900, the Jodhpur–Bikaner line was merged with the Jodhpur-Hyderabad Railway. Part of this railway is in present-day Pakistan, with connections to Hyderabad in Sindh. In 1901–1902, the line was extended to Bathinda to connect it with the metre-gauge section of the Bombay, Baroda and Central India Railway and the metre gauge of the North Western Railway Delhi–Fazilka line via Hanumangarh. On the Indian border, it was later converted to broad gauge. Mahatma Gandhi was arrested at the Palwal station on his way to Punjab for an April 1919 non-cooperation movement meeting, and a six-foot commemorative statue of Gandhi was installed in October 2013.

In 1926, the New Delhi railway station opened to serve the new imperial capital. Before the capital was founded in 1911, the Old Delhi Railway Station served the city. The Agra-Delhi railway line ran through Lutyens' Delhi, known for its India Gate war memorial and the Rajpath, but was moved to the Yamuna river and opened in 1924 to make way for the new capital. The Minto (Shivaji) and Hardinge (Tilak) rail bridges were built for the rerouting.

The East Indian Railway Company, who oversaw railways in the region, sanctioned the construction of a single-story building with one platform between Ajmeri Gate and Paharganj in 1926; this was later known as New Delhi railway station. Government plans to have the station built inside the Central Park of Connaught Place were rejected by the rail company as impractical.

Work continued after the station opened, and the New Delhi Capital works project to construct 4.79 miles (7.71 km) of new lines was completed in 1927 and 1928. The viceroy and royal retinue entered the city through the new station during the 1931 New Delhi inauguration. New structures were added to the station, and the original building became the parcel office.

On 5 November 1951, the Jodhpur–Bikaner line was merged with the Western Railway. Construction began to convert its metre gauge to 1,676 mm (5 ft 6 in) broad gauge and build a link to Phulera, and it was the Jodhpur–Merta City–Bikaner–Bathinda line by 2008. On April 14, 1952, the Northern Railway zone was created with the merger of the Jodhpur State, Bikaner State and Eastern Punjab Railways and three East Indian Railway divisions northwest of Mughalsarai, Uttar Pradesh.

In 1976–77, the Ghaziabad-Nizamuddin-New Delhi-Delhi line was electrified. On 1 July 1987, the Ambala railway division was created when 639 km of tracks were transferred from the Delhi Division and 348 km were transferred from the Firozpur Division; it became operational on 15 August 1988. Sixty-two percent of the division is in Punjab, with the rest in Haryana, Himachal Pradesh, Uttar Pradesh, Rajasthan and Chandigarh. The division has 141 stations, including the World Heritage Site Kalka Shimla Railway.

Electrification continued during the 1990s, and the Sabjimandi-Karnal sector was electrified between 1992 and 1995. The Ambala-Chandigarh sector was electrified in 1998 and 1999 and was followed by Chandigarh-Kalka, electrified in 1999 and 2000.

Before December 1994, the Delhi-Rewari line had double metre-gauge tracks; that year, one track was converted to broad gauge as part of the Ajmer-Delhi line conversion. Both tracks between the Sarai Rohilla and Delhi railway stations were converted to broad gauge within a few years, and metre-gauge trains stopped operating from the Delhi station.

=== 21st century ===
The North Western Railway zone was created on 1 October 2002, followed by the North Central Railway zone on 1 April 2003. The second metre-gauge track from Sarai Rohilla to Rewari was converted to broad gauge by September 2006, and metre-gauge trains stopped operating between the stations; the converted track opened for public use in October 2007. Broad-gauge conversions were adjusted for the Bikaner–Rewari line between 2008 and 2011, and for the metre-gauge Hisar-Sadulpur section in 2009.

A 104-km survey for the Panipat–Meerut line was part of the 2010–11 rail budget. The project, costing ₹948 crore, was approved in the 2017-18 budget. New lines were built and opened in 2013. The Chandigarh–Sahnewal line (also known as the Ludhiana-Chandigarh rail link) was inaugurated, the broad-gauge, electrified Rewari–Rohtak line was built, and the foundation stone for the shifting of a section of the Rohtak-Gohana-Panipat line was laid.

A re-survey of the Yamunanagar–Chandigarh line, costing ₹25 crore, was part of the 2016–17 rail budget. The total cost of the project was ₹875 crore. In the 2017-18 rail budget, Indian Railways approved the Panipat-Jind line and Panipat-Rohtak line electrification plans costing ₹980 core. A Panipat-Shamli-Baghpat-Meerut line was approved for ₹2,200 crore.

By December 2017, 6,095 GPS-enabled Fog Pilot Assistance System railway-signaling devices had been installed in the Northern, North Central, North Eastern and North Western Railway zones. The devices ended the practice of putting firecrackers on train tracks to alert train drivers to reduce speed; the location of signals, level-crossing gates and other such markers is known in advance. The Rewari Railway Heritage Museum, built in 1893, is India's only surviving steam locomotive shed.

== Network ==
Haryana Space Applications Centre, Hisar (HARSAC) has produced the state's railway map, and its lines are included in the rail "pink book".

=== Divisions and workshops ===
Haryana has five divisions in three rail zones, and each division has its own workshops.

- North Western Railway zone
  - The Bikaner railway division manages the network in western and southern Haryana, covering the Bhatinda-Dabwali-Hanumangarh, Rewari-Bhiwani-Hisar-Bathinda, Hisar-Sadulpur and Rewari-Kanina-Loharu-Sadulpur lines. A-category stations are Bhiwani and Hisar; Sirsa is a B-category station; D-category stations are Ellenabad, Mandi Dabwali, Bhattu, Mandi Adampur, Hansi, Loharu, Charkhi Dadri, Kanina, Mahendragagh and Kosli, and Satrod is an E-category station. There are sidings at Sirsa for FCI, and at Jharli for the thermal power plant. Railway health units are at Sirsa and Hisar (one doctor at each), and the Railway Divisional Hospital is at Lalgarh (on the outskirts of Bikaner).
  - The Jaipur railway division manages the network in south-west Haryana, covering the Rewari-Reengas-Jaipur, Delhi-Alwar-Jaipur and Loharu-Sikar lines.
- Northern Railway zone
  - The Delhi railway division manages the network in north, east, and central Haryana, covering the Delhi-Panipat-Ambala, Delhi-Rohtak-Tohana, Rewari–Rohtak, Jind-Sonepat and Delhi-Rewari lines.
  - The Ambala railway division manages a small part of the network in north-east Haryana, covering the Ambala-Yamunanagar and Ambala-Kurukshetra lines and the UNESCO World Heritage Site Kalka–Shimla Railway. There are two workshops in the division: Carriage & Wagon Workshop, Jagadhari and Carriage & Wagon Workshop, Kalka, for narrow gauge.
- North Central Railway zone
  - The Agra railway division manages the Palwal-Mathura line in south-east Haryana.

=== Lines ===
- North Western Railway zone
  - Bikaner railway division
    - Bhatinda-Dabwali-Hanumangarh line
    - Rewari-Bhiwani-Hisar-Bathinda and Hisar-Sadulpur lines
    - Rewari-Kanina-Loharu-Sadulpur line
    - Bhiwani-Rohtak line
    - Hisar-Hansi-Rohtak line (under construction)
    - Hisar-Agroha line (surveyed and approved)
    - Hisar-Jind line (surveyed)
    - Hansi-Narnaund-Jind line (being surveyed)
  - Jaipur railway division
    - Rewari-Reengas-Jaipur line
    - Delhi-Alwar-Jaipur line
    - Loharu-Sikar line
- Northern Railway zone
  - Ambala railway division
    - Ambala-Yamunanagar line
    - Ambala-Kurukshetra line
    - Kalka–Shimla Railway
    - Chandigarh-Adi Badri-Paonta Sahib line (surveyed in 2012)
    - Yamunanagar-Chandigarh line (new line, being resurveyed)
  - Delhi railway division
    - Delhi-Panipat-Ambala line
    - Delhi-Rohtak-Jind- Narwana-Tohana- Jakhal line
    - Narwana-Kaithal-Kurukshetra line
    - Rewari–Rohtak line
    - Jind-Sonepat line (via Gohana)
    - Jind-Panipat line (via Safidon)
    - Rohtak-Panipat line (via Gohana, being elevated)
    - Delhi-Rewari line
    - Panipat-Meerut line (surveyed)
- North Central Railway zone
  - Agra railway division
    - Palwal-Mathura line

=== Projects ===
Undertaken by Indian Railways and Rail Infrastructure Development Company (Haryana) (H-RIDE, also known as the Haryana Rail Infrastructure Development Corporation).

- Announced in 2018 (feasibility studies):

- Karnal-Yamunanagar line, with additional funding in the 2019-20 rail budget
- Kaithal-Karnal- Meerut line
- Yamunanagar-Chandigarh via Naraingarh and Sadhaura: A 91-km link sent to the planning commission in 2013. An MoU was signed in 2015, and it was included in the 2018 pink book. Additional funding was allocated in the 2019-20 union railway budget. As of Feb 2025, it will cost Rs 901 cr, detailed study is complete, work will commence soon.

- Mohali-Rajpura line, 24 km long Rs 406 cr line will provide additional connectivity between Chandigarh and Ambala. As of Feb 2025, the detailed study is about to be completed, work will begin soon.

- Delhi-Sohna-Nuh-Ferozpur Zhirka-Alwar line: A 104-km link sent to the planning commission in 2013. An MoU was signed in 2015, and it was included in the 2018 pink book. Additional funding was allocated in the 2019-20 union railway budget.
- Kaithal-Patiala line: A survey, announced in the 2016-17 budget, was completed in January 2019. In January 2019, it was awaiting Railway Board approval for inclusion in the pink book.
- Bhiwani-Loharu line via Kairu-Jui: An MoU was signed in 2015, and H-RIDE will build the section and connect it to the Loharu-Pilani-Jhunjhunu link. Additional funding was allocated in the 2019-20 union railway budget. The Jaipur-Reengas-Churu line was surveyed in 2015-2016.
- Narwana-Hisar line (65 km): A survey began in 2018 of the shortest route via Narnaund.

- Ukalana-Narwana line (29 km): Previously-announced connection to Kurukshetra and Chandigarh
- Hansi-Jind line (45 km) via Narnaund: A previously-announced connection, additional funding was allocated for the Jind-Hisar line in the 2019-20 union railway budget.
- Farrukhnagar-Jhajjar-Charkhi Dadri line (72 km): Surveyed in 2010, the next-stage survey began in 2018. Additional funding was allocated in the 2019-20 union railway budget.
- Jhajjar-Palwal line (95 km): Includes the 30-km Jhajjar-Farukh Nagar link and the 60-km Patli-Sohna-Manesar-Asaoti(Palwal) link along the Western Peripheral Expressway, it was approved by the Haryana government in December 2018 and approval from the railway board was expected shortly.
- Surveys for the Rajgarh-Taranagar-Sardarshar and Sardarshar-Bhadra-Sirsa lines were completed in 2015-16. km
- Hisar Airport line: As of December 2018, the Hisar-Jakhal line would be extended to Hisar Airport as an integrated transport hub.
- Chandigarh(Kalka)-Baddi line (23.33 km): Included in the 2018 NR pink book, a preliminary engineering-cum-traffic survey was done in 2010. In November 2017, Haryana announced that a ₹175 crore, 22-hectare land acquisition was in progress. In December 2024, Chandigarh-Baddi will cost ₹1,540 crore, railway has released its share of ₹217.75 crore but delay is being caused as the Himachal state govt is yet to release its share of ₹145.75 to the railway. In Dec 2024, 67% budget has been spent, and work will be completed by 31 June 2026. In Feb 2025, work was 27% complete. The DPR for 25 km Baddi-Ghanauli extension was ready in 2026 where it will connect to the Bhanupli–Leh line.

- Manesar railway sliding project for Maruti Udyog as part of HORC

- Announced c. February 2015:

- Karnal-Yamuna Nagar line
- Panipat-Meerut line (104 km): Surveyed and included in the 2018 NR pink book.
- Kaithal-Karnal line
- Jakhal-Ratia-Fatehabad line
- Fatehabad-Mansa-Bhatinda line
- Hisar-Sirsa via Agroha Fatehabad (93 km) link: Sent to the planning commission in 2013. Survey completed and included in the 2018 pink book; ₹40 lakh was allocated in the 2019-20 union railway budget for a final, detailed survey.
- Rewari-Palwal (via Bhiwadi) line Survey completed as part of the NCR Regional Orbital Rail Corridor (RORC).
- Alwar-Narnaul-Mahendragarh-Charkhi Dadri line: Announced in 2014, but not yet surveyed.

- Previously surveyed:

- Kaithal-Pundri-Karnal line (92 km): Surveyed in 2010
- Patiala-Samana-Jakhal-Narwana line (93 km): Surveyed in 2010
- Bahadurgarh-Jhajjar line (40 km): Surveyed in 2010
- Yamunanagar-Kurukshetra-Patiala line (174 km): Surveyed in 2010
- Rajgarh-Taranagar-Sardarshar line: Survey completed in 2015-16, with the 100-km Sardarshar-Bhadra-Sirsa line. Sardarshar-Loonkaransar was surveyed in 2014.

==== Under consideration ====
- Bilaspur-Paonta Sahib line, to connect the proposed Chandigan-Yamunanagr line to Paonta Sahib and the Chota Char Dham Railway
- Jhumpa-Bhiwani line
- Narnaul-Charki Dadri-Meham line
- Bhadra-Adampur-Fatehabad-Budhlada line, to connect with the surveyed Sardarshahar-Sirsa line
- Hisar-Kanwari-Tosham-Kairu-Jui-Mahendragarh line
- Charkhi Dadri-Jhumpa Khurd line
- Charkhi Dadri-Loharu line
- Yamunanagar-Indri-Karnal line
- Fatehabad-Uklana line, to connect with the proposed Uklana-Narwana line
- Jind-Barwala-Agroha-Adampur line
- Karnal-Jind-Hansi-Kanwari-Tosham-Jhumpa line: The Kaithal-Pundri-Karnal line was surveyed in 2010.
- Karnal-Deoband and Mujaffarnagar-Deoband-Roorkee lines: Under construction to connect Haryana to Haridwar
- Mujaffarnagar-Shamli-Panipat and Mujaffarnagar-Deoband-Roorkee lines: Under construction to connect Haryana to Haridwar
- Meerut-Sonipat line
- Hisar-Anupgarh line via Balsamand-Bhadra-Nohar-Ryanwali-Anupgarh
- Bawanikhera-Mahajan line via Gohana-Meham-Bawanikhera-Kanwari-Tosham-Siwani-Sahwa-Pallu-Mahajan-Anupgarh
- Mandkola-Dhaulpur line via Mandkola-Hathin-Uttawar-Punhana-Barsana-Govardhan-Deeg-Bharatpur-Dhaulpur route from where it connects to existing Delhi-Dhaulpur-Gwalior-Nagpur route. Also provides alternate route to Agra and Mathura.

==== Under construction ====
- Hisar-Hansi-Rohtak line: Rohtak-Meham under construction, with completion scheduled for June 2019; Hansi-Hisar tenders underway in November 2017.
- Palwal-Firozepure Jhirka-Alwar line, via Palwal-Mandkola-Nuh-Bhadas-Firozepure Jhirka-Ootwar-Alwar

==== NCR projects ====
- NCR Regional Orbital Rail Corridor (RORC)

- Panipat-Rohtak line via Panipat-Gohana-Rohtak
- Rohtak-Rewari line via Rohtak-Jhajjar-Rewari
- Rewari-Khurja line via Rewari-Bhiwadi-Nuh-Palwal-Khurja: Survey completed
- Khurja-Meerut line via Khurja-Bulandshahr-Hapur-Meerut
- Meerut-Panipat line: Surveyed; the project will cost ₹2,200 crore.

- NCR Inner Regional Orbital Rail Corridor (IRORC)

- Sonepat-Bahadurgrah-Jhajjar line
- Jhajjar-Farukh Nagar-Gurgaon line
- Gurgaon-Faridabad line
- Faridabad-Dadri line
- Dadri-Ghaziabad line: Also part of the RRTS corridor
- Ghaziabad-Kundali line via Baghpat
- Hisar
- Bhopal-Beora-Ramganj-Jhalawar link: Tenders were issued in 2014.

==== Himachal Pradesh ====
- Nangal Dam-Talwara line (83.74 km): Included in the 2018 pink book. In December 2025, INR 2568 crore have been spent, Talwara-Mukerian section is complete and operational since January 2019, and 52 km long Punab section (Talwara-Una-Daulatpur-Kartoli) is underway.
- Banopli-Bilaspur-Beri line (63.1 km): Included in the 2018 pink book.
- Chadigarh(Kalka)-Baddi line (33.23 km): Included in the 2018 pink book.
- Una-Hamirpur line (50 km): Included in the 2018 pink book.

==== Punjab ====
New links near the Haryana border:

- Abohar-Fazilka line (42.717 km): Included in the 2018 pink book.
- Chandigarh-Ludhiana line (112 km): Included in the 2018 pink book.

==== Rajasthan ====
- Bhatinda-Dabwali-Hanumangarh-Pilibangan-Suratgarh line: Electrification began in 2018–19 at a cost of ₹350 crore.
- New rail links near the Haryana border:
  - Sardarshar-Lunkaransar line (82 km): A survey was announced in 2013 to connect end points for military requirements. In the 2015 budget, an additional ₹9 lakh was allocated for survey work.
  - Sardarshar-Taranagar-Sadulpur (Rajgarh) line (100 km): A survey was announced in 2015 to connect existing end points.
  - Sardarshahar-Nohar-Sirsa line via Jingana-GudianaKhera-Arniawali-Bajekan (94 km): A survey was announced in 2013, and cost estimates were prepared. In the 2015 budget, an additional ₹14 lakh allocated for survey work.
  - Sardarshahar-Suratgarh-Gajsinghpur line (115 km): A survey was announced in 2015.
  - Gajsinghpur (Pakistani border)-Padampur-Goluwala-Pilibanga-Rawatsar-Sahawa-Taranagar-Daderwa-Sadulpur(Rajgarh) line: A survey was announced in 2013 to connect end points for military requirements. In the 2015 budget, an additional ₹44 lakh was allocated for survey work.
  - Neemkathana (on the Delhi-Rewari-Jaipur line)-Sikar-Salasar-Sujangarh line (150 km): A survey was announced in 2013.
  - Alwar-Behror-Narnaul-Charkhi Dadri line: A survey, announced in 2013, was pending approval in 2015.
  - Dausa-Gangapur line (92.67 km): Included in the 2018 NCR pink book
  - Ratlam-Banswara-Dungarpur line (176.47 km): Included in the 2018 NCR pink book.
  - Gauge conversions (planned completion March 2022):
    - Jaipur-Reengus-Churu and Sikar-Loharu (320.04 km): Included in the 2018 NCR pink book.
    - Suratpura-Hanumangarh-Sri Ganganagar (240.95 km): Included in the 2018 NCR pink book.
    - Sadulpur-Bikaner and Ratangarh-Degana (394.35 km): Included in the 2018 NCR pink book.
- New rail links from Rajasthan to Madhya Pradesh:
  - Jhalawar-Biaora-Bhopal line: A tender was issued for construction in 2014.
  - Gauge conversions (planned completion March 2022):
    - Jaipur-Bhopal link: Gwaliar-Sheopur-Kota line (284 km) included in the 2018 NCR pink book.
    - Agra-Kota-Ujjain-Khandwa-Akola-Washim link: Gangapur, Sawai Madhopur Dhaulpur-Sirmuttra-Gangapur line (144.6 km) included in the 2018 NCR pink book.

==== Uttar Pradesh ====
New rail links near the Haryana border:

- Karnal-Haridwar: Deoband-Roorkee line (27.45 km) included in the 2018 pink book.
- Mathura-Vrindavan line (11 km) included in the 2018 NCR pink book.

==== Uttrakhand ====
Char Dham Railway: New rail links in Uttrakhand near the Haryana border

==== National freight corridors ====
The Diamond Quadrilateral high-speed rail network and the Eastern (72 km) and Western Dedicated Freight Corridors (177 km) pass through Haryana.

==== Special rail ====
- UNESCO World Heritage Kalka Shimla Railway with vistadome
- Tourist rail: The Sri Krishna circuit on the Vrindavan-Mathura-Govardhan-Barsana-Kurukshetra route and the Hemu heritage circuit on the Delhi-Rewari-Madhogarh-Panipat route
- Luxury trains in Haryana are the Delhi-Rewari Fairy Queen Heritage Train and the proposed Delhi-Rewari-Madhogarh Heritage Rail Circuit.

=== High-speed rail ===
==== Semi-high-speed rail (160-200 km/h) ====
The Delhi-Agra and Delhi-Chandigarh routes will be converted to an average speed of 160–200 km per hour.

===== Rapid Rail Transport System (RRTS) =====
The under-construction Delhi-Alwar RRTS and Delhi-Sonepat-Panipat RRTS will pass through Haryana. In December 2017, the National Capital Region Transport Corporation signed cooperation agreements with Administrador de Infraestructuras Ferroviarias (Spain's state-owned company) and Société nationale des chemins de fer français (France's state-owned company) to develop rapid-rail smart projects. The Delhi-Meerut, Delhi-Panipat and Delhi-Alwar Smart Lines have been prioritized for inclusion in the first phase of NCR RRTS, and will operate from Sarai Kale Khan in Delhi. With a 180-km/h design speed, 160-km/h operational speed and 100-km/h average speed, six-car trains carrying 1,154 passengers will run every 5 to 10 minutes on underground or elevated tracks where passengers will not have to change trains. Thirty-five to 40 percent of funding will be from the central and state governments, with the remaining 60 percent from multilateral funding agencies. The Delhi-Alwar line will have 19 stations: nine underground stations from ISBT Kashmere Gate to Kherki Daula and 10 elevated stations on its 124.5-km route.

==== High-speed rail (200-500 km/h) ====
The Diamond Quadrilateral's Delhi-Mumbai and Delhi–Amritsar high-speed rail lines, via Sohna-Rewari-Narnaul, will pass through Haryana. The Ministry of Railways established the High Speed Rail Corporation of India Limited on February 12, 2016, to promote high-speed rail corridors. The ministry's "Vision 2020" white paper envisages regional high-speed rail projects to provide service at 250–350 km/h, and plans for corridors connecting commercial, tourist, and pilgrimage hubs. Six corridors have been identified for technical studies on high-speed elevated-rail corridors, including two in Haryana.

=== Metro service ===
- Faridabad and Ballabgarh: Violet Line (Delhi Metro)
- Bahadurgarh: Green Line (Delhi Metro)
- Gurugram: Yellow Line (Delhi Metro) and Rapid Metro Gurgaon

==== Proposed ====
- Chandigarh and Panchkula: Chandigarh Metro
- Sonipat extension (Red Line): In June 2017, the Haryana cabinet approved an investment of ₹968.20 (US$150 million) as its share of the 80:20 equity ratio with the union government for the 4.86-kilometre (3.02 mi) extension of the Delhi Metro from Rithala to Sonipat via Bawana, with three elevated stations: at Narela in Delhi, on the Delhi border at the Kundli Industrial Area, and at the Nathupur Industrial Area in Sonipat. They were planned to be built from April 2018 to March 2022 as part of the metro's Phase IV.
- Bahadurgarh Green Line extension: An extension of the Green Line from Mundka along NH 9 was scheduled for completion by December 2017.
- Rohtak Green Line extension: An extension of the Green Line from Bahadurgarh
- Jhajjar Blue Line extension: To Najafgarh and Kharkari in Delhi and Badli and Jhajjar in Haryana.
- Dwarka-AIIMS Bhadsa-Farukh Nagar-Gurugram Blue Line extension: From Dwarka to AIIMS Jhajjar at Badsha, Farukh Nagar and Gurugram in Haryana.
- Dwarka-Gurugram Blue and Orange Line Airport Express extension: A second connection via Kapashera and Bijwasan, on the Haryana border. A proposal was prepared in November 2017 for two routes.
- Gurugram-Manesar Yellow Line extension: To the Manesar industrial township in the west
- Balramgrah (Faridabad)-Palwal Violet Line extension: From Balramgarh (Ballabhgarh) to Palwal district headquarters

== Multimodal transport ==
Five Multimodal Transit Centres (MMTCs) are being built along the Western Peripheral Expressway (WPE) near railway stations, metro, RRTS and national highways:

- Sonipat: Kundli MMTS, between the Rajiv Gandhi Education City RRTS station and the WPE interchange
- Bahadurgarh MMTS, between the Bahadurgarh bus stand and metro station
- Ballabhgarh MMTS, between the Ballabhgarh metro station, the bus stand and the railway station
- Panchagaon Chowk MMTS, between the proposed metro station and the Gurugram RRTS station
- Kherki Daula MMTS, near the proposed metro station, the Delhi-Alwar RRTS station and the bus stand at the junction of Chhapra and Naihati villages.

=== Logistics hubs ===
- IMLH Nangal Choudhary, in Mahendragarh district, with US$3.3 billion (₹86,000 crore) in initial investment, is an integrated multimodal logistics hub in Nangal Choudhary which is part of the Delhi–Mumbai Industrial Corridor (DMIC) project.
- IMT Kundli, in Sonepat district, is part of the DMIC on the Western Dedicated Freight Corridor (WDFC) and in the influence zone of the Amritsar–Kolkata Industrial Corridor (ADKIC) on the Eastern Dedicated Freight Corridor (EDFC).
- IMT Manesar, in Faridabad district, had over US$10 billion invested by 2017 and is part of the DMIC on the WDFC and in the influence zone of the ADKIC on the EDFC.
- IMT Bawal, in Rewari district, is an industrial centre which has been developed by the Haryana State Industrial and Infrastructure Development Corporation (HSIIDC). It is part of the DMIC on the WDFC, and is in the influence zone of the ADKIC on the EDFC.

== Issues ==
Issues include a lack of progress on announced projects, comprehensive long-term transport-needs analysis and planning, funding, connectivity, integration with multimodal transport, effective use of existing infrastructure (such as integrated logistics and industrial hubs), and land acquisition.

== See also ==
- Indian Railways organisational structure
- Airports in Haryana
- List of highways in Haryana
- Administrative divisions of Haryana
