= Administrative divisions of Haryana =

Regional divisions in Haryana

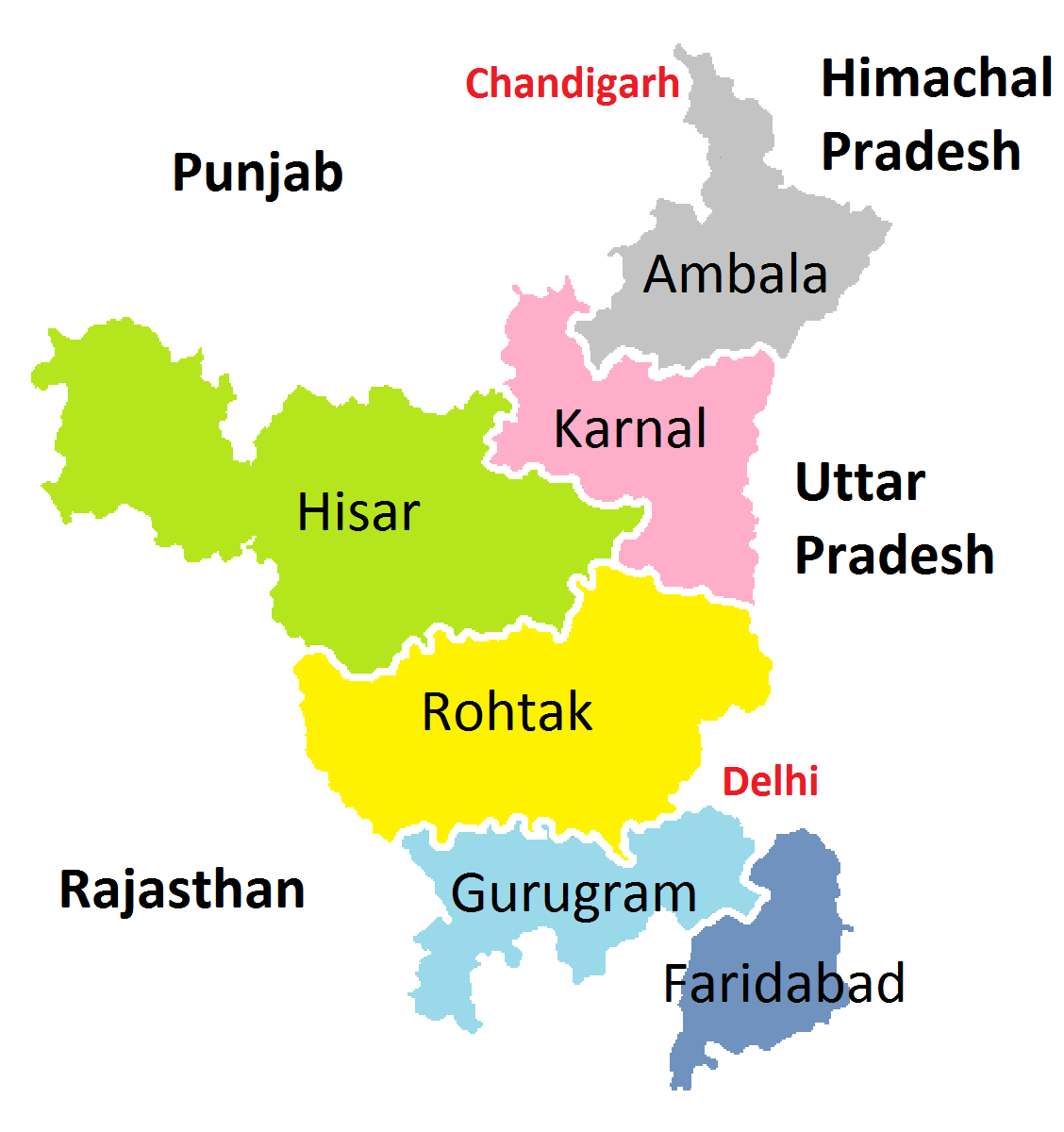
Administrative Divisions of Haryana

Haryana, formed on 1 November 1966, is a state in North India. For the administrative purpose, Haryana is divided into 6 revenue divisions which are further divided into 22 districts. For Law and Order maintenance, it is divided into 5 Police Ranges and 4 Police Commissionerates.

== Administrative divisions ==
=== Civil administration and revenue divisions ===
Administration of Haryana is divided into Revenue divisions composed of districts. Districts are further subdivided in to tehsils of the revenue administration and the Community development blocks for the development work.

Haryana has 6 administrative divisions, 23 districts, 80 sub-divisions, 94 revenue tehsils, 50 sub-tehsils, 142 community development blocks, 154 cities and towns, 7,030 villages and 6234 villages panchayats.

Divisions	Districts
Ambala	Ambala, Kurukshetra, Panchkula, Yamuna Nagar
Faridabad	Faridabad, Palwal, Nuh
Gurugram	Gurugram, Mahendragarh, Rewari
Hisar	Fatehabad, Jind, Hisar, Sirsa Hansi
Rohtak	Jhajjar, Charkhi Dadri, Rohtak, Sonipat, Bhiwani
Karnal	Karnal, Panipat, Kaithal

== Engineering divisions ==
=== Electricity distribution zones ===
Haryana Power Generation Corporation is responsible for producing and procuring power, and the following two Government of Haryana PSUs are responsible for the distribution of electricity to the consumers and industries in the south and north zone, respectively:

- Dakshin Haryana Bijli Vitran Nigam, south zone distributor.HQ (OP) Hisar and Delhi.
- Uttar Haryana Bijli Vitran Nigam, north zone distributor.HQ(OP) Rohtak and Panchkula.

=== Irrigation commands ===
There are 6 command areas based on the systems of arterial supply canal and its end user branches and feeders.

- Bhakra Canal Command: Fed by Sutlej river, controls Bhakra Canal network within northern Haryana along Punjab border in the districts of Kaithal, northern Jind (Narwana), Sirsa, Fatehabad, parts of Hisar (down to Hisar city).
- Yamuna Canal Command: Fed by Western Yamuna Canal, controls this network within northeastern, east and central Haryana in the districts of Karnal, Jind, Rohtak, Hansi-I area of Hisar, Tosham, Bhiwani, Jhajjar, Sonepat, Panipat, and Karnal.
- Siwani Canal Command: Fed by Western Yamuna Canal command, covers Siwani, Isharwal, Jhumpa areas of Bhiwani district.
- Jui Canal Command: Fed by Western Yamuna Canal command, covers narrow tract of Kairu and Jui in Bhiwani district.
- Loharu Canal Command: Fed by Western Yamuna Canal command, covers districts of Charkhi Dadri and Loharu and Bahal areas of Bhiwani.
- JNL Canal Command: Fed by Western Yamuna Canal command, covers districts of Rewari and Mahendragarh.
- Gurugaon Canal Command: Fed by Western Yamuna Canal command, covers tract of Gurugaon, Nuh, Ferozepur Jhirka, Faridabad city, etc.
- Agra Canal Command: Directly fed by Yamuna river, covers narrow tract of Ballabhgarh and Palwal district.

== Police divisions ==
=== Police commissionerates ===
Police commissionerates of Haryana, total 5 in number, are as follows (c. January 2024):

Commissionerate	Urban area
Faridabad Commissionerate	Faridabad
Gurugram Commissionerate	Gurugram
Panchkula Commissionerate	Panchkula
Sonipat Commissionerate	Sonipat
Jhajjar Commissionerate	Jhajjar

=== Police ranges ===
Police ranges of Haryana, total 5 in number, each headed by an officer not below the rank of ADG of Police reporting to the Director General of Police, are as follows (c. September 2018):

#	Police range	Districts
1	Ambala	Ambala
1	Ambala	Yamunanagar
1	Ambala	Kurukshetra
2	Hisar	Hisar
2	Hisar	Hansi (Police District)
2	Hisar	Fatehabad
2	Hisar	Sirsa
2	Hisar	Jind
3	Karnal	Karnal
3	Karnal	Panipat
3	Karnal	Kaithal
4	South	Mahendragarh
4	South	Rewari
4	South	Palwal
4	South	Nuh
5	Rohtak	Rohtak
5	Rohtak	Jhajjar
5	Rohtak	Bhiwani
5	Rohtak	Sonipat
Charkhi Dadri

=== Prisons ===
See list of prisons in Haryana.

== Electoral divisions ==
=== Lok Sabha ===
Lok Sabha constituencies in Haryana. Reserved constituencies in yellow.

For electing the national-level Government of India, there are 10 Lok Sabha constituencies in Haryana. Current Lok Sabha constituencies in Haryana are: Ambala, Bhiwani–Mahendragarh, Faridabad, Gurgaon, Hisar, Karnal, Kurukshetra, Rohtak, Sirsa, and Sonipat.

=== Vidhan sabha ===
Haryana Vidhan Sabha constituencies, reserved constituencies in yellow.

For electing the state-level Government of Haryana, there are 90 Vidhan Sabha constituencies of Haryana Legislative Assembly, of which 17 are reserved constituencies for the scheduled castes.

== Forests and wildlife divisions ==
Principal Chief Conservator of Forests head the Forests Department, Haryana, there are separate two divisions each for wildlife and forests:

=== Forests zones ===
There are 2 Forests Protections zone and 4 Forests circles/divisions, i.e. 2 circles per zone.

- Forests Protection zone-1: Panchkula, covers geographical northern half of Haryana. It consists of North Forests Circle/Division which covers northeast geographical quadrant of Haryana including Shivalik Hills and down to Sonipat and West Forests Circle/Division which Covers northwest geographical quadrant of Haryana including Sirsa, Hisar, Jind.
- Forests Protection zone-2: Based at Gurugram, covers geographical southern half of Haryana. It consists of Central Forests Circle/Division which covers central geographical quadrant of Haryana including Rohtak, Jhajjar, Charkhi Dadri, Bhiwani, Mahendragarh etc. and South Forests Circle/Division which covers geographical South Haryana including Faridabad, Nuh, Palwal, etc.

=== Wildlife areas ===
Wildlife zones

There are two Wildlife zones, each headed by the Chief Conservator of Wildlife.

- Wildlife North zone: Based at Panchkula, covers geographical northern half of Haryana including Shivalik Hills to Sirsa, to Hisar to Rohtak.
- Wildlife South zone: Based at Gurugram, covers geographical southern half of Haryana including Charkhi Dadri, Bhiwani, Mahendragarh, Nuh, palwal, Gurugram, Faridabad, etc.

Wildlife corridors

- Sariska-Delhi leopard corridor
- Sahibi wildlife corridor (planned)
- Shivalik wildlife corridor
- Yamuna wildlife corridor

National parks and protected areas

See List of national parks and wildlife sanctuaries of Haryana.

== Geographical regions ==
Haryana is bounded by the Shivalik (Himalaya's foothills) in the northeast, Yamuna in the east which enters Haryana in the northeast from Shivalik hills and it forms the natural border between Haryana and Uttar Pradesh, Aravalli in South Haryana which also includes Mewat and Ahirawal as well as parts of Vedic era region of Braj and Matsya, Bagar tract in the west along the Haryana-Rajasthan border, and in the north it is bounded by the channel of Ghaggar River (paleo Sarasvati River, including its tributary present day Chautang which is paleo channel of vedic era Drishadvati river) along Haryana-Punjab border.

Regions, clockwise from northeast, are as follows.

=== Shivalik in northeast ===
Areas of Haryana lying in Siwalik Hills range, i.e. northern parts of Panchkula and Yamunanagar district as well as Naraingarh tehsil of Ambala.

=== Yamuna basin in east ===
==== GT Road belt ====
GT Road belt is the geographical area on either side of the Grand Trunk Road from Delhi to Ambala. Upland areas around Indri north of Karnal is called Nardak. The road itself lies inside the unflooded Bangar area roughly along the demarcation between Yamuna bangar and Yamuna Khadir. GT Road is a new term for the ancient vedic era route which was later rehabilitated by Ashoka (268 to 232 BCE), Harsha (c. 590–647 CE), and Sher Shah Suri (1486 – 22 May 1545), etc.

==== Yamuna Bangar ====
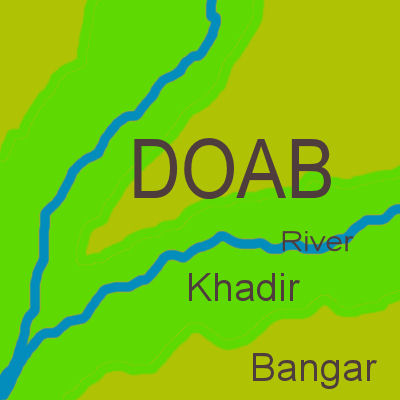
In a doab, khadar (green) floodplain lies next to a river, unflooded bangar (olive) with higher elevation lies further from river.

Yamuna Bangar in Yamuna basin is the upland area of Haryana which does not get flooded. Northern end of it is called Nardak.

===== Deshwal =====
Deshwal region of Haryana covers the districts of Panipat, Sonipat, Rohtak, Jhajjar, southern part of Jind. Sometimes, its definition is widened to include the southwest Kurukshetra, southern Kaithal, non-bagar tracts of Hisar and Bhiwani as well as Charkhi Dadri. Deshwal region covers both bangar and Khadir areas. The area within Deshwal to the east of Grant Trunk Road is called Deshwali khadir which gets flooded and the unflooded area to the west of Grant Trunk Road in Deshwal region is called Deshwali khadir. Comparatively, a much larger area of Deshwal in Haryana is bangar (unflooded upland) area.

===== Nardak =====
Nardak ("high tract" or bangar) is a region in western and northern parts of Karnal district in northeastern area of Haryana state of India. All definitions of this area include Assandh, Nissing and Nilokheri Community Development Blocks (CDB) in western and northern parts of Karnal district, and it ends in the north of Karnal city at Indri where Nardak, Khadir and Bangar areas of Yamuna river basin meet. Nardak is a title of the Kurukshetra from the words "Nirdukh", meaning the "painless". Nardak is the high tract, hence a sub-region of bangar (unflooded) region of Yamuna river.

During the Vedic era, it was part of Kuru janapada, hence presently has many Mahabharata era tirthas which are part of the wider 48 Kos Parikrama of Kurukshetra. Presently, Nardak area lies on either side of Grand Trunk Road.

==== Yamuna Khadir ====
Khadir (खादर) is any low-lying floodplains of a river usually relatively narrower compared to unflooded bangar area. Khadar areas are prone to flooding and sometimes include portions of former river-beds that became available for agriculture when a river changes course. It is moisture retentive and sticky when wet. Khadir soil consists of new alluvial soil relatively higher in new silt content from the river, gets replenished with each flooding cycle, and is often very fertile. Haryana has two such floodplains, Yamuna Khadir and Nali.

Yamuna Khadir, or simply Khadir, is a fertile floodland area lying between the Yamuna river and the Grand Trunk Road, i.e. eastern parts of Sonepat, Panipat, Karnal and Kurukshetra as well as southeastern Yamunanagr district.

=== Aravalli in South Haryana: Ahirwal, Braj and Mewat ===
Areas of Haryana lying in Aravalli hills range mostly fall within Ahirwal and Mewat regions.

- Vedia era janapada regions are:
  - Braj includes Palwal district and Faridabad district. 84 kos Braj Mandal Parikrama also passes by many villages in Palwal district. This Parikrama starts from Banchari.
  - Kuru including Gurugram and Faridabad, Palwal in Aravali area. Kuru also extended along Yamuna to Kurukshetra.
  - Matsya Narnaul, Rewari, Mahendergarh, Kanina, Nuh, etc. which also corresponds with the present day Ahirawal and Mewat regions.
- Pre-Islamic Hindu-Rajput era regions:
  These areas were part of Alwar kingdom ruled by Kachhwaha Rajputs who claim descent from Kusha - the eldest son of Rama. These areas were adjacent Dhundhar, also called Jaipur region under Jaipur kingdom, to Dhundhar's the east and northeast side.
  - Bighoto: Historic region which covered present day districts of Rewari and Mahendragarh.
  - Chandain: Historic region, which covered 12 villages of Taoru, was a subdivision of the bigger Bighoto region, which in turn was part of Alwar State. This region overlaps with and also lies entirely within Mewat.
  - Dhundhoti: Historic region which covered present day districts of Gurugram has its seat of power at Garhi Harsaru.
- Medieval and present day regions:
  - Ahirwal: Ahir dominated areas such as Narnaul, Rewari, Kanina, Mahendergarh and parts of Faridabad district
  - Mewat: narrow tract in Haryana in Nuh district from Nuh city ion the north to Ferozepur Jhirka in the south and till Ujina and Uttawar in the east. Mewat, Meo-dominated area, covers much larger area which spans the contiguous area in Rajasthan.

=== Bagar Region or Westen Haryana ===
Bagar region or Bagad (बागड़), from "Bar" meaning the dry country, refers to the area where Bagri language is spoken by majority of population characterised by sandy tract of north-western India and eastern Pakistan bordering Rajasthan, India which are now transformated into fertile tracts, irrigated by Bhakhra canal, Indira Gandhi Canal, Gang canal in India. In Haryana, it covers Sirsa district and western villages of Fatehabad, Hisar district, Bhiwani district and Charkhi Dadri district. in Rajasthan it covers Anupgarh district, Sri Ganganagar district; Hanumangarh district; Taranagar tehsil in Churu district. Chak, type of villages, were established in the northern part of this tract along the canal network during British Raj. Smaller settlements in the farms are called dhani.

=== Sarasvati-Ghaggar-Chautang basin in north ===
This area lies in the Ghaggar-Chautang doab in northwestern Haryana bounded by Narvana, Hansi, Hisar and Ellenabad. It is considered as one of the most productive farmland areas in Haryana with a high yield of wheat, rice, mustard, kinnow, green leafy vegetables and cotton especially.

==== Sarasvati-Ghaggar basin ====
Bangar remains unflooded, while Nali (also called Khadir) becomes flooded during the rainy season.

===== Sarasvati-Ghaggar bangar =====
These are areas along either side of Ghaggar that do not get flooded. They lie in the district of Jind (Narwana), Fatehabad, north Hisar and Sirsa. This basin has numerous Sarasvati-Indus Valley civilisation sites.

===== Nali khadir or Ghaggar khadir =====
Nali area, or simply Nali (नाळी), is the fertile floodland Khadir area in Fatehabad and Sirsa districts between the Ghaggar river and the southern limits of the Saraswati palaeochannel depression that gets flooded during the rains. It includes areas such as Sardulgarh on Punjab-Haryana Border, Rori, Mirpur, Panniwala Motta, Rania, Jiwan Nagar and Ellenabad in Sirsa District and Tibi of adjacent Tibi tehsil in Hanumangarh District of Rajasthan. Parts of this also lie in Narwana (north Jind region). Kunal is an important Sarasvati-Indus Valley civilisation site on the paleo bank of Sarasvati (Ghaggar) river.

==== Drishadvati-Chautang basin ====
This area lies in the Ghaggar-Chautang doab in northwestern Haryana.

===== Chautang bangar =====
The area which get flooded along and either side of Chautang include area in the tehsils of Jind, Hansi, Hisar, Bawani Khera, Siwani,

===== Chautang khadir =====
The area which get flooded along Chautang include low lying areas of Jind, Hansi, Hisar. This is the paleo channel of Drishadvati. The Sarasvati-Indus Valley civilisation sites on the paleo channel of Drishadvati are Rakhigarhi, Lohari Ragho, Banawali and Sothi which lies in the western Haryana districts of Hisar, Fatehabad and Sirsa.

== Industrial zones and corridors ==
HSIIDC has developed at least 11 specialised "Industrial Clusters and Theme Parks", 24 "Industrial Estate (IE)" (each with an area larger than at least 610 ha (1,500 acres)), "Industrial Model Township (IMT)" (smaller than 610 ha (1,500 acres)), and an IT Park (denoted by double asterisk or star symbol). Haryana has at least 24 IEs, 7 IMT, an IT Park, and several Integrated Multimodel Logistics Hubs (IMLH) in the state of Haryana.

Industrial corridors

- Amritsar Delhi Kolkata Industrial Corridor
- Delhi–Mumbai Industrial Corridor

Industrial clusters and theme parks

- Textile Hub, Panipat
- IIDC Narwana in Jind
- Food Park, Saha
- Growth Centre, Saha
- Footwear Park, Bahadurgarh
- Apparel Park, Barhi
- Theme Park, Kundli
- Electronic Hardware Technology Park, Kundli
- EPIP, Kundli
- Food Park, Rai
- Mega Food Park, Rai

Industrial estates and townships

See the list of 30+ industrial estates and townships spread across Haryana.

== Interfluve ==
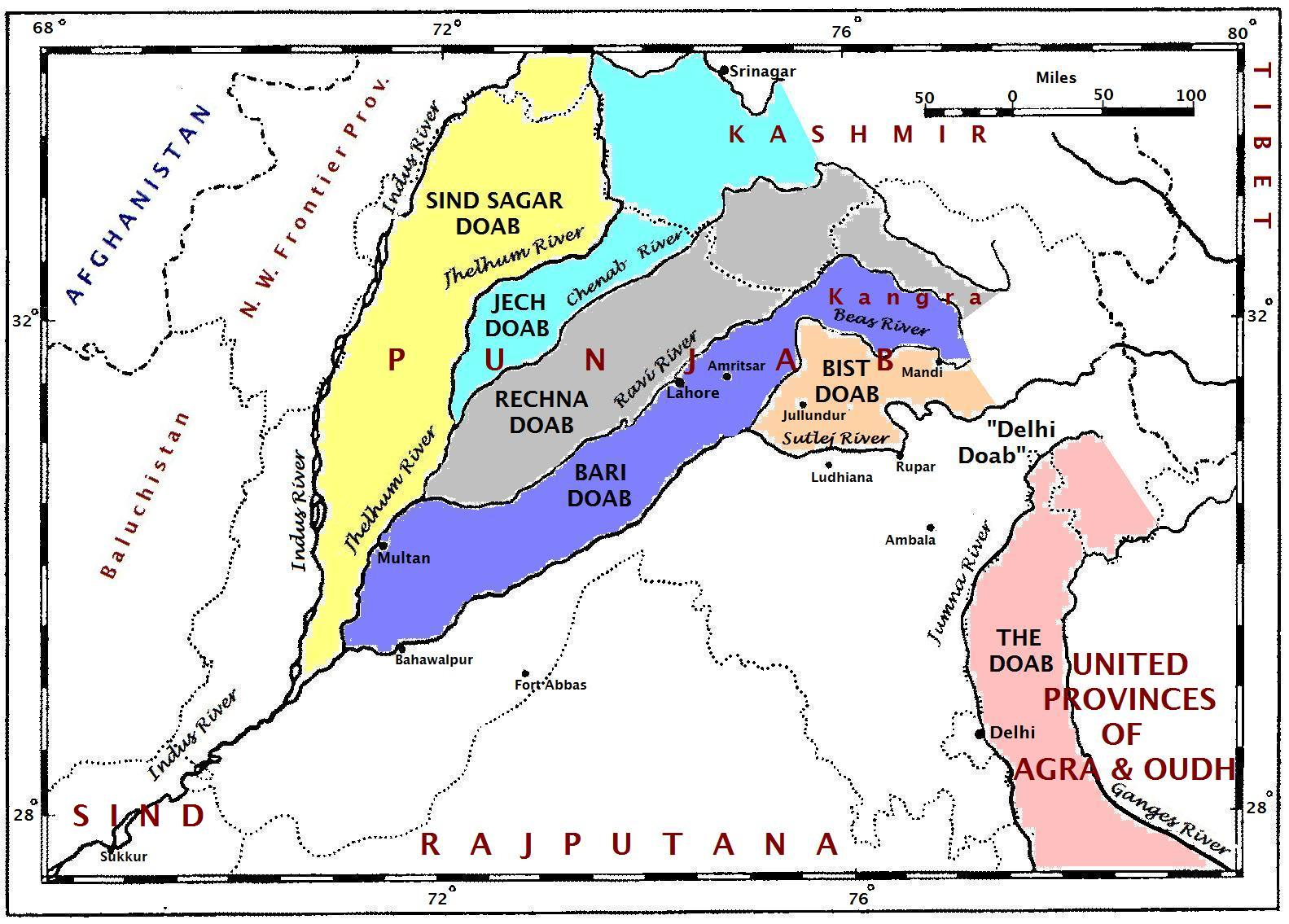
A map of the Punjab region c. 1947 showing the different doabs.

Doab (interfluve) is land lying between two confluent rivers

=== Extant doab ===
- Sarsuti-Ghaggar doab: It is the only extant doab which covers the entire length of northern border of Haryana with Punjab, i.e. districts of Panchkula, eastern Yamunanagar, Ambala, northern Kurukshetra, Kaithal, northern Jind, northern Fatehabad and northern Sirsa.

=== Palaeo doab ===
- Sarasvati-Yamuna doab / Ghaggar-Yamuna doab: Almost all of the northern border of Haryana is roughly defined by the course of present-day seasonal Sarsuti river, which is one of many Palaeochannel of Sarasvati river. It is now the tributary of present-day Ghaggar river, which is currently the most voluminous or main ramnant channel of Sarasvati river. Almost all of the eastern border of Haryana is roughly defined by the course of Yamuna river. Area between the ancient Sarasvati (with its several palaeochannel in Haryana, including Sarsuti and Ghaggar, and the largest paleo tributary Dhrisdhavati) and Yamuna is called the Sarasvati-Yamuna doab. According to the paleo studies, the earliest paleo channel of Sarasvati flowed southeast collecting Sahibi river and converging with Yamuna. This Sarasvati-Yamuna doab covered the area of districts of Panchkula, Ambala, Yamunanagr, Kurukshetra, Kaithal, parts of Jind, Karnal, Panipat, Sonepat, Rohtak, Jhajjar and Gurugram. It remains a matter of further study if Sarasvati ever confluenced with Ganges-Yamuna at Prayagraj as alluded to in the Hindu texts, if this hypothesis if found to be true, Sarasvati would have also flowed through Rwari, Fridabad and Nuh districts of Haryana and would have collected Chambal and Betwa rivers as its tributaries. Since Sarasvati and Yamuna no longer confluence, this palaeo Sarasvati-Yamuna doab no longer exists. Only extant doab in Haryana is Sarsuti-Ghaggar doab. Palaeo Sarasvati-Yamuna doab could be subdivided into the following doabs of Drishadvati-Sahibi doab, Drishadvati-Sahibi doab and Sahibi-Yamuna doab.
- Sarasvati-Drishadvati doab / Ghaggar-Drishadvati doab: This palaeo doab covered the area lying between Ghaggar river (palaeochannel of Sarasvati) and the palaeochannel Drishadvati river which confluenced in Hanumangarh district immediately northwest of Haryana. This doab area included entire Northern Haryana on Haryana-Punjab, i.e. districts of Panchkula, Ambala, Yamunanagar, Kurukshetra, Kaithal, Jind, northern part of Hisar, Fatehabad and Sisra.
- Drishadvati-Sahibi doab / Ghaggar-Sahibi doab: This palaeo doab covered the area of northwestern Haryana, i.e. districts of Sirsa, Fatehabad, Hisar, Bhiwani, Charkhi Dadri and Mahendragarh.
- Sahibi-Yamuna doab: This palaeo doab covered the area lying between Sahibi river and Yamuna. This doab area included South Haryanam i.e. districts of Rewari, southern Gurugam, Southern Faridabad, Nuh and Palwal.

== Language zones ==
- Hindi (Central Zone)
  - Haryanvi language
    - Deswali (dialect)(also called Deshwali, Desari and Desaru, spoken in Deswal region covering districts of Rohtak, Sonipat and Jhajjar.
    - Standard Haryanvi (dialect) spoken in Jind, Hisar, Hansi, Bhiwani, Tosham, Charki Dadri, Meham.
    - Jatu (dialect) (dialect of the Jats) sub-dialect of deswali, spoken by Jats and Rors in low-lying khadir flood planes on western banks of Yamuna in Panipat, Karnal, Kuruksehtra and Yamunanagar districts.
    - Bangru (dialect) (also called Banagaru, Hariani & Haryiani, spoken in areas between Khadar region, Bagar region and deswali region in Kaithal District, Pehowa, Tohana, Barwala, Narwana and Assandh.
  - Bagri language spoken in (Bagar region of sandy western Haryana covering Sirsa, Ellenabad, Fatehabad, Adampur, Balsamand, Siwani and Bahal in Haryana.
  - Sansi language (distinct language of Sansi nomads, with influence of Rajasthani, Punjabi, Haryanvi and Hindi languages)
  - Mewati language is spoken in Nuh District, Sohna and part of Palwal District.
    - Ahirwati dialect of Mewati language is spoken in Rewari, Mahendragarh, Narnaul, Loharu, Matanheil and parts of Gurugram District like Pataudi and Manesar.
    - Rangri dialect is another type for Haryanvi language used by Haryanvi-Muslim migrants living in Pakistan.
- Braj Bhasha in Faridabad and Palwal districts.
- Pahari languages in hill areas of Ambala, Panchkula and Yamuna Nagar districts.
- Punjabi languages
  - Puadhi dialect is spoken in districts of Panchkula District, Ambala District and parts of Kuruksehtra District like Shahbad Markanda.
  - Malwai dialect is spoken in northern Sirsa District which includes Mandi Dabwali, Kalanwali and Odhan. It also spoken in Ratia Tehsil of Fatehbad District and guhla cheeka of kaithal District
  - Rathi dialect is spoken in central Sirsa District and northern Fatehabad district.

== Martial zones ==
The modern military history commenced with British colonial rule when George Thomas established modern European style army in 1798 to 1801, and later Colonel James Skinner (1778 – 4 December 1841) the Anglo-Indian military adventurer in India founded 1st Skinner's Horse and 3rd Skinner's Horse at Asigarh Fort at Hansi in 1803 which is now part of the Indian Army.

=== Military zones ===
Current military stations

- Indian Army
  - Ambala Cantonment
  - Hisar Military Station
- Indian Air Force
  - Ambala AFS
  - Faridabad Logistics AFS
  - Gurugram store
  - Sirsa AFS
- Indian Navy
  - Gurugram IMAC

Defunct British Raj cantonments

- Asigarh Fort (Prithviraj Chauhan, George Thomas, Skinner)
- Karnal Cantonment (British raj)
- Bharawas (Company rule)
- Jharsa (Begum Samru)

Defunct princely state garrisons (^ denotes abolished in 1858)

- Jat Raja (Hindu-Sikh)
  - Buria of Jat Sikh
  - Balramgarh^ of Hindu Raja Nahar Singh
  - Jind State of Phulkian Jat Sikh
  - Kaithal State of Phulkian Jat Sikh
  - Kalsia of Jat Sikh
  - Kapurthala State (Narwana) of Phulkian Jat Sikh
- Pathan Nawab (Muslim)
  - Bahadurgarh^ of Muslim Pathan
  - Dujana^ of Yusufzai Pathan Muslim
  - Jhajjar^ of Pathan Muslim
  - Loharu State of Pathan Muslim

=== Para-military zones ===
This is a partial list, please help expand.

- Border Security Force
  - Hisar BSF Camp
- Central Industrial Security Force (CISF)
  - Mandawar CISF, Sohna
- Central Reserve Police Force (CRPF)
  - Hisar CRPF Camp
- National Security Guard (NSG) at Manesar
- CRPF CAMP KHEWRA(SONIPAT)

== Tourist and archaeological zones ==
Haryana State Directorate of Archaeology & Museums and Haryana Tourism are responsible for archaeology and tourism in Haryana respectively.

- Highest point
- National monuments
- State monuments
- Indus-Sarasvati civilisation sites
- Monuments and memorials
- Culture
- Dams
- Forts
- Lakes
- Mountains
- Museums
- Music
- Temples
- Tourist attractions
- Other

== Transport ==
=== Aviation zones ===
Haryana has 6 civil and 2 military aviation zones / airports. See airports in Haryana.

Civil

- Bhiwani Airport
- Gurugram Airstrip
- Hisar Airport
- Karnal Airport
- Narnaul Airport
- Pinjore Airport

Military

- Ambala Air Force Station
- Sirsa Air Force Station

National and state capitals

- Chandigarh Airport
- IGI Airport

=== Integrated multimodel logistics hubs ===
There are many existing and proposed Integrated Multimodel Logistics Hubs (IMLH) in the state of Haryana including the following existing IMLH with containerised road and rail facilities and/or air facilities (denoted by asterisk):

- Manesar road cargo and railway sliding for Maruti Suzuki on Western Peripheral Expressway.
- Nangal Choudhary IMLH on Delhi–Mumbai Industrial Corridor.
- Pinjore IMLH* for the fruits on Ambala Chandigarh Expressway. Bilaspur to be developed as spoke with railway sliding on the proposed Chandigarh-Yamunanagar rail line.
- Sonipat inland container depot and logistics park on Delhi-Chandigarh NH1. Kharkhoda Footwear IMLH in Sonipat under implementation with containerised road and rail cargo.

=== RTO (Regional Transport Office) districts ===
See the list of RTO districts in Haryana.

=== Road corridors ===
- Expressways (EWay)
- National highways (BH)
- State highways (SH)
- Major district roads (MDR)
- Other district roads (ODR)

=== Railway zones and dedicated corridors ===
Parts of the following 3 zones and their 5 subordinate divisions of Indian Railways fall within Haryana:

Dedicated Freight Corridors

- Eastern Dedicated Freight Corridor
- Western Dedicated Freight Corridor

Railway zones

- North Western Railway zone
  - Bikaner railway division covers western and southern Haryana including Bhatinda-Dabwali-Hanumangarh line, Rewari-Bhiwani-Hisar-Bathinda line, Hisar-Sadulpur line and Rewari-Loharu-Sadulpur line.
  - Jaipur railway division covers south-west Haryana including Rewari-Reengas-Jaipur line, Delhi-Alwar-Jaipur line and Loharu-Sikar line.
- Northern Railway zone
  - Delhi railway division covers north and east and central Haryana including Delhi-Panipat-Ambala line, Delhi-Rohtak-Tohana line, Rewari–Rohtak line, Jind-Sonepat line and Delhi-Rewari line.
  - Ambala railway division covers north-east Haryana including Ambala-Yamunanagar line, Ambala-Kurukshetra line and UNESCO World Heritage Kalka–Shimla Railway. There are 2 Workshops in this division which falls within Haryana: Carriage & Wagon Workshop, Jagadhari and Carriage & Wagon Workshop, Kalka for narrow gauge.
- North Central Railway zone
  - Agra railway division covers very small part of network in south-east Haryana which includes Palwal-Mathura line only.

== See also ==
- History of Haryana
- List of districts of Haryana
- List of tehsils of Haryana
- List of Haryana-related lists
- Outline of Haryana
