= List of tehsils of Haryana =

The following is a list of tehsils of the Indian state of Haryana.

== List of divisions, tehsils, sub tehsils and blocks of Haryana ==
Division	District	Tehsil	Sub Tehsils	Blocks		
Ambala	Ambala	Ambala, Ambala Cantt, Barara, Naraingarh,	Saha, Mullana, Shehzadpur	Ambala, Ambala-2, Barara, Naraingarh, Saha, Shehzadpur		
Ambala	Kurukshetra	Thanesar, Ladwa, Shahabad, Pehowa	Babain, Ismailabad	Thanesar, Ladwa, Shahabad, Pehowa, Babain, Ismailabad, Pipli		
Ambala	Panchkula	Panchkula, Kalka, Raipur Rani	Barwala, Morni	Barwala, Morni, Raipur Rani, Pinjore		
Ambala	Yamuna Nagar	Jagadhri, Radaur, Bilaspur, Chhachhrauli	Saraswati Nagar, Sadhaura, Khizrabad	Jagadhri, Radaur, Bilaspur, Chhachhrauli, Mustafabad, Sadhaura, Khizrabad		
Faridabad	Faridabad	Faridabad, Ballabgarh, Badkhal	Mohana, Tigaon, Dhauj, Dayalpur, Gaunchi	Faridabad, Ballabgarh, Tigaon		
Faridabad	Nuh	Nuh, Ferozepur Jhirka, Punhana, Tauru	Nagina	Nuh, Ferozepur Jhirka, Punhana, Tauru, Nagina, Indri, Pingwan		
Faridabad	Palwal	Palwal, Hathin, Hodal	Hasanpur, Bahin	Palwal Gurjar, Hathin, Hodal, Hasanpur, Prithla, Badoli		
Gurugram	Gurugram	Gurugram, Sohna, Pataudi, Farrukh Nagar, Manesar	Wazirabad, Badshahpur, Kadipur, Harsaru	Gurugram, Sohna, Farrukh Nagar, Pataudi		
Gurugram	Mahendragarh	Mahendragarh, Narnaul, Nangal Chaudhary, Ateli, Kanina	Satnali	Mahendragarh, Narnaul, Nangal Chaudhary, Ateli Nangal, Kanina, Sihma, Nizampur, Satnali		
Gurugram	Rewari	Rewari, Kosli, Bawal	Dharuhera, Dahina, Manethi, Nahar, Palhawas	Rewari, Khol at Rewari, Jatusana, Bawal, Nahar, Dahina		
Hisar	Fatehabad	Fatehabad, Tohana, Ratia	Bhattu Kalan, Bhuna, Kullan, Jakhal	Fatehabad, Tohana, Ratia, Bhattu Kalan, Bhuna, Nagpur, Jakhal		
Hisar	Hisar	Hisar, Hansi, Narnaund, Barwala, Bass, Adampur	Balsamand, Uklana, Kheri Jalab	Hisar-1, Hisar-2, Narnaund, Barwala, Uklana, Adampur, Agroha	Hansi	hansi 1 , Hansi 2
Hisar	Jind	Jind, Narwana, Safidon, Julana, Uchana, Alewa	Pillu Khera	Jind, Narwana, Safidon, Julana, Uchana, Alewa, Pillu Khera, Ujhana		
Hisar	Sirsa	Sirsa, Rania, Dabwali, Ellenabad, Nathusari Chopta, Kalanwali	Goriwala	Sirsa, Rania, Dabwali, Ellenabad, Nathusari Chopta, Odhan, Baragudha		
Karnal	Kaithal	Kaithal, Guhla, Fatehpur Pundri, Kalayat	Siwan, Rajound, Dhand	Kaithal, Guhla at Cheeka, Fatehpur Pundri, Kalayat, Siwan, Rajound, Dhand		
Karnal	Karnal	Karnal, Assandh, Gharaunda, Indri, Nilokheri	Nissing, Kaimla, Nigdhu	Karnal, Assandh, Gharaunda, Indri, Nilokheri, Nissing at Chirao, Munak, Kunjpura		
Karnal	Panipat	Panipat, Samalkha, Israna, Bapouli, Madlauda		Panipat, Samalkha, Israna, Bapouli, Madlauda, Sanoli Khurd		
Rohtak	Bhiwani	Bhiwani, Bawani Khera, Loharu, Tosham, Siwani	Behal	Bhiwani, Bawani Khera, Loharu, Tosham, Siwani, Behal, Kairu		
Rohtak	Charkhi Dadri	Charkhi Dadri, Badhra	Baund Kalan	Charkhi Dadri, Badhra, Jhoju, Baund Kalan		
Rohtak	Jhajjar	Badli, Bahadurgarh, Beri, Jhajjar, Matanhail	Salhawas	Badli, Bahadurgarh, Beri, Jhajjar, Matanhail, Salhawas		
Rohtak	Rohtak	Lakhan Majra	Rohtak, Meham, Kalanaur, Sampla, Lakhan Majra			
Rohtak	Sonipat	Sonipat, Gohana, Ganaur, Kharkhoda	Khanpur Kalan, Rai	Sonipat, Gohana, Ganaur, Kharkhoda, Rai, Mundlana, Kathura, Murthal		
