= Baswa railway station =

Railway station in Rajasthan, India

Baswa

General information
- Location: Baswa, Dausa district, Rajasthan; India
- Coordinates: 27.150157°N 76.575550°E
- Elevation: 288 metres (945 ft)
- System: Indian Railways station
- Owner: Indian Railways
- Operator: North Western Railway
- Line: Delhi–Jaipur line
- Platforms: 2
- Tracks: 2

Construction
- Structure type: Standard (on ground station)
- Parking: Yes

Other information
- Status: Functioning
- Station code: BU
- Zone(s): North Western Railway
- Division(s): Jaipur
Location
- Location within India Location within Rajasthan

Baswa railway station is a railway station in Dausa district, Rajasthan. Its code is BU. It serves Baswa. The station consists of 2 platforms. Passenger, Express trains halt here.
