= Akanwali, Fatehabad =

Akanwali is a village in Tohana Tehsil in Fatehabad district of Haryana, India. It belongs to Hisar Division.

Akanwali is located 38 kilometers east from the district headquarters of Fatehabad. 176 km from the state capital of Chandigarh. Akanwali's Pin code is 125106 and postal head office is Dharsul Kalan. Bhodi, Laluwala, Dher, Hindalwala, and Diwana are nearby villages from Akanwali. Akanwali is surrounded by Jakhal Tehsil towards the north, Bhuna Tehsil towards the south, Ratia Tehsil towards west, Uklana Tehsil towards south. Tohana, Ratia, Narwana are the nearby cities to Akanwali. Agriculture and farming is the main source of income for people residing in this village.

== Languages Spoken ==
Punjabi is the main language of Akanwali. Hindi is also spoken by many people here.

== Nearest Railway Stations ==
1. Jamalpur Sheikhan 6 km.
2. Tohana 12 km.

== Schools in Akanwali ==
1. Govt Senior Secondary School.
2. Primary School

== Banks ==
1. State Bank Of India.
2. Cooperative Kissan Bank
