= Hisar Urban Agglomeration =

Hisar
- City
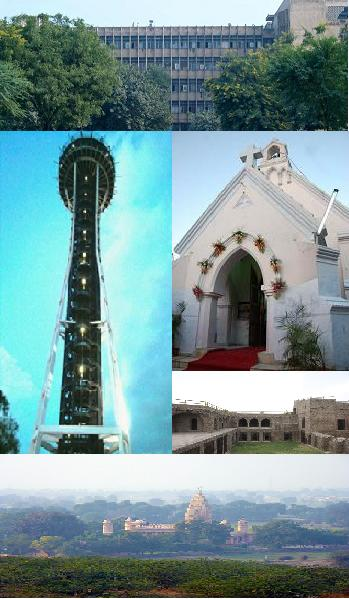
- From top going clockwise: District Administrative Complex, St. Thomas Church, Fort of Firoz Shah, Sheela Mata Temple and observatory at OP Jindal Gyan Kendra.
- Nickname: The city of Steel
- Location within Haryana Location within India
- Coordinates: 29°09′N 75°42′E
- Country: India
- State: Haryana
- District: Hisar
- Division: Hisar
- First settled: 1354
- Incorporated: 1832
- Founded by: Firoz Shah Tughlaq
- Named after: Firoz Shah Tughlaq
- Tehsils: Hisar Sadar

Government
  - Body: Municipal Corporation, Hisar
  - Mayor: Shakuntla Rajliwala
  - Member of Parliament: Dushyant Chautala
- Elevation: 215 m (705 ft)

Population (2011)
  - Total: 301,249
  - Rank: 141
  - Density: 438/km^{2} (1,130/sq mi)

Languages
  - Official: Hindi, Punjabi
- Time zone: UTC+5:30 (IST)
- PIN: 125 xxx
- UNLOCODE: IN HSS
- Telephone code: 91-1662 xxx xxx
- Vehicle registration: HR-20 xxxx (for non-commercial vehicles); HR-39 xxxx (for commercial vehicles)
- Nearest city: New Delhi, Chandigarh
- Sex ratio: 844 ♂/♀
- Literacy: 81.04%
- Lok Sabha constituency: Hisar
- Vidhan Sabha constituency: Hisar
- Planning agency: HUDA
- Civic agency: Hisar Municipal Corporation
- Climate: Cw (Köppen)
- Precipitation: 490.6 millimetres (19.31 in)
- Avg. summer temperature: 32.5 °C (90.5 °F)
- Avg. winter temperature: 17.6 °C (63.7 °F)
- Website: www.hisar.nic.in

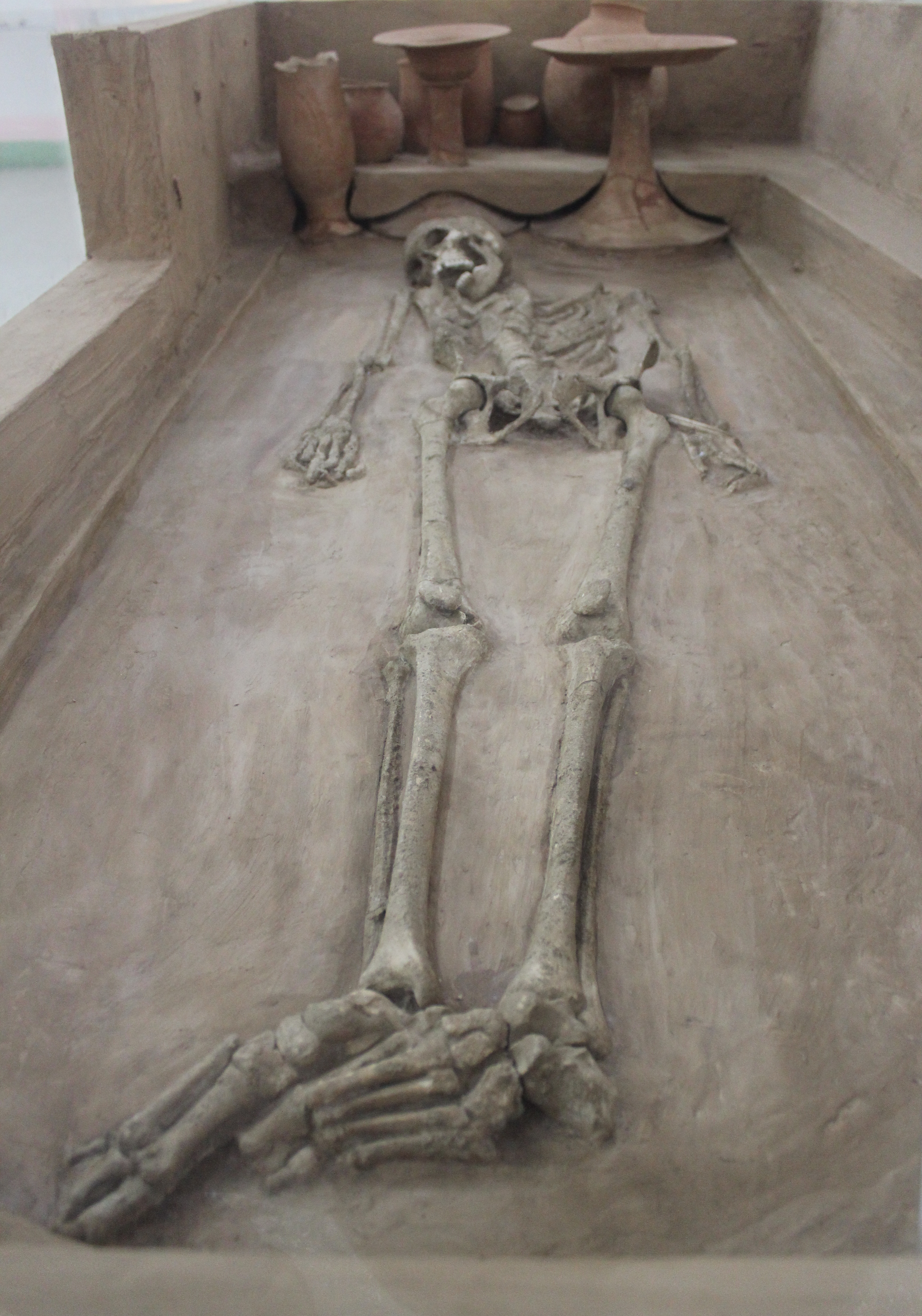
A skeleton from Rakhigarhi Indus Valley Civilisation site in Hisar on display in the National Museum, New Delhi

Hisar Urban Agglomeration is an extended area of the city of Hisar which includes the area under the Municipal Corporation of Hisar and the campus of Chaudhary Charan Singh Haryana Agricultural University along with the Mini Secretariat. It is the second biggest urban agglomeration in Haryana after Faridabad.

== Demographics ==
According to 2011 Census of India, Hisar Urban Agglomeration has a total population of 306,893 of which 166,623 are males and 140,270 are females. Sex ratio is 842 females per thousand males. Overall Literacy rate is 81.17 percent with male literacy rate at 86.28 percent and female literacy rate at 75.08 percent.

== See also ==
- Hisar (city)
- Hisar district
- Hisar division
- Hisar (Vidhan Sabha constituency)
- Hisar (Lok Sabha constituency)
