= Ujina =

Ujina Mewat ka Rajputana Ujina
- Village
- Location in Haryana, India Ujina (India)
- Coordinates: 28.0445423°N 77.0826744°E
- Country: India
- State: Haryana
- District: Nuh

Government
  - Type: Village Panchayat
  - Body: Ujina Village Panchayat
- Elevation: 194 m (636 ft)

Population (2019)
  - Total: 8,500

Languages
  - Official: Hindi
- Time zone: UTC+5:30 (IST)
- PIN: 122107
- Telephone Code: 1267
- ISO 3166 code: IN-HR
- Vehicle registration: HR 27
- Lok Sabha constituency: Gurgaon Lok Sabha Constituency
- Vidhan Sabha constituency: Nuh
- Civic agency: Gram Panchayat, Ujina
- Website: haryana.gov.in

Ujina is a village located in Hodal-Nuh road in Nuh district in Haryana. Ujina is also for the Ujina Lake, which in rainy season is completely covered with water and people of nearby territories often came here for sightseeing and birdwatching.

== History ==
Ujina village was founded by Baba Baijal in nearly 1057 AD.

The People of Ujina actively participated in every war of Independence of India, whether it was the 1857 war.

== Geography ==
Ujina is located at 28.04°N 77.08°E. It has an average elevation of 194 metres (636 feet). It is 83 km from the capital New Delhi. It is located in the far south east area of Haryana.

== Climate ==
Climate in Ujina is Extreme. Lowest Temperature: 3-5 degrees Highest Temperature: 44-45 degrees.

== Demographics ==
As of the 2011 Indian census, Ujina had a population of 8,397 – with 4,427 being male, and 3,970 being female. Of that population, 1,418 (16.89 %) were children aged 0-6, with 755 being boys and 663 being girls.

The average Sex Ratio for Ujina was 897, which was higher than the Haryana state average of 879. The Child Sex Ratio for Ujina was 878, higher than the Haryana average of 834.

Ujina had a lower literacy rate than Haryana. In 2011, the literacy rate in Ujina was 74.77 %, compared to 75.55 % in Haryana. In Ujina, Male literacy stood at 84.10 %, while female literacy rate stood at 64.41 %.

Ujina had a 100% Hindu population.

As per the constitution of India and the Panchyati Raaj Act, Ujina village is administrated by a Sarpanch (Head of Village) who is the elected representative of the village. Mamta Bai w/o Munesh Foji is newly elected Sarpanch of Ujina.

== Transportation ==
Ujina is situated on the Nuh Hodal highway. A frequent bus service is provided by Haryana Roadways. The nearest airport is the Indira Gandhi International Airport in New Delhi. The nearest railway stations are Palwal railway station (34 km) and Gurgaon railway station (58 km).

== Educational institutions ==
=== Schools ===
- Kalyan Senior Secondary School
- Aditya Army Public School
- Adarsh International School
- Government Girls Senior Secondary School
- Government Boys School
- Geeta Vidya Mandir
- Blue Bird Public School
- S.V.N Coaching and Computer Center

=== Nearby colleges ===
- Government College for women, Salaheri, Nuh
- Yasin Mev Degree College, Nuh
- Mewat Engineering College, Palla, Nuh (Haryana)
- Government College, Nagina
- Modish Polytechnic, Punhana
- Shanti Sagar Jain Girls College, Ferozepur Jhirka
- Government Polytechnic, Uttawar
- Industrial Training Institute, Ujina
- Industrial Training Institute, Nagina
- Industrial Training Institute, Ferozepur Jhirka
- Industrial Training Institute, Nuh
- S.D.Mewat Institute of Technology and Management, Raoli, Ferozepur Jhirka
- Shaheed Hasan Khan Mewati Government Medical college, Nalhar, Nuh

== Nearby cities and towns ==
- Nuh
- Sohna
- Taoru
- Palwal
- Pinangwan
- Gurgaon
- F.P. Jhirka
- Faridabad
- Delhi
- Hodal
- Narnaul
- Hathin
