= Bighoto =

Bighoto was a tract of country starting from Delhi territory, from Rewari on the borders of Mewat to the Bikaner frontier.

== Etymology ==
Bighoto is a tract of country starting from Delhi territory, from Rewari on the borders of Mewat to the Bikaner frontier. Bighoto is a term mainly used by the British. According to Sir Henry Miers Elliot, Bighoto includes Rewari, Bawal, Kanon, Pataudi, Kotkasim, and a great part of the Bahraich Jagir.

== History ==
In the neighborhood of Bighoto existed the territories of Dhundhoti, Rath and Chandain. Bighoto region, established by and named after Bigha Raj Chauhan, was an area of 12 villages including greater part of Taoru that were collectively known as Chandain, remained under the Chand Chauhans, descendants of Sahesh Mal Chauhan. According to Sir Henry Miers Elliot, Bighoto included Rewari, Kot Kasim, Bawal, Kanon, Pataudi, Kotkasim, and a great part of the Bahraich jagir. Sahesh Mal was a son of Raja Sangat Singh Chauhan. Sangat was the great grandson of Chahir Deo Chauhan, brother of famous rajput king Prithviraj Chauhan. A popular saying is Baghoto ko du dhāni Khoro aur Chauhan; "Bighoto has two lords, Khoros(Amongst Ahirs) , and Chauhans."

== See also ==
- Administrative divisions of Haryana
- Ahirwal
- Alwar State
- Bharatpur State
- History of Haryana
- History of Rajasthan
- Mewat
