= Dakshin Haryana Bijli Vitran Nigam =

Electricity transmission and distribution company in Haryana, India

Coordinates: 29°48′27″N 75°48′04″E

Dakshin Haryana Bijli Vitran Nigam (DHBVN)
- दक्षिण हरियाणा बिजली वितरण निगम
- Logo of DHBVN

Electric power distribution overview
- Formed: 1 July 1999
- Preceding agencies: Haryana Vidyut Prasaran Nigam Limited; Haryana State Electricity Board
- Type: Government Owned Corporation
- Jurisdiction: See listing
- Headquarters: Vidyut Sadan, Vidyut Nagar, Hisar, Haryana, India
- Minister responsible: Sh. Manohar Lal Khattar, Chief Minister
- Electric power distribution executives: Sh. Ashok Kumar Garg IAS, Managing Director
- Parent department: Department of Power, Government of Haryana
- Website: dhbvn.org.in

Dakshin Haryana Bijli Vitran Nigam (DHBVN) is an Indian state-owned power distribution utility company. It is owned by Government of Haryana and its headquarter is located in Hisar city of Haryana, India. It has two Operation Zones namely Hisar and Delhi. Each zone is headed by Chief Engineer. Both Zones have Operation circles namely Hisar, Sirsa, Fatehabad, Jind and Bhiwani in Hisar Zone and Gurugram-I, Gurgugram-II, Faridabad, Palwal, Rewari and Narnaul in Delhi Zone. Each circle is headed by Superintending Engineer.

== History ==
In 1998, Haryana State Electricity Board was divided into two parts, namely, Haryana Power Generation Corporation (HPGCL) and Haryana Vidyut Prasaran Nigam (HVPNL). On 1 July 1999, HVPNL was further divided into two parts, namely, Uttar Haryana Bijli Vitran Nigam (UHBVN) and Dakshin Haryana Bijli Vitran Nigam (DHBVN). DHBVN is responsible for distribution of power in South Haryana whether UHBVN is responsible for distribution of power in North Haryana.

== Jurisdiction ==
DHBVN is responsible for distribution of power in the following 12 districts of Haryana:

- Bhiwani
- Faridabad
- Fatehabad
- Gurgaon
- Hisar
- Mewat
- Mahendragarh
- Rewari
- Sirsa
- Jind
- Charkhi Dadri
- Palwal

== See also ==
- Divisions of Haryana
