= Faridabad division =

Coordinates: 28.4211°N 77.3078°E

- Division of Haryana State
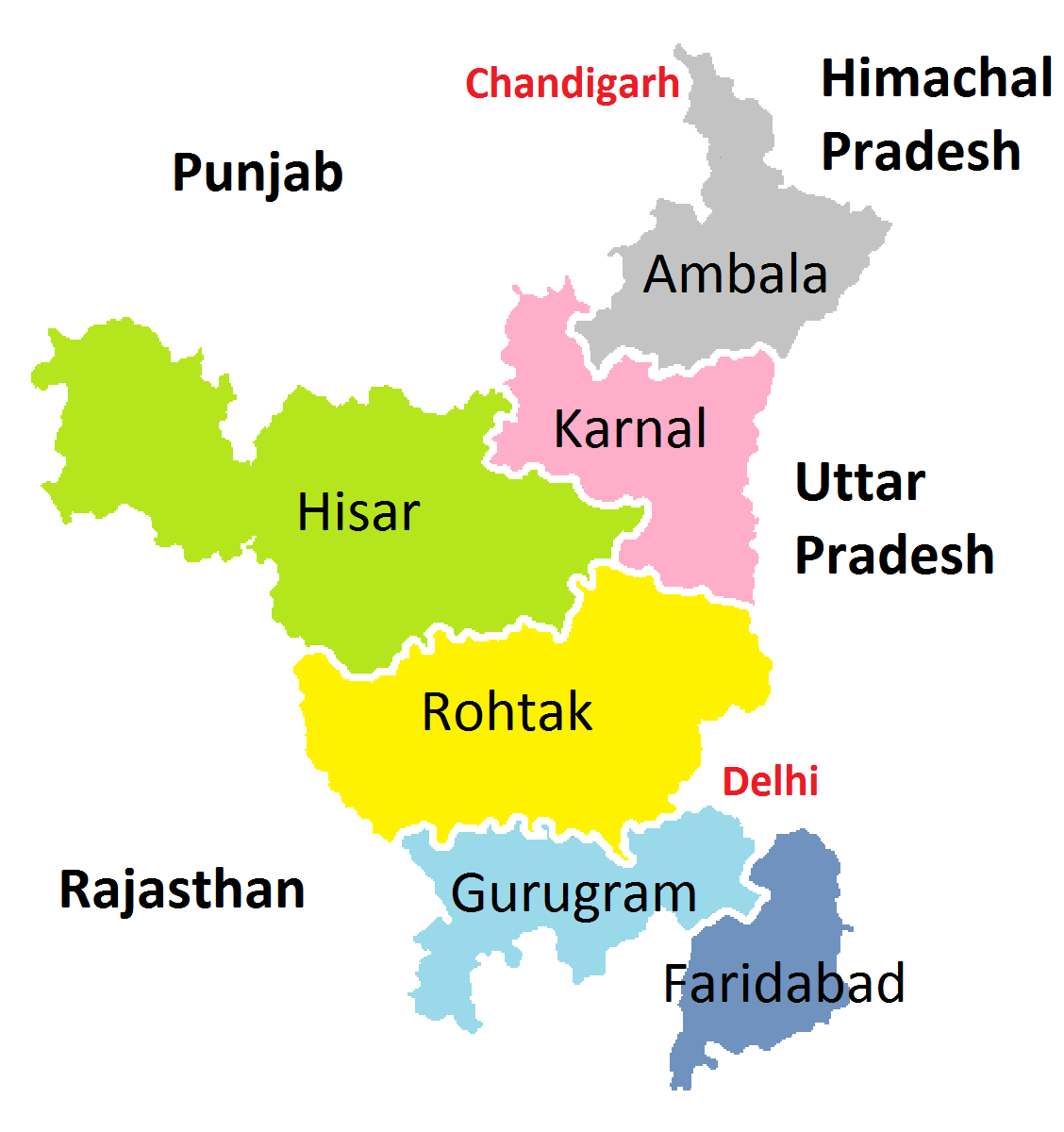
- Faridabad Division in Haryana State
- Country: India
- State: Haryana

Faridabad Division is one of the six divisions of Haryana state of India. It comprises the districts of Faridabad, Palwal and Nuh. It was announced in January 2017 and approved by the Haryana cabinet on 2 February 2017.

== Demography ==
Total population of Faridabad Division is 3,941,704.

Religion in Faridabad Division (2011)
1. Hinduism (66.9%)
2. Islam (31.3%)
3. Others (1.83%)

District	Hindu	Muslim	Other
Faridabad	1,588,407	161,680	59,646
Mewat	221,846	862,647	4,770
Palwal	826,342	208,566	7,800

== See also ==
- Districts of Haryana
- Divisions of Haryana
- Karnal division
