= Karnal division =

Coordinates: 29.69°N 76.98°E

- Division of Haryana State
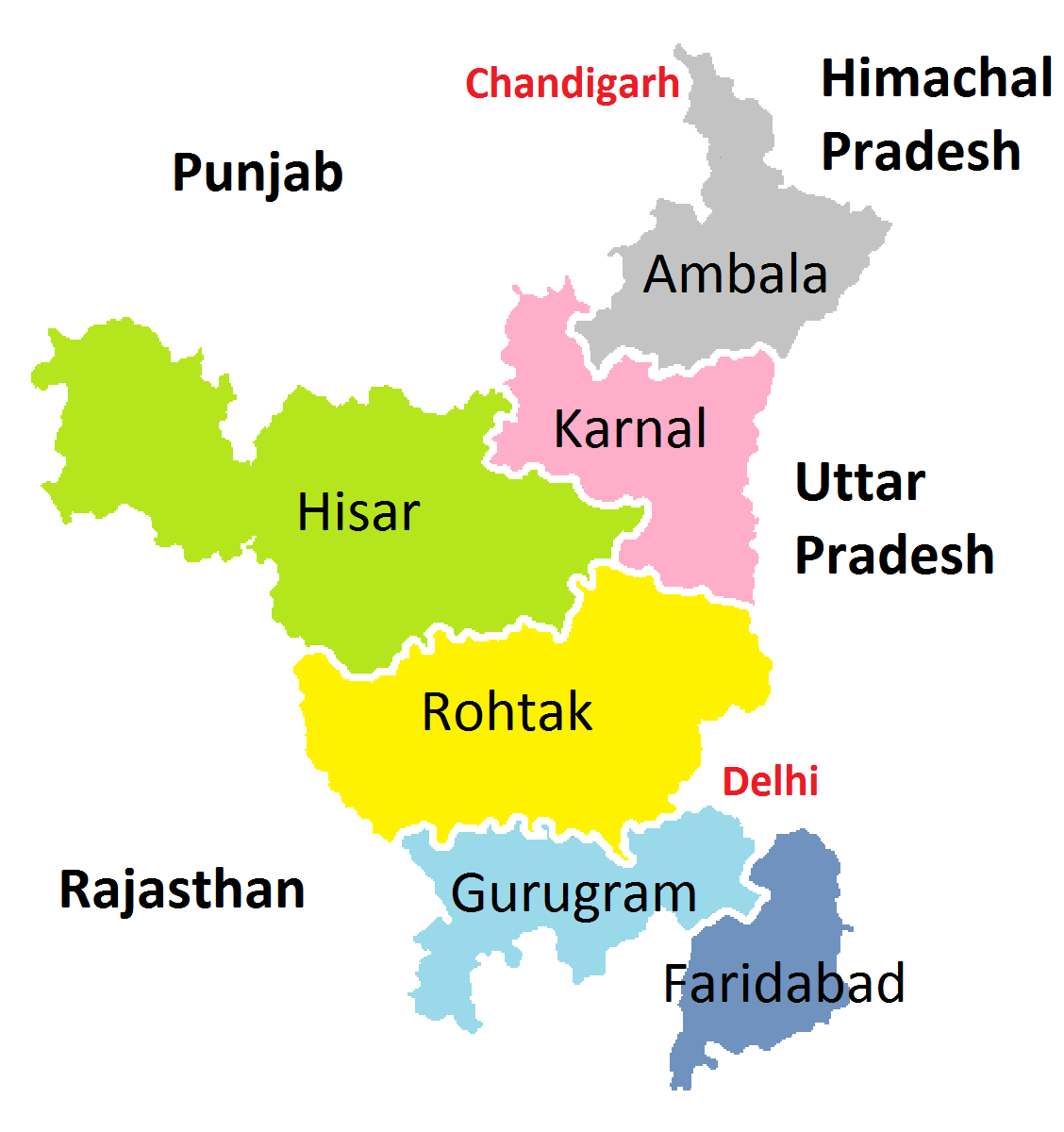
- Karnal Division in Haryana State
- Country: India
- State: Haryana

Karnal Division is one of the six divisions of Haryana, a state of India. It comprises the districts of Karnal, Panipat and Kaithal. It was announced in January 2017 and approved by the Haryana cabinet on 2 February 2017.

== See also ==
- Districts of Haryana
- Divisions of Haryana
- Faridabad division
- Railway in Haryana
