= Dhundhoti =

District in Gurgaon

Dhundhoti in Gurgaon district is the name of the territory which up to late 19th or early 20th century was identified as 60 villages that were a jagir of the Chaudhary of Harsaru. The Chaudhary of Harsaru was hereditarily the senior descendant of Raja Harsh Dev Chauhan, founder of Garhi Harsaru. Harsh Dev was a descendant of famous Hindu Rajput king Prithviraj Chauhan.

The Dhundhoti region is an area of 60 villages in current Gurugram and Nuh districts that were a jagir of Chaudhary of Harsaru who was hereditarily the senior descendant of raja Harsh Dev Chauhan, and remained the titular head of this area. In the neighborhood of Dhundhoti existed the territories of Bighoto, Rath and Chandain that were mostly ruled by the descendants of famous Prithviraj Chauhan.

== See also ==
- Alwar State
- Bharatpur State
- History of Haryana
- History of Rajasthan
- Bighoto region
- Rath region
- Wai region
- Mewat region
- Divisions of Haryana
