= Khoro (clan) =

Khoro is a clan of Ahirs of Haryana in India. Rewari was once ruled by Khoro Ahirs. Dr. Hameeda Khoro is a famous politician of Sindh, Pakistan.

== See also ==
- Ahir clans
