= Uttar Haryana Bijli Vitran Nigam =

Electricity distribution company in Haryana, India

- Industry: Electricity
- Founded: July 1999 in
- Headquarters: Panchkula adjoining Chandigarh, Haryana
- Owner: Government of Haryana
- Website: https://www.uhbvn.org.in/

Uttar Haryana Bijli Vitran Nigam (UHBVN) is the power company responsible for power distribution in North Haryana. UHBVN is owned by Government of Haryana, and began operations in July 1999. Its headquarters is in Panchkula adjoining Chandigarh. This company is headed by the Chief Minister of Haryana. It has two Operation Zones namely Panchkula and Rohtak. Each zone is headed by a chief engineer. Both Zones have five circles each; Ambala, Yamuna Nagar, Kurukshetra, Karnal and, Kaithal in Panchkula Zone and Panipat, Sonipat, Jind, Rohtak and Jhajjar in Rohtak Zone. Each circle is headed by a Superintending Engineer.

== See also ==
- Divisions of Haryana
