= Ambala division =

Coordinates: 30°22′42″N 76°46′51″E

- Division
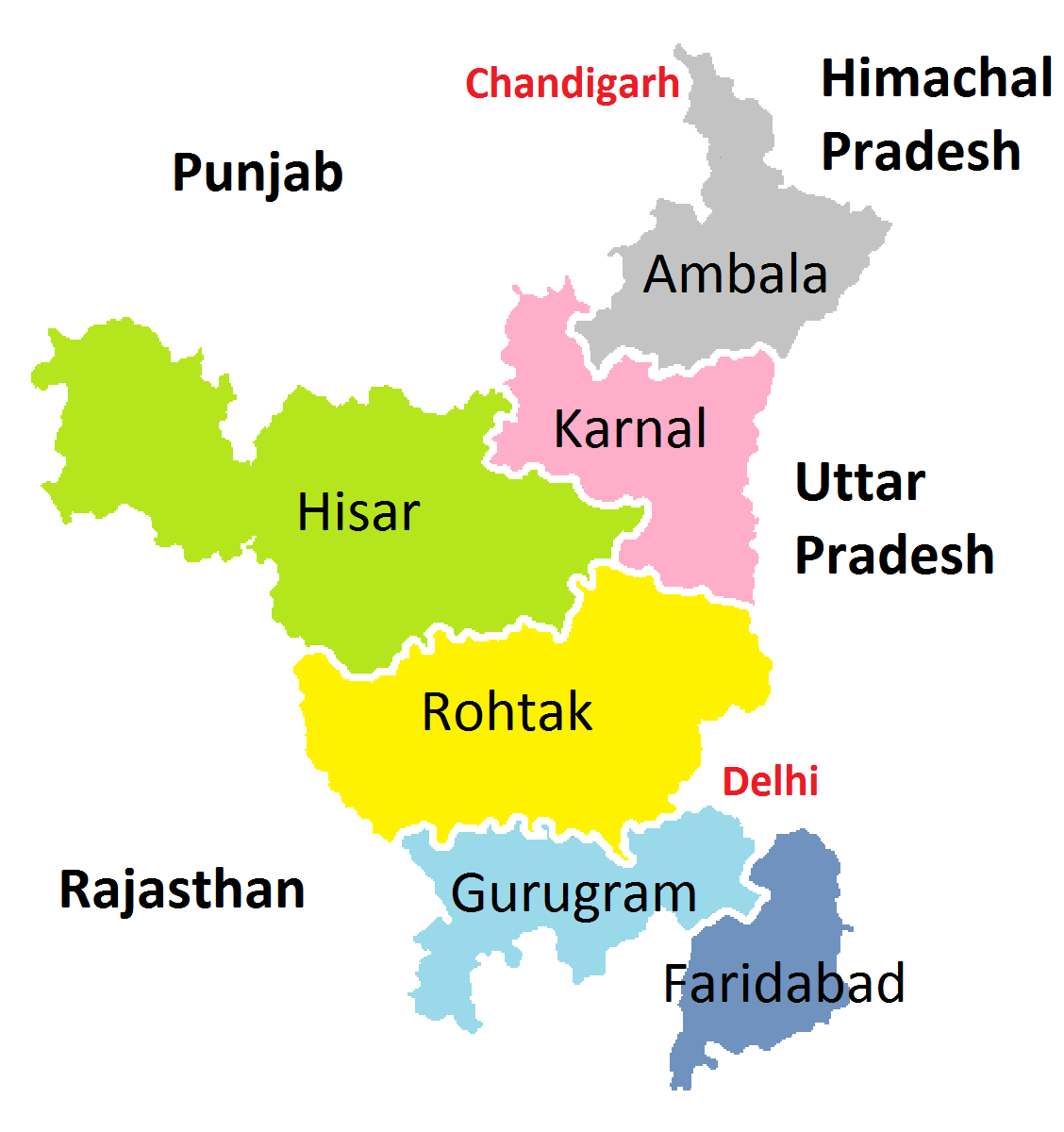
- Ambala Division in Haryana State
- Country: India
- State: Haryana

Ambala Division is one of the six divisions of Haryana State of India. The division comprises the districts of Ambala, Kurukshetra, Panchkula and Yamuna Nagar.

== See also ==
- Districts of Haryana
