= Rohtak division =

Coordinates: 28.9000°N 76.5800°E

- Division of Haryana State
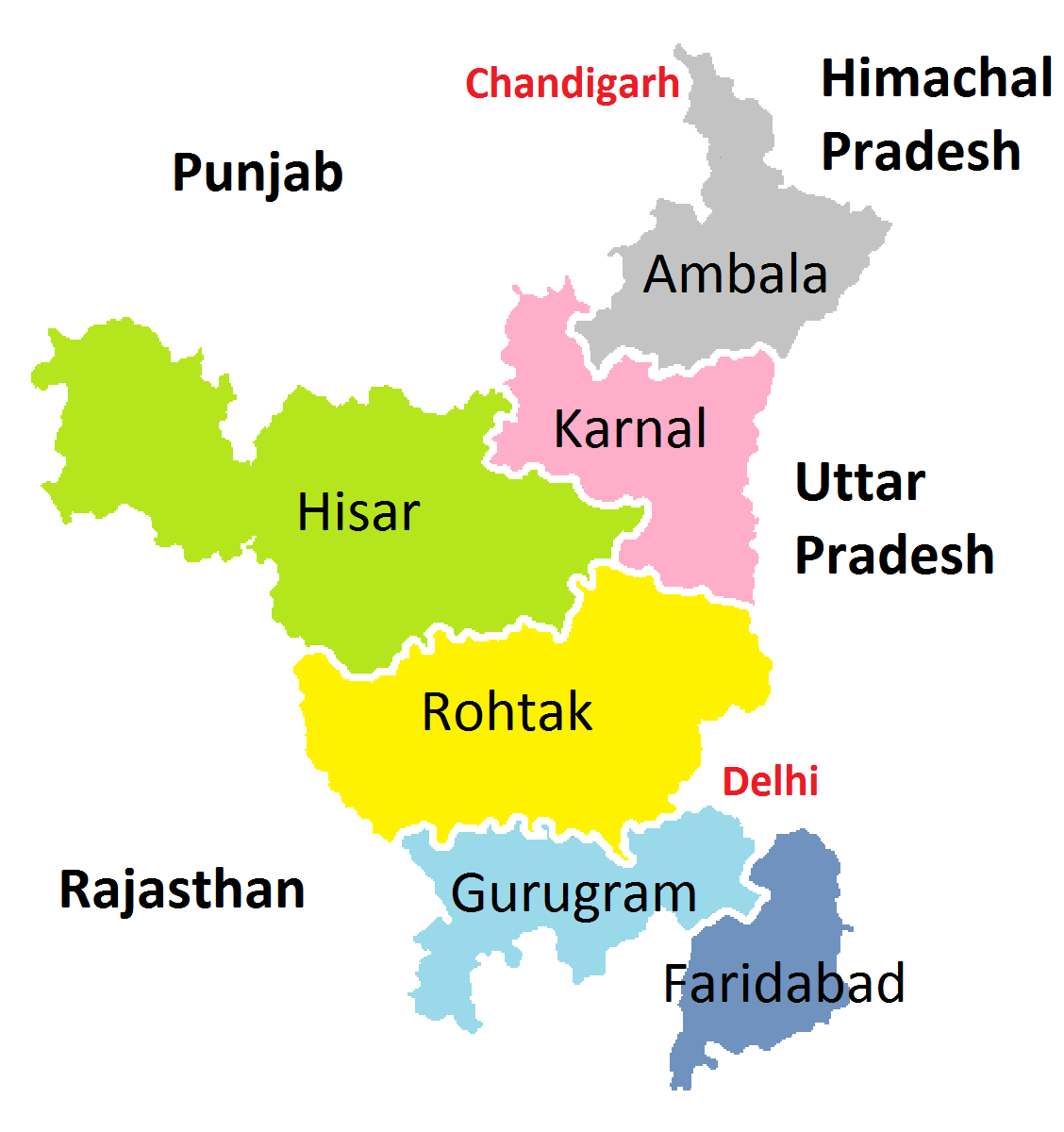
- Rohtak Division in Haryana State
- Country: India
- State: Haryana

Rohtak Division is one of the six divisions of the Indian state of Haryana. It consists of the districts of Jhajjar, Charkhi Dadri, Rohtak and Sonipat.

== See also ==
- Districts of Haryana
