= Palwal railway station =

Railway station in Haryana, India

Palwal
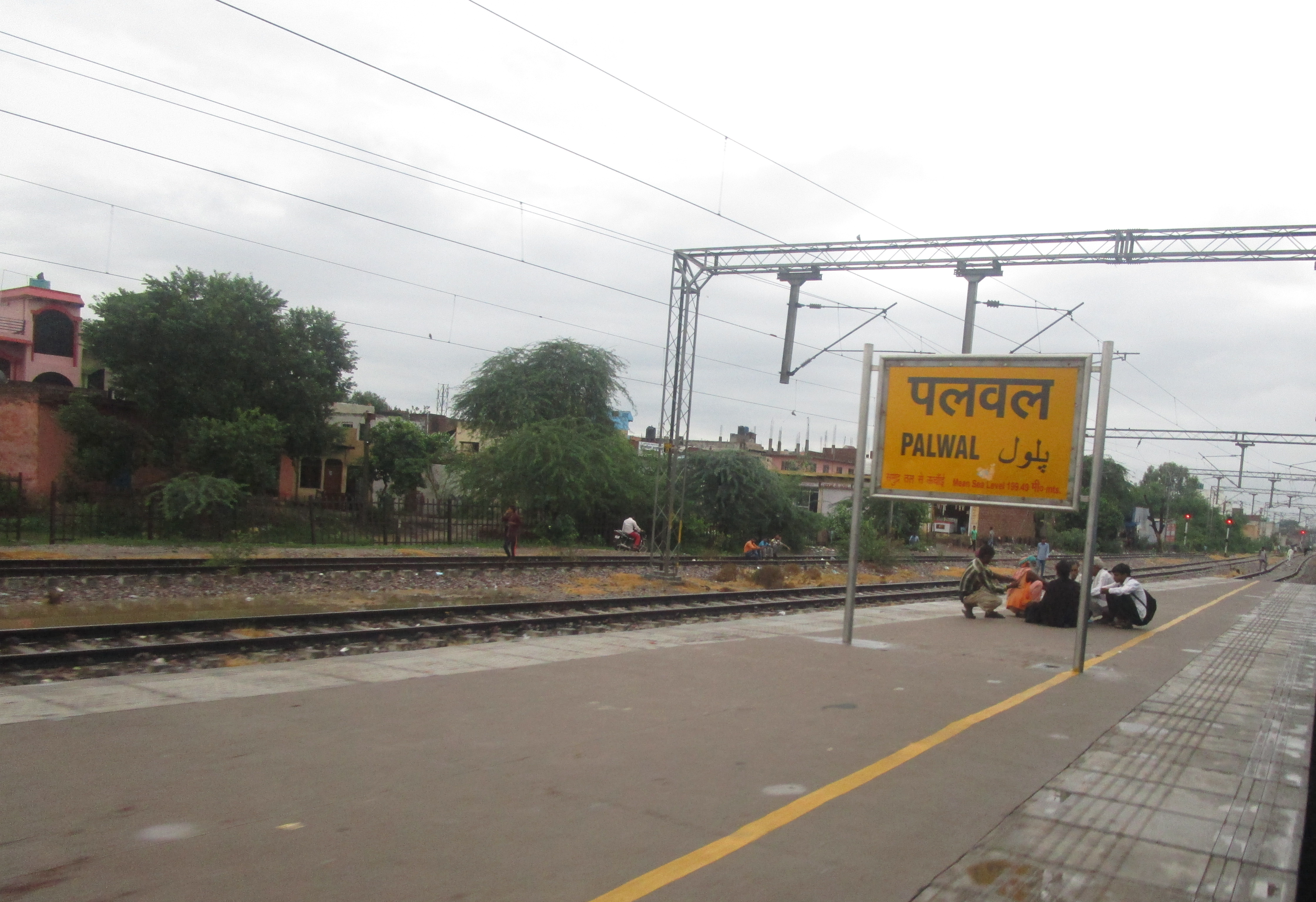
- Palwal railway station

General information
- Location: Palwal, Haryana; India
- Coordinates: 28.1525°N 77.3417°E
- Elevation: 199 m (653 ft)
- System: Indian Railways station
- Owner: Indian Railways
- Operator: Northern Railways
- Lines: New Delhi–Mumbai main line, New Delhi–Palwal–Mathura section
- Platforms: 10 BG
- Tracks: 11 BG
- Connections: Taxi stand, auto stand

Construction
- Structure type: Standard (on-ground station)
- Parking: Available
- Cycle facilities: Available
- Accessible: Available

Other information
- Station code: PWL
- Zone(s): Northern Railway zone
- Division(s): Delhi

Services
Preceding station	Indian Railways	Following station
Asaoti towards ?	Northern Railway zone Agra–Delhi chord	Rundhi towards ?
Location

Palwal railway station (code PWL) is a railway station in Palwal city of Haryana state in India. Station lies on the New Delhi–Howrah main line. City is also known as the "hero city of Haryana".

== History ==
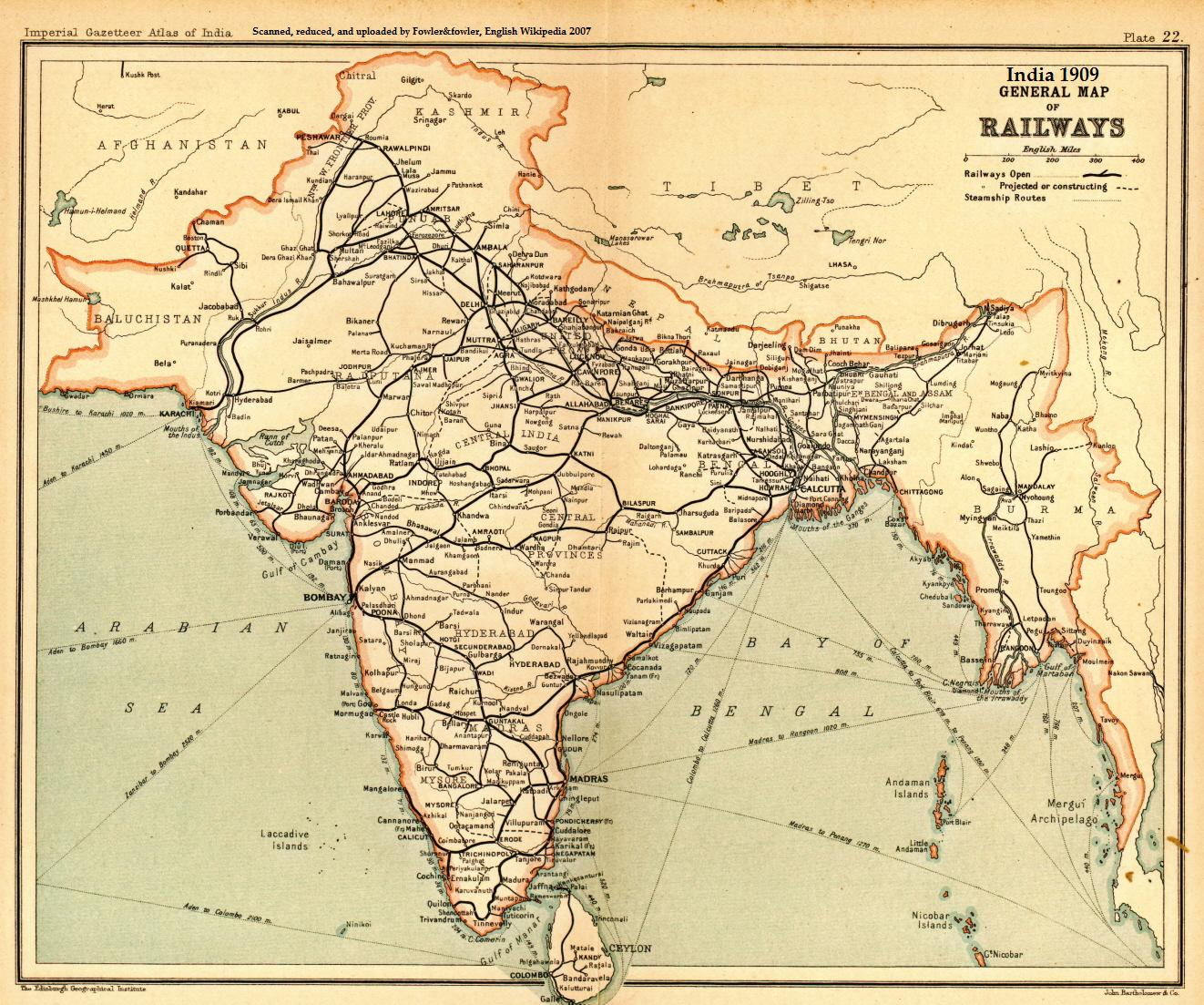
Extent of the Indian railway network in 1909

Mahatma Gandhi was arrested in April 1919 from Palwal railway station on his way to Punjab to take part to the Non-cooperation movement meeting. There also a six-foot statue of Mahatma Gandhi was installed in October 2013.

== Infrastructure ==
The station consists of ten platforms.
