= Carriage & Wagon Workshop, Jagadhari =

- Company type: Public sector undertaking
- Industry: Railways
- Headquarters: Yamunanagar, Haryana India
- Area served: India
- Services: Passenger railways Freight services Parcel carrier Catering and Tourism Services; Parking lot operations Other related services
- Owner: Government of India (100%)
- Parent: Ministry of Railways through Railway Board (India)
- Divisions: Northern Railway zone
- Website: indianrailways.gov.in

Carriage & Wagon Workshop, Jagadhari is in Yamunanagar district of Haryana. It is among the eight workshops operated by Northern Railways.

== History ==
This workshop, earlier known as Wagon Workshop was established by the Northern Railway at Jagadhri, Haryana, in 1952, to carry out the periodical overhauling (POH) of rolling stock, both goods and coaching types.
