= South Haryana =

- Part (South Haryana)
- Location in Haryana, India South Haryana (India)
- Coordinates: 28.25°N 76.29°E
- Country: India
- State: Haryana

Languages
  - Official: Hindi
- Time zone: UTC+5:30 (IST)
- Vehicle registration: HR
- No. of districts: Bhiwani, Mahendragarh at Narnaul, Rewari
- Website: haryana.gov.in

South Haryana is an underdeveloped region of the Indian state of Haryana. South Haryana has dearth of essentials i.e. water (Bhakra water), road, transport and protracted demand of University and educational institutes.

== Important quotes on South Haryana ==
- "Non equitable distribution of funds by the government and it has ignored Southern Haryana, Ex- Union Minister of State for External Affairs during the previous tenure of Prime Minister Manmohan Singh."
- "South Haryana cries foul over ‘new university’."

== Adjacent districts ==
- Rewari
- Gurgaon
- Nuh

== Adjacent Towns ==
- Bawal
- Dadri
- Rewari

== See also ==
- Indira Gandhi Mirpur University, Rewari
