= Hisar division =

- Division of Haryana State
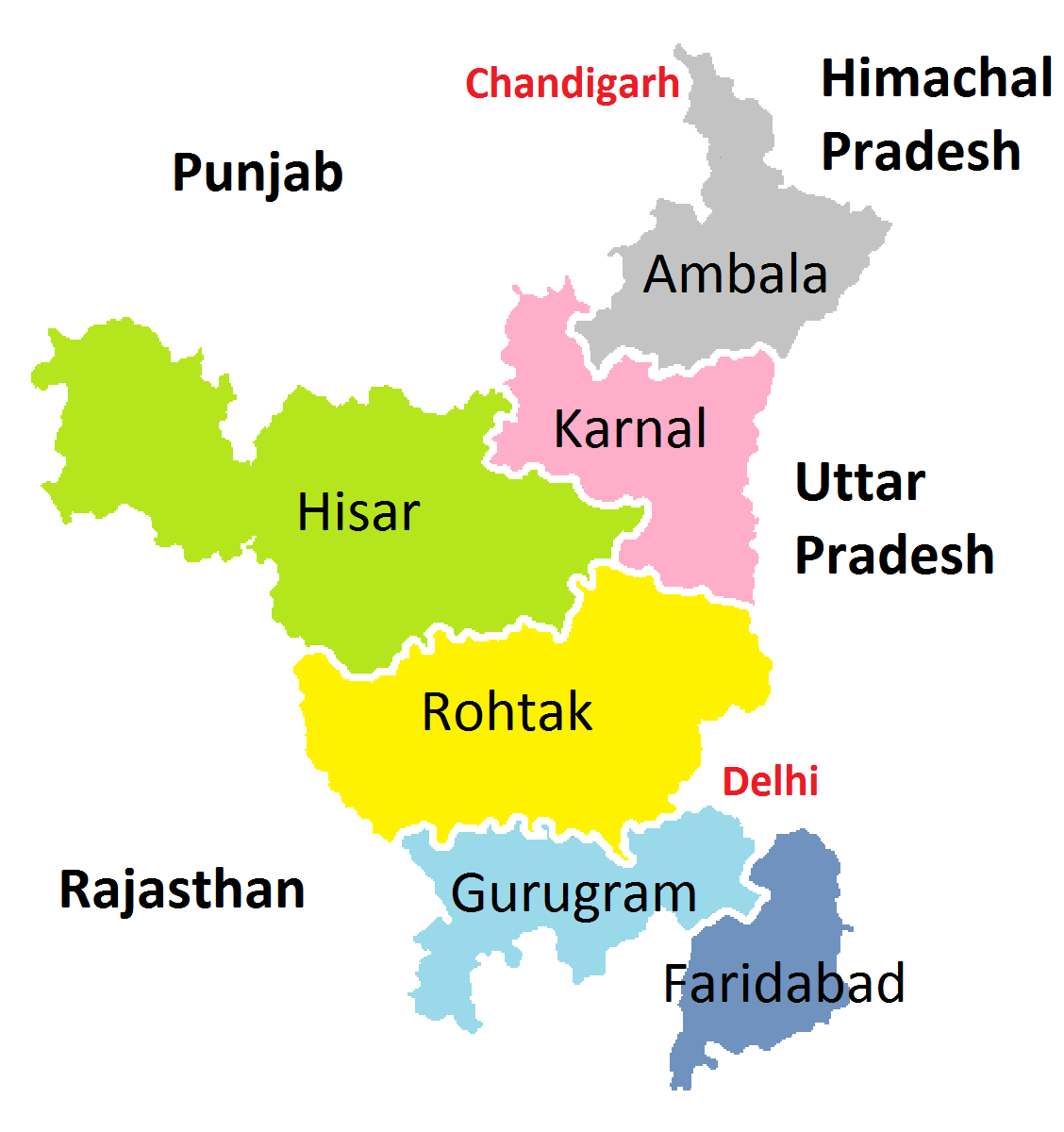
- Hisar Division in Haryana State
- Country: India
- State: Haryana

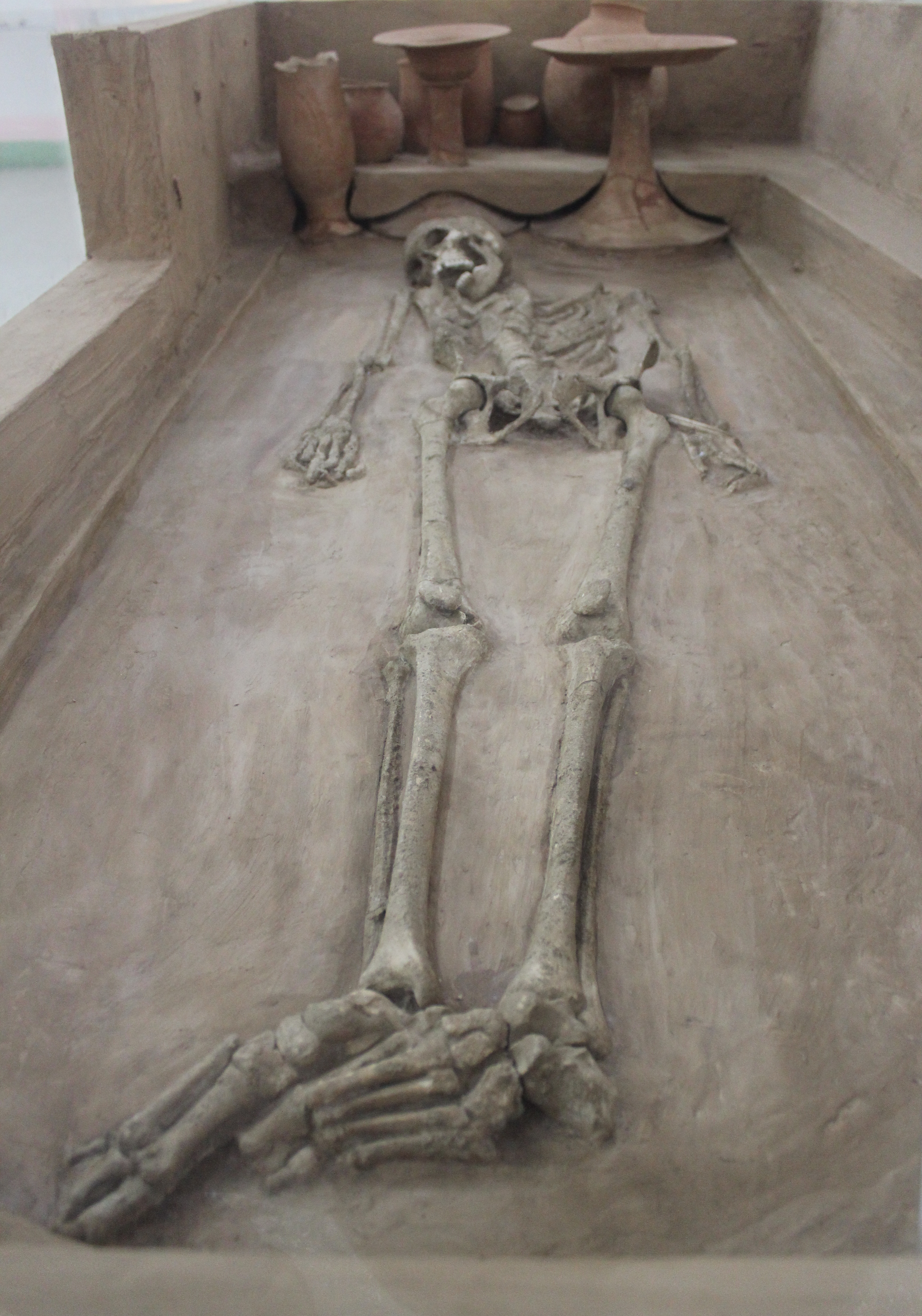
A skeleton from Rakhigarhi Indus Valley Civilisation site in Hisar on display in the National Museum, New Delhi

Hisar Division is one of the six divisions of Haryana State of India. The division comprises the districts of Fatehabad, Hisar, Jind and Sirsa .

It is named after the Hisar (city) that was a fort in the late 10th century. The office of the Commissioner of Hisar division is situated in Hisar city.

== See also ==
- Hisar (city)
- Hisar Urban Agglomeration
- Hisar district
- Hisar (Vidhan Sabha constituency)
- Hisar (Lok Sabha constituency)
- Districts of Haryana
