= List of districts of Haryana =

Map of districts of Haryana grouped by division

Haryana, with 23 districts, is a state in the northern region of India and is the nation's eighteenth most populous. The state borders with Punjab and Himachal Pradesh to the north and Rajasthan to the west and south. The river Yamuna defines its eastern border with Uttar Pradesh. Haryana also surrounds Delhi on three sides, forming the northern, western and southern borders of Delhi. Consequently, a large area of Haryana is included in the National Capital Region. Chandigarh is the capital of Punjab and Haryana jointly.

== History ==
On 1 November 1966 (Tuesday) Haryana was constituted as a separate state with seven districts, according to the partition plan of the then East Punjab. The seven districts were Rohtak, Jind, Hisar, Mahendragarh, Gurgaon, Karnal, Ambala. The partition was based on the linguistic demographics and was held after the recommendation of Sardar Hukam Singh—the then Speaker of the Lok Sabha—Parliamentary Committee. A further 15 districts were added later by re-organizing the erstwhile districts. The First Chief minister of Haryana was Pt. Bhagwat Dayal Sharma.

In 2016, Charkhi Dadri district was carved out of the larger Bhiwani.

District by date of bifurcation/formation
1 November 1966	22 December 1972	23 January 1973	1 September 1975	15 August 1979	1 November 1989	15 August 1995	15 July 1997	4 April 2005	15 August 2008	1 December 2016	16 December 2025
Rohtak	Rohtak						Rohtak				
Rohtak	Rohtak						Jhajjar				
Rohtak	Sonipat										
Jind
Hisar	Hisar		Hisar				Hisar				Hisar
Hisar	Hisar		Hisar				Hisar				Hansi
Hisar	Hisar		Hisar				Fatehabad				
Hisar	Hisar		Sirsa								
Hisar	Bhiwani									Bhiwani	
Hisar	Bhiwani									Charkhi Dadri	
Mahendragarh					Mahendragarh						
Mahendragarh					Rewari						
Gurgaon				Gurgaon	Rewari						
Gurgaon				Gurgaon	Gurgaon			Gurgaon			
Gurgaon				Gurgaon	Gurgaon			Nuh	Nuh		
Gurgaon				Faridabad				Nuh	Palwal		
Gurgaon				Faridabad				Faridabad	Palwal		
Gurgaon				Faridabad				Faridabad			
Karnal		Karnal			Karnal						
Karnal		Karnal			Panipat						
Karnal		Kurukshetra			Kurukshetra						
Karnal		Kurukshetra			Kaithal						
Ambala					Ambala	Ambala					
Ambala					Ambala	Panchkula					
Ambala					Yamunanagar						

== Administration ==
A district of Haryana state is an administrative geographical unit, headed by a Deputy Commissioner (DC), an officer belonging to the Indian Administrative Service (IAS). The Deputy Commissioner also functions as the District Magistrate (DM) and Collector of the district. The deputy commissioner is assisted by a number of officers belonging to Haryana Civil Service and other state services. The Deputy Commissioner is the head of district administration, and responsible for land revenue administration, disaster management, election, maintenance of law and order, co-ordination of other departments in the district.

A Superintendent of Police (SP), an officer belonging to the Indian Police Service is entrusted with the responsibility of maintaining law and order and related issues of the district. He is assisted by the officers of the Haryana Police Service and other Haryana Police officials.

A Deputy Conservator of Forests (DCF), an officer belonging to the Indian Forest Service is responsible for managing the Forests, environment and wild-life related issues of the district. He is assisted by the officers of the Haryana Forest Service and other Haryana Forest officials and Haryana Wild-Life officials.

Sectoral development is looked after by the district head of each development department such as PWD, Health, Education, Agriculture, Animal husbandry, Social Welfare, Irrigation, Rural Development, etc. These officers belong to the various State Services.

== List of Districts ==
The Government of Haryana has divided Haryana state in the following 23 districts:

Sr. No.	District	Code	Headquarters	Division	Established	Area (in km^{2})	Population (2011 Census estimates)	Highlighted Map
1.	Ambala	AM	Ambala	Ambala	1 November 1966	1,574	1,136,784	
2.	Kurukshetra	KU	Kurukshetra	Ambala	23 January 1973	1,530	964,231	
3.	Panchkula	PK	Panchkula	Ambala	15 August 1995	898	558,890	
4.	Yamunanagar	YN	Yamunanagar	Ambala	1 November 1989	1,768	1,214,162	
5.	Faridabad	FR	Faridabad	Faridabad	15 August 1979	742	1,798,954	
6.	Nuh	NH	Nuh	Faridabad	4 April 2005	1,874	1,089,406	
7.	Palwal	PL	Palwal	Faridabad	15 August 2008	1,359	1,040,493	
8.	Gurugram	GU	Gurugram	Gurugram	1 November 1966	1,253	1,514,085	
9.	Mahendragarh	MH	Narnaul	Gurugram	1 November 1966	1,859	921,680	
10.	Rewari	RE	Rewari	Gurugram	1 November 1989	1,582	896,129	
11.	Hisar	HI	Hisar	Hisar	1 November 1966	2,633	1,112,815	
12.	Fatehabad	FT	Fatehabad	Hisar	15 July 1997	2,538	941,522	
13.	Hansi	HN	Hansi	Hisar	16 Dec 2025	1,350	5,27650	
14.	Jind	JI	Jind	Hisar	1 November 1966	2,702	1,332,042	
15.	Sirsa	SI	Sirsa	Hisar	1 September 1975	4,277	1,295,114	
16.	Karnal	KR	Karnal	Karnal	1 November 1966	2,520	1,506,323	
17.	Kaithal	KT	Kaithal	Karnal	1 November 1989	2,317	1,072,861	
18.	Panipat	PP	Panipat	Karnal	1 November 1989	1,268	1,202,811	
19.	Rohtak	RO	Rohtak	Rohtak	1 November 1966	1,745	1,058,683	
20.	Bhiwani	BH	Bhiwani	Rohtak	22 December 1972	3,432	1,126,833	
21.	Charkhi Dadri	CD	Charkhi Dadri	Rohtak	1 December 2016	1370	502,276	
22.	Jhajjar	JH	Jhajjar	Rohtak	15 July 1997	1,834	956,907	
23.	Sonipat	SO	Sonipat	Rohtak	22 December 1972	2,122	1,480,080	

== Proposals for new districts ==
Several sub-divisions and local committees in Haryana have proposed the creation of new administrative districts. These demands are primarily driven by rapid urbanization, significant population growth in commercial and industrial hubs, long travel distances to current district headquarters, and the need for decentralized public service delivery.

List of Proposed Districts in Haryana Grouped by Current District
Proposed District	Expected Area of Jurisdiction	Rationale for Creation
Proposed from Ambala
Naraingarh	Naraingarh sub-division in eastern Ambala district.	Proposed to improve administrative accessibility for the remote sub-mountainous tracts near the Himachal Pradesh border.
Proposed from Bhiwani
Loharu	Loharu sub-division in southwestern Bhiwani district.	Demanded due to its significant distance from the main district headquarters and its position bordering Rajasthan, requiring localized border area administration.
Proposed from Fatehabad
Tohana	Tohana sub-division in eastern Fatehabad district.	Proposed to upgrade the prominent agricultural, industrial, and railway junction into a separate administrative unit to streamline public service delivery.
Proposed from Gurugram
Manesar	Manesar sub-division and Industrial Model Township (IMT) area.	Proposed to separate the high-density industrial, corporate, and residential infrastructure of the Manesar mega-hub from Gurugram's primary urban administration.
Pataudi	Pataudi sub-division in western Gurugram district.	Sought to optimize local governance and focus on the developing semi-urban and agrarian blocks separate from the corporate district core.
Proposed from Hisar
Barwala	Barwala sub-division in northern Hisar district.	Demanded to reduce travel distances and bring public utility services closer to the rural populations of the northern blocks.
Proposed from Jind
Narwana	Narwana sub-division in northern Jind district.	A long-standing demand aimed at providing focused administrative resources and developmental infrastructure to the northern region.
Safidon	Safidon sub-division in eastern Jind district.	Proposed to establish localized administrative channels for the eastern agrarian blocks bordering Panipat and Karnal districts.
Proposed from Karnal
Asandh	Assandh sub-division in southwestern Karnal district.	Proposed to reduce travel times to Karnal city and streamline regional governance on the southwestern periphery of the district.
Proposed from Kurukshetra
Pehowa	Pehowa sub-division in western Kurukshetra district.	Demanded to independently manage regional tourism, pilgrimage traffic, and localized agrarian administration.
Proposed from Mahendragarh
Narnaul	Narnaul sub-division.	While Narnaul currently functions as the administrative headquarters for Mahendragarh district, local representations seek a structural division or explicit status adjustment to balance infrastructure development with Mahendragarh town.
Proposed from Nuh
Ferozepur Jhirka	Ferozepur Jhirka sub-division in southern Nuh district.	Proposed to enhance infrastructure, administrative outreach, and public utility allocation in the southernmost border region adjacent to Rajasthan.
Proposed from Sirsa
Dabwali	Dabwali sub-division in western Sirsa district.	Proposed to address the geographical expanse of Sirsa and to improve law enforcement and interstate transit management along the Punjab and Rajasthan borders.
Proposed from Sonipat
Gohana	Gohana sub-division in western Sonipat district.	Demanded to establish a dedicated district command for the heavily populated western agrarian blocks, bringing local administration closer to the farming networks.

== See also ==
- List of tehsils of Haryana
- Administrative divisions of Haryana
