= New Delhi–Jaipur main line =

Railway line in India

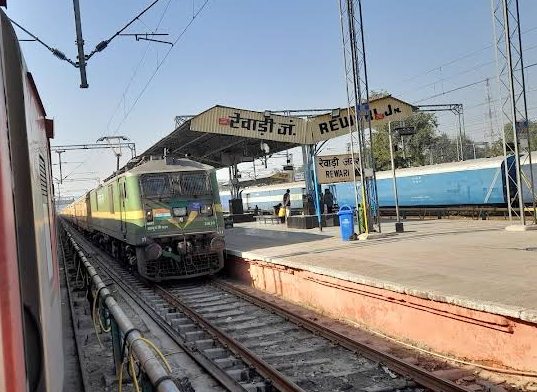
- Rewari Junction railway station an important railway station on New Delhi–Jaipur main line

Overview
- Status: Operational
- Owner: Indian Railways
- Locale: Delhi, Haryana, Rajasthan
- Termini: Old Delhi, New Delhi, Delhi Sarai Rohilla; Jaipur

Service
- Operator(s): Northern Railway, North Western Railway

History
- Opened: 1875

Technical
- Track length: 305 km (190 mi)
- Track gauge: 1,676 mm (5 ft 6 in) broad gauge
- Electrification: Yes
- Operating speed: upto 130 km/h between Rewari Junction and Jaipur
- Highest elevation: Delhi 239 m (784 ft), Jaipur 428 m (1,404 ft)

The New Delhi–Jaipur main line connects New Delhi, the capital of India with Jaipur, the capital of Rajasthan. Further it is linked with the Jaipur–Ahmedabad main line and the Mumbai–Ahmedabad main line.

There are about 30 trains connecting Delhi to Jaipur, fastest one, CDG – AII Vande Bharat taking 3 hours 32 minutes. and ADI – SJ Rajdhani taking 3 hours 50 minutes.

The route also faces delays in normal running during winter period because of fog. Throughout the route, there are two parallel railway lines running, helping in swift movement of trains without any delays.

== History ==
Rajputana State Railway opened the Delhi–Bandikui 1,000 mm (3 ft 3 3/8 in)-wide metre-gauge line in 1874, extended it to Ajmer in 1875 and to Ahmedabad in 1881.

The Delhi–Ajmer line was converted to 1,676 mm (5 ft 6 in)-wide broad gauge in 1994. The Ajmer-Ahmedabad line was converted to 1,676 mm (5 ft 6 in)-wide broad gauge in 1997.

== Passenger movement ==
Jaipur, on this line, is the only railway station which is amongst the top hundred booking stations of Indian Railways.
