= Palwal =

- City
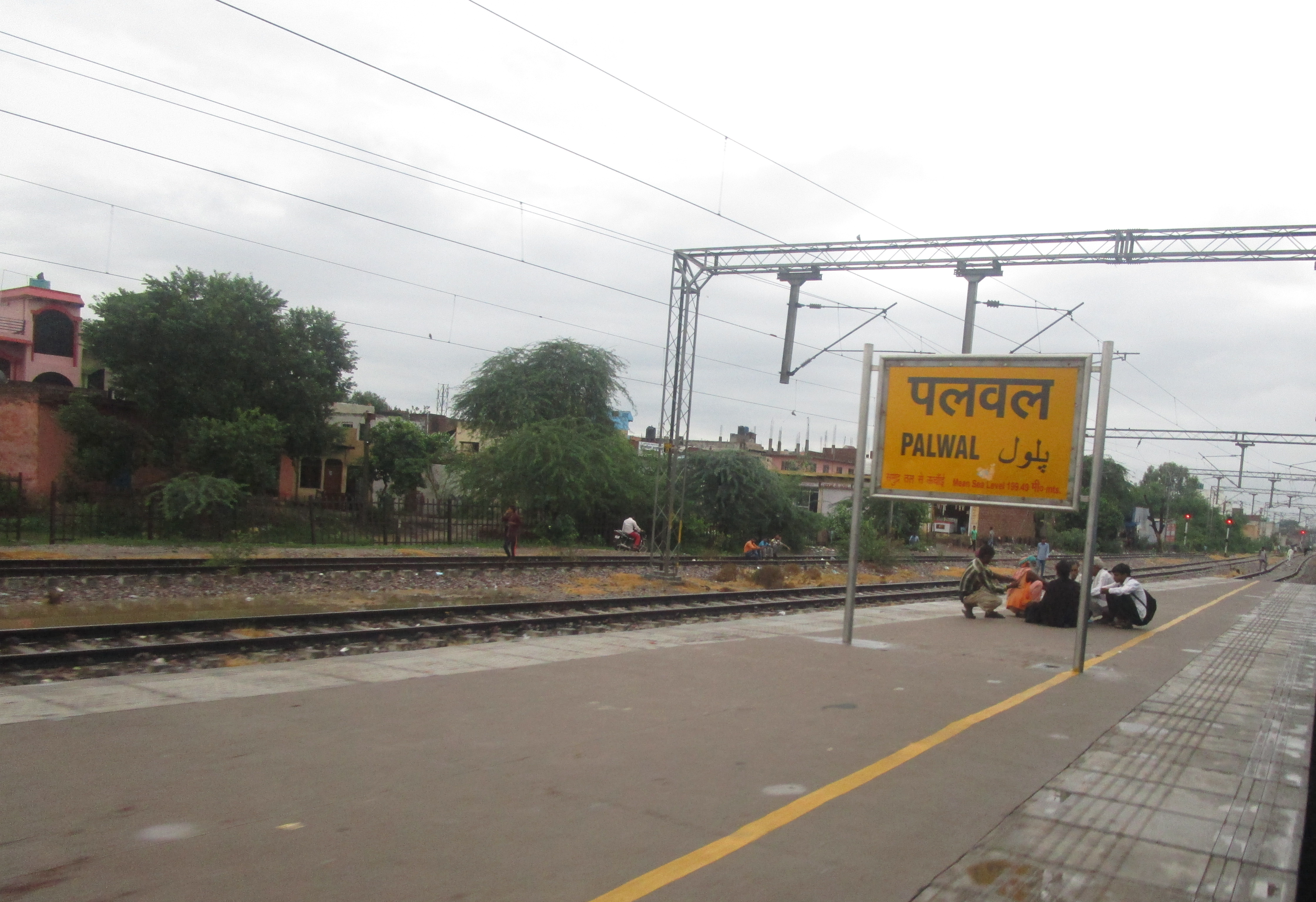
- Palwal railway station in Palwal, Haryana

- Location in Haryana, India Palwal (India)
- Coordinates: 28.143°N 77.329°E
- Country: India
- State: Haryana
- District: Palwal
- Elevation: 199.49 m (654.5 ft)

Population (2011)
  - Total: 131,926

Language
  - Official: Hindi, Regional Braj Bhasha, Haryanvi
- Time zone: UTC+5:30 (IST)
- PIN: 121102
- Telephone code: 01275
- ISO 3166 code: IN-HR
- Vehicle registration: HR-30
- Sex ratio: 879 ♂/♀
- Website: palwal.gov.in

Palwal is a city and a municipal council. It is the headquarters of Palwal district, the 21st district of Haryana state in northern India. It is a centre of the cotton trade in the area. It is part of Braj region. It is also a part of National Capital Region.

== Etymology and legend ==
The origin of Palwal is related to the local legend related to the Mahabharata, according to which the town is named after an asura called "Palwasura" who was slain by Balarama, the brother of Krishna. To commemorate this event an annual festival called "Baldev Chhat Ka Mela" is held here, and a "Dauji temple" in honor of Balrama is situated in Banchari village 25 km from Palwal on Grand Trunk Road.

== History ==
The local tradition identifies Palwal with the Apelava town mentioned in the Mahabharata, which was later restored by Vikramaditya.

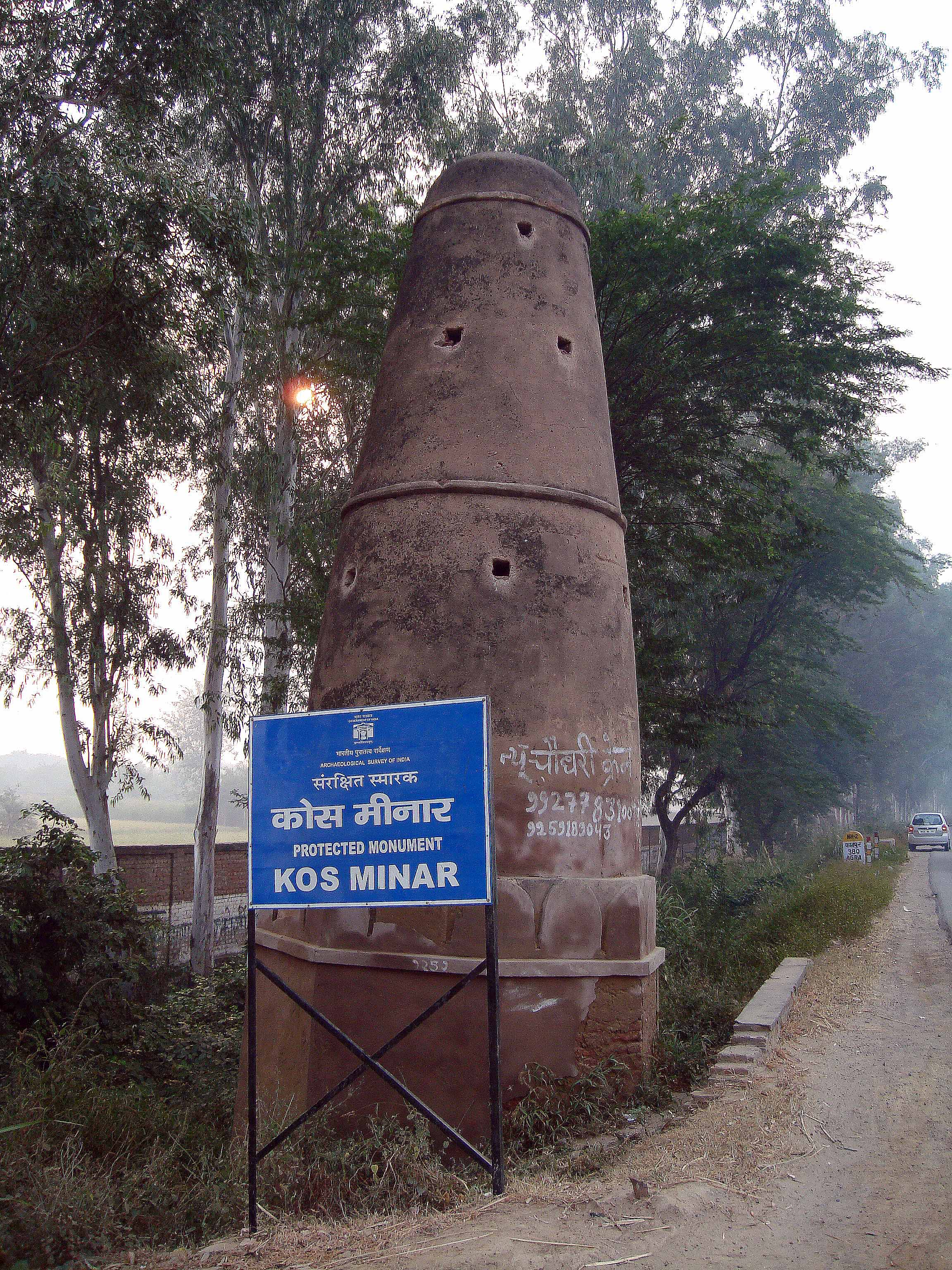
Kos Minar at Palwal along Grand Trunk Road

Matia Fort or Palwal Fort was built during Sher Shah Suri's reign. Excavations have unearthed evidence of a grand palace at the bottom of the fort. As of 2021, it lies in ruins.

A historical building by the name 'Gandhi Seva Ashram' and a Museum was made in the memory of Mahatma Gandhi. The Gandhi Museum is close to Palwal Railway Station. Mahatma Gandhi was arrested on 10 April 1919 at Palwal railway station while going to Punjab against the Rowlatt Act. Keeping this memory alive lasting on October 2, 1938, Netaji Subhas Chandra Bose had kept it. Gandhi exhibition was established in Gandhi Seva Ashram in the year 1962. In it, history related to Gandhiji was preserved. Pictures for the exhibition were brought from the National Gandhi Museum of Delhi. Later, they started getting damaged, they were upgraded and the exhibition site was changed to the museum.

=== Post-independence ===
On 15 August 1979, Gurgaon district was further divided to form a new Faridabad district, and Palwal became a part of it. On 15 August 2008, Palwal became the administrative headquarters of the newly formed Palwal district, the 21st district of Haryana.

== Geography ==
Palwal is located at 28.12°N 77.33°E. It has an average elevation of 195 metres (640 ft).

Palwal is 60 kilometres (37 mi) from Delhi, 29 kilometres (18 mi) from Faridabad, 314 kilometres (195 mi) from Chandigarh and 143 kilometres (89 mi) from Agra.The latitude of the town is 28° 40' N and longitude is 76° 59' E. The area of town is 22.10 square kilometres (8.53 mi^{2}).

== Demography ==
Religion in Palwal City
Religion	Population (1911)	Percentage (1911)	Population (1941)	Percentage (1941)
Hinduism (Note: 1941 census: Including Ad-Dharmis)	6,061	64.08%	8,831	64.91%
Islam	3,280	34.68%	4,404	32.37%
Christianity	53	0.56%	244	1.79%
Sikhism	1	0.01%	30	0.22%
Others (Note: Including Jainism, Buddhism, Zoroastrianism, Judaism, others, or not stated)	63	0.67%	97	0.71%
Total Population	9,458	100%	13,606	100%

== See also ==
- Administrative divisions of Haryana
