= Security and Growth for All in the Region =

Indian geopolitical backronym

SAGAR, acronym for Security and Growth for All in the Region, is a label used by the Prime Minister and Government of India for India's vision and geopolitical framework of maritime cooperation in the Indian Ocean region. Sagar means 'ocean' or 'sea' in multiple Indian languages. (Note: Such as Hindi, Bengali, Kannada, Marathi, Punjabi, and Gujarti. (also in Sinhala)) Since the first usage of the phrase in 2015 at Port Louis by Prime Minister Narendra Modi the term has been adapted to include more elements such as linkages with the Indo-Pacific region.

== Vocal explication ==
On 12 March 2015 the Prime Minister of India had first taken reference to SAGAR in an address in Mauritius. PM Modi said, "Our goal is to seek a climate of trust and transparency; respect for international maritime rules and norms by all countries; sensitivity to each other`s interests; peaceful resolution of maritime issues; and increase in maritime cooperation". The address was during the commissioning of the Kora-class corvette MCGS Barracuda into the National Coast Guard of Mauritius, the first Indian manufactured warship to be exported.

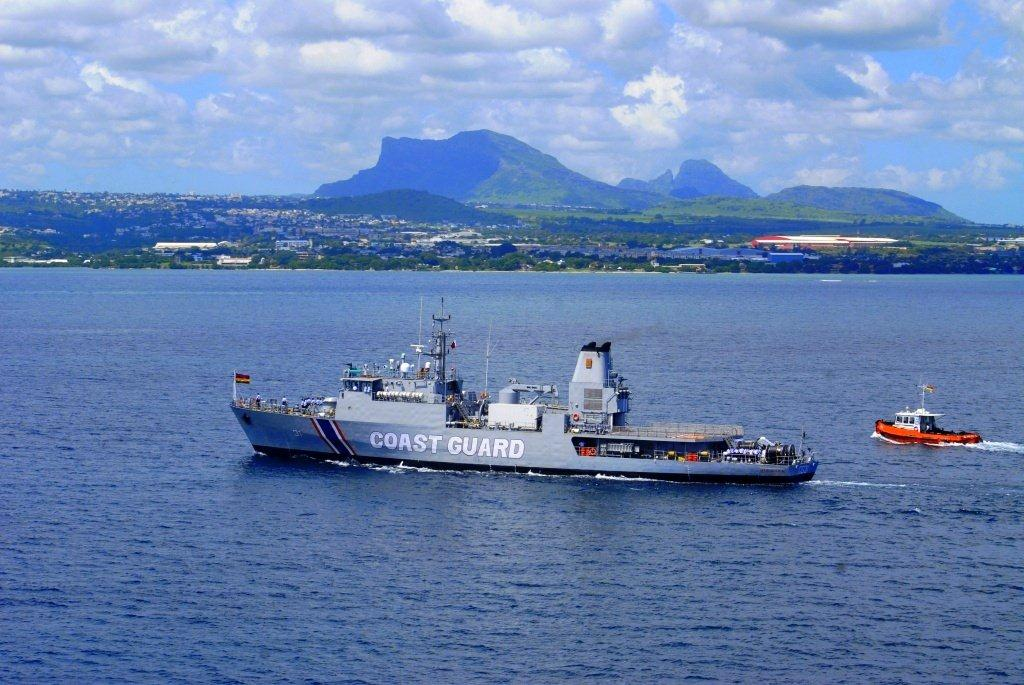
Kora-class corvette MCGS Barracuda, the first warship to be exported from an Indian shipyard, commissioned on 12 March 2015

This was followed by the External Affairs Minister referencing SAGAR in two addresses at the Indian Ocean Conference and elaborating on its implementation. India has not officially released a report or document outlining the vision and doctrine. This is not unique to SAGAR, as even the "Ten Principles of India-Africa Cooperation" was mentioned in speeches but not promulgated on paper officially. However, substantial initiatives have been taken which fall within the basic elements of SAGAR. In June 2019 Prime Minister Modi in the Maldivian Parliament referenced the doctrine as a "blueprint for cooperation".

In November 2020 the Foreign Secretary said "India's Indo-Pacific strategy was enunciated by Prime Minister Narendra Modi in a speech in Singapore in 2018 as the SAGAR doctrine". This extension of the Indian Ocean strategy further east to the Indo-Pacific first took place when the Prime Minister had said during the 2018 Shangri-La Dialogue, "Three years ago, in Mauritius, I described our vision in one word – Sagar, which means ocean in Hindi. And, Sagar stands for Security and Growth for All in the Region and, that is the creed we follow to our East now even more vigorously through our Act East Policy". Prime Minister Modi referenced SAGAR during his chair of a United Nations Security Council (UNSC) high-level open debate on maritime security in August 2021.

== Initiatives falling within SAGAR ==
SAGAR involves increasing maritime domain awareness. This is implemented through the Integrated Coastal Surveillance System. Coastal radar systems have been sponsored in a number of Indian Ocean region countries including the Maldives. With Sri Lanka a number of bilateral and trilateral projects, with Japan, have started. In 2018, Indonesia and India signed a strategic agreement for maritime cooperation, the "Shared Vision of India-Indonesia Maritime Cooperation in the Indo-Pacific". Without any specific hierarchy, related projects include Sagarmala and Project Mausam, and strategies of 'neighbourhood first' and of India being a 'net security provider'. India-Seychelles relations include onshore projects, and the handing over of equipment to the Seychelles Coast Guard. Patrol vessels have also been given to Mauritius and Maldives.

As part of SAGAR the Indian government, the Indian Navy and Indian Coast Guard have assisted countries in the Indian Ocean region with exclusive economic zone surveillance, search and rescue, and other such activities, including first responder initiatives. COVID-19 relief missions in the month of May 2020 India dispatched INS Kesari carrying on board 600 tons of food items, two medical assistance teams and essential medicines to the countries in the southern Indian Ocean. This relief mission provided assistance to Mauritius, Maldives, Madagascar, Comoros and Seychelles. In December 2021, 0.5 kiloton of food aid was delivered to Mozambique amidst a double blow of coronavirus and drought. INS Airavat has delivered pandemic related relief to Indonesia, Vietnam and Thailand.

Following the MV Wakashio oil spill off the coast of Mauritius in August 2020, India extended its support to the Mauritius government and international efforts by sending 30 tons of technical equipment and materials, supplementing the oil spill containment and salvage operation. India dispatched ocean booms, river booms, heli-skimmers, power packs, blowers, salvage packs, oil absorbent graphene pads and other accessories on board a C-17 Globemaster of the Indian Air Force.

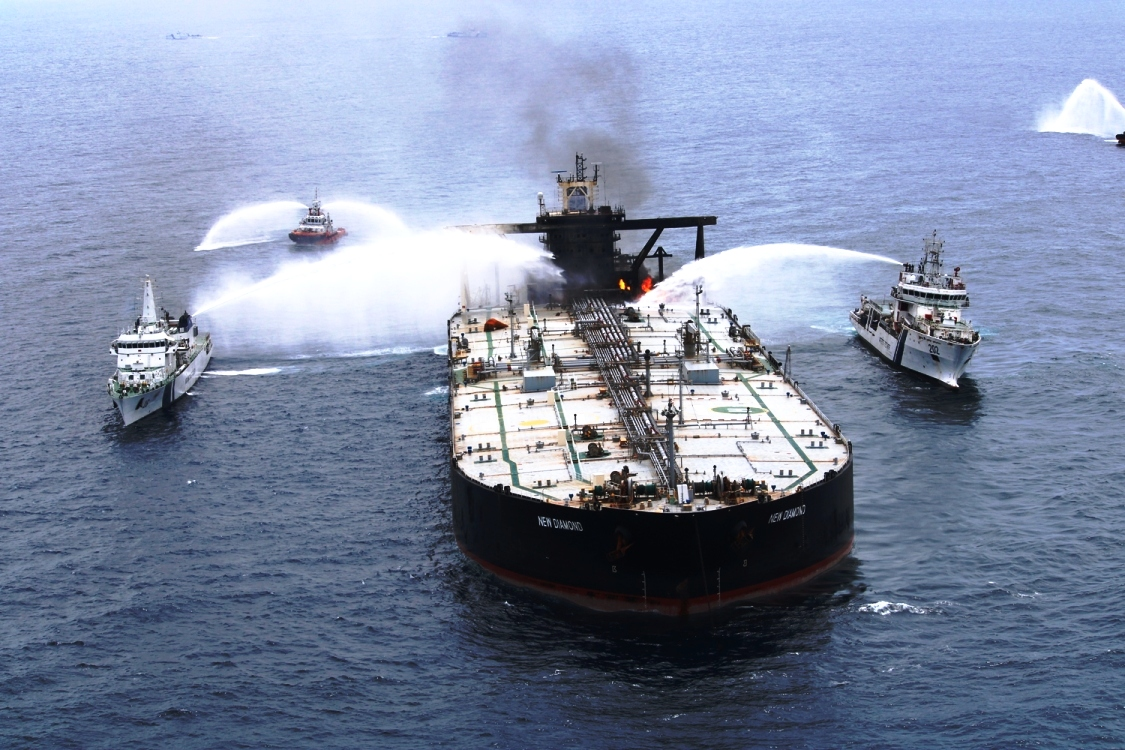
Indian Coast Guard and other vessels dousing and containing the fire on MT New Diamond in 2020

On 3 September 2020, Indian Coast Guard (ICG) headquarters received a call for assistance with regard to a tanker, MT New Diamond, with an onboard fire off the coast of Sri Lanka. In coordination with Sri Lankan Navy, Air Force and Coast Guard, and the Indian Navy and following aerial reconnaissance, ICGS Shaurya reached the scene as a first responder and commenced fire fighting. Following escalation more Indian coast guard vessels were dispatched including ICGS Samudra Paheredar and ICGS Sarang, Sujay, Ameya and Abheek. Dornier aircraft assisted in carrying material. Tugs assisted in preventing the tanker from drifting towards the shore. The ICG also assisted with X-Press Pearl.

== Commentary ==
SAGAR and associated documents are a continuation of India's thinking for the Indian Ocean region.

In the first five years since the phrase was first used by the Prime Minister, various government officials and documents have referred to SAGAR as a "vision, concept, policy and doctrine". SAGAR has also been called an "approach", a "declaration of national intent", and "a conceptual framework". Countries in the Indian Ocean region are interested in seeing how India implements its vision. SAGAR, a geopolitical construct, is meshed with Sagarmala, a project to improve domestic maritime infrastructure and logistics. SAGAR can take priority over Sagarmala. India's 2015 publication Indian Maritime Security Strategy under the Integrated Headquarters in New Delhi briefly lists SAGAR however does not elaborate on the interconnectedness.
