= ICGS Samudra Pratap =

Indian Pollution Control Vessel

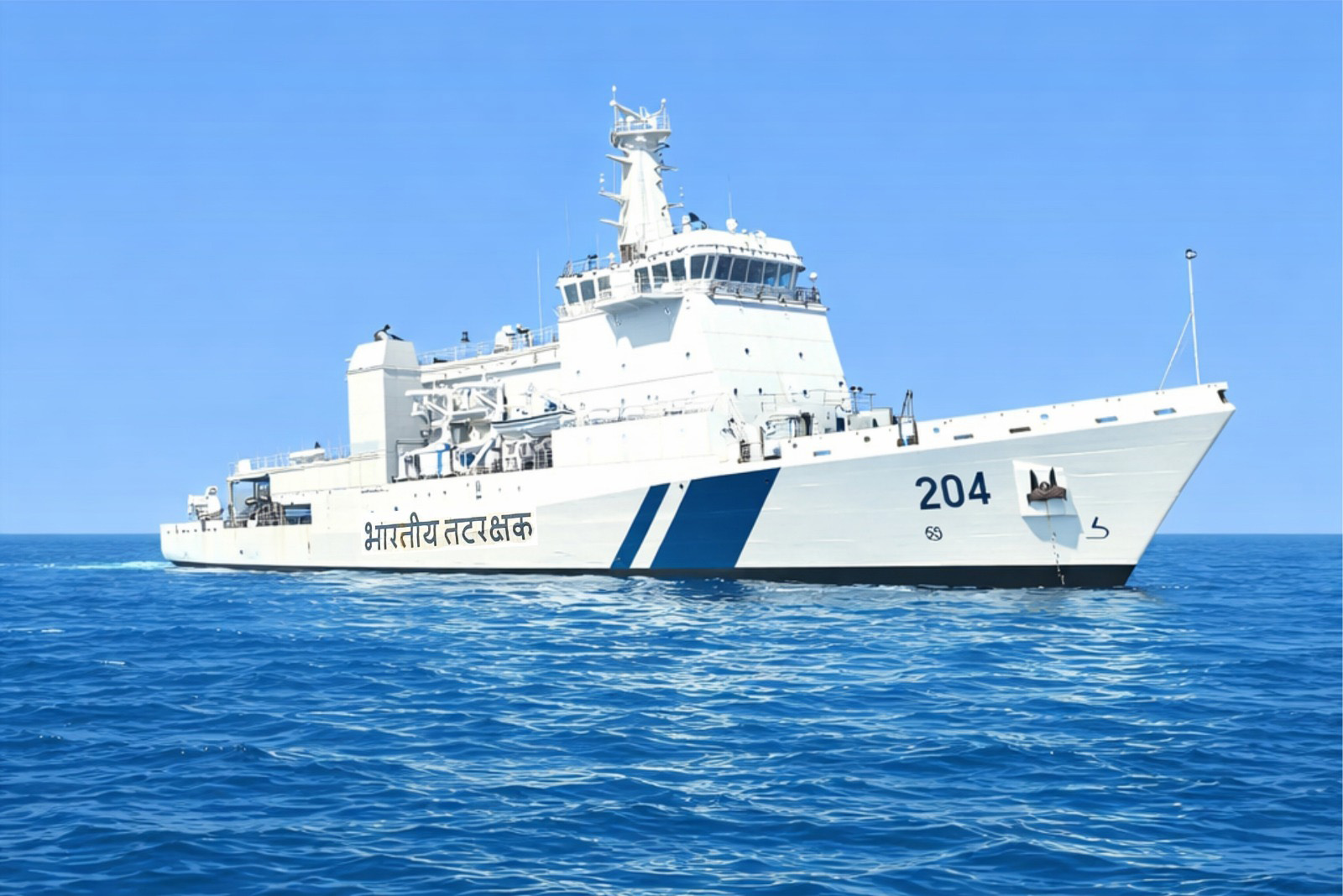
- ICGS Samudra Pratap at sea

History

India
- Name: ICGS Samudra Pratap
- Namesake: Majesty of the seas
- Owner: Indian Coast Guard
- Ordered: 22 June 2021
- Builder: Goa Shipyard
- Yard number: Y1267
- Laid down: 21 November 2022
- Launched: 29 August 2024
- Commissioned: 5 January 2025
- Status: in active service

General characteristics
- Type: GSL-class pollution control vessel
- Speed: 21 knots (39 km/h; 24 mph)

ICGS Samudra Pratap (lit. 'Majesty of the Seas') is an Indian pollution control vessel (PCV).

== History ==
The contract for the pollution control vessel was signed by Ministry of Defence for Indian Coast Guard on 22 June 2021 with Goa Shipyard with a completion timeline of 48 months. The total value of the contract was kept at ₹583 crore (equivalent to ₹618 crore or US$65 million in 2023) or ₹291.5 crore (equivalent to ₹309 crore or US$33 million in 2023) per unit (FY 2022). The ships have indigenous content of over 72%. In addition, these vessels will also be equipped with medium caliber guns with fire control systems and two main radars. The keel for the ship, designated as Yard no.Y1267 was laid on 21 November 2022 and the ship was launched 29 August 2024.

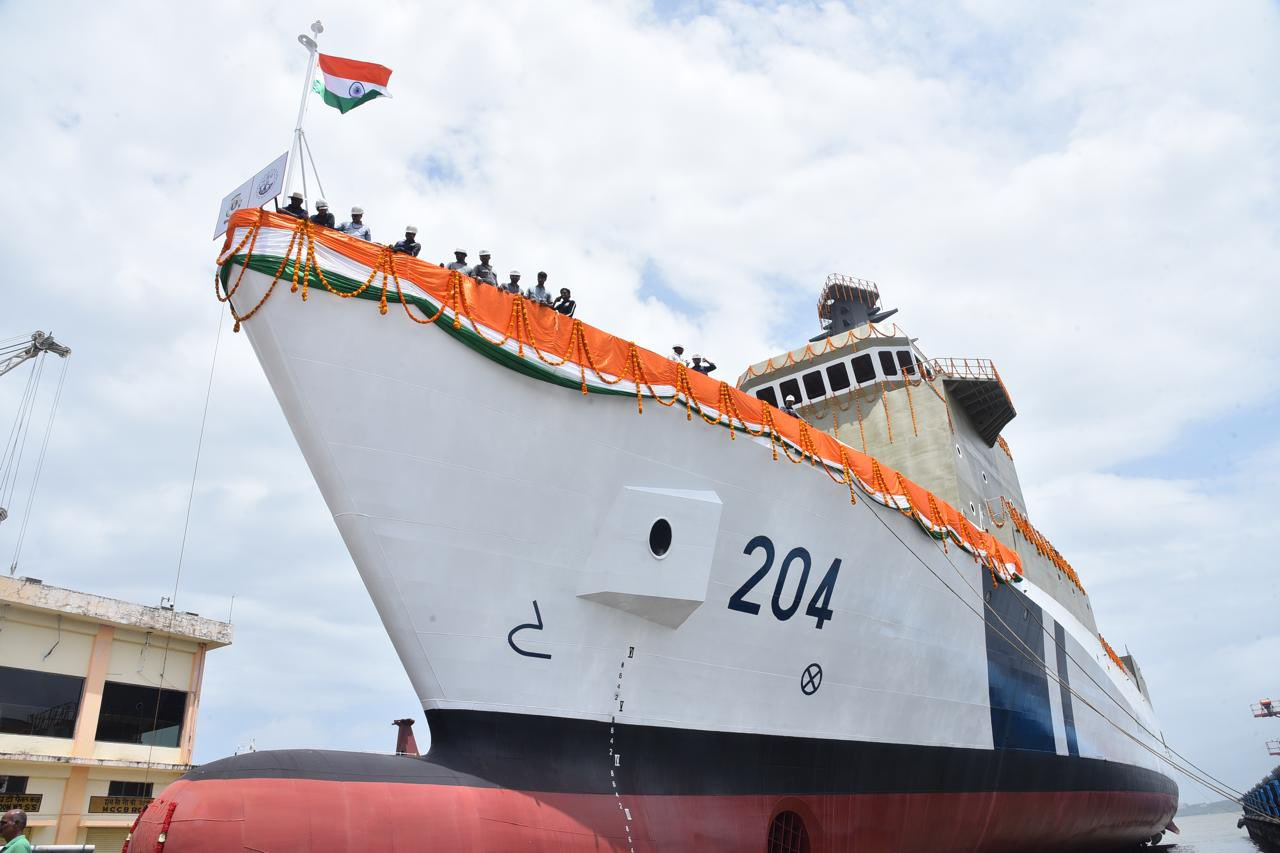
Launch of Samudra Pratap

ICGS Samudra Pratap was commissioned on 5 January 2025 by the Defence minister of India Rajnath Singh. Built as GSL with over 60% indigenous content, it is the first pollution control vessel designed and built entirely in India. The ship is equipped with advanced systems specifically designed to detect, contain and neutralise marine pollution. These include side-sweeping arms, floating booms, high-capacity skimmers, portable barges and an onboard pollution control laboratory. The ship also features a Fi-Fi Class 1 external fire-fighting system, enabling it to assist in maritime fire emergencies within India's EEZ.In a secondary role, the ship will also engage in coastal patrol, armed with a CRN-91 main gun and two 12.7 mm stabilised remote-controlled guns.

The International Fleet Review 2026 held at Visakapatanam was one of her maiden event and deployment. On 26 February 2026, the ship called at the Indian Coast Guard Jetty, Port Kochi, its home port, for the first time and has been assigned at Coast Guard Headquarters 4 (Kerala & Mahe). She was welcomed with a ceremony.

== See also ==
- Samudra-class pollution control vessel
- Adamya-class patrol vessel
- ICGS Samudra Paheredar
