= INS Aravali =

Indian Navy's Command and Control and IoR Domain Awareness centre

- Gurugram, Gurugram district, Haryana, India

Site information
- Type: Inland Naval Base
- Owner: Indian Navy
- Controlled by: Western Naval Command
- Open to the public: No

Site history
- Built: 12 September 2025
- In use: Ongoing

Garrison information
- Occupants: IMAC and IFC-IOR

INS Aravali serves as the Indian Navy's Naval Information and Communication centre, located in Gurugram city of Haryana state of India, where it enhances India's command and control (C2) and maritime domain awareness (MDA), and provides support to the co-located Information Management and Analysis Centre (IMAC) and Information Fusion Centre – Indian Ocean region (IFC-IOR). As a land-based naval establishment, which is referred to as a "stone frigate," INS Aravali is not a naval vessel but a landlocked facility commissioned into the Indian Navy.

== Background ==
=== Etymology ===
Named after the Aravalli Range, the base embodies resilience and vigilance, with its crest featuring a central mountain symbol for the Aravalli mountain range and a rising sun.

=== History ===
INS Aravali was commissioned on 12 September 2025 by Admiral Dinesh K. Tripathi, the Chief of the Naval Staff, in the presence of senior naval officers, including Vice Admiral Sanjay Vatsayan (Vice Chief of the Naval Staff) and Vice Admiral Tarun Sobti (Deputy Chief of the Naval Staff), as well as Mrs. Shashi Tripathi, President of the Naval Welfare and Welfare Association. The commissioning warrant was read by Captain Sachin Kumar Singh.

== Details ==
=== Significance ===
INS Aravali's motto सामुद्रिकसुरक्षायाः सहयोगं (Maritime Security through Collaboration), reflects its emphasis on ensuing maritime security through inter-agency and international cooperation. INS Aravali plays a pivotal role in bolstering India's maritime security architecture, particularly in the Indian Ocean Region (IOR). It reinforces India's position as the preferred security partner in the region and aligns with the vision of MAHASAGAR (Mutual and Holistic Advancement for Security and Growth Across Regions), promoting collaborative efforts for regional stability. By enhancing situational awareness and inter-agency coordination, the base contributes to the Navy's operational readiness and eternal vigilance over maritime domains. The base will also support the Information Management and Analysis Centre (IMAC), which was founded in Gurugram in 2014, and the Information Fusion Centre – Indian Ocean region (IFC-IOR), established in 2018. The IMAC gathers data from various sources, including coastal radars and satellites, to evaluate threats in the Indian Ocean Region (IOR). IFC-IOR works towards enhancing maritime security and safety in the Indian Ocean and it has established more than 65 international working-level linkages with nations and multinational/maritime security centres. The establishment of INS Aravali is a key part of the Indian Navy's strategy to integrate advanced technology into its operations. By focusing on artificial intelligence (AI), feeds from Integrated Coastal Surveillance System radars and Integrated Space Cell's ISRO-launched Indian military satellites, big data, and data analytics this initiative aims to be a dedicated Satellite Data Analytics Centre. The overall goal is to significantly improve India's maritime domain awareness (MDA), providing a comprehensive, real-time picture of activities in the maritime IOR.

INS Aravali's establishment reflects the Indian Navy's evolving strategy of expanding its support infrastructure inland. By diversifying its assets away from the coast, the navy ensures greater strategic redundancy and protection against threats. This naval facility in Haryana also extends the navy's outreach and recruitment efforts into the northern regions of India. The base's establishment marks a significant expansion of the Indian Navy's inland infrastructure, leveraging Gurugram's strategic proximity to New Delhi and its Indira Gandhi International Airport for enhanced logistical support.

=== Function and Role ===
As an inland naval station, INS Aravali's primary functions are not combat-oriented. The facility's location in Gurugram, surrounded by natural terrain, offers inherent security while facilitating rapid coordination with national and regional stakeholders. INS Aravali is designed as a technology and collaboration hub, providing administrative and logistical support to naval operations. It integrates various information and communication centers essential for the Indian Navy's MDA capabilities, enabling seamless connectivity across naval platforms and international partners. Training, administration (a nodal center for administrative control and coordination for naval operations and personnel in IOR), logistics and maintenance, and naval mobilisation. The base upholds the Navy's core values of duty, honour, and courage, focusing on information dominance to defend India's maritime interests.

== See also ==
- Indian Military
  - Andaman and Nicobar Command
  - Indian Military establishments in Haryana
  - Indian military related lists
  - Indian navy related lists
  - List of Indian Navy bases
  - List of Indian Air Force bases
  - List of Cantonments in India
  - Hisar Military Station
- Indian Ocean
  - Indian Ocean Naval Symposium
  - Indian Ocean Research Group
  - List of islands in the Indian Ocean
  - List of sovereign states and dependent territories in the Indian Ocean
  - Indian Ocean Rim Association
  - Maritime Silk Road
