= Ensuring Secure Seas: Indian Maritime Security Strategy =

Indian military publication

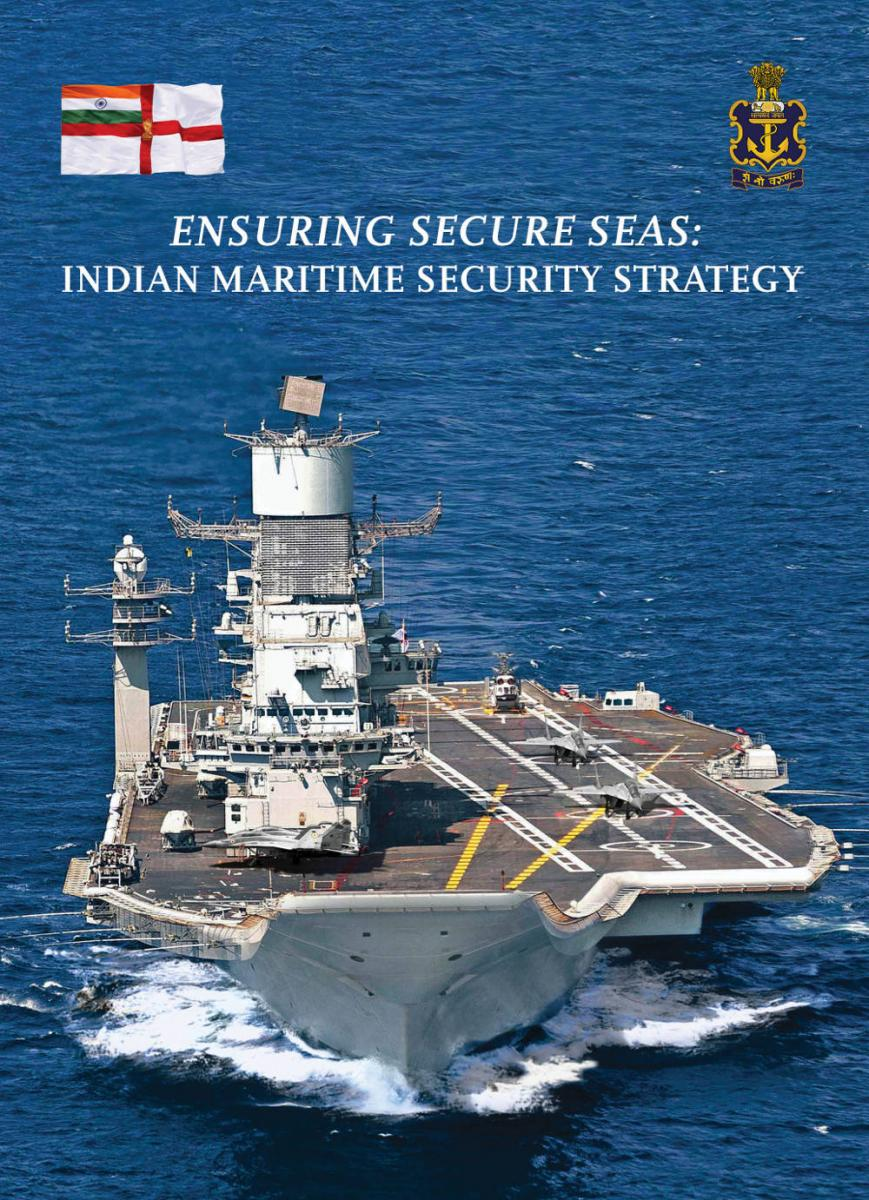
- Author: Directorate of Strategy, Concepts and Transformation (with inputs from across the spectrum)
- Publisher: Integrated Headquarters, Ministry of Defence (Navy)
- Publication date: October 26, 2015
- Publication place: India
- ISBN: 978-93-81722-22-0
- Preceded by: Freedom to Use the Seas: India's Maritime Military Strategy (2007)
- Naval Strategic Publication (NSP) 1.2

Ensuring Secure Seas: Indian Maritime Security Strategy (IMSS-2015 or Strategy-2015) is a document published under India's Integrated Headquarters outlining the nation's updated thinking towards its naval considerations. The previous edition Freedom to Use the Seas: India's Maritime Military Strategy (IMMS-2007) was published in 2007.

Primary areas of national interest have been expanded to include a larger portion of the Indian Ocean. Secondary areas such as the Mediterranean Sea have been included. Naval power will be built towards three carrier battle groups. Ballistic missile submarines will aid in sustainable and continuous nuclear deterrence and assured destruction. The strategy mentions international concepts and law such as freedom of navigation and United Nations Convention on the Law of the Sea, and that counter-piracy and humanitarian efforts will increase.

The document acknowledges the labyrinth of dynamic geopolitical linkages. Organized crime, climate change and natural disasters have been considered. The document briefly lists other national projects and initiatives Project Mausam and Security and Growth for All in the Region (SAGAR).

== Commentary ==
With regard to maritime law, India will need to walk the talk, taking cue from its own arbitration award with Bangladesh. The elucidation of "net security provider" in the Indian Ocean doubles down on the phrase and remains a challenge even within the limits of the northern Indian Ocean.

Strategy-2015 has been called "assertive" as compared to its "conservative" predecessor, however the document does not go into detail how naval dominance will be attained and only portrays the general role of carrier battle groups during conflict.

== Related publications ==
- Indian Maritime Doctrine 2004; Indian Naval Book of Reference
- Indian Maritime Doctrine 2009; Naval Strategic Publication 1.1
- Indian Maritime Doctrine 2015;

== Further ==
- Gopal, Prakash (9 December 2021). "India's Conceptualization of Maritime Security". Asia Maritime Transparency Initiative, Center for Strategic and International Studies, S. Rajaratnam School of International Studies.
- Choudhury, Anasua Basu Ray; Nayak, Sohini (26 August 2020). "Changing Dynamics of India's Maritime Policy". Diplomatist.
- Singh, Abhijit (21 December 2015). "India's New Maritime Security Strategy: 'Brand-building' in an Era of 'Geopolitical Discord'". Manohar Parrikar Institute for Defence Studies and Analyses.
- Chauhan, Vice Admiral Pradeep (3 February 2020). "India's Proposed Maritime Strategy". National Maritime Foundation.
- Smith, Cody T. (September 2017). "Century of the Seas: Unlocking Indian Maritime Strategy in the 21st Century" (PDF). Calhoun: The NPS Institutional Archive. Naval Postgraduate School.
