= Gurugram Air Force Station =

Military airbase in Haryana, India

Gurugram Air Force Station, of the Indian Air Force's Western Air Command, is located in Gurugram city in Haryana state of India. It is located 28 km south of New Delhi.

== History ==
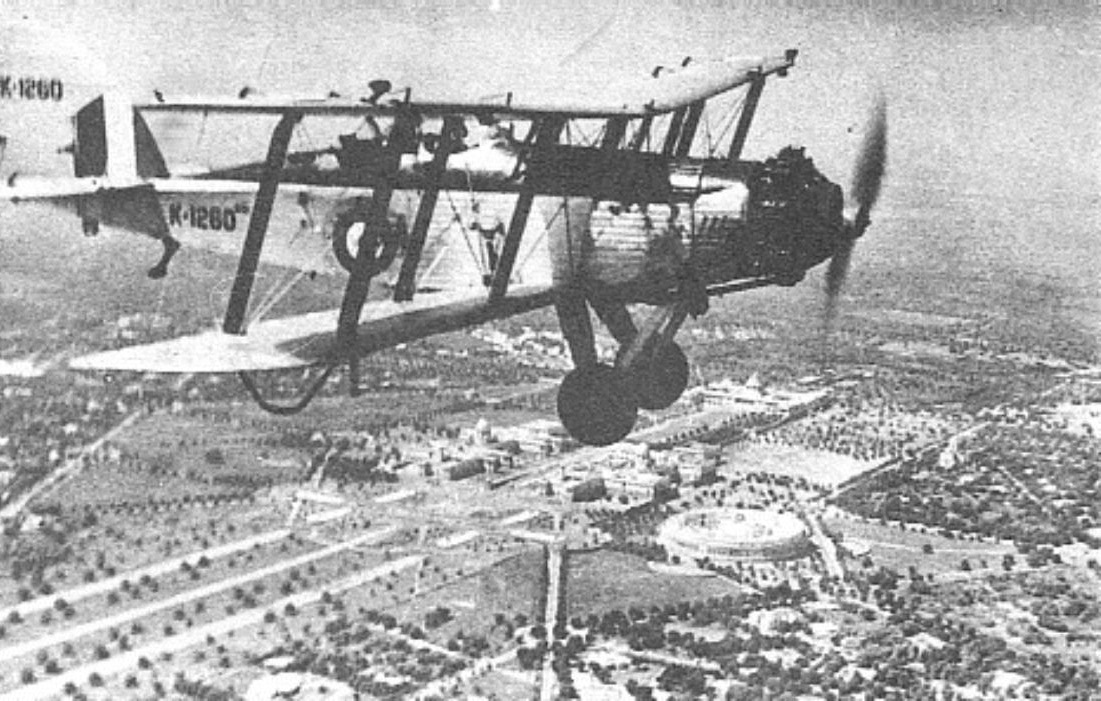
A Westland Wapiti, one of the first aircraft of the Indian Air Force.

On 8 October 1932, the Indian Air Force was established in British India as an auxiliary air force of Royal Air Force, and adopted the Royal Air Force uniforms, badges, brevets and insignia. In 1948, first airstrip was built in Haryana when Ambala Air Force Station was established following the independence of India. After the independence of India in 1947, an air force logistics base was established at Faridabad.

The Western Air Command, of which Gurugram Air Force Logistics Station is a key component within the National Capital Region, has been the major operational command involved in most of the war fought by India, including the Indo-Pakistani War of 1947, Sino-Indian War in 1962, the Indo-Pakistani War of 1965, Indo-Pakistan War of 1971, Operation Pawan (1986) in Sri Lanka and Operation Safed Sagar during the 1999 Kargil War, and the ongoing air logistics operations to supply troops deployed at Siachen Glacier.

== Facilities ==
=== Information Fusion Centre ===
Indian Information Fusion Centre (IFC) of Indian Navy, collaborates with the Information Fusion Centre – Indian Ocean region (IFC-IOR), to create the integrated multi-country platform on the vessels of interest in the IOR (Indian Ocean Region) by sharing the nonsensitive information with other IOR friendly partner nations. IFC is based at the Indian Navy's Information Management and Analysis Centre (IMAC) at Gurugram. IMAC is the single point centre on Indian Navy, linking all the coastal radar chains to generate a seamless real-time picture of the nearly 7,500 km coastline. The IFC-IOR can track and monitor 75,000-1.5 lakh shipping traffic in the region in real-time round the clock. India already has shipping information sharing agreement with 21 nations within IOR, of which 12 are already on IFC.

IMAC itself was opened in Gurugram in November 2014 as joint collaboration of Indian Navy, Indian Coast Guard and Bharat Electronics Limited to improve coastal surveillance and to provide coastal security to avert like the 2008 Mumbai terror attacks. It is staffed by the Navy under direction from the National Security Advisor. This fiber optic and satellite-links based network of 20 naval and 31 Coast Guard monitoring stations with 46 existing radars and 30 future planned radars as well as the automatic identification systems fitted on merchant ships, generates a real-time picture 7,500-km long coastline.

unition dump of IAF (28.488544, 77.040270) has restricted area of 300 meter within which no construction is allowed. There are many illegal construction within this restricted zone. Court had ordered these constructions to be removed. Also there has been rumours circulating that this zone of 300 meters will be extended to 600 or 900 meters. While the local politicians continue to make this an issue there is little outcome. The Indian Air Force Ammunition Depot, Gurugram (also known as 54 ASP), located at coordinates 28.488544, 77.040270, is a major military logistics installation situated in the center of Gurugram, Haryana. Originally established outside city limits, the depot is now entirely enveloped by one of India's most hyper-dense commercial and residential metropolises. The site's location has become the subject of intense national security scrutiny, judicial deadlock, and macroeconomic restructuring proposals.

== The 300-Meter Restricted Zone and Judicial Deadlock ==
Under the Works of Defence Act, 1903, a restricted buffer zone of 300 meters is mandated around the depot's perimeter, prohibiting civilian construction to mitigate blast radius risks. However, decades of rapid urbanization and a lack of early enforcement led to the massive settlement of this zone. Today, the restricted area houses over 50,000 structures and an estimated 250,000 residents. The Punjab and Haryana High Court has issued orders addressing the unauthorized constructions, but the sheer scale of potential displacement has resulted in a permanent structural stalemate. Rumors regarding the extension of the buffer zone to 600 or 900 meters frequently circulate, severely affecting the local economy and leaving citizens in an administrative vacuum where basic municipal infrastructure (sanitation, water, roads) is denied by the state.

== Strategic Vulnerabilities and Logistical Bottlenecks ==
Defense analysts and urban planners have raised severe concerns regarding the strategic viability of maintaining legacy surface-level ammunition storage in a dense civilian metropolis.

=== The 20-Minute Mobilization Unfeasibility ===
The operational mandate requiring a rapid 15 or 20-minute emergency mobilization of ordnance from 54 ASP to regional airbases or IGI Airport is widely considered Baseless and logistically unachievable under current conditions. The installation is hemmed in by severe urban chokepoints, overlapping civic infrastructure, and unregulated traffic patterns. In a national emergency, utilizing road transit through a major metropolitan area introduces critical vulnerabilities, including predictability, exposure to sabotage, and catastrophic transit delays.

=== Asymmetric Warfare and Collateral Risks ===
The persistence of surface-level "Danger Buildings" in urban centers poses extreme collateral risks. Recent global conflicts (including engagements in the US-Iran-Israel matrix, the Afghanistan-Pakistan theater, and the Russia-Ukraine war) have demonstrated that even advanced air defense systems cannot entirely prevent debris, misfires, or saturation strikes by low-cost drones, Multiple ballistic missile and loitering munitions (For Example USA defence Warning System Failed Miserably in West Asia and Middle East). Furthermore, domestic security incidents, such as the recovery of 2,900 kilograms of explosive materials and classified blueprints in nearby Faridabad, and historical security breaches at the Red Fort Blast, highlight the vulnerability of surface military assets to sabotage. Because of All this The Gurugram depot would may cause unprecedented civilian casualties, rendering the current buffer zone entirely insufficient.

== Proposed Modernization and Relocation Initiatives ==
To achieve genuine strategic readiness and resolve the civilian crisis, comprehensive modernization models have been proposed, focusing on the Defence Research and Development Organisation (DRDO) technologies and the Kundli–Manesar–Palwal Expressway (KMP) / Haryana Orbital Rail Corridor (HORC) logistical axis.

=== DRDO Vertical Shaft Containment ===
As an immediate technical solution, experts advocate for the implementation of DRDO-validated "Vertical Shaft Underground Storage" technology (PRID 1921292). This scientifically proven configuration utilizes subterranean reinforced concrete chambers to force explosive overpressure waves vertically rather than horizontally. This upgrade would securely compress the statutory restricted zone from 300 meters down to 100 meters, instantly regularizing the civic status of the affected population without compromising security.

=== Strategic Relocation (KMP/HORC Axis) ===
A permanent structural solution involves a complete land-swap relocation to highly strategic, low-density nodes such as Nuh, Manesar, Farrukhnagar, Jhajjar, or Badli. The relocation can be executed through three interoperable frameworks:

- Dedicated Military Airbase: Establishing a brand-new strategic military and cargo airbase integrated with underground silos.
- High-Speed Linkage: Connecting the KMP/HORC site via dedicated, secure rail spurs and expressways directly to the military cargo terminal at Indira Gandhi International Airport (IGI), allowing armored 15-minute deployment bypassing civilian traffic.
- Hybrid Model: Combining a localized tactical airbase with direct rail feeds to regional gateways.

Historically, the Jhajjar-Gurugram sector was the primary candidate for the National Capital Region's second aviation hub before political shifts directed the project to Jewar (Noida International Airport). The outdated administrative rule restricting new airports within 150 kilometers of IGI has been rendered obsolete by modern planning; Hindon Airbase operates 28 km away, and Jewar is within 70 km. Global benchmarks in London and Mexico City demonstrate that major metropolitan regions require 3 to 6 interoperable air hubs averaging 30 km apart to sustain cargo and defense loads.

== Macroeconomic Asset Monetization (NLMC Model) ==
The land currently occupied by 54 ASP is hyper-valuable urban real estate. Under the mandate of the National Land Monetization Corporation (NLMC), this land presents an estimated ₹60,000 Crore asset monetization opportunity. Upon relocation, the vacated land is proposed to be transitioned into a self-reliant Ministry of Defence revenue generator. Planners propose a world-class Defense SEZ and Transit-Oriented Development (TOD), rivaling projects like Bandra Kurla Complex (BKC) Mumbai and Gujarat International Finance Tec-City (GIFT). The site would be anchored by a 12 plus platform interoperable High-Speed Rail (HSR) Underground terminal serving the Delhi-Ahmedabad-Mumbai, Delhi-Varanasi-Howrah, Delhi-Amritsar-Jammu HSR corridors and Other Future Delhi HSR Lines. This hub would feature underground express grids connecting the Yashobhoomi convention center to the IFFCO Chowk Delhi Metro Airport Express, alongside integration with the Gurugram-Faridabad-Noida-Jewar Regional Rapid Transit System (RRTS) and signal-free road networks. This "Relocate, Modernize, and Monetize" model is designed to completely self-fund the military's underground silo upgrades, eliminate urban security risks, and provide a replicable blueprint for obsoleted military logistics nodes Nationwide.

== See also ==
- Ambala Air Force Base
- Sirsa Air Force Station
- Raja Nahar Singh Faridabad Air Force Logistics Station
- Hisar Military Station
- List of Indian Air Force bases
- List of Armed Forces Hospitals In India
- Railway in Haryana
- Road Highways and Expressways in Haryana
