= Information Fusion Centre – Indian Ocean region =

Information Fusion Centre – Indian Ocean Region
- Founded: 22 December 2018
- Country: India
- Type: Maritime Security Centre
- Part of: Indian Navy
- Garrison/HQ: INS Aravali
- Mottos: Collaboration for Safety and Security
- Anniversaries: 22 December
- Website: IFC-IOR

The Information Fusion Centre – Indian Ocean Region (IFC-IOR) is a regional maritime security centre hosted by the Indian Navy. Launched in December 2018, the centre works towards enhancing maritime security and safety in the Indian Ocean. Currently, the IFC-IOR has International Liaison Officers (ILO) from 12 partner nations. It also has more than 65 international working-level linkages with nations and multi-national/ maritime security centres.

== Background ==
The sea lanes in the Indian Ocean are considered among the most strategically important in the world with more than 80 percent of the world's seaborne trade in oil transits through the Indian Ocean and its vital chokepoints, with 40 percent passing through the Strait of Hormuz, 35 percent through the Strait of Malacca and 8 percent through the Bab el-Mandeb. 75 percent of the world's maritime trade also passes through the IOR.

Challenges like maritime terrorism, piracy and armed robbery, human and contraband trafficking, Illegal Unregulated and Unreported (IUU) fishing, gun running and poaching require situational awareness of the maritime activities. To facilitate information sharing, cooperation and expertise development, a need for regional collaboration was felt. IFC-IOR was envisaged to address this very need to promote collaboration for maritime safety and security in view of the Indian Ocean Region's importance with respect to world trade and security.

== Launch ==
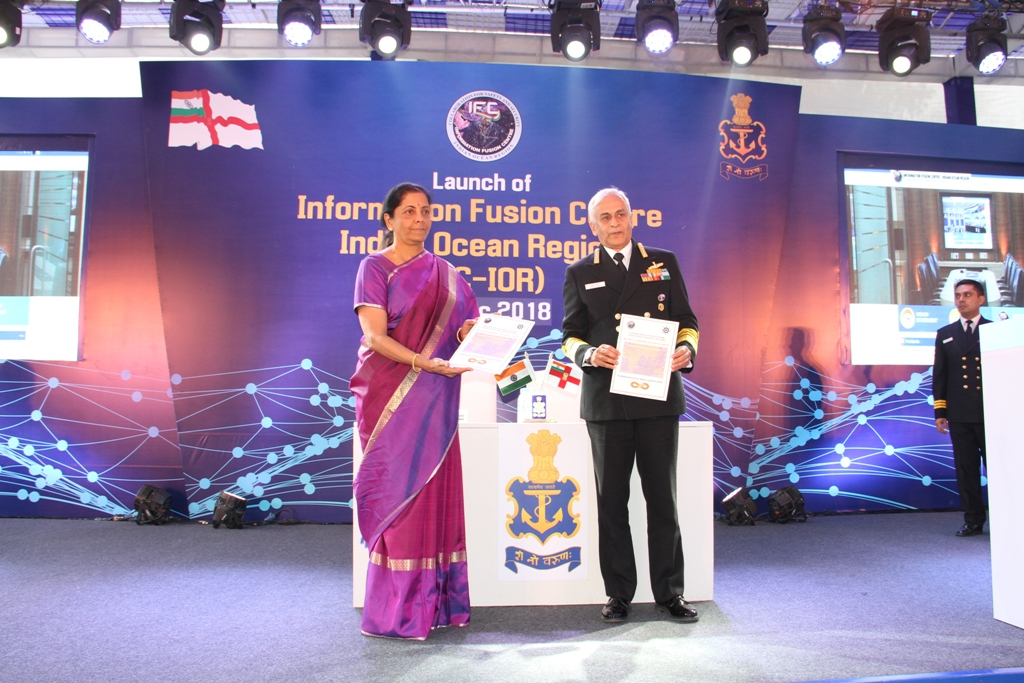
Defence Minister Nirmala Sitharaman and CNS Adm Sunil Lanba inaugurating IFC-IOR.

IFC-IOR was launched by the Minister of Defence Nirmala Sitharaman on 22 December 2018 at Information Management and Analysis Centre (IMAC) Gurugram, along with the then Chief of the Naval Staff Admiral Sunil Lanba.

== Role ==
IFC-IOR was envisaged to be a nodal centre of excellence for promoting collaborative Maritime Safety and Security; towards a peaceful, stable and prosperous Indian Ocean Region. The mission of the centre is:

To advance Maritime Safety and Security in the Indian Ocean Region; by enhancing maritime domain awareness and coordinating activities, through information sharing, cooperation and expertise development; along with partner nations and agencies.

The Centre fuses, analyses and disseminates information on White Shipping in the Indian Ocean. It also aims to collaborate with national and regional agencies and like-minded Centres to generate comprehensive Maritime Domain Awareness (MDA).

== Partner Nations ==
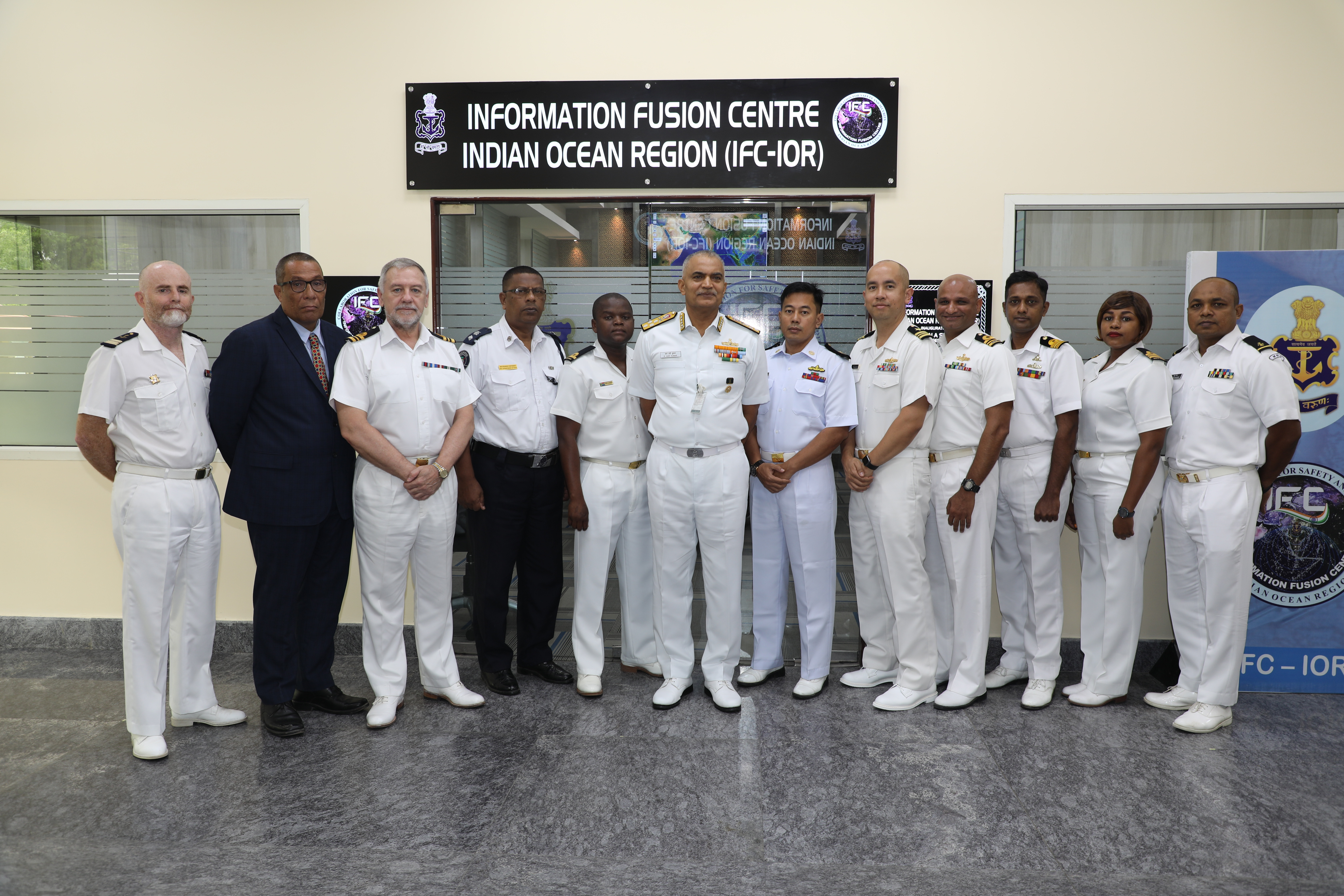
International liaison officers with the Chief of the Naval Staff Admiral R. Hari Kumar.

Since its inception, the centre has established more than 65 international working-level linkages with nations and multinational/maritime security centres. At the time of inauguration, IFC-IOR was staffed by the Indian Navy with a virtual presence of International Liaison Officers from participating countries. India has already signed information exchange agreement with 22 countries and one multinational construct – the Virtual Regional Maritime Traffic Centre which facilitates 30 other countries to create a virtual network for exchange of information under the international cooperation framework. In November 2019, the first ILO was posted to the centre. Since then, IFC-IOR has hosted ILOs from 14 partner nations – Australia, Bangladesh, France, Italy, Japan, Maldives, Mauritius, Myanmar, Seychelles, Singapore, Sri Lanka, Thailand, United Kingdom, United States of America. More ILOs are expected to join the endeavour in the near future. Apart from this, South Africa had deputed two observers to the centre.

Partners	Reference(s)
Partner Nations
Australia	
Bangladesh	
France	
Italy	
Japan	
Maldives	
Mauritius	
Myanmar	
Seychelles	
Singapore	
Sri Lanka	
Thailand	
United Kingdom	
United States	
Observer Nation(s)
South Africa	

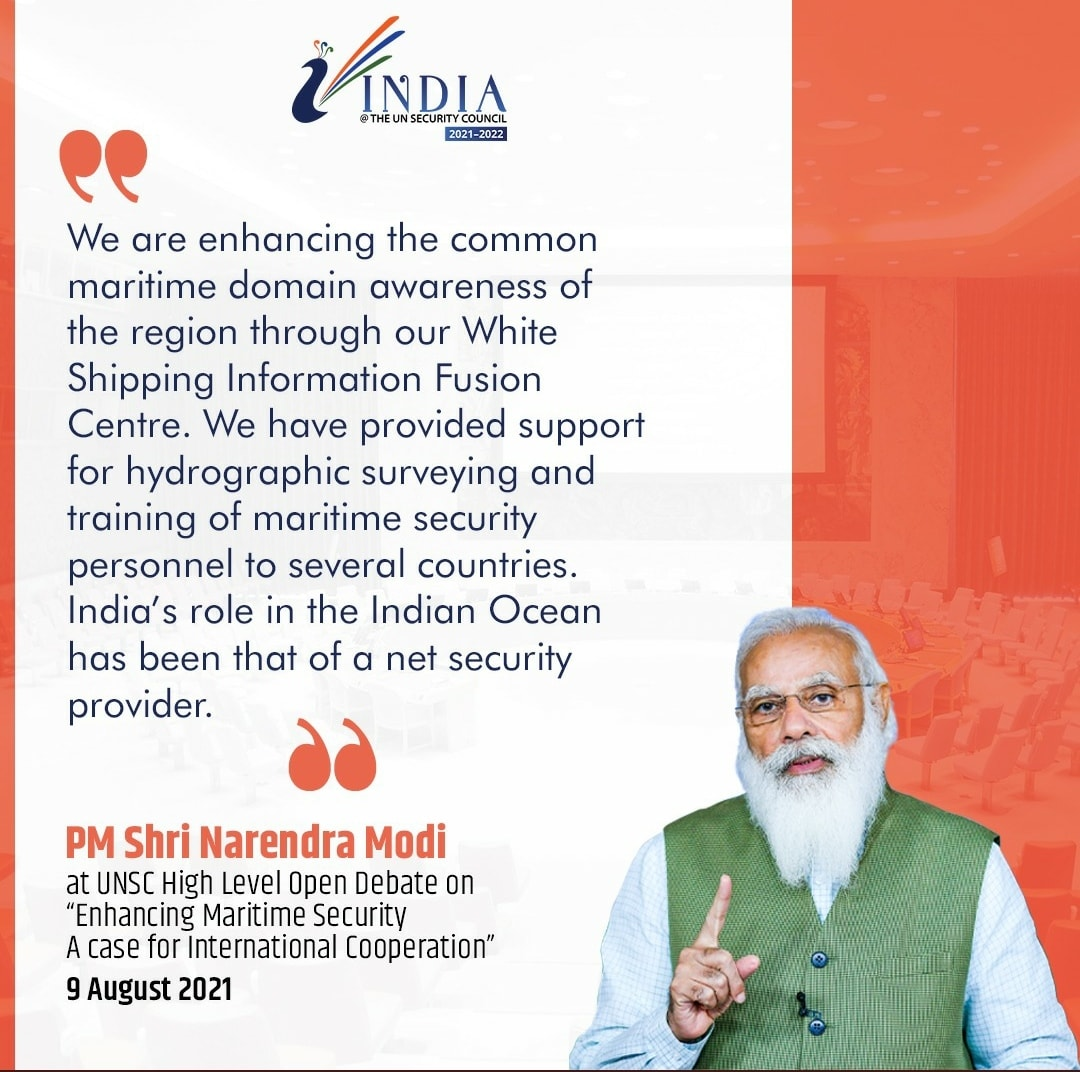
Indian Prime Minister Narendra Modi Statement in UN Security Council

India, during its presidency of United Nations Security Council, had organised a High Level Open Debate on Maritime Security on 9 August 2021. Prime Minister Narendra Modi, during his speech, mentioned about the role of IFC-IOR in developing shared maritime domain awareness.

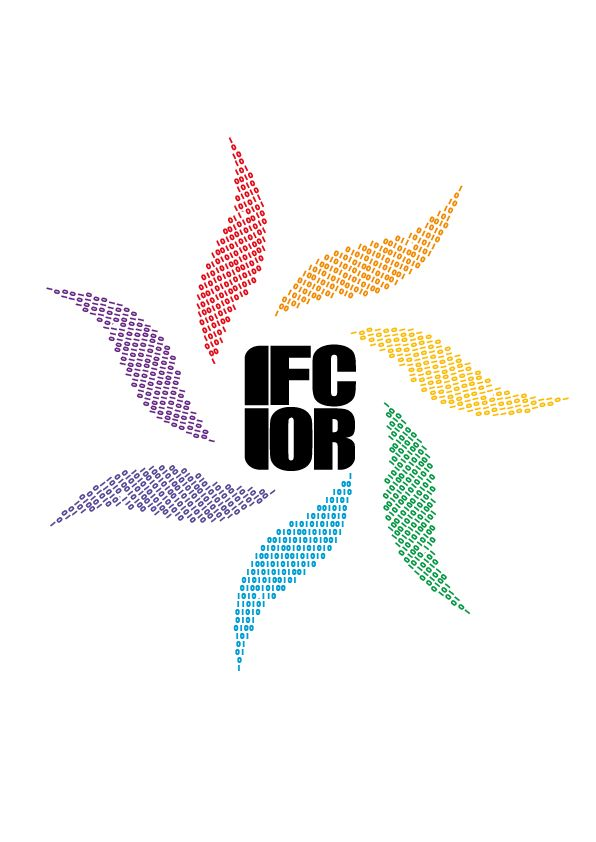
The logo of IFC-IOR.

During the Quadrilateral Security Dialogue (Quad) leaders' summit in Tokyo on 24 May 2022, the Indo-Pacific Partnership for Maritime Domain Awareness (IPMDA) was unveiled. As part of the IPMDA, information-sharing support between IFC-IOR and existing regional fusion centres – Information Fusion Center, Singapore, the Pacific Islands Forum Fisheries Agency, Solomon Islands and the Pacific Fusion Center, Vanuatu, both of which receive support from Australia, was extended.

== Logo and Motto ==
The logo of IFC-IOR is inspired by the centre's motto – Collaboration for Safety and Security. It has seven petals painted in the seven colours of the optical spectrum depicting the various national and international partners contributing in promoting the collaboration of maritime safety and security in the Indian Ocean region. The petals are formed by the binary code, highlighting the fusion of information and data from multiple sources.

== Publications ==
IFC-IOR publishes various reports including the Weekly Maritime Security Update (WMSU), Monthly Maritime Security Update (MMSU), Half Yearly Overview and an Annual Report. These publications provide information on varied maritime issues including maritime piracy, armed robbery, contraband smuggling, Illegal, Unreported and Unregulated (IUU) fishing, Irregular Human Migration (IHM) and other maritime threats (non-piracy). The centre also publishes a monthly weather forecast for the Indian Ocean region.

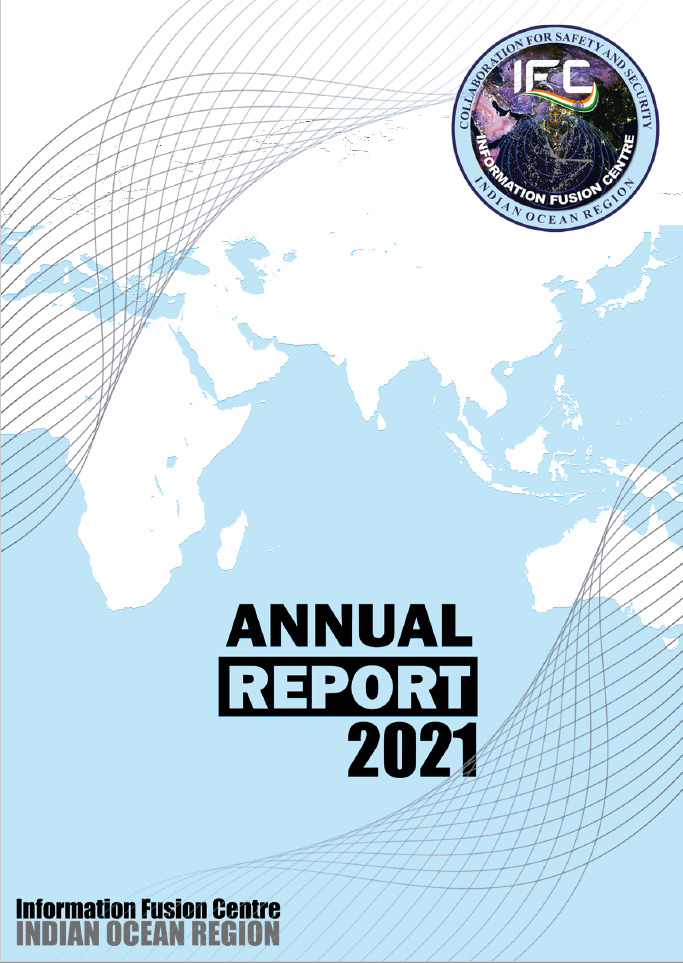
IFC IOR Annual Report 2021

== Seminars and Workshops ==
IFC-IOR conducts workshops at various levels including the Maritime Information Sharing Workshop (MISW) which is attended by delegates from a number of countries. In November 2019, the centre conducted the first Coast Security workshop for BIMSTEC Countries. The centre hosted a trilateral information sharing workshop on maritime domain awareness during the India-France-Australia Trilateral Ministerial Dialogue in May 2021. The IFC-IOR is also actively participating in capacity building of the member countries of Djibouti Code of Conduct-Jeddah Amendment (DCoC-JA) under the aegis of the International Maritime Organisation (IMO) in the field of information sharing for maritime safety and security.

== See also ==
- Indian navy related lists
  - Andaman and Nicobar Command
  - INS Aravali, 2025, Gurugram
  - Integrated Coastal Surveillance System, Vishakhapattanam
  - Information Management and Analysis Centre (IMAC), 2014, Gurugram
  - Security and Growth for All in the Region (SAGAR)
- Indian military related lists
  - List of Indian Navy bases
  - List of Indian Air Force bases
  - List of Cantonments in India
  - Indian Military establishments in Haryana
