= Information Management and Analysis Centre =

Maritime data fusion centre

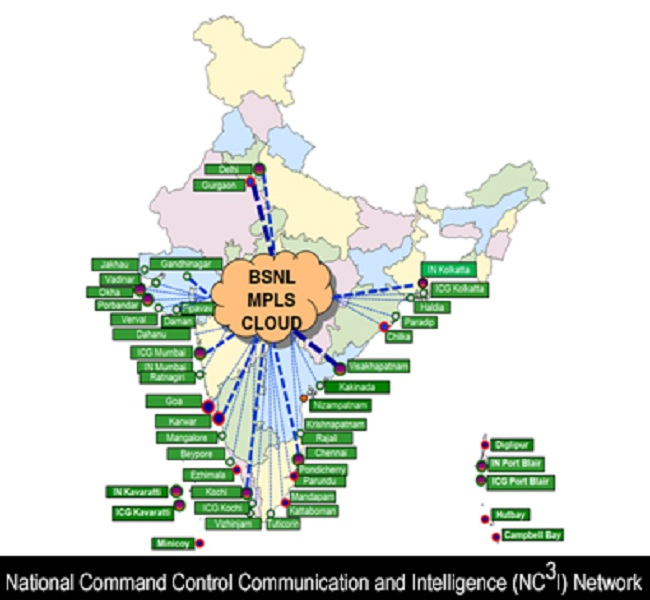
The National Command and Control Communication and Intelligence (NC3I) network. IMAC aggregates this data.

The Information Management and Analysis Centre (IMAC) was approved in 2012 and inaugurated on 23 November 2014. Located in Gurugram, India, it is the nodal agency for maritime data fusion that links information from the high seas and Indian's coastline and island territories.

IMAC tracks only non-military shipping, whereas the Directorate General of Naval Operations tracks military vessels on another classified network. A multi-agency center named as National Maritime Domain Awareness centre (NMDA centre) is also raised for specific military purpose under the Indian Navy.

The Information Management and Analysis Centre was conceived after the 2008 Mumbai attacks which took place on 26 November 2008 and is also known as 26/11. The terrorist attacks took place from the sea, being the first recorded act of maritime terrorism in India. In this attack, 10 terrorists from Lashkar e Taiba used the sea route for their journey from Pakistan and infiltrated into Mumbai after hijacking an Indian fishing boat.

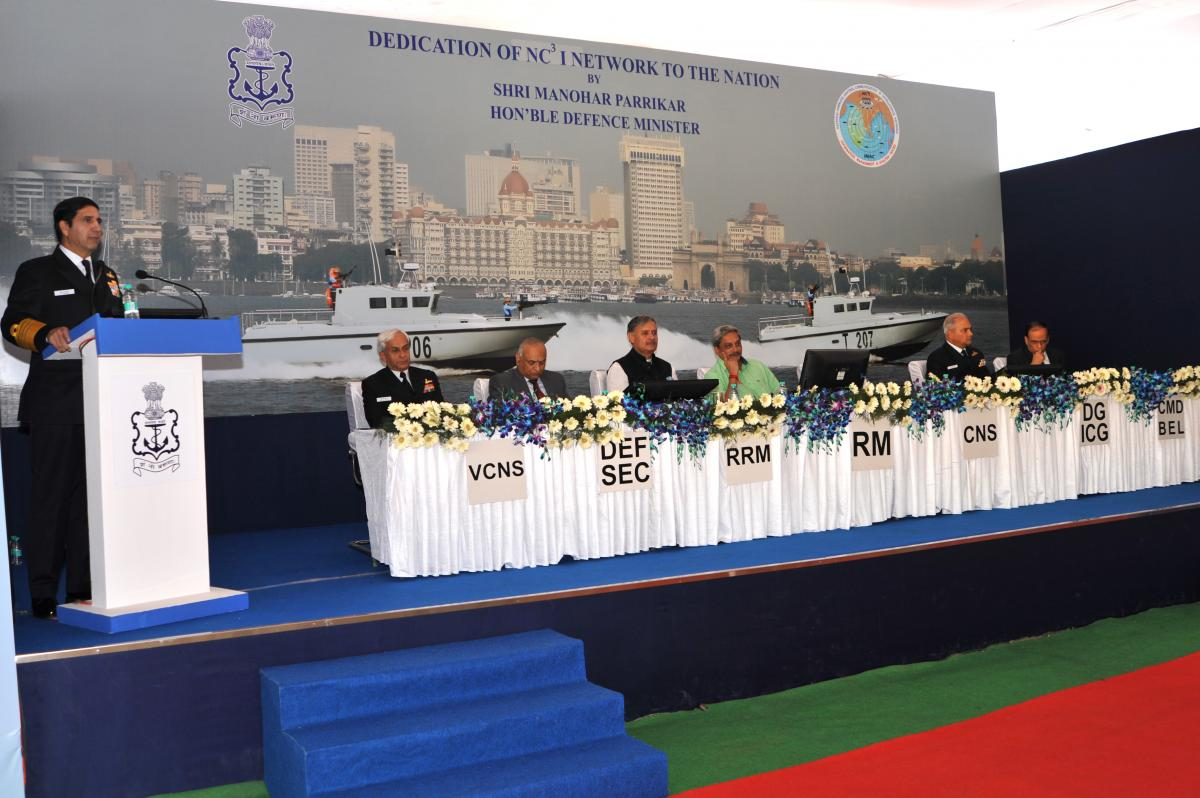
Inauguration of Information Management and Analysis Centre (IMAC) by Defence Minister Manohar Parrikar on 23 November 2014

The project was approved by the Defence Acquisition Council in 2012 at a cost of ₹450 crore and was inaugurated by the then Defence Minister, Manohar Parrikar. It is the nodal centre of the National Command Control Communication and Intelligence (NC3I) Network, which was established to link 51 operational centres of the Indian Navy and the Coast Guard spread across the country’s coastline, including the island territories. The IMAC tracks vessels on the high seas and gets data from the coastal radars, white shipping agreements, automatic identification systems (AIS) transponders fitted on merchant ships, air and traffic management system and global shipping databases.

== Information Fusion Centre – Indian Ocean region ==
The Information Fusion Centre – Indian Ocean region (IFC–IOR), was set up in the IMAC in December 2018, as a regional information coordination body, that coordinates with 21 partner countries and 22 multi-national agencies. The need to set up such a surveillance and information management system was felt following the 2008 Mumbai attacks. While most coordination is done virtually, liaison officers include those from United States, France, Japan, Australia, United Kingdom and Seychelles.

== Challenges ==
In 2020, reports emerged that even 12 years after the Mumbai attacks, around 60 percent (about 150,000) of small fishing boats lack an identification system.

== See also ==
- Indian navy related lists
  - Andaman and Nicobar Command
  - INS Aravali, 2025, Gurugram
  - Integrated Coastal Surveillance System, Vishakhapattanam
  - Information Fusion Centre – Indian Ocean region (IFC-IOR), 2018, Gurugram
  - Security and Growth for All in the Region (SAGAR)
- Indian military related lists
  - List of Indian Navy bases
  - List of Indian Air Force bases
  - List of Cantonments in India
  - Indian Military establishments in Haryana
