= MT New Diamond =

Very large crude carrier

History
- Name: New Diamond
- Owner: Porto Emporios Shipping Inc, Piraeus, Greece
- Port of registry: Panama
- Builder: Mitsui Engineering & Shipbuilding – Chiba, Japan
- Laid down: 14 December 1999
- Launched: 10 August 2000
- Completed: 29 November 2000
- Identification: IMO number: 9191424; MMSI number: 351247000
- Fate: Scrapped in Gadani in 2021

General characteristics
- Class & type: VLCC
- Type: Oil tanker
- Tonnage: 160,079 GT; 299,986 DWT
- Length: 330.0 m (1,082 ft 8 in)
- Beam: 60.0 m (196 ft 10 in)
- Installed power: Single diesel engine
- Speed: 15.5 knots (28.7 km/h; 17.8 mph)

MT New Diamond is a very large crude carrier. On 3 September 2020, the ship caught fire off the western coast of Sri Lanka, resulting in the death of a Filipino crew member. After burning intermittently for almost a week, the fire was reported to be extinguished by 11 September. In July 2021 the ship was beached at Gadani Ship Breaking Yard.

== Ship ==
The ship was built as Ikomasan by Mitsui Engineering & Shipbuilding in Chiba, Japan. Its keel was laid on 14 December 1999, it was launched on 10 August 2000, and was delivered on 29 November 2000. In 2013, the vessel was renamed Diamond Warrior, and again to New Diamond the following year. New Diamond has a gross tonnage of 160,079 GT and a deadweight tonnage of 299,986 DWT. It measures 330 metres (1,082 ft 8 in) long, with a beam of 60 metres (200 ft), and is powered by a single diesel engine that gives it a speed of 15.5 knots (28.7 km/h; 17.8 mph). At the time of its fire, New Diamond was owned by the Greek company Porto Emporios Shipping Inc.

== Fire ==
On 3 September 2020, a fire broke out in the engine room of New Diamond at around 07:45 local time (SLST), when the ship was about 65 kilometres (40 mi) east of Sri Lanka in the Sangaman Kanda Point. At the time, the ship was carrying 270,000 tonnes of oil from Kuwait to the Paradip refinery in India, with 18 Filipino and five Greek crewmembers on board. The cargo was loaded on 23 August 2020 at Mina al Ahmadi and was due to arrive at Paradip on 5 September. The ship was chartered for the voyage by the Indian Oil Corporation.

Reuters reported that the fire was triggered by an explosion and was initially brought under control before spreading upwards to the ship's bridge. The Sri Lankan Marine Environment Protection Authority (MEPA) said it believed that the ship's cargo tanks were intact following the fire, but that a slight oil slick had been sighted, perhaps from the fuel oil on board. MEPA said that early on 4 September two explosions were reported from New Diamond, though the Sri Lankan Army said that there was no danger of an oil leak at the time.

In the meantime, the government of the Maldives had expressed worry, with a presidential minister saying that the country needed to take all precautions to prevent oil from reaching its shores.

== Rescue operations ==
19 sailors were rescued by the commercial vessel Helen M, two by the Sri Lanka Navy ship Sayura, and one by the Navy ship Ranarisi, which landed a rescue party aboard New Diamond. A Filipino crew member died in the fire. 22 crew members were rescued and one person who sustained burn injuries was admitted to the Kalmunai Hospital. A total of four Sri Lankan ships responded to the incident, as well as a surveillance aircraft of the Sri Lanka Air Force. International responders included four Indian Coast Guard ship and three Indian Navy vessels, and two Russian Navy ships that were in Sri Lanka for scheduled exercises at the time. In addition, a Mi-17 helicopter of the Sri Lanka Air Force was also deployed in the search operation. Indian Coast Guards (ICG) deployed ICG Shaurya, ICG Sarang, ICG Samudra 'Pahredar' and ICG Dornier rescued 22 of 23 crew and confirmed no oil spill.

On 6 September, Sri Lanka Navy Commander Nishantha Ulugetenne said that the fire had been brought under control after 36 hours of rescue operations. However, it subsequently ignited again and burned for several more days before being declared contained on 9 September. By then, rescue operations had grown to more than a dozen ships from India and Sri Lanka, while the Sri Lanka Air Force had carried out 176 missions to drop about 440,000 litres (120,000 US gal) of water and 4,500 kilograms (9,900 lb) of fire suppressing chemicals. The fire was extinguished by 11 September, when salvage teams boarded New Diamond to work on staunching a fuel oil leak and prepare the ship for a tow to a port where the cargo of crude oil would be unloaded. In late September, New Diamond was taken under tow for the port of Kandla in western Indian state of Gujarat for the offloading of her cargo of crude oil, though the destination was subsequently changed to the port of Khor Fakkan in the United Arab Emirates, where the oil would be transferred to a different tanker for transport to Paradip.

== Legal actions ==
On 9 September 2020, MEPA announced that it planned to take legal action against the owner of New Diamond on grounds of violating Sri Lankan environmental protection laws. The captain of New Diamond, Stereo Sterio Ilias, was charged in the Colombo High Court by the Sri Lankan attorney general of causing an oil spill and violating the Marine Environment Protection Authority Act, with a fine of $1 million sought; the court decreased the fine to $65,000 and Ilias was released after paying. The ship's owner was charged $2.4 million for the firefighting effort, which the company paid as a condition of towing New Diamond out of Sri Lankan waters.

== Gallery ==
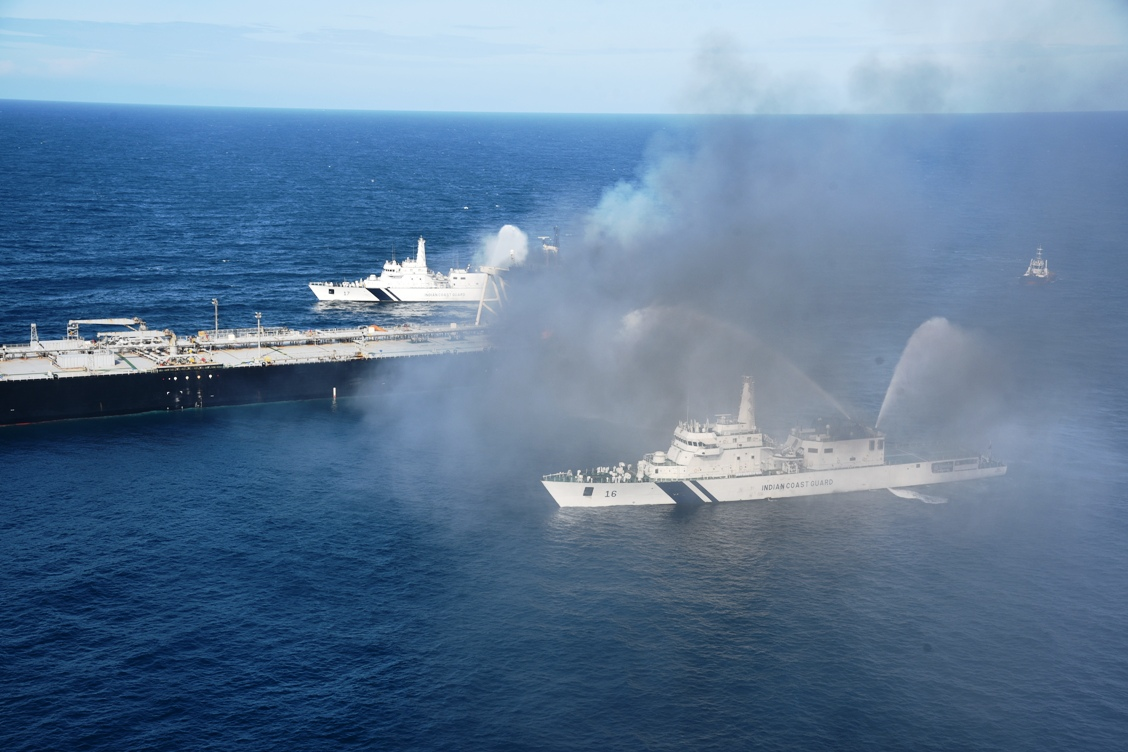
ICGS Shaurya and ICGS Sujay during fire dousing operation.

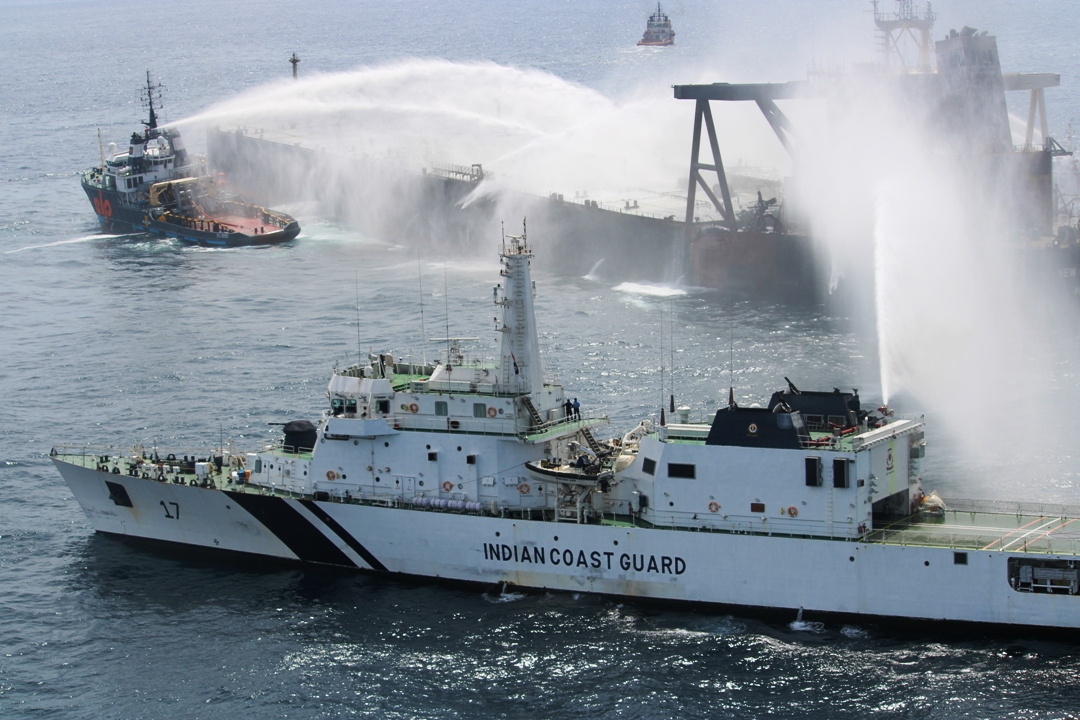
ICGS Sujay during the fire suppression mission.

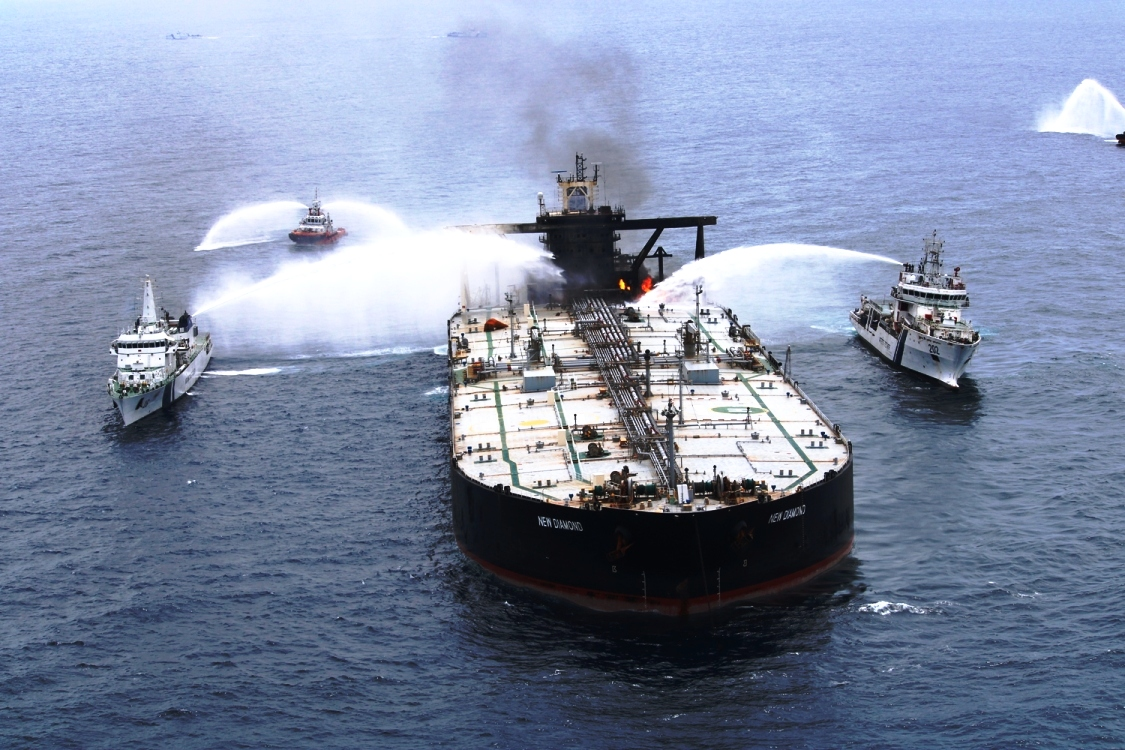
Indian Coast guard ships ICGS Samudra Paheredar and a Samarth-class patrol vessel during fire dousing operation.
