= Project Mausam =

Indian Ministry of Culture initiative

- Project Mausam
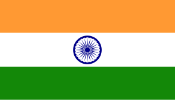
- Type of project: Cultural and economic
- Country: India
- Ministry: Ministry of Culture
- Key people: Culture Secretary Ravindra Singh
- Launched: April 2014; 38th session of the World Heritage Committee
- Website: https://indiaculture.nic.in/project-mausam

Project Mausam is a cultural project by the Indian Ministry of Culture and Archaeological Survey of India (ASI) with the Indira Gandhi National Centre for the Arts and the National Museum in New Delhi which aims to connect countries on the Indian Ocean. The term "mausam" means "weather" or "season" and is derived from regional dialects including the Arabic word mawsim, which refers to the season when boats can safely sail.

Project Mausam aims to rebuild maritime cultural connections with the 39 countries bordering the Indian Ocean. The project also aims to bring together historical and archaeological researchers to record the diversity of economic, cultural, and religious interactions between countries in. There are two visions for Project Mausam: the first is to understand national cultures between countries and the second is to rebuild communications between countries.

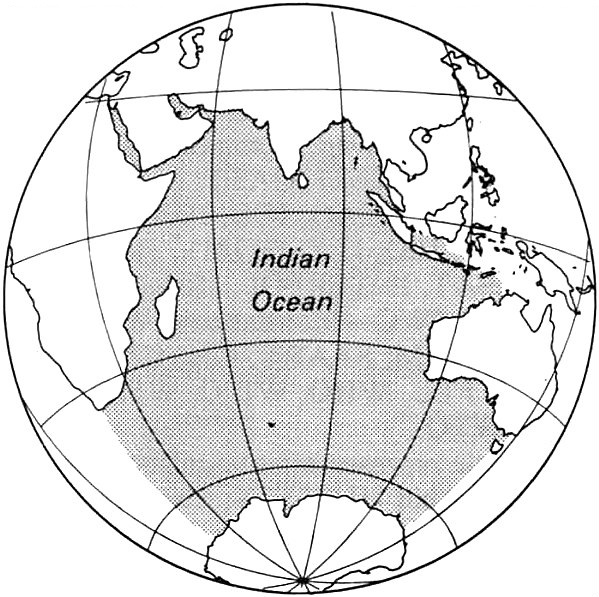
The Indian Ocean, as depicted in the CIA World Factbook (1990)

== Objectives ==
The project has four main objectives to complete its vision. First, it aims to revive lost connections with countries. The nations in the Indian Ocean have been interconnected for many centuries. The project seeks to document and celebrate the common economic ties and cultural values of countries in the Indian Ocean world, beyond contemporary ethic and national boundaries, to strengthen the connections between countries in the Indian Ocean sphere and to set a precedent for future cooperation.

Second, it plans to create connections and relationships to the existing World Heritage sites. The project would provide a platform to link the sites of cultural and natural World Heritage in the Indian Ocean world through a cross-national and cross-cultural narrative. Third, the project wishes to redefine cultural landscapes by identifying gaps in World Heritage sites and filling them through creating relationships between existing sites of cultural and natural heritage. It will also provide a multilayered and holistic perspective, which will allow for a fresh strategy to help understand past and contemporary relationships.

Finally, it aims to achieve cross-national World Heritage nomination. The project would advocate for maritime routes of the Indian Ocean to achieve cross-national nomination with sustainable tourism, heritage development, research, visibility, and promotion of cultural conventions.

Initially, the idea of Project Mausam was proposed by Ravindra Singh, then-secretary of the Ministry. Afterwards, the government of India was preparing to nominate the project as a transnational inscription on the UNESCO World Heritage List. The Indian government has increased financial investments to explore potential benefits for future generations.

== Historical background ==
Geographically, the Indian Ocean is bounded by the Antarctic or Southern Ocean in the south and forms a confluence with the Bay of Bengal and the Arabian Sea in the north. The ocean is bordered by Africa in the west and by Asia in the northeast, surrounding India and Sri Lanka. Naval trade on the Indian Ocean dates back to the third millennium BCE, when residents of the Indus Valley opened maritime trading with Mesopotamia, Egypt, East Africa, and the Roman Empire. Through these maritime trade networks, many goods were exchanged, including medicine, aromatics, spices, dyes, wood, grain, gems, textiles, metals, livestock, and stones. Those goods were then sold along the coastline of the Indian Ocean. The trade facilitated the exchange of religions, cultures, and technologies, contributing to the expansion of Buddhism, Christianity and Hinduism.

There was an increase in trade between India and Rome after the Roman annexation of Egypt. According to the Greek historian Strabo, 120 boats left the port of Myos Hormos annually for India when Aelius Gallus was prefect of Egypt. Indian states controlled the ocean until the thirteenth century without the influence of foreign powers. However, after the thirteenth century, the economic structure of India had changed due to the control of the sea by foreign powers. For instance, the Indian economy became dependent on foreign businesses after European powers took control of Indian Ocean sea routes. The ocean was controlled by the British Empire until World War I, during which Germany took over the sea. The Japanese subsequently gained maritime supremacy in World War II. Currently, the Indian Ocean carries half of the container ships, a third of the cargo, and two-thirds of the oil tankers in the world.

== Achievement and development ==
During 2014, there was a publication called "Maritime Cultural Landscapes Across the Indian Ocean" by Himanshu Prabha Ray. Nineteen lectures about Project Mausam were held on a range of themes in the same year. There was also an exhibition called "Africans in India: A Rediscovery" in the IGNCA held in India, October to November 2014 with a one day conference. A national conference about maritime trade routes was organised by Kerala Tourism and ASI in Kochi.

There was an exhibition called "Unearthing Pattanam: Histories, Cultures, and Crossings" in the Indian National Museum in 2014. The archaeological Pattanam site is located about 25 kilometres north of Kochi in Kerala. The site is about four kilometres from the coast and sits in the Periyar River delta. The location of Pattanam and the archaeological evidence unearthed in the site indicate the possibility that Pattanam could have been an integral part of the port of Muziris or Muciri Pattinam, which are mentioned in Tamil Sangam and Greco-Roman literature.

In 2016, ASI and IGNCA held an international conference about maritime routes on 16 February in Mumbai. During the same year, the director of World Heritage came to several Asian countries to explore the potential of Project Mausam.

On 28 January 2017, there was a conference discussing Indian maritime culture and its potential. On 22 March 2018, a conference about traditions of Indian maritime was held in Kerala, which lasted two days. Finally, there was a 150 million rupees fund allocation approved by the SFC for the development of Project Mausam from 2015 to 2017, of which 4 million rupees had been used. A fund of 60 million rupees has been approved to extend the project through 2020. The project has seen mixed and limited success depending on how the project is defined and what it hoped to achieve.

Indian Missions in the 39 countries have approached local authorities and several countries including the following, have nominated their resource persons for the Project Mausam: Bangladesh, Cambodia, Saudi Arabia, Thailand, Indonesia, Oman, Qatar, Singapore, Malaysia, The Islamic republic of Iran, UAE, Myanmar, Philippines and Jordan

== Commentary ==
Project Mausam is India's answer to the Maritime Silk Road of China, according to Akhilesh Pillalamarri, who wrote that "China is developing MSR in the backyard of India with strong support from Sri Lanka and the Maldives. India is planning to join the MSR for its potential economic benefits in the future."

As reported in The New Indian Express, the Indian government has been trying to move for UNESCO to award transnational heritage status to Project Mausam while China has been countering on the argument that it will be detrimental to the revival of the Maritime Silk Road.

An article in Economic and Political Weekly by KM Seethi argued that due to the increasing significance and influence of China, especially in building new maritime connect with Indian Ocean countries, India launched Project Mausam to balance the increasing status of China in the Indian Ocean world and revive historical ties in a new sustainable cross-cultural connection with other countries.

C. Mallapur wrote that the "Indian Ocean region has attracted attention from the world due to its strategic location and lanes for naval trade. As being the two largest countries in Asia, China and India are trying to build and enhance connections between countries in which trade is a significant factor." Project Mausam indicates that the Indian government is strategically using its soft power. The government will have to take strong measures to effectively implement the project by minimising overlapping governing bodies with a single dominating agency. Once the project is implemented, it will provide more opportunities for India's economy and trade as well as build international contact, in accordance with the "Look East" and "Link West" policies.
