= Integrated Coastal Surveillance System =

Indian radar network

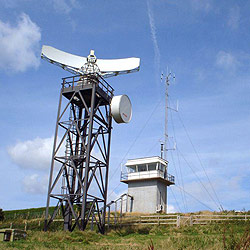
A coastal surveillance radar station in Visakhapatnam, Andhra Pradesh; November 2012.

The Integrated Coastal Surveillance System (ICSS) is a coastal surveillance system operated by India with the goal to protect its coastline, ensure regional security, and assist friendly navies by quickly detecting, locating and monitoring maritime activity in the Indian Ocean. The system was developed by the Defence Research and Development Organisation (DRDO) and Bharat Electronics, and forms part of the National Command Control Communication and Intelligence System (NC3I). Although the ICSS was built primarily for coastal and maritime security, the system can also be used for vessel traffic management, harbour surveillance and navigation. The core of the ICSS is a network of remote ground-based radar stations called the Coastal Surveillance Network (CSN). In addition to radars, stations are also fitted with optical sensors, electro-optical sensors, thermal imagers, cameras, meteorological systems, an Automatic Identification System (AIS), a distress alert transmission system (DATS), electronic warfare support measures, and very high frequency (VHF) radio communication systems.

The Coastal Surveillance Radar is the primary sensor of the Integrated Coastal Surveillance System, due to which the ICSS itself is sometimes referred to as the Coastal Surveillance Radar System. Coastal Surveillance Radars operate round the clock in all weather conditions and are capable of detecting small vessels such as trawlers, dinghies, fishing vessels, and buoys at sea. Data from the Coastal Surveillance Network is further supplemented by additional inputs from other sources such as the Vessel Traffic Management Systems (VTMS) located at major ports, Long Range Identification and Tracking (LRIT), the Fishing Vessel Monitoring System, and satellite imagery. Data from coastal surveillance radar stations is transmitted in real-time to the nearest Remote Operating Station, which sends the information to one of the four Joint Operations Centres (JOC) at Mumbai, Kochi, Visakhapatnam and Port Blair. The JOCs in turn feed data to the National Command Control Communication and Intelligence System (NC3I) operated by Gurugram-based Information Management and Analysis Centre (IMAC), which is the nodal agency for maritime data fusion.

The ICSS project originated from a proposal by the Group of Ministers set up to consider the recommendations of the Kargil Review Committee in 2000. The project was revived in the aftermath of the 2008 Mumbai attacks. The Government of India approved the construction of 46 coastal radar stations and 16 command and control centers in February 2009, which was completed in December 2016. An additional 38 coastal radar stations, 4 mobile surveillance stations, and 5 new command and control centres were approved in July 2018, and is expected to complete by the end of 2023. India has also proposed building coastal surveillance radars in friendly Indian Ocean states. The first overseas coastal surveillance radars were established in Mauritius and Sri Lanka. The coastal surveillance system is currently operational in India, Maldives, Mauritius, Seychelles and Sri Lanka.

== History ==
The Cabinet Committee on Security (CCS) set up a Group of Ministers (GoM) on 17 April 2000 to consider the recommendations of the Kargil Review Committee. The GoM consisted of Home Minister L. K. Advani, Defence Minister George Fernandes, Foreign Minister Jaswant Singh, and Finance Minister Yashwant Sinha. National Security Advisor Brajesh Mishra was also assigned as a special guest to the meetings of the GoM and the Cabinet Secretariat also supported the group. Among other recommendations, the GoM proposed setting up a network of surveillance radars along India's coastline to improve coastal and maritime security. The project was deliberated several times but little progress was made on the proposal. It was revived in the aftermath of the 2008 Mumbai attacks, during which the 10 terrorists had reached Colaba, South Mumbai on board inflatable speedboats. The CCS approved a proposal to build static radars along India's coastline on 28 February 2009.

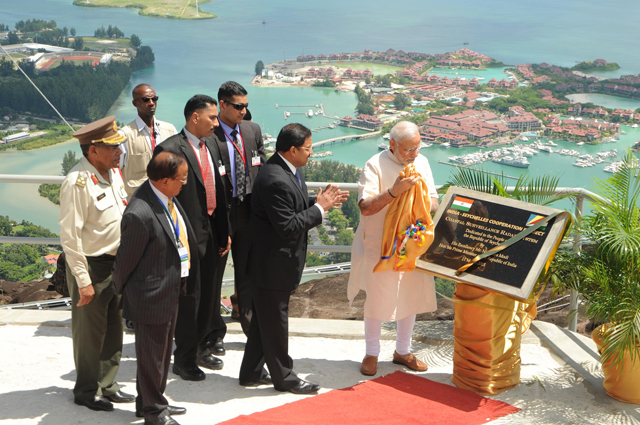
Prime Minister Narendra Modi unveils a plaque to mark the inauguration of the radar station at Ma Josephine, Mahé, Seychelles; 2015.

The Indian Coast Guard was tasked with implementing the project including defining its scope and coordinating with the Indian Navy, the Directorate General of Lighthouses and Lightships (DGLL), State Governments and other stakeholders. The Ministry of Defence appointed Bharat Electronics as the lead systems integrator for the project. The system, called the Coastal Surveillance Network (CSN), was built in two phases. In the first phase, 36 radars were installed on the mainland, 6 in Lakshadweep, and 4 in the Andaman and Nicobar Islands. Phase I of the system was completed with the commissioning of the 46th radar station on Sagar Island, off the coast of West Bengal, in December 2016. Phase I was estimated to cost over ₹600 crore (US$62 million) following delays. The Defence Acquisition Council, chaired by Defence Minister Manohar Parrikar, approved ₹800 crore (US$83 million) to construct an additional 38 radar stations and 4 mobile surveillance stations under Phase II of the project in July 2018. The mobile surveillance stations will be integrated with the two vessel traffic management systems (VTMS) in Kutch and Khambat in Gujarat. A further 5 command and control centres will also be built under Phase II.

By 2015, India had also set up coastal surveillance radar stations overseas. The first coastal surveillance radars outside India were established in Mauritius and Sri Lanka. Prime Minister Narendra Modi inaugurated the coastal surveillance system in Seychelles on 11 March 2015. Modi called the system "another symbol of our cooperation" and stated that it would "enable Seychelles to secure these beautiful islands and the vast expanse of waters around them. Seychelles will also continue to make an enormous contribution to the safety and security of the Indian Ocean region." India set up 10 radar stations in the Maldives. The coastal surveillance system was jointly inaugurated by Prime Minister Narendra Modi and Maldivian President Ibrahim Mohamed Solih in Malé on 8 June 2019. Bangladesh and India signed a memorandum of understanding to set up 20 coastal surveillance radars in Bangladesh on 5 October 2019.

Bharat Electronics signed a technology transfer agreement with Danish weapon and aerospace manufacturer Terma A/S to manufacture the latter's SCANTER 2001 radars in India in November 2020. The company issued a statement, "Terma understands India’s call for self-reliance and its move towards Make in India and Atmanirbhar Bharat [self-reliant India] and thereby extends its support by adapting to the country’s demand and offering Transfer of Technology (ToT)."

India's coastline is 7,516 km long and is the fifth largest coastline in the world. Its exclusive economic zone is spread across an area of 2.3 million km^{2} (0.89 million sq mi). Nine Indian states and four union territories are located along the coastline, and the country has around 1,382 (mostly uninhabited) islands. The Indian Ocean region accounts for 75% of global maritime trade and 50% of the world's goods transit through the region. India is located in the northern Indian Ocean near major global shipping lanes with the Suez Canal, Bab-el-Mandeb and Strait of Hormuz to its west, and the Strait of Malacca, Sunda Strait, and Lombok Strait to its east. Hundreds of thousands of ships transit close to India's coastline and exclusive economic zone annually. There are an estimated 12,000 ships and at least 300 fishing vessels close enough to require monitoring at any given time, in addition to over 300,000 Indian fishing vessels.

== System components ==
Stations are fitted with coastal surveillance radars, frequency diversity radars, meteorological systems, optical sensors, electro-optical sensors, charge-coupled device (CCD) day cameras, Low Light TV (LLTV) night vision cameras, long-range thermal imagers, an Automatic Identification System (AIS), a distress alert transmission system (DATS), electronic warfare support measures, and very high frequency (VHF) radio communication systems. Each radar station transmits data to one of 12 Remote Operating Stations through two dedicated Bharat Sanchar Nigam Limited lines each. The 12 Remote Operating Stations feed information to the four Joint Operations Centres (JOC) at Mumbai, Kochi, Visakhapatnam and Port Blair. JOCs are jointly staffed by Indian Navy and Coast Guard personnel, and also network with personnel from other agencies such as Customs, Intelligence Bureau, and the port authorities. JOCs in turn feed all information to the Information Management and Analysis Centre (IMAC) based in Gurugram Air Force Station, Haryana which is the nodal agency for maritime data fusion. All communications occur in real-time.

All 46 stations built in Phase I included a 25 nautical-mile range Terma A/S Scanter 2100 HCP frequency diversity radar with a dual antenna, Obzerv Technologies ARGC-2400 active range-gated electro-optic sensors with a range of up to 10 nautical-miles, and a marine small target tracker that can positively identify vessels carrying class "A" and "B" AIS transponders. The stations also have a Saab Transponder Tech R40 Base Station that is the key component of the physical Automatic Identification System (AIS) shore station. It enables the station to communicate with vessels that are equipped with a registered AIS transponder. Some sensors, cameras and radars in Phase I stations were also supplied by Israeli defence company Elta Systems. Other components in Phase I stations, including modules and spares, were manufactured by Bharat Electronics and other Indian suppliers. The instruments located at each station vary by type and manufacturer due to technology upgrades, and as the Government of India seeks to produce more components indigenously as part of its Make in India and Atmanirbhar Bharat initiatives.

=== Coastal Surveillance Radar ===
The Coastal Surveillance Radar (CSR) was developed by the Electronics and Radar Development Establishment (LRDE) in Bangalore, Karnataka, and is the primary sensor of the ICSS. The radars operate round the clock in all weather conditions and are capable of detecting smaller vessels such as trawlers, dinghies, dhows, fishing vessels and buoys. A single CSR has a maximum range of 50 km and can detect vessels with a radar cross-section of 1 square meters within a 20 km range. A single Coastal Surveillance Radar can spot a vessel even among a clutter of vessels in heavy traffic situations up to a total of 1,500 vessels. The radars typically operate in the X band but switch to the S band during bad weather. They can be operated both locally and remotely. Although radars were built primarily for coastal surveillance, they can also be used for vessel traffic management, harbor surveillance and navigation. Coastal Surveillance Radars were designed so that they can also be mounted on a ship and used as a floating sea surface target surveillance radar. The first 3 Coastal Surveillance Radars were installed at Balasore, Odisha.

=== Indian AIS ===
The Indian Automatic Identification System (IAIS), or Indian AIS, is an indigenous automatic identification system (AIS) developed by the Defence Electronics Application Laboratory (DEAL) in Dehradun, Uttarakhand, and produced by Bharat Electronics at Machilipatnam, Andhra Pradesh. Development of the system began in the early 2010s and entered the final stages of pilot-testing in mid-2015. DEAL installed Indian AIS on board around 150 vessels, all weighing under 20 tonnes, operating near the coast of Kochi, Kerala as part of the pilot project. The lab also established radars at Aroor, Malippuram, and Fort Kochi. The Indian AIS is also integrated with the automatic identification system (AIS) mandated by the International Maritime Organization (IMO). The IMO only mandates AIS on vessels above 300 tonnes.

Following the 2008 Mumbai attacks, the Directorate General of Shipping had mandated that all ships having a length of more than 20 meters must install an AIS. However, most fishermen did not comply as the cost was prohibitive. In 2017, the Home Ministry approved ₹336 crore (US$35 million) to fit sub-20 meter boats with IAIS transponders. The Indian Navy began installing IAIS transporters onboard sub-20 meter fishing boats and dhows, and by 2019, had equipped 500 boats with transponders in Gujarat, 500 in Tamil Nadu and 50 in Puducherry. The arrangement benefits Indian fisherman as weather and fish shoal data from the Indian National Centre for Ocean Information Services (INOCOIS), as well as distress alerts, can be relayed to the vessels through the IAIS. As of November 2020, only 40% of small fishing boats in India had AIS transponders.

=== Electro-optical sight ===
The electro-optical sensor system was developed by the Instruments Research and Development Establishment (IRDE) in Dehradun. It comprises thermal imagers and optical cameras with a range of around 25 kilometers. The electro-optical sensors are expected to be able to auto track a vessel as small as 5 meters in length.

=== Diver Detection Sonar ===
The Diver Detection Sonar is a network of underwater sensors developed by the Naval Physical and Oceanographic Laboratory (NPOL) based in Kochi, Kerala.

=== Software ===
The software that powers the ICSS was developed by the Centre for Artificial Intelligence and Robotics (CAIR) in Bangalore, Karnataka. The software integrates the multiple inputs received by the system into a comprehensive view. Data fusion was a major design challenge that software designers had to resolve. For example, the software can successfully recognize when two radar stations detect the same vessel and can combine those images to track the vessel. It also enables Remote Operating Stations to operate coastal radars, and manipulate sensors and cameras remotely. Remote Operating Stations can also designate an area as a "sensitive zone", causing the software's alarm system to trigger an alert whenever a vessel enters the designated area. Cameras at the stations are capable of zooming in on people standing on the deck of a ship within a 15 nautical-mile range.

American defence conglomerate Raytheon Technologies had reportedly provided customized software to Bharat Electronics to power Phase I stations. The company has since developed its own solution. R&D Chief, I.V. Sarma, stated that Bharat Electronics had gained significant experience in data fusion from developing combat management systems for the Indian Navy, which required integrating inputs from multiple radars fitted on a ship, and an Integrated Air Command and Control System for the Indian Air Force. The coastal surveillance system software had over 500,000 lines of code as of December 2016.

=== Satellite imagery ===
The Sindhu Netra (Hindi: "Eye of the Sea") microsatellite was developed to monitor the activities of military and merchant navy ships in the Indian Ocean region, and is capable of automatically identifying warships and merchant ships. Hyderabad-based Research Centre Imarat, a division of the DRDO, awarded a ₹2.2 crore (US$230,000) contract to faculty members and students of PES University, Bangalore to develop the satellite in collaboration with the Indian Space Research Organisation (ISRO). Sindhu Netra was successfully launched onboard PSLV-C51 from the Satish Dhawan Space Centre in Sriharikota, Andhra Pradesh on 28 February 2021.

== Locations ==
There were 46 operational coastal surveillance radars in India as of December 2016. A further 38 radars are being built and is expected to be completed by the end of 2023. There are also a total of 32 coastal surveillance radars across the Maldives, Mauritius, Seychelles and Sri Lanka. India is in the process of setting up 20 coastal radars in Bangladesh, and has proposed setting up radars in Myanmar, the Philippines and Thailand. The following tables list all known locations of coastal surveillance radars ordered geographically by coast from the northernmost station to the south.

West Coast
No.	Locations	State/Union territory
1	Dwarka	Gujarat
2	Navadra	Gujarat
3	Porbandar	Gujarat
4	Mangrol	Gujarat
5	Diu	Dadra and Nagar Haveli and Daman and Diu
6	Gopnath	Gujarat
7	Hazira Port	Gujarat
8	Daman	Dadra and Nagar Haveli and Daman and Diu
9	Tarapur	Maharashtra
	Mumbai	Maharashtra
10	Khanderi	Maharashtra
11	Korlai Fort	Maharashtra
12	Tolkeshwar	Maharashtra
13	Devgarh	Maharashtra
14	Aguada	Goa
15	Belekeri	Karnataka
16	Bhatkal	Karnataka
17	Kundapur	Karnataka
18	Udupi	Karnataka
19	Surathkal	Karnataka
20	Mount Dilli	Kerala
21	Ponnani	Kerala
22	Kochi	Kerala
23	Kollam	Kerala
24	Kiltan	Lakshadweep
25	Agatti Island	Lakshadweep
26	Andrott	Lakshadweep
27	Kalpeni	Lakshadweep
28	Suheli Par	Lakshadweep
29	Minicoy	Lakshadweep

East Coast
No.	Locations	State/Union territory
1	Sagar Island	West Bengal
2	Paradeep	Odisha
3	Gopalpur	Odisha
4	Kalingapatnam	Andhra Pradesh
5	Visakhapatnam	Andhra Pradesh
6	Dolphin's Nose	Andhra Pradesh
7	Karavaka	Andhra Pradesh
8	Machilipatnam	Andhra Pradesh
9	Ramayapatnam	Andhra Pradesh
10	Krishnapatnam	Andhra Pradesh
11	Chennai	Tamil Nadu
12	Pondicherry	Puducherry
13	Kodikkarai	Tamil Nadu
14	Kilakarai	Tamil Nadu
15	?	Tamil Nadu
16	Manapad	Tamil Nadu
17	Kanyakumari	Tamil Nadu
18	East Island	Andaman and Nicobar Islands
19	Narcondam Island	Andaman and Nicobar Islands
20	Little Andaman	Andaman and Nicobar Islands
21	Car Nicobar	Andaman and Nicobar Islands

Overseas
Location	Country
10 stations	Maldives
Grand-Gaube	Mauritius
Pointe du Diable	Mauritius
Gris-Gris	Mauritius
Le Morne Brabant	Mauritius
Albion	Mauritius
Rodrigues	Mauritius
Agaléga	Mauritius
St. Brandon	Mauritius
Ma Josephine	Seychelles
Alphonse Atoll	Seychelles
Assumption Island (2)	Seychelles
Astove Atoll	Seychelles
Farquhar Atoll	Seychelles
6 stations	Sri Lanka
