= ICGS Samudra Paheredar =

Indian Pollution Control Vessel

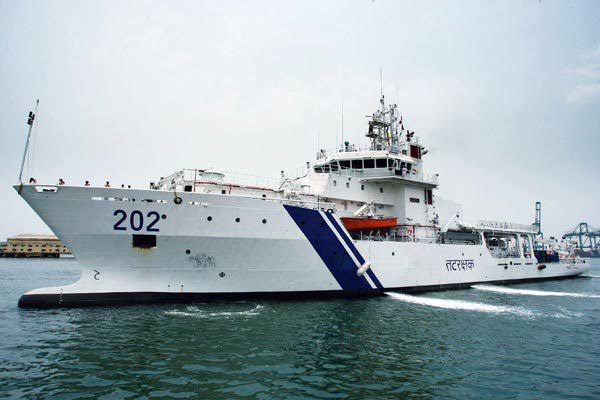
- ICGS Samudra Paheredar

History

India
- Name: ICGS Samudra Paheredar
- Owner: Indian Coast Guard
- Builder: ABG Ship Yard Pvt. Ltd
- Status: in active service

Class overview

General characteristics
- Type: Samudra-class Pollution Control Vessel
- Speed: 21 knots (39 km/h; 24 mph)

ICGS Samudra Paheredar is an Indian pollution control vessel (PCV).

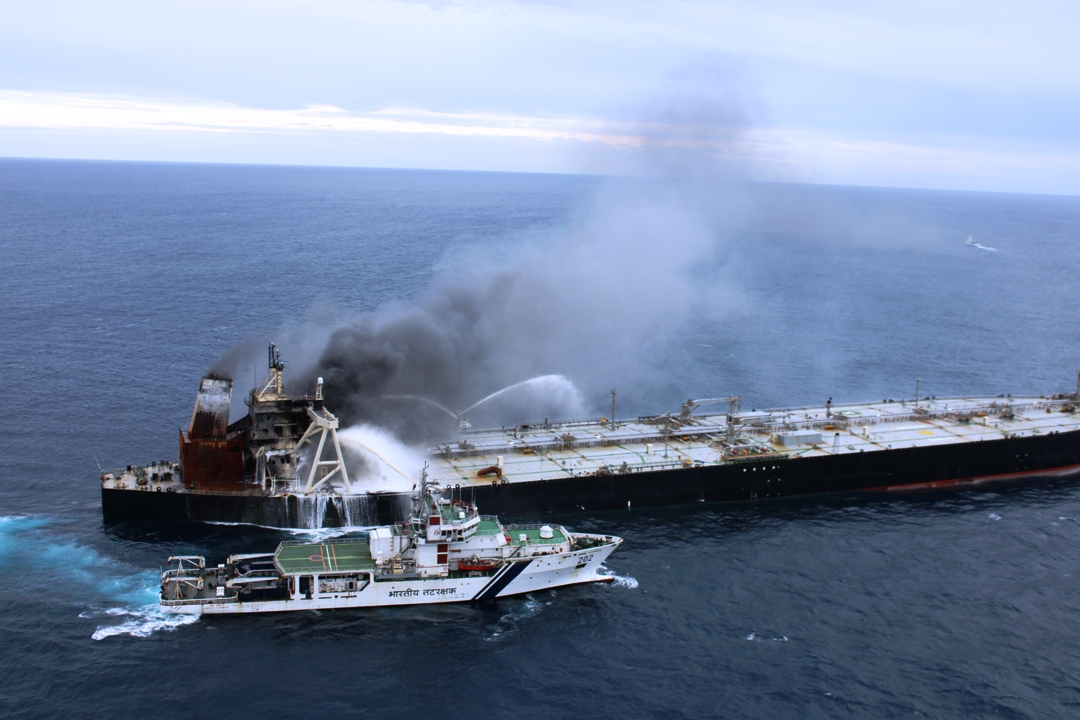
ICGS Samudra Paheredar dousing fire onboard MT New Diamond

The ship was commissioned by then Chief of the Naval Staff Admiral Nirmal Verma in July 2012 in Gujarat. The vessel takes care of the east coast of India and can go up to a speed of 21 knots. It is the second pollution control vessel of India (first being ICGS Samudra Prahari) and was built by ABG Ship Yard Pvt. Ltd. A practice run of the recovery of CARE mission in 2014 was done on 31 October 2014 with Indian Coast Guard ship ICGS Samudra Pahredar. In 2020, ICGS Samudra Paheredar visited Muscat, Doha and Riyadh and Dubai. In Dubai, the vessel underwent joint training with UAE Navy. On 2 April 2024, Samudra Paheredar visited Ho Chi Minh City, Vietnam as part of a deployment with ASEAN and to bolster relations with those nations. The Samudra Paheredar exercised with the Vietnam Coast Guard as part of this diplomatic visit.
