= Rampal Majra =

Indian politician

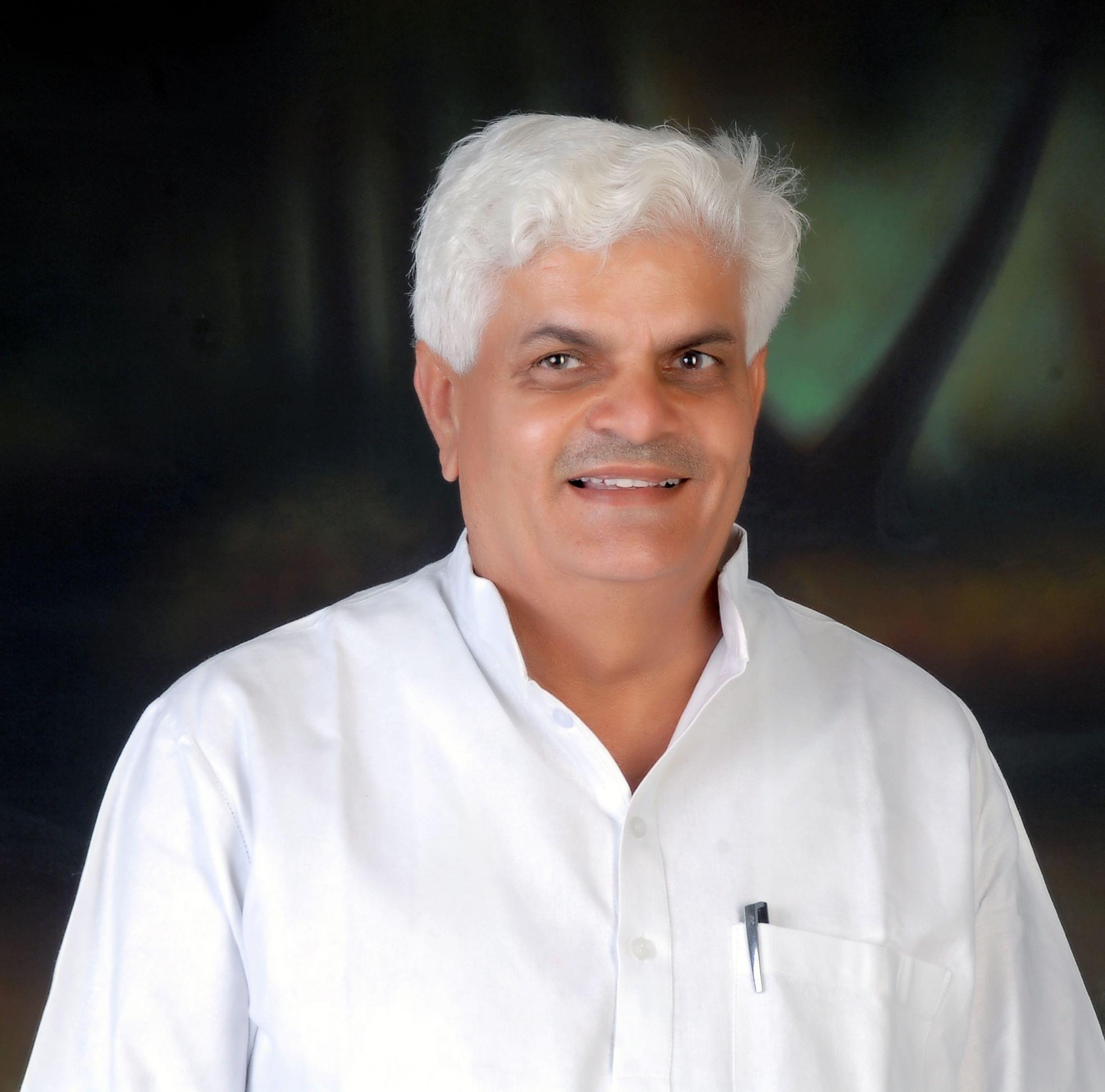

Haryana State President, Indian National Lok Dal
- Incumbent
- Assumed office 20 March 2024
- National President: Om Prakash Chautala
- Secretary General: Abhay Singh Chautala
- State Vice-President: Habib Ur Rehman; Rekha Rana; Rao Hoshiar Singh; Bhopal Singh Bhati; Raj Singh Mor
- Preceded by: Nafe Singh Rathee

Chief Parliamentary Secretary, Government of Haryana
- In office 3 March 2000 – 5 March 2005
- Ministries and Departments: Irrigation & Water Resources

Member of the Haryana Legislative Assembly
- In office 13 October 2009 – 15 October 2014
- Constituency: Kalayat
- In office 22 February 2000 – 27 February 2005
- Constituency: Pai
- In office 21 March 1991 – 11 May 1996
- Constituency: Pai

Personal details
- Born: 19 November 1954 (age 71) Majra Nand Karan, Kaithal, Kaithal, Haryana, India
- Spouse: Smt. Chameli Devi
- Children: 2 Sons
- Occupation: Politician
- Profession: Agriculture

Rampal Majra is an Indian politician from Haryana and the State President of the Indian National Lok Dal. He has served as a Chief Parliamentary Secretary in the Government of Haryana. He is a three-time former Member of the Haryana Legislative Assembly.

== Personal life ==
He was born in his village of Marja in the Katihal district of Haryana in 1954. He's married to Chameli Devi and has two children.

== Education ==
He completed his B.A., LL.B, B.Ed. from Kaithal, Doon College of Law, Sunderpur. He speaks Hindi, English, Punjabi and Sanskrit.

== Political career ==
Rampal Majra, a member of the District Bar Association, first became the sarpanch of village Majra in 1978. He became an MLA for the first time in the 1996 elections, contesting the first election from Pai Assembly of Kaithal district on the ticket of Samata Party. He secured 24291 votes and defeated rival Haryana Vikas Party candidate Narsingh Dhanda by a margin of 2275 votes. In the year 2000, Majra defeated Tejendra Pal Mann of Congress by 6596 votes on INLD ticket. In 2005, Tejendra Pal Mann contested as an independent and defeated INLD candidate Rampal Majra by a margin of 6502 votes. After this, the pai Assembly was broken in the delimitation and included in the Pundri and the reserved Kalayat Assembly was opened. On this, Majra contested the 2009 election on INLD ticket from Kalayat Assembly and became MLA for the third time by defeating rival Tejendrapal Mann by a margin of 9400 votes. Tejendra Pal had contested this election on an Indian National Congress ticket. In the 2014 elections, independent candidate Jai Parkash defeated him by a margin of 8390 votes. After 40 years of his political career with the Devi lal Family, he briefly quit INLD, only to rejoin it and becoming State President of the party's Haryana Unit. of Haryana in 2019 and joined BJP. He resigned from Bhartiya Janta Party on 28 January 2021 in protest of the three farmers bills introduced by Government of India.
