= List of leaders of the opposition in the Haryana Legislative Assembly =

LOP in Haryana assembly

Leader of the Opposition of the Haryana Legislative Assembly
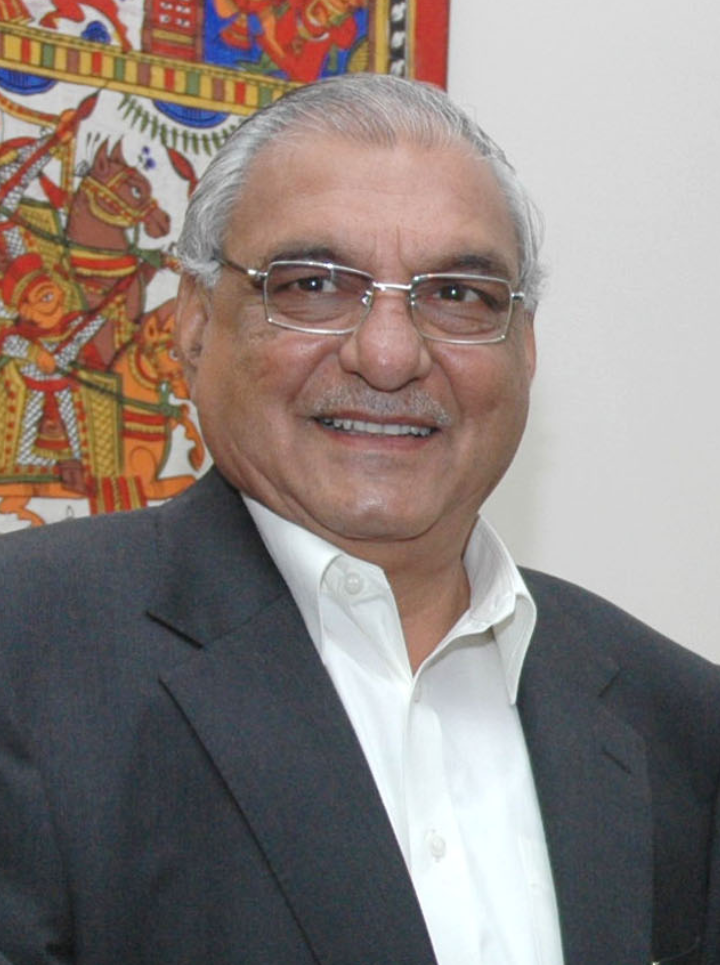
- Incumbent; Bhupinder Singh Hooda since 29 September 2025
- Style: The Hon’ble
- Member of: Haryana Legislative Assembly
- Nominator: Members of the Official Opposition of the Legislative Assembly
- Appointer: Speaker of the Assembly
- Term length: 5 years Till the Assembly Continues

The leader of the opposition in the Haryana Legislative Assembly is the politician who leads the official opposition in the Haryana Legislative Assembly.

== Eligibility ==
Official Opposition is a term used in Haryana Legislative Assembly to designate the political party which has secured the second largest number of seats in the assembly. In order to get formal recognition, the party must have at least 10% of total membership of the Legislative Assembly as an individual party, and not as an alliance.

== Role ==
In legislature, opposition party has a major role and must act to discourage the party in power from acting against the interests of the state and the common man. They are expected to alert the population and the government on the content of any bill, which is not in the best interests of the state.

== List of leaders of the opposition ==
No.	Portrait	Name	Constituency	Term		Assembly (Election)	Party
1		Shamsher Singh Surjewala	Narwana	1977	1979	5th Assembly (1977)	Indian National Congress
2		Devi Lal	Bhattu Kalan	1979	1980	5th Assembly (1977)	Janata Party
3		Chandrawati	Badhra	1982	1987	6th Assembly (1982)	Lok Dal
4	Vacant			1987	1991	7th Assembly (1987)	No Official Opposition
5		Sampat Singh	Bhattu Kalan	1991	1996	8th Assembly (1991)	Janata Party
6		Om Prakash Chautala	Rori	24 March 1996	1999	9th Assembly (1996)	Samata Party
7		Bansi Lal	Tosham	1999	2000	9th Assembly (1996)	Haryana Vikas Party
8		Bhupinder Singh Hooda	Kiloi	2001	2004	10th Assembly (2000)	Indian National Congress
(6)		Om Prakash Chautala	Rori	27 February 2005	21 August 2009	11th Assembly (2005)	Indian National Lok Dal
(6)		Om Prakash Chautala	Rori	17 November 2009	27 October 2014	12th Assembly (2009)	Indian National Lok Dal
9		Abhay Singh Chautala	Ellenabad	5 November 2014	23 March 2019	13th Assembly (2014)	Indian National Lok Dal
10		Kiran Choudhry	Tosham	24 March 2019	3 September 2019	13th Assembly (2014)	Indian National Congress
(8)		Bhupinder Singh Hooda	Garhi Sampla-Kiloi	4 September 2019	27 October 2019	14th Assembly (2019)	Indian National Congress
(8)		Bhupinder Singh Hooda	Garhi Sampla-Kiloi	2 November 2019	12 September 2024	14th Assembly (2019)	Indian National Congress
(8)		Bhupinder Singh Hooda	Garhi Sampla-Kiloi	29 September 2025	Incumbent	15th Assembly (2024)	Indian National Congress

== See also ==
- Government of Haryana
- Governor of Haryana
- Chief Minister of Haryana
- Haryana Legislative Assembly
- List of current Indian opposition leaders
