= Rajinder Singh Joon =

Indian politician (born 1956)

Member of Haryana Legislative Assembly
- In office 2019–2024
- Preceded by: Naresh Kaushik
- Succeeded by: Rajesh Joon
- Constituency: Bahadurgarh
- In office 2005–2014
- Preceded by: Nafe Singh Rathee
- Succeeded by: Naresh Kaushik
- Constituency: Bahadurgarh

Personal details
- Party: Indian National Congress

Rajinder Singh Joon (born 15 August 1956) is an Indian politician from Haryana. He is a former MLA from Bahadurgarh Assembly constituency in Jhajjar district. He won the 2019 Haryana Legislative Assembly election representing the Indian National Congress.

== Early life and education ==
Singh is from Bahadurgarh, Haryana. His father Ch. Surajmal Joon was a former MLA from Bahadurgarh. He completed his B.A. in 1977 at Hindu College, Delhi which is affiliated with Delhi University.

== Career ==
Singh won from Bahadurgarh Assembly constituency representing the Indian National Congress in the 2019 Haryana Legislative Assembly election. He polled 55,825 votes and defeated his nearest rival, Naresh Kaushik of the Bharatiya Janata Party, by a margin of 15,491 votes. Singh lost in 2024 to Rajesh Joon.
