= Arjun Chautala =

Indian politician

Arjun Singh Chautala

Member of the Haryana Legislative Assembly
- Incumbent
- Assumed office 8 October 2024
- Preceded by: Ranjit Singh Chautala
- Constituency: Rania

Personal details
- Political party: Indian National Lok Dal
- Relations: Abhay Singh Chautala (father), Dushyant Chautala (cousin), Om Prakash Chautala (grandfather), Devi Lal (great-grandfather)
- Profession: Politician

Arjun Singh Chautala is an Indian politician, who is serving as a Member of the Haryana Legislative Assembly from the Rania constituency. He is a member of the Indian National Lok Dal, and son of the party leader, Abhay Singh Chautala.

== Early life ==
Arjun was born to Abhay Singh Chautala and Kanta Chautala in 1993. His father has served as the Leader of Opposition of the Haryana Legislative Assembly from 2014 to 2019.

He is the grandson of former Haryana Chief Minister, Om Prakash Chautala and great-grandson of former Deputy Prime Minister of India, Devi Lal. His elder brother, Karan Singh Chautala, is the chairman of the Sirsa District Council.

== See also ==
- 2024 Haryana Legislative Assembly election
- Haryana Legislative Assembly
