= Anand Singh Dangi =

Member of the assembly in Haryana, India

Member of Haryana Legislative Assembly
- In office 2005–2019
- Preceded by: Balbir
- Succeeded by: Balraj Kundu
- Constituency: Meham
- In office 1991–1996
- Preceded by: Devi Lal
- Succeeded by: Balbir
- Constituency: Meham

Personal details
- Born: 27 January 1952 (age 74) Meham, Rohtak, East Punjab, India
- Party: Indian National Congress
- Spouse: Sona Devi Dangi
- Children: 3
- Education: Punjab University

Anand Singh Dangi was a member of the Haryana Legislative Assembly from the Indian National Congress representing the Meham Vidhan sabha Constituency in Haryana.
