= INLD Students Organization =

Youth wing of Indian National Lok Dal (INLD)

- President: Arjun Singh Chautala
- Secretary General: Raman Dhaka
- Founded: 2019
- Preceded by: Indian National Students Organisation (INSO)
- Headquarters: MLA Flat No. 47, Sector-4, Chandigarh, India - 160004
- Mother party: Indian National Lok Dal

The Indian National Lok Dal Students Organization (ISO) is the youth wing of the Indian National Lok Dal, one of the main political parties based in the Indian state of Haryana.

== History ==
In October 2018, Om Prakash Chautala, the National President of the Indian National Lok Dal (INLD), dissolved the INLD's student wing, formerly known as the Indian National Students Organisation (INSO), and the party's youth wing. This decision was made due to their perceived lack of discipline and commitment to the party's ideals. This was during the INLD-JJP split that occurred during that time.

Arjun Singh Chautala, the son of Abhay Singh Chautala, is the current president of the ISO. Raman Dhaka is the current Secretary General.

== List of presidents ==
#	Portrait	Name	Tenure		At age of
1		Arjun Singh Chautala	2019	Incumbent	26
