= Bahadurgarh Assembly constituency =

Legislative Assembly constituency in Haryana State, India

Coordinates: 28.69°N 76.93°E

Bahadurgarh
- Constituency No. 64 for the Haryana Legislative Assembly

Constituency details
- Country: India
- Region: North India
- State: Haryana
- District: Jhajjar
- Lok Sabha constituency: Rohtak
- Total electors: 2,43,180
- Reservation: None

Member of Legislative Assembly
- 15th Haryana Legislative Assembly
- Incumbent Rajesh Joon
- Party: Independent

Bahadurgarh Assembly constituency is one of the 90 Legislative Assembly constituencies of Haryana state in northern India.

It is part of Jhajjar district. Rajesh Joon is the current MLA from Bahadurgarh.

== Members of the Legislative Assembly ==
| Year | Member | Party |
|---|---|---|
| 1967 | Hardwari Lal Dalal | Independent |
| 1968 | Partap Singh Chhikara | Indian National Congress |
| 1972 | Hardwari Lal Dalal | Indian National Congress (O) |
| 1977 | Mehar Singh Rathee | Janata Party |
| 1982 | Mange Ram Rathee | Lokdal |
| 1987 | Mange Ram Rathee | Lokdal |
| 1991 | Suraj Mal Joon | Indian National Congress |
| 1996 | Nafe Singh Rathee | Samata Party |
| 2000 | Nafe Singh Rathee | Indian National Lok Dal |
| 2005 | Rajinder Singh Joon | Indian National Congress |
| 2009 | Rajinder Singh Joon | Indian National Congress |
| 2014 | Naresh Kaushik | Bharatiya Janata Party |
| 2019 | Rajinder Singh Joon | Indian National Congress |
| 2024 | Rajesh Joon | Independent |

== Election results ==
=== Assembly Election 2024 ===
2024 Haryana Legislative Assembly election: Bahadurgarh
| Party | Candidate | Votes | % | ±% |
|---|---|---|---|---|
| Independent | Rajesh Joon | 73,191 | 46.00 | New |
| BJP | Dinesh Kaushik | 31,192 | 19.61 | ▼9.85 |
| INC | Rajinder Singh Joon | 28,955 | 18.20 | ▼22.57 |
| INLD | Sheela Nafe Singh Rathee | 17,511 | 11.01 | ▼7.10 |
| Independent | Ramesh Dalal | 4,745 | 2.98 | New |
| AAP | Kuldeep Singh Chhikara | 966 | 0.61 | ▼1.06 |
| NOTA | None of the Above | 564 | 0.35 | New |
| Margin of victory | | 41,999 | 26.40 | ▲15.09 |
| Turnout | | 1,59,100 | 64.68 | ▲1.88 |
| Registered electors | | 2,43,180 | | ▲12.80 |
| Independent gain from INC | | Swing | ▲5.24 | |

=== Assembly Election 2019 ===
2019 Haryana Legislative Assembly election: Bahadurgarh
| Party | Candidate | Votes | % | ±% |
|---|---|---|---|---|
| INC | Rajinder Singh Joon | 55,825 | 40.77 | ▲15.50 |
| BJP | Naresh Kaushik | 40,334 | 29.45 | ▲0.50 |
| INLD | Nafe Singh Rathee | 24,799 | 18.11 | ▲12.35 |
| JJP | Sanjay Dalal | 5,495 | 4.01 | New |
| LSP | Kishan Lal Panchal | 3,545 | 2.59 | New |
| BSP | Ashish | 2,540 | 1.85 | ▲0.81 |
| AAP | Anita | 2,280 | 1.66 | New |
| Margin of victory | | 15,491 | 11.31 | ▲7.63 |
| Turnout | | 1,36,939 | 62.80 | ▼8.31 |
| Registered electors | | 2,18,065 | | ▲17.11 |
| INC gain from BJP | | Swing | ▲11.81 | |

=== Assembly Election 2014 ===
2014 Haryana Legislative Assembly election: Bahadurgarh
| Party | Candidate | Votes | % | ±% |
|---|---|---|---|---|
| BJP | Naresh Kaushik | 38,341 | 28.96 | ▲21.41 |
| INC | Rajinder Singh Joon | 33,459 | 25.27 | ▼18.01 |
| Independent | Rajesh Joon | 28,242 | 21.33 | New |
| Independent | Nafe Singh Rathee | 20,105 | 15.18 | New |
| INLD | Teja Pehlawan | 7,627 | 5.76 | ▼15.84 |
| BSP | Gajanand Sharma | 1,381 | 1.04 | ▼1.50 |
| Margin of victory | | 4,882 | 3.69 | ▼17.99 |
| Turnout | | 1,32,404 | 71.11 | ▲4.59 |
| Registered electors | | 1,86,207 | | ▲38.73 |
| BJP gain from INC | | Swing | ▼14.32 | |

=== Assembly Election 2009 ===
2009 Haryana Legislative Assembly election: Bahadurgarh
| Party | Candidate | Votes | % | ±% |
|---|---|---|---|---|
| INC | Rajinder Singh Joon | 38,641 | 43.28 | ▲2.97 |
| INLD | Nafe Singh Rathee | 19,289 | 21.60 | ▼13.73 |
| Haryana Swantra Party | Ramesh Dalal | 15,848 | 17.75 | New |
| BJP | Naresh Malik | 6,735 | 7.54 | ▲5.34 |
| HJC(BL) | Raj Singh | 4,178 | 4.68 | New |
| BSP | Anil Kumar | 2,270 | 2.54 | ▲1.28 |
| Independent | Ajit Jangra | 832 | 0.93 | New |
| Rashtriya Arya Raj Sabha | Mahesh Arya | 613 | 0.69 | New |
| Margin of victory | | 19,352 | 21.68 | ▲16.70 |
| Turnout | | 89,281 | 66.51 | ▲2.55 |
| Registered electors | | 1,34,227 | | ▼16.23 |
| INC hold | | Swing | ▲2.97 | |

=== Assembly Election 2005 ===
2005 Haryana Legislative Assembly election: Bahadurgarh
| Party | Candidate | Votes | % | ±% |
|---|---|---|---|---|
| INC | Rajinder Singh Joon | 41,313 | 40.31 | ▼6.68 |
| INLD | Nafe Singh Rathee | 36,217 | 35.34 | ▼13.78 |
| Independent | Ashok Kumar | 12,890 | 12.58 | New |
| Independent | Jitender Singh | 5,759 | 5.62 | New |
| BJP | Rajender Kumar Dalal S/O Tek Ram | 2,259 | 2.20 | New |
| BSP | Mahender Singh | 1,299 | 1.27 | New |
| Independent | Raj Singh | 991 | 0.97 | New |
| Independent | Daljeet Singh | 820 | 0.80 | New |
| Margin of victory | | 5,096 | 4.97 | ▲2.85 |
| Turnout | | 1,02,486 | 63.96 | ▲3.50 |
| Registered electors | | 1,60,225 | | ▲23.33 |
| INC gain from INLD | | Swing | ▼8.80 | |

=== Assembly Election 2000 ===
2000 Haryana Legislative Assembly election: Bahadurgarh
| Party | Candidate | Votes | % | ±% |
|---|---|---|---|---|
| INLD | Nafe Singh Rathee | 38,582 | 49.11 | New |
| INC | Ramesh Dalal | 36,915 | 46.99 | ▲30.20 |
| Independent | Ram Phal | 1,233 | 1.57 | New |
| Margin of victory | | 1,667 | 2.12 | ▲1.02 |
| Turnout | | 78,555 | 61.31 | ▼0.41 |
| Registered electors | | 1,29,919 | | ▼3.05 |
| INLD gain from SAP | | Swing | | |

=== Assembly Election 1996 ===
1996 Haryana Legislative Assembly election: Bahadurgarh
| Party | Candidate | Votes | % | ±% |
|---|---|---|---|---|
| SAP | Nafe Singh RatheeS/O Umrao Singh | 27,555 | 33.78 | New |
| HVP | Raj Pal | 26,657 | 32.68 | ▲19.59 |
| INC | Suraj Mal | 13,700 | 16.79 | ▼14.10 |
| Independent | Bikanu | 4,301 | 5.27 | New |
| Independent | Karan Singh | 3,053 | 3.74 | New |
| JP | Mahinder S/O Sis Ram | 3,012 | 3.69 | ▼22.23 |
| Janhit Morcha | Bhagwan Dass | 1,305 | 1.60 | New |
| Independent | Naresh Kaushik | 447 | 0.55 | New |
| Margin of victory | | 898 | 1.10 | ▼3.87 |
| Turnout | | 81,572 | 63.58 | ▲3.73 |
| Registered electors | | 1,34,002 | | ▲12.90 |
| SAP gain from INC | | Swing | ▲2.88 | |

=== Assembly Election 1991 ===
1991 Haryana Legislative Assembly election: Bahadurgarh
| Party | Candidate | Votes | % | ±% |
|---|---|---|---|---|
| INC | Suraj Mal | 20,956 | 30.90 | ▲10.16 |
| JP | Kaptan Chait Ram | 17,583 | 25.93 | New |
| HVP | Mehar Singh Rathi | 8,877 | 13.09 | New |
| Independent | Harkishan | 8,841 | 13.04 | New |
| Independent | Harkishan S/O Jagat Ram | 5,999 | 8.85 | New |
| BJP | Sat Prakash | 2,743 | 4.04 | New |
| Independent | Rajender Singh | 949 | 1.40 | New |
| Independent | Mahabir Singh | 758 | 1.12 | New |
| Margin of victory | | 3,373 | 4.97 | ▼30.53 |
| Turnout | | 67,819 | 58.91 | ▼9.27 |
| Registered electors | | 1,18,691 | | ▲10.52 |
| INC gain from LKD | | Swing | ▼25.35 | |

=== Assembly Election 1987 ===
1987 Haryana Legislative Assembly election: Bahadurgarh
| Party | Candidate | Votes | % | ±% |
|---|---|---|---|---|
| LKD | Mange Ram | 40,113 | 56.25 | ▲5.60 |
| INC | Meher Singh | 14,793 | 20.74 | ▼12.51 |
| Independent | Harkishan | 14,080 | 19.74 | New |
| Independent | Bijender | 768 | 1.08 | New |
| Independent | Partap Singh | 765 | 1.07 | New |
| Margin of victory | | 25,320 | 35.51 | ▲18.11 |
| Turnout | | 71,312 | 67.28 | ▲1.06 |
| Registered electors | | 1,07,389 | | ▲19.81 |
| LKD hold | | Swing | ▲5.60 | |

=== Assembly Election 1982 ===
1982 Haryana Legislative Assembly election: Bahadurgarh
| Party | Candidate | Votes | % | ±% |
|---|---|---|---|---|
| LKD | Mange Ram S/O Daryao Singh | 29,668 | 50.65 | New |
| INC | Priya Vart | 19,477 | 33.25 | ▲9.59 |
| Independent | Mange Ram S/O Hazari Lal | 4,630 | 7.90 | New |
| Independent | Suraj Bhan | 2,898 | 4.95 | New |
| Independent | Ramesh Dalal | 331 | 0.57 | New |
| IC(S) | Krishan | 311 | 0.53 | New |
| Independent | Man Mohan | 310 | 0.53 | New |
| Margin of victory | | 10,191 | 17.40 | ▼4.63 |
| Turnout | | 58,571 | 66.24 | ▲5.32 |
| Registered electors | | 89,633 | | ▲20.28 |
| LKD gain from JP | | Swing | ▲2.07 | |

=== Assembly Election 1977 ===
1977 Haryana Legislative Assembly election: Bahadurgarh
| Party | Candidate | Votes | % | ±% |
|---|---|---|---|---|
| JP | Mehar Singh | 21,732 | 48.59 | New |
| Independent | Mange Ram | 11,878 | 26.56 | New |
| INC | Suraj Mal | 10,584 | 23.66 | ▼23.26 |
| Independent | Radhe Sham | 401 | 0.90 | New |
| Margin of victory | | 9,854 | 22.03 | ▲21.23 |
| Turnout | | 44,729 | 60.52 | ▼6.03 |
| Registered electors | | 74,518 | | ▼0.03 |
| JP gain from INC(O) | | Swing | ▲0.87 | |

=== Assembly Election 1972 ===
1972 Haryana Legislative Assembly election: Bahadurgarh
| Party | Candidate | Votes | % | ±% |
|---|---|---|---|---|
| INC(O) | Hardwari Lal | 23,495 | 47.72 | New |
| INC | Mehar Singh | 23,100 | 46.92 | ▼6.91 |
| SUCI(C) | Jai Karan | 2,640 | 5.36 | New |
| Margin of victory | | 395 | 0.80 | ▼9.26 |
| Turnout | | 49,235 | 67.42 | ▼1.34 |
| Registered electors | | 74,540 | | ▲14.01 |
| INC(O) gain from INC | | Swing | | |

=== Assembly Election 1968 ===
1968 Haryana Legislative Assembly election: Bahadurgarh
| Party | Candidate | Votes | % | ±% |
|---|---|---|---|---|
| INC | Partap Singh | 23,714 | 53.82 | ▼3.06 |
| SWA | Hardwari Lal | 19,279 | 43.76 | New |
| Independent | Ram Narain | 1,066 | 2.42 | New |
| Margin of victory | | 4,435 | 10.07 | |
| Turnout | | 44,059 | 68.50 | |
| Registered electors | | 65,380 | | |
| INC gain from Independent | | Swing | | |

=== Assembly Election 1967 ===
1967 Haryana Legislative Assembly election: Bahadurgarh
| Party | Candidate | Votes | % | ±% |
|---|---|---|---|---|
| Independent | Hardwari Lal | 29,172 | | New |
| INC | Hardwari Lal | 24,737 | 56.88 | New |
| INC | Hari Singh | 15,401 | | New |
| Independent | Hari Singh | 11,726 | 26.96 | New |
| ABJS | J. Narain | 4,810 | 11.06 | New |
| SSP | Sultan | 1,179 | 2.71 | New |
| Independent | Sultan | 962 | | New |
| Independent | S. Singh | 724 | 1.66 | New |
| Independent | Pirthi | 315 | 0.72 | New |
| Margin of victory | | 4,435 | | |
| Independent win (new seat) | | | | |

== See also ==
- List of constituencies of the Haryana Legislative Assembly
- Jhajjar district
