= Rahish Khan =

Indian politician

Member of the Haryana Legislative Assembly
- In office 2014–2019
- Preceded by: Mohammad Ilyas
- Succeeded by: Mohammad Ilyas
- Constituency: Punahana

Personal details
- Party: Independent
- Other political affiliations: Bharatiya Janata Party
- Profession: Politician

Rahish Khan is an Indian politician from Haryana. He is a former Member of the Haryana Legislative Assembly from 2014, represented from Punahana Assembly constituency.

== Legislative Assembly Elections ==
Year	Party	Constituency Name	Result	Votes gained	Vote share	Margin
2009	IND	Punahana	Lost	9,774	12.03%	9091
2014	IND	Punahana	Won	34,281	29.56%	3,141
2019	IND	Punahana	Lost	34,276	28.09%	816
2024	IND	Punahana	Lost	53,384	36.49%	31,916
