= Abhay Singh Chautala =

Indian politician

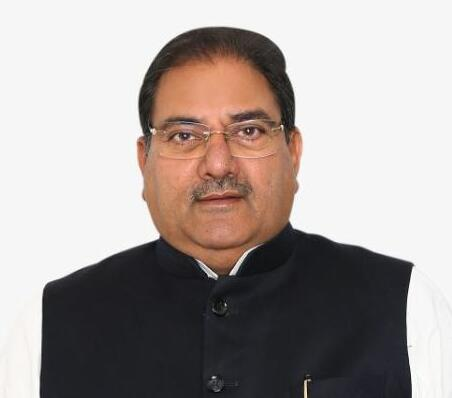

Member of the Haryana Legislative Assembly
- In office 24 January 2010 – 8 October 2024
- Preceded by: Om Prakash Chautala
- Succeeded by: Bharat Singh Beniwal
- Constituency: Ellenabad

Leader of Opposition Haryana Legislative Assembly
- In office October 2014 – March 2019
- Preceded by: Om Prakash Chautala
- Succeeded by: Kiran Choudhry

10th President of Indian Olympic Association
- In office 5 December 2012 – 9 February 2014
- Preceded by: Vijay Kumar Malhotra (acting president)
- Succeeded by: Narayana Ramachandran

President of the Indian National Lok Dal
- Incumbent
- Assumed office 25 March 2025
- Preceded by: Om Prakash Chautala

Personal details
- Born: 14 February 1963 (age 63) Chautala, Punjab, India (now in Haryana, India)
- Party: Indian National Lok Dal
- Spouse(s): Supriya (m. 1987; died 1988) Kanta Chautala
- Relations: Chaudhary Devi Lal (grandfather); Ajay Singh Chautala (brother); Dushyant Chautala (nephew)
- Children: 2, including Arjun Chautala
- Parent: Om Prakash Chautala (father)
- Occupation: Politician

Abhay Singh Chautala (born 14 February 1963) is an Indian politician. He was a member of the Haryana Legislative Assembly from Ellenabad. He served as Leader of the Opposition in Haryana Legislative Assembly from 2014 to 2019. He has been elected to the Haryana Legislative Assembly for four terms since 2010. He served as the 10th president of Indian Olympic Association. He also served as president of the Boxing Federation of India. He is grandson of Devi Lal, former deputy prime minister of India. He is the current president of Indian National Lok Dal.

== Early life and education ==
Chautala was born on 14 February 1963 in Chautala village of Sirsa district in the Indian state of Haryana. He studied at S.M. Hindu Senior Secondary School, Sonipat. He did Bachelor of Arts from Chaudhary Charan Singh Haryana Agricultural University. He has represented the state eight times in the national volleyball championship and won numerous medals.

== Political career ==
Chautala started his political career by getting elected as Upsarpanch (Deputy Sarpanch) of Chautala village. His notable ascent in the political arena came to the forefront in the year 2000 when he helped his father to clinch victory from Haryana's Rori Assembly constituency under the banner of the Indian National Lok Dal (INLD).

In 2005, Chautala became the president of the District Council of Sirsa. In 2010, he emerged victorious in the Ellenabad Assembly constituency by-election following the arrest of his father, Om Prakash Chautala and his brother, Ajay Singh Chautala.

After securing re-election as a Member of the Legislative Assembly (MLA) in 2014, Chautala assumed the role of the Leader of Opposition within the Haryana Legislative Assembly. During the 2014 Indian general elections, Chautala guided the Indian National Lok Dal (INLD) to secure 2 Lok Sabha seats amidst a formidable electoral surge favouring the Narendra Modi-led Bharatiya Janata Party wave.

On 27 January 2021, Chautala resigned as the sole MLA from the party citing the BJP-led Union government’s refusal to accept farmers’ demands. He was later re-elected from the Ellenabad constituency in a bypoll election on 2 November 2021. Chautala lost the seat to Bharat Singh Beniwal of the Indian National Congress in the 2024 Haryana Legislative Assembly election.

In April 2024, Chautala was nominated by his party to contest the 2024 Indian general election from the Kurukshetra constitiuency of Haryana, but he lost the election to Naveen Jindal of the Bharatiya Janata Party.

On 25 March 2025, he became the national president of the Indian National Lok Dal, succeeding his father Om Prakash Chautala.

== Positions held in sports organisations ==
Position	Organization	Year
President	Haryana Olympic Association	2016-till date 1999-2012 1991-1995
President	Haryana State Athletic Association	2013-till date 1996-2008
President	Haryana State Boxing Association	2000-till date
Chairman	Indian Amateur Boxing Federation	2012-2016
Patron in Chief	All India Tug of War Federation	2008-2014
President	Indian Olympic Association	2012-2014
President	Indian Boxing Federation	2001-2012
Chef-De-Mission	Indian Contingent, Guangzhou (China) Asian Games	2010
Member	Organizing Committee, Commonwealth Games-2010 Delhi	2010
Vice-President	Asian Boxing Federation	2004-2011
Vice-President	Indian Olympic Association	1991-2012
President	Haryana State Volleyball Association	1991-2000
Secretary General	Haryana State Volleyball Association	1985-1991

== Personal life ==
He married Supriya in March 1987, but she died under suspicious circumstances at the age of 19 on 11 November 1988. Later, he married Kanta Chautala and has two sons, Karan Singh Chautala and Arjun Singh Chautala.

Civic offices
Preceded by Vijay Kumar Malhotra	President of Indian Olympic Association; 2012–2014	Succeeded by Narayana Ramachandran
