= Chief Minister of Haryana =

Leader of the executive branch of Government of Haryana

- Emblem of Haryana

- Flag of India

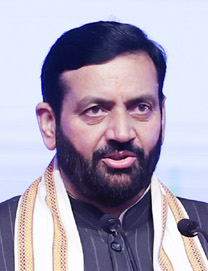
- Incumbent; Nayab Singh Saini since 12 March 2024
- Chief Minister's Office; Government of Haryana
- Style: The Honourable (formal); Mr. Chief Minister (informal)
- Type: Leader of the Executive
- Status: Head of government
- Abbreviation: CMoHaryana
- Member of: State Cabinet; Legislative Assembly
- Reports to: Governor of Haryana; Haryana Legislative Assembly
- Residence: 1, Sector-3, Chandigarh
- Seat: Chandigarh
- Nominator: MLAs of the majority party or alliance
- Appointer: Governor of Haryana; by convention based on appointees ability to command confidence in the Legislative Assembly
- Term length: At the confidence of the assembly; Chief minister's term is for five years and is subject to no term limits.
- Precursor: Chief Minister of Punjab
- Inaugural holder: Bhagwat Dayal Sharma
- Formation: 1 November 1966 (60 years ago)
- Deputy: Deputy Chief Minister
- Salary: ₹288,000 (US$3,000)/monthly; ₹3,456,000 (US$36,000)/annually
- Website: Office of the Chief Minister

The chief minister of Haryana is the chief executive of the Indian state of Haryana. As per the Constitution of India, the governor is a state's de jure head, but de facto executive authority rests with the chief minister. Following elections to the Haryana Legislative Assembly, the state's governor usually invites the party (or coalition) with a majority of seats to form the government. The governor appoints the chief minister, whose council of ministers are collectively responsible to the assembly. Given that they have the confidence of the assembly, the chief minister's term is for five years and is not subjected to any term limits.Chief Minister also serves as Leader of the House in the Legislative Assembly.

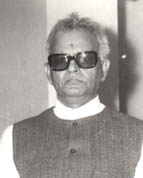
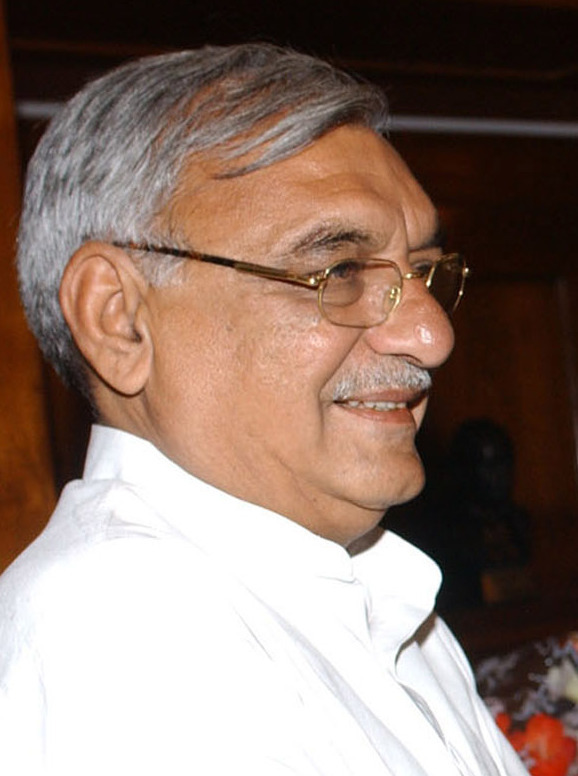
- Left: Bhagwat Dayal Sharma was the 1st chief minister of Haryana.
- Centre: Bhajan Lal Bishnoi was the longest chief minister in Haryana history.
- Right: Bhupinder Singh Hooda was the first chief minister who complete a second term, making him the longest-incumbent Chief Minister in Haryana’s history.

Eleven people have served as the state's chief minister since Haryana's formation in 1966. The first was B. D. Sharma of the Indian National Congress party. Bhajan Lal Bishnoi is Haryana's longest-serving chief minister; he held office for 11 years and 10 months (4317 days). Bansi Lal the 3rd chief minister is the state's second longest-serving chief minister. Devi Lal, the fifth chief minister of Haryana, went on to twice serve as Deputy Prime Minister of India, under prime ministers V. P. Singh and Chandra Shekhar. Om Prakash Chautala served the most discontinuous stints as chief minister (four), as a member of three different parties (he was first Never-INC associated member to occupy the post). Bhupinder Singh Hooda is the only Chief Minister in the state’s history to have completed two consecutive terms in office, making him the third longest-serving chief minister of Haryana. The incumbent chief minister is Nayab Singh Saini, the second officeholder from the Bharatiya Janata Party, who was sworn in on 12 March 2024.

== Chief ministers of Haryana (1966-present) ==
#	Portrait	Name	Constituency	Term of office			Assembly (Elections)	Party (Note: This column only names the chief minister's party. The state government he headed may have been a complex coalition of several parties and independents; these are not listed here.)
1	Bhagwat Dayal Sharma	Bhagwat Dayal Sharma	Jhajjar	1 November 1966	21 February 1967	143 days	1st (1962 elections)	Indian National Congress
1	Bhagwat Dayal Sharma	Bhagwat Dayal Sharma	Jhajjar	21 February 1967	24 March 1967	143 days	2nd (1967 elections)	Indian National Congress
2	Birender Singh	Rao Birender Singh	Pataudi	24 March 1967	20 November 1967	241 days	2nd (1967 elections)	Vishal Haryana Party
–	Emblem of India	Vacant (Note: President's rule may be imposed when the "government in a state is not able to function as per the Constitution", which often happens because no party or coalition has a majority in the assembly. When President's rule is in force in a state, its council of ministers stands dissolved. The office of chief minister thus lies vacant, and the administration is taken over by the governor, who functions on behalf of the central government. At times, the legislative assembly also stands dissolved.) (President's rule)	N/A	20 November 1967	21 May 1968	183 days	Dissolved	N/A
3		Bansi Lal	Tosham	21 May 1968	14 March 1972	7 years, 194 days	3rd (1968 elections)	Indian National Congress
3		Bansi Lal	Tosham	14 March 1972	1 December 1975	7 years, 194 days	4th (1972 elections)	Indian National Congress
4	Banarsi Das Gupta	Banarsi Das Gupta	Bhiwani	1 December 1975	30 April 1977	1 year, 150 days	4th (1972 elections)	Indian National Congress
–	Emblem of India	Vacant (President's rule)	N/A	30 April 1977	21 June 1977	52 days	Dissolved	N/A
5	Devi Lal	Devi Lal	Bhattu Kalan	21 June 1977	28 June 1979	2 years, 7 days	5th (1977 elections)	Janata Party
6	Bhajan Lal	Bhajan Lal	Adampur	28 June 1979	23 January 1980	6 years, 342 days	5th (1977 elections)	Janata Party
6	Bhajan Lal	Bhajan Lal	Adampur	23 January 1980	23 May 1982	6 years, 342 days	5th (1977 elections)	Indian National Congress
6	Bhajan Lal	Bhajan Lal	Adampur	23 May 1982	5 June 1986	6 years, 342 days	6th (1982 elections)	Indian National Congress
(3)		Bansi Lal	Tosham	5 June 1986	20 June 1987	1 year, 15 days	6th (1982 elections)	Indian National Congress
(5)	Devi Lal	Devi Lal	Meham	20 June 1987	2 December 1989	2 years, 165 days	7th (1987 election)	Janata Dal
7	Om Prakash Chautala	Om Prakash Chautala	Uchana Kalan	2 December 1989	22 May 1990	171 days	7th (1987 election)	Janata Dal
(4)	Banarsi Das Gupta	Banarsi Das Gupta	Bhiwani	22 May 1990	12 July 1990	51 days	7th (1987 election)	Janata Dal
(7)	Om Prakash Chautala	Om Prakash Chautala	Uchana Kalan	12 July 1990	17 July 1990	5 days	7th (1987 election)	Janata Dal
8		Hukam Singh	Dadri	17 July 1990	22 March 1991	248 days	7th (1987 election)	Janata Dal
(7)	Om Prakash Chautala	Om Prakash Chautala	Uchana Kalan	22 March 1991	6 April 1991	15 days	7th (1987 election)	Samajwadi Janata Party (Rashtriya)
–	Emblem of India	Vacant (President's rule)	N/A	6 April 1991	23 June 1991	78 days	Dissolved	N/A
(6)	Bhajan Lal	Bhajan Lal	Adampur	23 June 1991	11 May 1996	4 years, 323 days	8th (1991 election)	Indian National Congress
(3)		Bansi Lal	Tosham	11 May 1996	24 July 1999	3 years, 74 days	9th (1996 elections)	Haryana Vikas Party
(7)	Om Prakash Chautala	Om Prakash Chautala	Narwana	24 July 1999	2 March 2000	5 years, 224 days	9th (1996 elections)	Indian National Lok Dal
(7)	Om Prakash Chautala	Om Prakash Chautala	Narwana	2 March 2000	5 March 2005	5 years, 224 days	10th (2000 elections)	Indian National Lok Dal
9		Bhupinder Singh Hooda	Kiloi	5 March 2005	25 October 2009	9 years, 235 days	11th (2005 elections)	Indian National Congress
9		Bhupinder Singh Hooda	Garhi Sampla-Kiloi	25 October 2009	26 October 2014	9 years, 235 days	12th (2009 elections)	Indian National Congress
10	Manohar Lal Khattar	Manohar Lal Khattar	Karnal	26 October 2014	27 October 2019	9 years, 138 days	13th (2014 elections)	Bharatiya Janata Party
10	Manohar Lal Khattar	Manohar Lal Khattar	Karnal	27 October 2019	12 March 2024	9 years, 138 days	14th (2019 elections)	Bharatiya Janata Party
11		Nayab Singh Saini	Karnal	12 March 2024	17 October 2024	2 years, 241 days	14th (2019 elections)	Bharatiya Janata Party
11		Nayab Singh Saini	Ladwa	17 October 2024	Incumbent	2 years, 241 days	15th (2024 elections)	Bharatiya Janata Party

== Statistics ==
Fraction of time of holding CMO by party (as of 8 November 2026)
1. Indian National Congress (53.2%)
2. Bharatiya Janata Party (19.8%)
3. Indian National Lok Dal (9.39%)
4. Janata Dal (6.28%)
5. Haryana Vikas Party (5.35%)
6. Janata Party (3.37%)
7. Vishal Haryana Party (1.10%)
8. Samajwadi Janata Party (Rashtriya) (0.07%)
9. President's Rule (1.43%)

#	Chief Minister	Party	Length of term	
#	Chief Minister	Party	Longest tenure	Total tenure
1	Bhajan Lal	INC/JP	6 years, 342 days	11 years, 300 days
2	Bansi Lal	INC/HVP	7 years, 194 days	11 years, 283 days
3	Bhupinder Singh Hooda	INC	9 years, 235 days	9 years, 235 days
4	Manohar Lal Khattar	BJP	9 years, 138 days	9 years, 138 days
5	Om Prakash Chautala	INLD/JD/SJP(R)	5 years, 224 days	6 years, 50 days
6	Devi Lal	JP/JD	2 years, 165 days	4 years, 172 days
7	Nayab Singh Saini	BJP	2 years, 241 days	2 years, 241 days
8	Banarsi Das Gupta	INC/JD	1 year, 150 days	1 year, 201 days
9	Hukam Singh	JD	248 days	248 days
10	Rao Birender Singh	VHP	241 days	241 days
11	Bhagwat Dayal Sharma	INC	143 days	143 days

== Oath as the state chief minister ==
The chief minister serves five years in the office. The following is the oath of the chief minister of state:

I, <Name of Chief Minister>, do swear in the name of God/solemnly affirm that I will bear true faith and allegiance to the Constitution of India as by law established, that I will uphold the sovereignty and integrity of India, that I will faithfully and conscientiously discharge my duties as a Minister for the State of () and that I will do right to all manner of people in accordance with the Constitution and the law without fear or favour, affection or ill-will.

Oath of Secrecy

"I, [Name], do swear in the name of God / solemnly affirm that I will not directly or indirectly communicate or reveal to any person or persons any matter which shall be brought under my consideration or shall become known to me as a Minister for the State of [Name of State] except as may be required for the due discharge of my duties as such Minister."Pad ki Shapath (Oath of Office) "Main, [CM ka Naam], Ishwar ki shapath leta hoon / satyanishtha se pratigyan karta hoon ki main vidhi dwara sthapit Bharat ke Samvidhan ke prati sachi shraddha aur nishtha rakhunga. Main Bharat ki prabhuta aur akhandta akshunn rakhunga. Main [State ka Naam] ke Rajya ke Mukhya Mantri ke roop mein apne kartavyon ka shraddhapoorvak aur shuddh antahkaran se nirvahan karunga, tatha main bhay ya pakshpat, anurag ya dwesh ke bina, sabhi prakar ke logon ke prati Samvidhan aur vidhi ke anusar nyay karunga." B. Gopniyata ki Shapath (Oath of Secrecy) "Main, [CM ka Naam], Ishwar ki shapath leta hoon / satyanishtha se pratigyan karta hoon ki jo vishay [State ka Naam] ke Rajya ke Mukhya Mantri ke roop mein mere vichar ke liye laya jayega athva mujhe gyaat hoga, use kisi vyakti ya vyaktityon ko, tab ke sivay jab ki aise Mukhya Mantri ke roop mein apne kartavyon ke uchit nirvahan ke liye aisa karna apekshit ho, main pratyaksh (directly) ya apratyaksh (indirectly) roop mein sansuchit ya prakat nahi karunga."
