= Chautala, Sirsa =

Village in Haryana, India

Chautala Chutala
- Village
- Location in Haryana, India Chautala (India)
- Coordinates: 29°46′50.7″N 74°31′21.2″E
- Country: India
- State: Haryana
- District: Sirsa

Government
  - Type: Panchayati raj (India)
  - Body: Gram panchayat

Area
  - Total: 7.5 km^{2} (2.9 sq mi)

Population (2011)
  - Total: 16,178
  - Density: 2,200/km^{2} (5,600/sq mi)

Languages
  - Official: Hindi, Regional Haryanvi
- Time zone: UTC+5:30 (IST)
- Postal code: 125101
- Telephone code: 1668
- ISO 3166 code: HR-IN
- Website: haryana.gov.in

Chautala is a village near Sirsa in Dabwali Mandal, Sirsa district in Haryana, India. Chaudhary Devi Lal, a former deputy prime minister of India, belonged to this village, as their ancestors settled here 1919.

Omparkash Chautala, former five term chief minister of Haryana, was the first person in the family of Devi Lal, who started using this village's name as their surname, although they belong to the Sihag clan of Hindu Jats.

Chautala has a hospital, an industrial training institute, government senior secondary schools for boys and girls, a private secondary school named Sheetal High School, two stadiums and branches of two banks.

Queen's Baton Relay for the 2010 Commonwealth Games passed through this village. The 51st Senior National Volleyball Championship was held in Chaudhary Sahib Ram Stadium, Chautala in 2002.
