= 2022 Haryana local elections =

Indian local body elections

2022 Haryana municipal elections
- 2022

All 46 seats
	Majority party	Minority party	Third party
Party	BJP	AAP	INLD
Alliance	NDA
Leader since	2020	2012	2020
Seats won	25	1	1
Elected majority councils
BJP

Municipal elections in Haryana for the post of president were held in 2022 for 46 local bodies. The 46 local bodies included 18 municipal councils and 26 municipal committees. The Bharatiya Janata Party won elections of 25 local bodies, while Independents won 19. INLD and AAP won 1 local body each while the congress was reduced to 0.

== Parties and alliances ==
=== National Democratic Alliance ===
No.	Party	Flag	Symbol	Leader	Photo	Seats Contested
1.	Bharatiya Janata Party					45
2.	Jannayak Janta Party					-

=== Aam Aadmi Party ===
No.	Party	Flag	Symbol	Leader	Photo	Seats Contested
1.	Aam Aadmi Party			Arvind Kejriwal		45

=== United Progressive Alliance ===
No.	Party	Flag	Symbol	Leader	Photo	Seats Contested
1.	Indian National Congress					45

=== Others ===
No.	Party	Flag	Symbol	Leader	Photo	Seats Contested
1.	Indian National Lok Dal					45

== Election results ==
The results of the election were counted and declared on 22 June 2022.

Haryana municipal elections
Party	Seats won	Seats +/−	Vote %
Bharatiya Janata Party	25	▲5	26.3
Independent politician	19		52.2
Aam Aadmi Party	1		10.3
Indian National Lok Dal	1		4.3
Indian National Congress	0		
Total	46	±0	100

Haryana municipal council elections
Party	Seats won	Seats +/−	Vote %
Bharatiya Janata Party	11		
Independent politician	6		
Aam Aadmi Party	0		
Indian National Lok Dal	1		
Indian National Congress	0		
Total	18	±0	100

Haryana municipal committees elections
Party	Seats won	Seats +/−	Vote %
Bharatiya Janata Party	14		
Independent politician	13		
Aam Aadmi Party	1		
Indian National Lok Dal	0		
Indian National Congress	0		
Total	28	±0	100
