= Balraj Kundu =

Indian politician

Member of Haryana Legislative Assembly
- In office 2019–2024
- Preceded by: Anand Singh Dangi
- Succeeded by: Balram Dangi
- Constituency: Meham

Personal details
- Occupation: MLA
- Profession: Business, agriculture

Balraj Kundu is an Indian politician. He was elected to the Haryana Legislative Assembly as the representative from Meham in the 2019 Haryana Legislative Assembly election as an independent candidate. Now he has registered his party Haryana Jansevak Party at state level. He is a revolutionary social worker who works in faith of public. He runs 18 buses across Meham constituency villages to Rohtak for the safety of girls and financial support to their family. After strong defeat in 2024 Legislative Assembly, he stopped bus service. Now the common man raised a slogan "opportunist full of politics" for him.
