= Bharat Singh Beniwal =

Indian politician

Member of the Haryana Legislative Assembly
- Incumbent
- Assumed office 2024
- Preceded by: Abhay Singh Chautala
- Constituency: Ellenabad

Personal details
- Party: Indian National Congress
- Occupation: Politician

Bharat Singh Beniwal is an Indian politician from Haryana. He is a Member of the Haryana Legislative Assembly since 2024, representing Ellenabad. He is a member of the Indian National Congress (INC).

== See also ==
- 2024 Haryana Legislative Assembly election
- Haryana Legislative Assembly
