= Balram Dangi =

Indian politician

Member of Haryana Legislative Assembly
- Incumbent
- Assumed office 8 October 2024
- Preceded by: Balraj Kundu
- Constituency: Maham

Personal details
- Party: Indian National Congress
- Profession: Politician

Balram Dangi is an Indian politician from Haryana. He is a Member of the Haryana Legislative Assembly from 2024, representing Maham Assembly constituency as a Member of the Indian National Congress party.

== See also ==
- 2024 Haryana Legislative Assembly election
- Haryana Legislative Assembly
