= Naresh Kaushik =

Indian politician

Naresh Kaushik (born 1967) is an Indian politician from Haryana. He was a member of the 13th Vidhan Sabha of the Haryana Legislative Assembly representing the Bahadurgarh Vidhan Sabha Constituency. He is a member of the Bharatiya Janata Party.

== Early life and education ==
Kaushik is from Bahadurgarh, Jhajjar district, Haryana. He is the son of Ram Karan. He completed his B.A. in 2014 at Manonmaniam Sundaranar University, Tirunelveli, Tamil Nadu.

== Career ==
Kaushik won from Bahadurgarh Assembly constituency representing the Bharatiya Janata Party in the 2014 Haryana Legislative Assembly election.
