= Rajesh Joon =

Indian politician

Member of Haryana Legislative Assembly
- Incumbent
- Assumed office 8 October 2024
- Preceded by: Rajinder Singh Joon
- Constituency: Bahadurgarh

Personal details
- Party: BJP
- Profession: Politician

Rajesh Joon is an Indian politician from Haryana. He is a Member of the Haryana Legislative Assembly from 2024, representing Bahadurgarh Assembly constituency as an Independent candidate.

== See also ==
- 2024 Haryana Legislative Assembly election
- Haryana Legislative Assembly
