= Maham Assembly constituency =

Legislative Assembly constituency in Haryana State, India

Coordinates: 28.97°N 76.3°E

Meham
- Constituency No. 60 for the Haryana Legislative Assembly

Constituency details
- Country: India
- Region: North India
- State: Haryana
- District: Rohtak
- Lok Sabha constituency: Rohtak
- Established: 1962
- Total electors: 2,17,262
- Reservation: None

Member of Legislative Assembly
- 15th Haryana Legislative Assembly
- Incumbent Balram Dangi
- Party: Indian National Congress
- Elected year: 2024

Meham Assembly constituency is one of the 90 Legislative Assembly constituencies of Haryana state in India.

It is part of Rohtak district.

== Members of the Legislative Assembly ==
Year	Member	Party
1962	Ram Dhari	Haryana Lok Samiti
1967	Maha Singh Nehra	Independent
1968	Raj Singh Dalal	Indian National Congress
1972	Umed Singh	Independent
1977	Har Sarup Boora	Janata Party
1982	Devi Lal	Lokdal
1987	Devi Lal	Lokdal
1991	Anand Singh Dangi	Indian National Congress
1996	Balbir Singh Malik	Samata Party
2000	Balbir Singh Malik	Indian National Lok Dal
2005	Anand Singh Dangi	Indian National Congress
2009	Anand Singh Dangi	Indian National Congress
2014	Anand Singh Dangi	Indian National Congress
2019	Balraj Kundu	Independent
2024	Balram Dangi	Indian National Congress

^By-election

== Election results ==
=== Assembly Election 2024 ===
2024 Haryana Legislative Assembly election: Meham
Party	Candidate	Votes	%	±%
INC	Balram Dangi	56,865	38.05	▲11.29
Haryana Jansevak Party	Balraj Kundu	38,805	25.96	▼9.27
Independent	Radha Ahlawat	29,211	19.54	New
BJP	Deepak Niwas Hooda	8,929	5.97	▼19.89
AAP	Vikash Nehra	8,610	5.76	New
Margin of victory		18,060	12.08%	▲3.45
Turnout		2,00,698	74.79%	▼1.05
Registered electors		1,99,898		▲8.58
INC gain from Independent		Swing	▲2.65	

=== Assembly Election 2019 ===
2019 Haryana Legislative Assembly election: Meham
Party	Candidate	Votes	%	±%
Independent	Balraj Kundu	49,418	35.39	New
INC	Anand Singh Dangi	37,371	26.76	▼10.80
BJP	Shamsher Kharkara	36,106	25.86	▼4.55
BSP	Anil Kumar Bintu	8,895	6.37	▲3.87
JJP	Hargian Mokhra	5,122	3.67	New
LSP	Thakur Joginder Pal Singh Samar	1,063	0.76	New
Margin of victory		12,047	8.63	▲1.48
Turnout		1,39,627	75.84	▼5.06
Registered electors		1,84,110		▲10.29
Independent gain from INC		Swing	▼2.17	

=== Assembly Election 2014 ===
2014 Haryana Legislative Assembly election: Meham
Party	Candidate	Votes	%	±%
INC	Anand Singh Dangi	50,728	37.56	▲0.01
BJP	Shamsher Kharkara	41,071	30.41	▲29.84
INLD	Satish Das	32,020	23.71	▲10.63
HJCPV	Sourabh Farmana	5,889	4.36	New
BSP	Rajesh	3,371	2.50	▼0.91
Margin of victory		9,657	7.15	▲1.20
Turnout		1,35,043	80.90	▲3.13
Registered electors		1,66,933		▲10.91
INC hold		Swing	▲0.01	

=== Assembly Election 2009 ===
2009 Haryana Legislative Assembly election: Meham
Party	Candidate	Votes	%	±%
INC	Anand Singh Dangi	43,964	37.56%	▼16.22
Independent	Shamsher Kharkara	36,998	31.61%	New
INLD	Balbir Singh	15,314	13.08%	▼16.40
HJC(BL)	Anil	8,450	7.22%	New
Independent	Sunil	6,165	5.27%	New
BSP	Raj Rani Sharma	3,989	3.41%	▼4.58
BJP	Ajit	674	0.58%	▼5.33
Margin of victory		6,966	5.95%	▼18.35
Turnout		1,17,056	77.77%	▲0.07
Registered electors		1,50,515		▲23.13
INC hold		Swing	▼16.22	

=== Assembly Election 2005 ===
2005 Haryana Legislative Assembly election: Meham
Party	Candidate	Votes	%	±%
INC	Anand Singh Dangi	51,078	53.78%	▲13.53
INLD	Rajbir	28,001	29.48%	▼15.94
BSP	Kapoor Singh	7,582	7.98%	▲2.44
BJP	Meena	5,606	5.90%	New
RLD	Rohtas	1,355	1.43%	New
Independent	Som Nath	581	0.61%	New
Margin of victory		23,077	24.30%	▲19.13
Turnout		94,979	77.70%	▲0.06
Registered electors		1,22,239		▲12.93
INC gain from INLD		Swing	▲8.36	

=== Assembly Election 2000 ===
2000 Haryana Legislative Assembly election: Meham
Party	Candidate	Votes	%	±%
INLD	Balbir Singh	38,167	45.42%	New
INC	Anand Singh Dangi	33,821	40.25%	▲8.35
Independent	Sunil	4,887	5.82%	New
BSP	Dalip S/O Amar Singh	4,657	5.54%	▲2.55
Independent	Suraj Mal	846	1.01%	New
HVP	Tarif Singh	622	0.74%	▼26.40
SHSP	Kuldeep	443	0.53%	New
Margin of victory		4,346	5.17%	▲4.83
Turnout		84,034	77.68%	▲8.61
Registered electors		1,08,239		▼0.51
INLD gain from SAP		Swing	▲13.18	

=== Assembly Election 1996 ===
1996 Haryana Legislative Assembly election: Meham
Party	Candidate	Votes	%	±%
SAP	Balbir Singh	24,210	32.24%	New
INC	Anand Singh Dangi	23,953	31.89%	▼31.85
HVP	Sarup Singh	20,382	27.14%	▲20.06
BSP	Deepak	2,244	2.99%	New
Independent	Balraj	2,163	2.88%	New
Margin of victory		257	0.34%	▼38.18
Turnout		75,102	71.51%	▲4.47
Registered electors		1,08,794		▲2.68
SAP gain from INC		Swing	▼31.51	

=== Assembly Election 1991 ===
1991 Haryana Legislative Assembly election: Meham
Party	Candidate	Votes	%	±%
INC	Anand Singh Dangi	43,608	63.75%	▲34.86
JP	Sube Singh	17,259	25.23%	New
HVP	Ram Chander	4,842	7.08%	New
Independent	Jaipal Singh	1,110	1.62%	New
Independent	Balbir Singh	743	1.09%	New
Margin of victory		26,349	38.52%	▲0.22
Turnout		68,407	65.98%	▼5.68
Registered electors		1,05,959		▲9.71
INC gain from LKD		Swing	▼3.44	

=== Assembly Election 1987 ===
1987 Haryana Legislative Assembly election: Meham
Party	Candidate	Votes	%	±%
LKD	Devi Lal	45,576	67.18%	New
INC	Sarup Singh	19,595	28.89%	New
VHP	Tarif Singh	945	1.39%	New
Independent	Raghubir Singh	717	1.06%	New
Margin of victory		25,981	38.30%	
Turnout		67,837	71.83%	
Registered electors		96,581		
LKD hold		Swing		

=== Assembly By-election 1985 ===
1985 Haryana Legislative Assembly by-election: Meham
Party	Candidate	Votes	%	±%
LKD	Devi Lal	38,598		
INC	R. Singh	27,229		
Independent	J. Singh	562		New
Independent	J. Pal	190		New
Margin of victory		11,369		
LKD hold		Swing		

=== Assembly Election 1982 ===
1982 Haryana Legislative Assembly election: Meham
Party	Candidate	Votes	%	±%
LKD	Devi Lal	36,324	62.87%	New
INC	Har Sarup Boora	19,649	34.01%	▲27.28
Independent	Paras Ram	393	0.68%	New
Margin of victory		16,675	28.86%	▼3.13
Turnout		57,779	69.81%	▲4.90
Registered electors		83,936		▲22.76
LKD gain from JP		Swing		

=== Assembly Election 1977 ===
1977 Haryana Legislative Assembly election: Meham
Party	Candidate	Votes	%	±%
JP	Har Sarup Boora	21,509	49.20%	New
Independent	Wazir Singh	7,524	17.21%	New
Independent	Chander Singh	5,572	12.75%	New
Independent	Sudarshan Kumar	4,952	11.33%	New
INC	Mehar Singh	2,941	6.73%	▼36.81
Independent	Jaipal Singh	890	2.04%	New
Independent	Nand Kishore	205	0.47%	New
Margin of victory		13,985	31.99%	▲30.59
Turnout		43,716	64.50%	▼6.65
Registered electors		68,374		▲10.35
JP gain from Independent		Swing	▲4.26	

=== Assembly Election 1972 ===
1972 Haryana Legislative Assembly election: Meham
Party	Candidate	Votes	%	±%
Independent	Umed	19,654	44.94%	New
INC	Raj Singh	19,042	43.54%	▼5.41
Independent	Chatru	4,546	10.39%	New
Independent	Tale Ram	493	1.13%	New
Margin of victory		612	1.40%	▲0.73
Turnout		43,735	72.07%	▲6.51
Registered electors		61,960		▲17.94
Independent gain from INC		Swing	▼4.01	

=== Assembly Election 1968 ===
1968 Haryana Legislative Assembly election: Meham
Party	Candidate	Votes	%	±%
INC	Raj Singh	16,479	48.95%	▲14.32
Independent	Maha Singh	16,253	48.28%	New
Independent	Hawa Singh	530	1.57%	New
ABJS	Ram Lubhaya	402	1.19%	▼5.97
Margin of victory		226	0.67%	▼13.62
Turnout		33,664	65.38%	▼10.34
Registered electors		52,534		▲1.34
INC gain from Independent		Swing	▲0.03	

=== Assembly Election 1967 ===
1967 Haryana Legislative Assembly election: Meham
Party	Candidate	Votes	%	±%
Independent	M. Singh	18,875	48.92%	New
INC	B. Prasad	13,361	34.63%	New
ABJS	I. Singh	2,764	7.16%	New
Independent	R. Sharma	2,315	6.00%	New
SSP	M. Krishan	918	2.38%	New
RPI	Hardeva	347	0.90%	New
Margin of victory		5,514	14.29%	
Turnout		38,580	77.77%	
Registered electors		51,840		
Independent win (new seat)				

== See also ==
- List of constituencies of the Haryana Legislative Assembly
- Rohtak district
