= Bhattu Kalan Assembly constituency =

Constituency of the Haryana legislative assembly in India

Coordinates: 29°23′14″N 75°20′32″E

- Former constituency for the Haryana Legislative Assembly

Constituency details
- Country: India
- Region: North India
- State: Haryana
- Established: 1977
- Abolished: 2005
- Total electors: 1,24,766

Bhattu Kalan Assembly constituency was an assembly constituency in the India state of Haryana.

== Members of the Legislative Assembly ==
Election	Member	Party
1977	Devi Lal	Janata Party
1980 Bye election	Ran Singh Beniwal	Indian National Congress
1982	Sampat Singh	Independent politician
1987	Sampat Singh	Lokdal
1991	Sampat Singh	Janata Party
1996	Mani Ram Godara	Haryana Vikas Party
2000	Sampat Singh	Indian National Lok Dal
2005	Kulvir Singh Beniwal	Indian National Congress

== Election results ==
=== Assembly Election 2005 ===
2005 Haryana Legislative Assembly election: Bhattu Kalan
Party	Candidate	Votes	%	±%
INC	Kulvir Singh	50,102	47.98%	▲10.37
INLD	Sampat Singh	40,522	38.80%	▼16.46
Independent	Rajender Singh Beniwal	6,147	5.89%	New
BJP	Daya Nand	3,394	3.25%	New
Independent	Surender Kumar	1,069	1.02%	New
BSP	Ram Singh	1,007	0.96%	▼1.43
Independent	Ranjit Singh	519	0.50%	New
Margin of victory		9,580	9.17%	▼8.49
Turnout		1,04,429	83.70%	▲2.33
Registered electors		1,24,766		▲14.92
INC gain from INLD		Swing	▼7.29	

=== Assembly Election 2000 ===
2000 Haryana Legislative Assembly election: Bhattu Kalan
Party	Candidate	Votes	%	±%
INLD	Sampat Singh	48,823	55.27%	New
INC	Jagdish Nehra	33,218	37.60%	▲27.52
BSP	Inder Singh	2,119	2.40%	▲1.58
HVP	Kamlesh Kumari	963	1.09%	▼47.16
Independent	Amar Chand Jakhar	928	1.05%	New
Independent	Bani Singh Beniwal	718	0.81%	New
Independent	Mani Ram	477	0.54%	New
Independent	Harpal	466	0.53%	New
Margin of victory		15,605	17.66%	▲8.26
Turnout		88,340	81.38%	▲0.07
Registered electors		1,08,567		▲2.79
INLD gain from HVP		Swing	▲7.02	

=== Assembly Election 1996 ===
1996 Haryana Legislative Assembly election: Bhattu Kalan
Party	Candidate	Votes	%	±%
HVP	Mani Ram Godara	41,433	48.25%	▲15.67
SAP	Sampat Singh	33,355	38.84%	New
INC	Ran Singh Beniwal	8,659	10.08%	▼13.98
BSP	Surjit Singh	701	0.82%	▼0.72
Margin of victory		8,078	9.41%	▲5.51
Turnout		85,868	84.20%	▲9.68
Registered electors		1,05,621		▲10.39
HVP gain from JP		Swing	▲11.76	

=== Assembly Election 1991 ===
1991 Haryana Legislative Assembly election: Bhattu Kalan
Party	Candidate	Votes	%	±%
JP	Sampat Singh	25,004	36.49%	New
HVP	Mani Ram Godara	22,330	32.59%	New
INC	Ran Singh Beniwal	16,488	24.06%	▼11.11
BSP	Sheo Karana	1,055	1.54%	New
BJP	Ram Chander	823	1.20%	New
Independent	Rameshwar	611	0.89%	New
Independent	Lila Dhar	516	0.75%	New
Margin of victory		2,674	3.90%	▼21.50
Turnout		68,528	74.31%	▼6.44
Registered electors		95,681		▲7.07
JP gain from LKD		Swing	▼24.08	

=== Assembly Election 1987 ===
1987 Haryana Legislative Assembly election: Bhattu Kalan
Party	Candidate	Votes	%	±%
LKD	Sampat Singh	42,251	60.57%	▲59.74
INC	Mani Ram Godara	24,534	35.17%	▼5.46
Independent	Makhan Lal Punia	1,562	2.24%	New
Independent	Rameshar Dass	1,101	1.58%	New
Margin of victory		17,717	25.40%	▲12.18
Turnout		69,759	79.44%	▲7.11
Registered electors		89,363		▲18.63
LKD gain from Independent		Swing	▲6.72	

=== Assembly Election 1982 ===
1982 Haryana Legislative Assembly election: Bhattu Kalan
Party	Candidate	Votes	%	±%
Independent	Sampat Singh	28,780	53.85%	New
INC	Ran Singh Beniwal	21,717	40.63%	New
Independent	Shiv Bux Jangra	1,072	2.01%	New
Independent	Bhagwan Singh	797	1.49%	New
LKD	Ram Sarup	442	0.83%	New
Independent	Nihal Singh	432	0.81%	New
Margin of victory		7,063	13.21%	
Turnout		53,448	72.17%	
Registered electors		75,330		
Independent win (new seat)				

=== Assembly By-election 1980 ===
1980 Haryana Legislative Assembly Bye Election: Bhattu Kalan
Party	Candidate	Votes	%	±%
INC	Ran Singh Beniwal	28,107		New
JNP(SC)	S. Singh	18,344		New
JP	N. Singh	2,528		New
Independent	T. C. Dhillon	602		New
Independent	J. C. Manjhu	369		New
Independent	R. Richhpal	262		New
Margin of victory		9,763		
win (new seat)				

=== Assembly Election 1977 ===
1977 Haryana Legislative Assembly election: Bhattu Kalan
Party	Candidate	Votes	%	±%
JP	Devi Lal	27,491	65.52%	New
CPI(M)	Prithvi Singh	13,731	32.72%	New
Independent	Jagdish Chander	563	1.34%	New
Margin of victory		13,760	32.79%	
Turnout		41,959	68.90%	
Registered electors		61,623		
JP win (new seat)				
