= Rori Assembly constituency =

Constituency of the Haryana legislative assembly in India

Coordinates: 29.74°N 75.21°E

- Former constituency for the Haryana Legislative Assembly

Constituency details
- Country: India
- Region: North India
- State: Haryana
- Established: 1967
- Abolished: 2005
- Total electors: 1,28,819

Rori Assembly constituency was an assembly constituency in the India state of Haryana.

== Members of the Legislative Assembly ==
Election	Member	Party
1967	P. S. Dass	Indian National Congress
1968	Harkishan Lal	Indian National Congress
1972	Harkishan Lal	Indian National Congress
1977	Sukhdev Singh	Janata Party
1982	Jagdish Nehra	Indian National Congress
1987	Ranjit Singh Chautala	Lokdal
1991	Jagdish Nehra	Indian National Congress
1996	Om Prakash Chautala	Samata Party
2000	Om Prakash Chautala	Indian National Lok Dal
2005	Om Prakash Chautala	Indian National Lok Dal

== Election results ==
=== Assembly Election 2005 ===
2005 Haryana Legislative Assembly election: Rori
Party	Candidate	Votes	%	±%
INLD	Om Prakash Chautala	67,996	60.00%	▼0.09
INC	Jagdish Nehra	41,418	36.55%	▲0.12
BJP	Renu	1,229	1.08%	New
Independent	Subhash	785	0.69%	New
BSP	Bhoora Singh	753	0.66%	New
SP	Balkaran Singh	706	0.62%	New
Margin of victory		26,578	23.45%	▼0.22
Turnout		1,13,321	87.97%	▲4.95
Registered electors		1,28,819		▲11.98
INLD hold		Swing	▼0.09	

=== Assembly Election 2000 ===
2000 Haryana Legislative Assembly election: Rori
Party	Candidate	Votes	%	±%
INLD	Om Prakash Chautala	57,397	60.10%	New
INC	Ranjit Singh Chautala	34,791	36.43%	▲0.21
CPI	Vindraban	981	1.03%	New
Independent	Sheoram Singh	978	1.02%	New
Independent	Lakshmi Narain	789	0.83%	New
Margin of victory		22,606	23.67%	▲14.60
Turnout		95,509	83.04%	▼1.01
Registered electors		1,15,042		▲4.56
INLD gain from SAP		Swing	▲14.81	

=== Assembly Election 1996 ===
1996 Haryana Legislative Assembly election: Rori
Party	Candidate	Votes	%	±%
SAP	Om Prakash Chautala	41,867	45.28%	New
INC	Jagdish Nehra	33,485	36.22%	▼9.23
HVP	Sukhdev Singh	12,087	13.07%	▲3.74
Independent	Aad Ram	514	0.56%	New
Independent	Bhura Singh	497	0.54%	New
Independent	Buta Singh	488	0.53%	New
AIIC(T)	Gurmail Singh	476	0.51%	New
Margin of victory		8,382	9.07%	▼3.04
Turnout		92,460	86.34%	▲10.98
Registered electors		1,10,028		▲4.65
SAP gain from INC		Swing	▼0.16	

=== Assembly Election 1991 ===
1991 Haryana Legislative Assembly election: Rori
Party	Candidate	Votes	%	±%
INC	Jagdish Mehra	34,902	45.44%	▲11.78
JP	Hari Singh	25,602	33.34%	▲32.20
HVP	Hardam Singh	7,166	9.33%	New
Independent	Balwant Singh	4,187	5.45%	New
BSP	Kalu Ram	1,282	1.67%	New
BJP	Luxmi Narain	1,083	1.41%	New
Independent	Ranjit Singh	724	0.94%	New
Independent	Deep Chand	694	0.90%	New
Margin of victory		9,300	12.11%	▼11.90
Turnout		76,802	74.81%	▼7.26
Registered electors		1,05,137		▲11.72
INC gain from LKD		Swing	▼12.22	

=== Assembly Election 1987 ===
1987 Haryana Legislative Assembly election: Rori
Party	Candidate	Votes	%	±%
LKD	Ranjit Singh Chautala	43,588	57.67%	▲21.25
INC	Jagdish Nehra	25,444	33.66%	▼23.16
Independent	Natha Singh	3,797	5.02%	New
JP	Sukhdev Singh	860	1.14%	▲0.05
Independent	Om Prakash Chautala	671	0.89%	New
Margin of victory		18,144	24.01%	▲3.60
Turnout		75,583	81.25%	▲6.83
Registered electors		94,110		▲19.37
LKD gain from INC		Swing	▲0.84	

=== Assembly Election 1982 ===
1982 Haryana Legislative Assembly election: Rori
Party	Candidate	Votes	%	±%
INC	Jagdish Mehra	32,921	56.83%	▲32.17
LKD	Partap Singh	21,101	36.42%	New
Independent	Krishan Kumar	1,089	1.88%	New
JP	Mahipat	630	1.09%	▼28.98
Independent	Nazer Singh	587	1.01%	New
Independent	Hakam Singh	515	0.89%	New
Independent	Sant Singh	434	0.75%	New
Independent	Gurdev Singh	387	0.67%	New
Margin of victory		11,820	20.40%	▲14.99
Turnout		57,934	74.93%	▲7.25
Registered electors		78,838		▲17.45
INC gain from JP		Swing	▲26.76	

=== Assembly Election 1977 ===
1977 Haryana Legislative Assembly election: Rori
Party	Candidate	Votes	%	±%
JP	Sukhdev Singh	13,368	30.07%	New
INC	Jagdish Nehra	10,962	24.66%	▼27.16
Independent	Dara Singh	9,196	20.69%	New
Independent	Partap Singh	8,160	18.35%	New
Independent	Ram Singh Sidhu	1,193	2.68%	New
Independent	Hakim Jarnail Singh Sidhu	1,109	2.49%	New
Independent	Gaja Singh	469	1.05%	New
Margin of victory		2,406	5.41%	▼23.45
Turnout		44,457	66.91%	▼5.54
Registered electors		67,123		▼6.08
JP gain from INC		Swing	▼21.75	

=== Assembly Election 1972 ===
1972 Haryana Legislative Assembly election: Rori
Party	Candidate	Votes	%	±%
INC	Harkishan Lal	26,581	51.82%	▲13.06
Independent	Sahib Singh	11,774	22.95%	New
Independent	Dara Singh	11,255	21.94%	New
Independent	Amir Chand	1,201	2.34%	New
INC	Hardev Singh	484	0.94%	▼37.82
Margin of victory		14,807	28.87%	▲27.36
Turnout		51,295	73.49%	▲10.15
Registered electors		71,470		▲9.00
INC hold		Swing	▲13.06	

=== Assembly Election 1968 ===
1968 Haryana Legislative Assembly election: Rori
Party	Candidate	Votes	%	±%
INC	Harkishan Lal	15,662	38.76%	▼4.75
Akali Dal (SFS)	Dara Singh	15,055	37.26%	New
Independent	Lachhman Das	7,336	18.15%	New
PSP	Puran Ram	1,434	3.55%	New
Independent	Bhim Raj	508	1.26%	New
Independent	Chamba Ram	414	1.02%	New
Margin of victory		607	1.50%	▼5.99
Turnout		40,409	63.30%	▼5.90
Registered electors		65,571		▲4.52
INC hold		Swing	▼4.75	

=== Assembly Election 1967 ===
1967 Haryana Legislative Assembly election: Rori
Party	Candidate	Votes	%	±%
INC	P. S. Dass	18,432	43.51%	New
Independent	D. Singh	15,260	36.02%	New
Independent	K. Ram	8,669	20.46%	New
Margin of victory		3,172	7.49%	
Turnout		42,361	70.17%	
Registered electors		62,735		
INC win (new seat)				
