= Nafe Singh Rathee =

Indian politician

State President Indian National Lok Dal Haryana
- In office 3 January 2020 – 25 February 2024

Member of Haryana Legislative Assembly
- In office 1996–2005
- Preceded by: Suraj Mal
- Succeeded by: Rajinder Singh
- Constituency: Bahadurgarh

Personal details
- Born: Haryana, India
- Died: 25 February 2024 Jhajjar, Haryana
- Party: Indian National Lok Dal
- Occupation: Politician

Nafe Singh Rathee (1954 - died 25 February 2024) was an Indian Politician from Haryana. He was State President of Indian National Lok Dal of Haryana. He was member of 9th and 10th Haryana Legislative Assembly from the Bahadurgarh constituency.

He was also two term Chairman of Bahadurgarh Municipal Council. He was President of All India Indian Style wrestling Association.

== Death ==
He died on 25 February 2024 when unknown men opened fire on him in Bahadurgarh, Jhajjar and killed him when he was travelling in his SUV.
