= Majra Nand Karan =

Majra Nand Karan Nand Karan Majra
- village
- Location in Haryana, India Majra Nand Karan (India)
- Coordinates: 29.659584°N 76.476753°E
- Country: India
- State: Haryana
- District: Kaithal district

Government
  - Type: Local government
  - Body: Panchayat

Area
  - Total: 7.45 km^{2} (2.88 sq mi)
- Elevation: 231 m (758 ft)

Population (2011)
  - Total: 3,163
  - Density: 425/km^{2} (1,100/sq mi)

Languages
  - Official: Hindi
- Time zone: UTC+5:30 (IST)
- PIN: 136027
- Telephone code: 01746
- Vehicle registration: HR-08
- Literacy: 67.81% (total); 79.65% (male); 53.40% (female)
- Sex ratio: 830 ♂/♀

Majra Nand Karan village is located in Kaithal Tehsil of Kaithal district in Haryana, India. It is situated 19 kilometres (12 mi) away from Kaithal, which is both district & sub-district headquarter of Majra Nand Karan village. As per 2009 stats, Majra Nand Karan village is also a gram panchayat. On the main chowk of the Village there is a beautiful Statue of SHAHEED-A-AZAM BHAGAT SINGH JI.

== Demographics ==
Most of the population of the village is Hindu and widely spoken language is Haryanvi.

== Schools ==
- Govt. high school, Govt.primary school

== Transportation ==
The nearby Railway stations to Majra Nand Karan village are New Kaithal Halt Railway station (NKLE) and Kaithal Railway station (KLE).

From Kaithal bus stand, bus services are also available to Delhi, Hisar, Chandigarh, Jammu and many other places. For Inter-state travel HR buses are also available from nearby town Rajound.

== Yuva Samiti ==
Since 2016 Shaheed Bhagat Singh Yuva Sangthan is doing work In the Village.Yuva sangthan is the organization of sanskritik Ragni program, that takes plas every year on 27,28 September Since 2016. All the countries most famous singers like Pale Ram, Ranbir badwasniya, Ramesh kalawadiya, vikash pasoriya, amit malik, vikash satrod, ishwar chhatter come to perform at the festival.
