= Ellenabad Assembly constituency =

Constituency of the Haryana legislative assembly in India

Coordinates: 29.45°N 74.67°E

Ellenabad
- Constituency No. 46 for the Haryana Legislative Assembly

Constituency details
- Country: India
- Region: North India
- State: Haryana
- Lok Sabha constituency: Sirsa
- Established: 1967
- Total electors: 1,95,308
- Reservation: None

Member of Legislative Assembly
- 15th Haryana Legislative Assembly
- Incumbent Bharat Singh Beniwal
- Party: Indian National Congress
- Elected year: 2024
- Preceded by: Abhay Singh Chautala

Ellenabad is one of the 90 constituencies in the Haryana Legislative Assembly in India. Ellenabad is a part of Sirsa Lok Sabha constituency. Bharat Singh Beniwal is the incumbent member of Haryana Legislative Assembly from Ellenabad since 2024.

== Members of Legislative Assembly ==
Year	Member	Party
1967	Partap Singh Chautala	Indian National Congress
1968	Lal Chand Khod	Vishal Haryana Party
1970(Bye-election)	Om Prakash Chautala	Praja Socialist Party
1972	Chaudhary Brij Lal	Indian National Congress
1977	Bhagi Ram	Janata Party
1982	Bhagi Ram	Lok Dal
1987	Bhagi Ram	Lok Dal
1991	Mani Ram	Indian National Congress
1996	Bhagi Ram	Samata Party
2000	Bhagi Ram	Indian National Lok Dal
2005	Sushil Kumar Indora	Indian National Lok Dal
2009	Om Prakash Chautala	Indian National Lok Dal
2010^	Abhay Singh Chautala	Indian National Lok Dal
2014	Abhay Singh Chautala	Indian National Lok Dal
2019	Abhay Singh Chautala	Indian National Lok Dal
2021^	Abhay Singh Chautala	Indian National Lok Dal
2024	Bharat Singh Beniwal	Indian National Congress

^By-Poll

== Election results ==
=== Assembly Election 2024 ===
2024 Haryana Legislative Assembly election: Ellenabad
Party	Candidate	Votes	%	±%
INC	Bharat Singh Beniwal	77,865	49.14	▲35.30
INLD	Abhay Singh Chautala	62,865	39.67	▼4.02
BJP	Amir Chand Talwara	13,320	8.41	▼30.82
JJP	Anjani Ladha	1,593	1.01	New
AAP	Manish Arora	885	0.56	New
NOTA	None of the Above	545	0.34	▲0.03
Margin of victory		15,000	9.47	▲5.00
Turnout		1,58,454	81.03	▲0.01
Registered electors		1,95,308		▲4.90
INC gain from INLD		Swing	▲5.45	

=== Assembly By-election 2021 ===
2021 Haryana Legislative Assembly by-election: Ellenabad
Party	Candidate	Votes	%	±%
INLD	Abhay Singh Chautala	65,992	43.69	▲5.83
BJP	Gobind Kanda	59,253	39.23	▲9.28
INC	Pawan Beniwal	20,904	13.84	▼9.64
NOTA	Nota	480	0.32	▼0.17
Margin of victory		6,739	4.46	▼3.45
Turnout		1,51,044	81.28	▼2.22
Registered electors		1,86,416		▲2.98
INLD hold		Swing	▲5.83	

=== Assembly Election 2019 ===
2019 Haryana Legislative Assembly election: Ellenabad
Party	Candidate	Votes	%	±%
INLD	Abhay Singh Chautala	57,055	37.86	▼8.79
BJP	Pawan Beniwal	45,133	29.95	▼8.92
INC	Bharat Singh Beniwal	35,383	23.48	▲15.73
JJP	O. P. Sihag	6,569	4.36	New
BSP	Advocate Ravinder Balyan	1,947	1.29	▲0.58
LSP	Ram Saroop	998	0.66	New
AAP	Krishan Verma	985	0.65	New
NOTA	Nota	737	0.49	New
Margin of victory		11,922	7.91	▲0.13
Turnout		1,50,684	83.24	▼6.06
Registered electors		1,81,021		▲9.04
INLD hold		Swing	▼8.79	

=== Assembly Election 2014 ===
2014 Haryana Legislative Assembly election: Ellenabad
Party	Candidate	Votes	%	±%
INLD	Abhay Singh Chautala	69,162	46.65	▼4.1
BJP	Pawan Beniwal	57,623	38.87	New
INC	Ramesh Bhadu	11,491	7.75	▼38.12
HLP	Gurjeet Singh Kaura	4,195	2.83	New
BSP	Jas Raj	1,051	0.71	New
HJC(BL)	Kuldeep Bana	925	0.62	New
Independent	Satpal	824	0.56	New
Margin of victory		11,539	7.78	▲2.91
Turnout		1,48,254	89.30	▲0.72
Registered electors		1,66,019		▲15.15
INLD hold		Swing	▼4.10	

=== Assembly By-election 2010 ===
2010 Haryana Legislative Assembly by-election: Ellenabad
Party	Candidate	Votes	%	±%
INLD	Abhay Singh Chautala	64,813	50.75	▼1.16
INC	Bharat Singh Beniwal	58,586	45.87	▲7.17
	Kusum Lata Choudhary	1,353	1.06	New
Independent	Sailender Kumar	1,192	0.93	New
Independent	Vinod Kumar	684	0.54	New
Margin of victory		6,227	4.88	▼8.33
Turnout		1,27,711	88.58	▲2.31
Registered electors		1,44,181		▲0.00
INLD hold		Swing	▼1.16	

=== Assembly Election 2009 ===
2009 Haryana Legislative Assembly election: Ellenabad
Party	Candidate	Votes	%	±%
INLD	Om Prakash Chautala	64,567	51.91	▲7.35
INC	Bharat Singh Beniwal	48,144	38.71	▲13.73
BJP	Amir Chand Mehta	3,618	2.91	▲0.59
HJC(BL)	Devi Lal Beniwal	3,360	2.70	New
BSP	Parshan Singh Khosa	2,605	2.09	▲0.33
Smast Bhartiya Party	Sudhir Kumar Beniwal	816	0.66	New
Independent	Rajeram Kasniya	748	0.60	New
Margin of victory		16,423	13.20	▼6.37
Turnout		1,24,387	86.27	▲7.89
Registered electors		1,44,181		▲1.11
INLD hold		Swing	▲7.35	

=== Assembly Election 2005 ===
2005 Haryana Legislative Assembly election: Ellenabad
Party	Candidate	Votes	%	±%
INLD	Dr. Sushil Kumar Indora	49,803	44.56	▼9.85
INC	Mani Ram	27,920	24.98	▼13.12
Independent	Om Parkash Keharwala	26,972	24.13	New
BJP	Rattan Lal	2,593	2.32	New
BSP	Panna Lal	1,974	1.77	▲0.87
LKD	Nidhan Ram	1,301	1.16	New
Independent	Shish Pal	1,203	1.08	New
Margin of victory		21,883	19.58	▲3.27
Turnout		1,11,774	78.38	▲6.08
Registered electors		1,42,600		▲11.67
INLD hold		Swing	▼9.85	

=== Assembly Election 2000 ===
2000 Haryana Legislative Assembly election: Ellenabad
Party	Candidate	Votes	%	±%
INLD	Bhagi Ram	50,235	54.41	New
INC	Om Parkash S/O Sheo Chand	35,181	38.10	▲19.3
HVP	Karnail Singh	2,441	2.64	▼30.29
CPI	Balwinder Singh	1,741	1.89	▼0.21
Independent	Nidhan Ram	1,405	1.52	New
BSP	Amrik Singh	823	0.89	New
Margin of victory		15,054	16.30	▲8.38
Turnout		92,334	72.74	▼1.77
Registered electors		1,27,698		▲4.17
INLD gain from SAP		Swing	▲13.54	

=== Assembly Election 1996 ===
1996 Haryana Legislative Assembly election: Ellenabad
Party	Candidate	Votes	%	±%
SAP	Bhagi Ram	37,107	40.86	New
HVP	Karnail Singh	29,909	32.94	▲30.68
INC	Mani Ram	17,071	18.80	▼31.82
CPI	Joginder Singh	1,907	2.10	▼0.62
Independent	Bahader Singh	805	0.89	New
Independent	Kulwant	683	0.75	New
Independent	Sucha Singh	661	0.73	New
Independent	Savitri Devi	490	0.54	New
Independent	Bahader Ram	440	0.48	New
Margin of victory		7,198	7.93	▼9.66
Turnout		90,812	76.99	▲4.93
Registered electors		1,22,585		▲8.36
SAP gain from INC		Swing	▼9.75	

=== Assembly Election 1991 ===
1991 Haryana Legislative Assembly election: Ellenabad
Party	Candidate	Votes	%	±%
INC	Mani Ram	39,595	50.61	▲12.11
JP	Bhagi Ram	25,834	33.02	New
Independent	Jagraj Singh	4,536	5.80	New
CPI	Sher Singh	2,129	2.72	New
BJP	Atma Ram	2,043	2.61	New
HVP	Ganga Bishan	1,768	2.26	New
Independent	Babu Lal	789	1.01	New
Margin of victory		13,761	17.59	▼2.64
Turnout		78,228	70.75	▼8.15
Registered electors		1,13,127		▲16.98
INC gain from LKD		Swing	▼8.12	

=== Assembly Election 1987 ===
1987 Haryana Legislative Assembly election: Ellenabad
Party	Candidate	Votes	%	±%
LKD	Bhagi Ram	43,912	58.74	▲6.47
INC	Mani Ram	28,789	38.51	▼4.36
Independent	Amrik Singh	517	0.69	New
Margin of victory		15,123	20.23	▲10.83
Turnout		74,758	78.36	▼0.96
Registered electors		96,705		▲22.33
LKD hold		Swing		

=== Assembly Election 1982 ===
1982 Haryana Legislative Assembly election: Ellenabad
Party	Candidate	Votes	%	±%
LKD	Bhagi Ram	32,341	52.27	New
INC	Mani Ram	26,523	42.87	▲36.57
CPI	Udmi Ram	1,946	3.15	▼4.02
Independent	Hari Ram	657	1.06	New
Independent	Buta Singh	322	0.52	New
Margin of victory		5,818	9.40	▼8.07
Turnout		61,869	79.32	▲16.47
Registered electors		79,052		▲15.30
LKD gain from JP		Swing	▲0.89	

=== Assembly Election 1977 ===
1977 Haryana Legislative Assembly election: Ellenabad
Party	Candidate	Votes	%	±%
JP	Bhagi Ram	21,769	51.38	New
Independent	Mani Ram	14,365	33.91	New
CPI	Prakash Singh	3,034	7.16	▼2.94
INC	Sakhi Ram	2,670	6.30	▼49.46
Independent	Prem Chander	409	0.97	New
Margin of victory		7,404	17.48	▼7.28
Turnout		42,366	62.35	▼11.71
Registered electors		68,560		▲3.07
JP gain from INC		Swing	▼4.38	

=== Assembly Election 1972 ===
1972 Haryana Legislative Assembly election: Ellenabad
Party	Candidate	Votes	%	±%
INC	Brij Lal	27,266	55.76	▲18.92
Independent	Birbal	15,160	31.01	New
CPI	Jaswant Singh	4,939	10.10	New
Independent	Brij Lal	900	1.84	New
SSP	Mahipat	630	1.29	New
Margin of victory		12,106	24.76	▲12.07
Turnout		48,895	74.89	▲3.98
Registered electors		66,516		▲10.05
INC gain from VHP		Swing	▲6.23	

=== Assembly Election 1968 ===
1968 Haryana Legislative Assembly election: Ellenabad
Party	Candidate	Votes	%	±%
VHP	Lal Chand	20,816	49.53	New
INC	Om Prakash	15,485	36.85	▲36.33
ABJS	Pirthi Raj	5,726	13.62	▲13.61
Margin of victory		5,331	12.68	▲5.98
Turnout		42,027	71.40	▼0.86
Registered electors		60,442		▲7.76
VHP gain from INC		Swing		

=== Assembly Election 1967 ===
1967 Haryana Legislative Assembly election: Ellenabad
Party	Candidate	Votes	%	±%
INC	P. Singh	20,208	51.18	New
Independent	Lal Chand	17,561	44.47	New
ABJS	M. Ram	748	1.89	New
Independent	Babu Lal	668	1.69	New
Independent	P. Singh	301	0.76	New
Margin of victory		2,647	6.70	
Turnout		39,486	72.58	
Registered electors		56,092		
INC win (new seat)				

== See also ==
- Ellenabad
- Sirsa district
- List of constituencies of Haryana Legislative Assembly
