= Hukam Singh (Haryana politician) =

8th Chief Minister of Haryana

8th Chief Minister of Haryana
- In office 17 July 1990 – 21 March 1991
- Preceded by: Om Prakash Chautala
- Succeeded by: Om Prakash Chautala

Deputy Chief Minister of Haryana

Personal details
- Born: 26 February 1926 Dhani Phogat, Punjab, British India
- Died: 26 February 2015 (aged 88) Gurgaon, Haryana, India
- Party: Janata Dal

Hukam Singh Phogat (28 February 1926 – 26 February 2015) was an Indian politician and served as Chief Minister of the state of Haryana from 1990 to 1991. Before Chief Minister he had been elected MLA from Charkhi Dadri three times.

== Early life and education ==
Hukam Singh was born on 28 February 1926 at Charkhi Dadri, Haryana (then Bhiwani district, Punjab, British India) to a Hindu Jat family.

== Political career ==
Hukam Singh was elected as MLA first time in 1977 from Dadri, during this time he was also given a ministry. Later on he was elected MLA twice in 1982 and 1987. Being in Janata Dal he was Chief minister from July 1990 to March 1991 and twice as Deputy Chief Minister of Haryana.

Political offices
Preceded by Om Prakash Chautala	Chief Minister of Haryana; 17 July 1990 – 21 March 1991	Succeeded by Om Prakash Chautala
