= Devi Lal =

6th Deputy Prime Minister of India

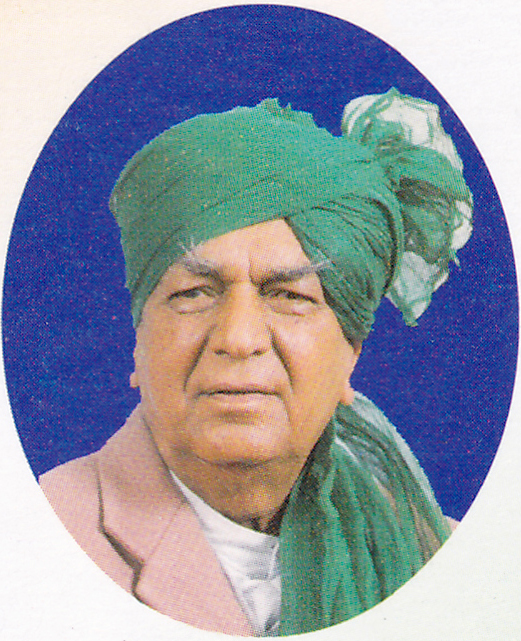
- Postage stamp portrait

Deputy Prime Minister of India
- In office 10 November 1990 – 21 June 1991
- Prime Minister: Chandra Shekhar
- Preceded by: Himself
- Succeeded by: L. K. Advani (2002)
- In office 2 December 1989 – 1 August 1990
- Prime Minister: V. P. Singh
- Preceded by: Yashwantrao Chavan (1980)
- Succeeded by: Himself

Chief Minister of Haryana
- In office 17 July 1987 – 2 December 1989
- Governor: S. M. H. Burney (till 1988); Hari Anand Barari (from 1988)
- Preceded by: Bansi Lal
- Succeeded by: Om Prakash Chautala
- In office 21 June 1977 – 28 June 1979
- Governor: Harcharan Singh Brar
- Preceded by: Banarsi Das Gupta
- Succeeded by: Bhajan Lal

President of Indian National Lok Dal
- In office 17 October 1996 – 6 April 2001
- Succeeded by: Om Prakash Chautala

Member of Parliament, Lok Sabha
- In office 2 December 1989 - 13 March 1991
- Preceded by: Balram Jakhar
- Succeeded by: Balram Jakhar
- Constituency: Sikar, Rajasthan
- In office 18 January 1980 - 31 December 1984
- Preceded by: Mukhtiar Singh Malik
- Succeeded by: Dharam Pal Singh Malik
- Constituency: Sonepat, Haryana

Personal details
- Born: Devi Dayal Sihag; 25 September 1914 Teja Khera, Punjab, British India
- Died: 6 April 2001 (aged 86) New Delhi, Delhi, India
- Party: Indian National Lok Dal (1996–2001)
- Other political affiliations: Indian National Congress (before 1971); Independent (1971–1977); Janata Party (1977–1987); Janata Dal (1988–1990); Samajwadi Janata Party (1990–1996)
- Relations: Ajay Singh Chautala (grandson), Naina Singh Chautala (granddaughter in law), Abhay Singh Chautala (grandson), Dushyant Chautala (great-grandson), Arjun Chautala (great-grandson)
- Children: 4, including Om Prakash Chautala (son) and Ranjit Singh Chautala (son)
- Occupation: Statesman; politician

Devi Lal (25 September 1914 – 6 April 2001) was an Indian statesman and politician who briefly served as the deputy prime minister of India from 1990 to 1991 and previously from 1989 to 1990. Lal emerged as a prominent advocate for rural and agrarian interests, earning the nickname “Tau” (elder uncle) for his grassroots appeal in the politics of Haryana. He twice became chief minister of Haryana (1977–1979 and 1987–1989) and had previously played an important role in the formation of the Haryana state in 1966. He founded the Indian National Lok Dal (INLD) in 1996.

== Early life and personal life ==
Devi Lal was born on 25 September 1914 in Teja Khera village of Sirsa district in present-day Haryana. His mother's name was Shugna Devi and father's name was Lekh Ram Sihag. Lekh Ram was a Jat of Chautala village and owned 2750 bighas (687.5 acres) of land. He received education up to middle-school. His son Om Prakash Chautala has also served as Haryana's chief minister four times.

Lal's ancestral roots lie in Bikaner, Rajasthan, from where his great-grandfather Tejaram had migrated. His father Lekhram relocated to Chautala village in 1919 when Lal was five years old. In 1928 at the age of 16 Lal participated in demonstration by Lala Lajpat Rai. He was a student of "Dev Samaj Public High School Moga" in Moga during his 10th class, at that time was arrested at Congress office in 1930, he quit studies and joined freedom movement. He also took wrestling lesson at an Akhara in Badal village of Punjab. He was first elected MLA in 1952.

Lal comes from a prolific political dynasty of Haryana. His elder brother Sahib Ram Sihag was the first politician from the family who became Congress MLA from Hisar in 1938 and 1947. Lal had four sons, Partap Singh, Om Prakash Chautala, Ranjit Singh and Jagdish Chander. All joined politics except Jagdish who died at a young age. His eldest son, Partap Singh, was an MLA from Indian National Lok Dal in the 1960s.

== Independence movement ==
Lal was a follower of Mahatma Gandhi and was involved in the struggle for India's independence from the British Raj. He left his studies unfinished to take part in the freedom movement.

For this, he was sentenced to one year rigorous imprisonment and sent to Hissar jail on 8 October 1930. He took part in the movement of 1932 and was kept in Sadar Delhi Thana. In 1938 he was selected delegate of All-India Congress Committee. In March 1938 his elder brother was elected a Member of the Legislative Assembly in a by-election on the Congress party ticket. In January 1940, Sahib Ram courted arrest as a satyagrahi in the presence of Lal and over ten thousand people. He was fined Rs 100 and sentenced to 9 months imprisonment.

Lal was arrested on 5 October 1942 and kept in jail for two years for taking part in the 1942 Quit India movement. He was released from prison in October 1943 and he negotiated parole for his elder brother. In August 1944, Chhotu Ram, the then Revenue Minister, visited Chautala village. He, along with Lajpat Rai Alakhpura, made efforts to woo both Sahib Ram and Lal to desert Congress and join the Unionist Party. But both workers, being dedicated freedom fighters, refused to leave the Congress Party.

== Post independence ==
=== Pre-1960: Punjab Assembly politics ===
After independence, Lal emerged as a popular farmer leader in the 1950s and started a farmers' movement, for which he was arrested along with his 500 workers. After some time, then chief minister, Gopi Chand Bhargava, made an agreement and the Muzzara Act was amended. He was elected a member of the Punjab Assembly in 1952 and President of the Punjab Congress in 1956. In 1958, he was elected from Sirsa. From 1962 to 1967, he served as deputy leader of the opposition in the Punjab Assembly.

=== Pre-1980: Haryana Assembly politics ===
He played an active and decisive role in the formation of Haryana as a separate state. In 1971 he left Congress. In the 1972 Vidhan Sabha elections, he contested unsuccessfully against the two Congress heavyweights, Bansi Lal in Tosham constituency and Bhajan Lal in Adampur seat. In 1974 he successfully contested in the Rori constituency. In 1975, Indira Gandhi declared the Emergency and Lal along with all opposition leaders were jailed for 19 months. In 1977, the emergency ended and general elections were held. He was elected on the Janata Party ticket from Bhattu Kalan and became the Chief Minister of Haryana.

=== Post-1980: national and state politics ===
He remained a Member of Parliament from 1980 to 1982 and was a member of State assembly between 1982 and 1987. He formed Lok Dal and started Nyaya Yuddh (en. battle for justice), under the banner of Haryana Sangharsh Samiti, and became hugely popular among masses. In the 1987 state elections, the alliance led by Lal won a record victory winning 85 seats in the 90 member house. Congress won the other five seats. Lal became the chief minister of Haryana for the second time. In the 1989 parliamentary election, he was simultaneously elected, both from Sikar, Rajasthan and Rohtak, Haryana.On 1 December 1989, VP Singh nominated Devi Lal for the post of Prime Minister in the middle house of Parliament, despite Singh himself being nominated as a pure alternative prime ministerial candidate. But the Jat leader of Haryana refused to accept the post of Prime Minister and magnanimously nominated VP Singh for the post of Prime Minister. But the refusal to give the prime ministership to Devilal's close friend Chandrasekhar, who was VP Singh's prime ministerial rival within the Janata Dal, caused surprise among many party members. Because some leaders told him that Devilal will come as the prime ministerial candidate. VP Singh was working honestly in many positions in the Congress and found many allegations of corruption against the government of Rajiv Gandhi. After declaring Singh as a qualified candidate for Prime Minister, Devi Lal walked out of the assembly and refused to participate in the cabinet. He became deputy prime minister of the country from 1989 to 1991 in the non-Congress governments of VP Singh and Chandra Shekhar He was elected to Rajya Sabha in August 1998. Later, his son Om Prakash Chautala also became the chief minister of Haryana.

Lal died on 6 April 2001 at the age of 85. He was cremated at Sangarsh Sthal on the banks of the river Yamuna in New Delhi. "Kisan Ghat" is the samadhi of another popular leader of the farmers, Charan Singh, the fifth Prime Minister of India.

== Political career ==
=== Legislative Assembly service ===
#	From	To	Position	Party
1.	1952	1957	MLA from Sirsa, Punjab	INC
2.	1959	1962	MLA from Sirsa, Punjab	INC
3.	1962	1967	MLA from Fatehabad, Haryana	IND
4.	1977	1980	MLA from Bhattu Kalan, Haryana	JP
5.	1982	1987	MLA from Meham, Haryana	LKD
6.	1987	1991	MLA from Meham, Haryana	LKD

=== Parliamentary service ===
#	From	To	Position	Party
1.	1980	1985	Member of the 7th Lok Sabha from Sonipat, Haryana	JP(S)
2.	1989	1989	Member of the 9th Lok Sabha from Rohtak, Haryana	JD
3.	1989	1991	Member of the 9th Lok Sabha from Sikar, Rajasthan	JD

== See also ==
- First Devi Lal ministry (1977–1979)
- Second Devi Lal ministry (1987–1989)
- Aaya Ram Gaya Ram
- Dynastic politics of Haryana

Political offices
Preceded by Banarsi Das Gupta	Chief Minister of Haryana; 1977–1979	Succeeded by Bhajan Lal
Preceded by Bansi Lal	Chief Minister of Haryana; 1987–1989	Succeeded by Om Prakash Chautala
Preceded by Yashwantrao Chavan	Deputy Prime Minister of India; 1989–1991	Succeeded by Lal Krishna Advani
