= Om Prakash Chautala =

Former Chief Minister of Haryana (1935–2024)

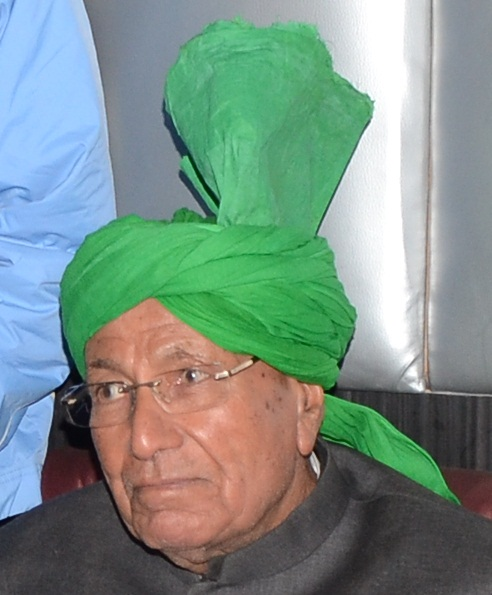

7th Chief Minister of Haryana
- In office 24 July 1999 – 5 March 2005
- Preceded by: Bansi Lal
- Succeeded by: Bhupinder Singh Hooda
- In office 22 March 1991 – 6 April 1991
- Preceded by: Hukam Singh
- Succeeded by: Bhajan Lal
- In office 12 July 1990 – 17 July 1990
- Preceded by: Banarsi Das Gupta
- Succeeded by: Hukam Singh
- In office 2 December 1989 – 22 May 1990
- Preceded by: Chaudhary Devi Lal
- Succeeded by: Banarsi Das Gupta

Leader of Opposition, Haryana Legislative Assembly
- In office 27 February 2005 – 27 October 2014
- Preceded by: Vacant (himself in 1996)
- Succeeded by: Abhay Singh Chautala

President of the Indian National Lok Dal
- In office 6 April 2001 – 20 December 2024
- Preceded by: Devi Lal
- Succeeded by: Abhay Singh Chautala

Personal details
- Born: Om Prakash Sihag; 1 January 1935 Chautala, Punjab, British India
- Died: 20 December 2024 (aged 89) Gurgaon, Haryana, India
- Party: Indian National Lok Dal
- Spouse: Sneh Lata Chautala (died 2019)
- Children: 5, including Ajay Singh Chautala and Abhay Singh Chautala
- Parent: Devi Lal (father)
- Occupation: Agriculturalist
- Profession: Politician

Om Prakash Chautala (1 January 1935 – 20 December 2024) was an Indian politician who served as the Chief Minister of Haryana for five terms between 1989 and 2005. A member of the Indian National Lok Dal (INLD), he also served as the Leader of the Opposition in the Haryana Legislative Assembly from 2005 to 2014.

He was the son of Devi Lal, a former Deputy Prime Minister of India and two-time Chief Minister of Haryana. In 2013, Chautala was convicted in a teacher recruitment scam, resulting in a prison sentence that made him the oldest inmate of Delhi's Tihar Jail at the age of 87.

== Early and personal life ==
Om Prakash Chautala was born on 1 January 1935 to Devi Lal, a prominent politician who later served as the Deputy Prime Minister of India. His family belongs to the Sihag clan of the Jat community.

He was married to Sneh Lata, who died in August 2019. The couple had five children: two sons, Ajay Singh Chautala and Abhay Singh Chautala, and three daughters.

Several of Chautala's descendants entered politics, establishing a prominent political dynasty in Haryana. His son, Abhay Singh Chautala, served as the Leader of the Opposition in the Haryana Legislative Assembly from 2014 to 2019 and represented the Ellenabad constituency as a member of the Haryana Legislative Assembly. His grandson, Dushyant Chautala (son of Ajay Chautala), served as a Member of Parliament in the Lok Sabha from the Hisar constituency from 2014 to 2019 and later as the Deputy Chief Minister of Haryana from 2019 to 2024.

== Political career ==
=== Tenures as Chief Minister ===
Chautala served as the Chief Minister of Haryana across five distinct terms between 1989 and 2005, though he completed a full five-year term only during his final stint in office. He first assumed the office of Chief Minister on 2 December 1989 without being an elected member of the legislative assembly. After multiple by-election cancellations, he won a seat representing the Darba Kalan constituency, but was forced to resign on 22 May 1990 following controversy regarding the death of an independent candidate; he was succeeded by Banarsi Das Gupta. His second term lasted only five days, from 12 July 1990 until his resignation on 17 July 1990 due to intra-party pressure, after which he was succeeded by Hukam Singh. He assumed office for a third time on 22 March 1991, but resigned on 6 April 1991, leading to the imposition of President's rule in Haryana due to political instability.

After eight years out of power, Chautala returned to office for his fourth term on 24 July 1999 with the external support of the Bharatiya Janata Party (BJP) after removing the incumbent government led by Bansi Lal. Following the 2000 Haryana Legislative Assembly elections, in which the INLD secured an absolute majority, he formed his fifth government on 2 March 2000. He completed this term and remained in office until 5 March 2005, when the INLD was defeated in the state assembly elections. At the national level, Chautala aligned his party with both the National Democratic Alliance (NDA) and various non-aligned Third Front coalitions throughout his career.

=== Imprisonment and education ===
In 2013, Chautala was sentenced to 10 years in prison for his involvement in a junior basic trained teacher recruitment scam. He was released early from Tihar Jail on 2 July 2021 under a Delhi government special remission initiative meant to decrease prison congestion during the COVID-19 pandemic. While serving his prison sentence, Chautala continued his formal education, successfully clearing his Class 10 and Class 12 board examinations by 2021 at the age of 87.

== Controversies ==
=== Teachers' recruitment scam ===
In June 2008, the Central Bureau of Investigation (CBI) charged Chautala and 53 others in connection with the illegal appointment of 3,206 junior basic trained teachers in Haryana between 1999 and 2000. The probe was initiated following a Supreme Court order based on a writ petition filed by Sanjeev Kumar, a 1989-batch IAS officer and former director of primary education in the state.

In January 2013, a special CBI court in New Delhi found Chautala and his son, Ajay Singh Chautala, guilty of corruption, cheating, forgery, and criminal conspiracy under the Indian Penal Code and the Prevention of Corruption Act. They were sentenced to ten years of rigorous imprisonment for their roles in manipulating selection merit lists to recruit unqualified teachers. The conviction and sentence were subsequently upheld upon appeal by both the Delhi High Court and the Supreme Court of India. Chautala was released from Tihar Jail in July 2021 after completing his sentence under a special remission initiative granted by the Delhi government during the COVID-19 pandemic.

=== Disproportionate assets case ===
In April 2006, the CBI registered a separate case against Chautala following a complaint by Haryana Congress leader Shamsher Singh Surjewala. The investigation alleged that while serving as Chief Minister between 1993 and 2006, Chautala accumulated wealth and properties vastly exceeding his known, legitimate sources of income. The agency filed a formal chargesheet in March 2010, estimating the accumulated value of the unauthorized assets at approximately ₹6.09 crore.

On 27 May 2022, a special CBI court convicted Chautala under the Prevention of Corruption Act, sentencing him to four years of rigorous imprisonment and imposing a fine of ₹50 lakh. The court also ordered the state confiscation of four of his major assets. At 87 years old, the conviction made him the oldest inmate held at Tihar Jail. In August 2022, the Delhi High Court suspended his prison sentence during the pendency of his formal appeal against the conviction, taking into account his age, physical health limitations, and the time he had already spent in custody during the trial.

== Death ==
Chautala died from a cardiac arrest at his residence in Gurugram on 20 December 2024, at the age of 89. Following his demise, the Government of Haryana declared a three-day period of official state mourning and a public holiday.

On 21 December 2024, his last rites were performed with full state honours at his family's Teja Khera farmhouse in the Sirsa district. The funeral was attended by various public dignitaries, including Vice President Jagdeep Dhankhar, Union Minister Manohar Lal Khattar, and Haryana Chief Minister Nayab Singh Saini.

== See also ==
- Political families of Haryana

Political offices
| Preceded by Devi Lal | Chief Minister of Haryana; 2 December 1989 - 22 May 1990 | Succeeded by Banarsi Das Gupta |
| Preceded by Banarsi Das Gupta | Chief Minister of Haryana; 12 July 1990 - 17 July 1990 | Succeeded by Hukam Singh |
| Preceded by Hukam Singh | Chief Minister of Haryana; 22 March 1991 - 6 April 1991 | Succeeded by President's rule |
| Preceded by Bansi Lal | Chief Minister of Haryana; 24 July 1999 - 5 March 2005 | Succeeded by Bhupinder Singh Hooda |
