= Deputy Prime Minister of India =

Deputy head of the government of India

Deputy Prime Minister of the Republic of India
- Bhārat Ke Upapradhānamantrī
- State Emblem of India

- Flag of India
- Incumbent; Vacant since 23 May 2004
- Government of India
- Style: The Honourable (formal); His Excellency (diplomatic); Mr. Deputy Prime Minister (informal)
- Type: Deputy Head of government
- Status: Deputy Leader of the Executive
- Abbreviation: DPM
- Member of: Parliament of India; Union Council of Ministers
- Reports to: President of India; Vice President of India; Prime Minister of India; Parliament of India
- Nominator: Prime Minister of India
- Appointer: President of India
- Term length: At the pleasure of the president; Lok Sabha term is 5 years unless dissolved sooner; No term limits specified
- Constituting instrument: Not mentioned in the Constitution of India
- Formation: 15 August 1947; 79 years, 91 days ago
- First holder: Vallabhbhai Patel
- Final holder: L. K. Advani

The deputy prime minister of India (IAST: Bhārat Ke Upapradhānamantrī), although not a Constitutional post, is the second-highest ranking minister of the Union in the executive branch of the Government of India and is a senior member of the Union Council of Ministers. The office holder also deputizes for the prime minister in their absence.

The sitting deputy prime minister ranks 5A below Living former presidents and above Chief Justice of India and Speaker of the Lok Sabha in the Order of Precedence of India and is nominated by prime minister and appointed by the president of India.

The longest-serving deputy prime minister was the first deputy prime minister, Vallabhbhai Patel, whose tenure lasted 3 years and 122 days. His premiership was followed by Morarji Desai, Charan Singh, Jagjivan Ram, Yashwantrao Chavan, Devi Lal and L.K. Advani.

The office has since been only intermittently occupied, having been occupied for a little more than 10 years out of the 75 years since its inception. Since 1950 India has had 7 deputy prime ministers, of which none having at least one full term.

== Origins and history ==
India follows a parliamentary system in which the deputy prime minister is the presiding deputy head of the government and deputy chief of the executive of the government. The deputy prime minister must become a member of parliament within six months of beginning their tenure, if they are not one already.

=== 1947–1950 ===
Since 1947, there have been 7 different deputy prime ministers. The first was Vallabhbhai Patel of the Indian National Congress party, who was sworn in on 15 August 1947, when India gained independence from the British Raj. Serving until his death in December 1950, Patel remains India's longest-serving deputy prime minister.

=== 1967–1969 ===
After Patel, the post was vacant until Morarji Desai became the second deputy prime minister in 1967 and has the second-longest tenure. Morarji Desai and Charan Singh were the deputy prime ministers who later became Prime Minister of India.

After Desai, the post was vacant again for almost 10 years.

=== 1979–1980 ===
In less than a year there were 3 different deputy prime ministers, Charan Singh and Jagjivan Ram became deputy prime ministers simultaneously under one ministry, and they were consecutively followed by Yashwantrao Chavan without any break, who became deputy prime minister in a different ministry.

After Chavan, the post was vacant again for almost 10 years.

=== 1989–1991 ===
Devi Lal is the only deputy prime minister to represent both parties in the same post. The post was vacant for 100 days between the two terms of Devi Lal.

After Lal, the post was vacant again for more than 11 years.

=== 2002–2004 ===
Lal Krishna Advani was the seventh person to serve as the deputy prime minister of India, until the post became vacant.

== List ==
Key

- ^{†} Assassinated or died in office
- ^{§} Returned to office after a previous non-consecutive term
- ^{RES} Resigned
- ^{NC} Resigned following a no-confidence motion

Portrait	Name (born – died) Constituency	Age when assumed office	Term of office Duration in years and days		Concurrent ministerial positions	Party	Ministry	Prime Minister
	Vallabhbhai Patel (1875–1950) Bombay (Constituent Assembly)	71 years 288 days	15 August 1947	15 December 1950^{[†]}	Minister of Home Affairs and States; Minister of Information and Broadcasting (1947–1949)	Indian National Congress	Nehru I	Jawaharlal Nehru
	Vallabhbhai Patel (1875–1950) Bombay (Constituent Assembly)	71 years 288 days	3 years, 122 days		Minister of Home Affairs and States; Minister of Information and Broadcasting (1947–1949)	Indian National Congress	Nehru I	Jawaharlal Nehru
Position Vacant (15 December 1950 – 13 March 1967) – 16 years, 88 days,
	Morarji Desai (1896–1995) MP for Surat	71 years 40 days	13 March 1967	19 July 1969^{[RES]}	Minister of Finance (1967–1969)	Indian National Congress	Indira II	Indira Gandhi
	Morarji Desai (1896–1995) MP for Surat	71 years 40 days	2 years, 128 days		Minister of Finance (1967–1969)	Indian National Congress	Indira II	Indira Gandhi
Position Vacant (19 July 1969 – 24 January 1979) – 9 years, 189 days
	Charan Singh (1902–1987) MP for Baghpat	76 years 32 days	24 January 1979	16 July 1979^{[RES]}	Minister of Finance	Janata Party	Desai	Morarji Desai
	Charan Singh (1902–1987) MP for Baghpat	76 years 32 days	173 days		Minister of Finance	Janata Party	Desai	Morarji Desai
	Jagjivan Ram (1908–1986) MP for Sasaram	70 years 294 days	24 January 1979	28 July 1979^{[RES]}	Minister of Defence	Janata Party	Desai	Morarji Desai
	Jagjivan Ram (1908–1986) MP for Sasaram	70 years 294 days	185 days		Minister of Defence	Janata Party	Desai	Morarji Desai
	Yashwantrao Chavan (1913–1984) MP for Satara	66 years 138 days	28 July 1979	14 January 1980	Minister of Home Affairs	Indian National Congress	Charan	Charan Singh
	Yashwantrao Chavan (1913–1984) MP for Satara	66 years 138 days	170 days		Minister of Home Affairs	Indian National Congress	Charan	Charan Singh
Position Vacant (14 January 1980 – 2 December 1989) – 9 years, 322 days
	Devi Lal (1914–2001) MP for Sikar	75 years 68 days	2 December 1989	1 August 1990^{[RES]}	Minister of Agriculture	Janata Dal	Singh	V. P. Singh
	Devi Lal (1914–2001) MP for Sikar	75 years 68 days	242 days		Minister of Agriculture	Janata Dal	Singh	V. P. Singh
Position Vacant (1 August 1990 – 10 November 1990) – 101 days
	Devi Lal (1914–2001) MP for Sikar	76 years 57 days	10 November 1990	21 June 1991^{[RES]}	Minister of Agriculture (1990–1991); Minister of Tourism (1990–1991)	Samajwadi Janata Party	Shekhar	Chandra Shekhar
	Devi Lal (1914–2001) MP for Sikar	76 years 57 days	223 days		Minister of Agriculture (1990–1991); Minister of Tourism (1990–1991)	Samajwadi Janata Party	Shekhar	Chandra Shekhar
Position Vacant (21 June 1991 – 29 June 2002) – 11 years, 8 days
	Lal Krishna Advani (born 1927) MP for Gandhinagar	74 years 233 days	29 June 2002	22 May 2004	Minister of Home Affairs; Minister of Coal and Mines (2002); Minister of Personnel, Public Grievances and Pensions (2003–2004)	Bharatiya Janata Party	Vajpayee III	Atal Bihari Vajpayee
	Lal Krishna Advani (born 1927) MP for Gandhinagar	74 years 233 days	1 year, 328 days		Minister of Home Affairs; Minister of Coal and Mines (2002); Minister of Personnel, Public Grievances and Pensions (2003–2004)	Bharatiya Janata Party	Vajpayee III	Atal Bihari Vajpayee
Position Vacant (22 May 2004 – present) – 22 years, 176 days

== List of deputy prime ministers by length of term ==
No.	Name	Party		Length of term	
No.	Name	Party		Longest continuous term	Total years of deputy prime ministership
1	Vallabhbhai Patel	INC		3 years, 122 days	
2	Morarji Desai	INC		2 years, 128 days	
3	Lal Krishna Advani	BJP		1 year, 328 days	
4	Devi Lal	JD	SJP(R)	242 days	1 year, 100 days
5	Jagjivan Ram	JP		185 days	
6	Charan Singh	JP		173 days	
7	Yashwantrao Chavan	INC(U)		170 days	

Timeline

== List by party ==
Fraction of time of holding DPMO by party (excluding Vacant)
1. Indian National Congress (57.9%)
2. Bharatiya Janata Party (19.3%)
3. Janata Dal (6.74%)
4. Samajwadi Janata Party (Rashtriya) (6.21%)
5. Janata Party (5.15%)
6. Indian National Congress (Urs) (4.74%)

Political parties by total timespan of their member holding Deputy Prime Minister's Office (14 November 2026)
No.	Political party	Number of Deputy Prime ministers	Total days of holding DPMO
1	Indian National Congress	2	2077 days
2	Bharatiya Janata Party	1	693 days
3	Janata Dal	1	242 days
4	Samajwadi Janata Party (Rashtriya)	1	223 days
5	Janata Party	2	185 days
6	Indian National Congress (Urs)	1	170 days

=== Parties by total duration (in days) of holding Deputy Prime Minister's Office ===
- INC
- BJP
- JD
- SJP(R)
- JP
- INC(U)

== See also ==
- President of India
- List of presidents of India
- Vice President of India
- List of vice presidents of India
- Prime Minister of India
- List of prime ministers of India
