= Indian National Lok Dal =

Political party in India

- Abbreviation: INLD
- Chairperson: Abhay Singh Chautala
- Founder: Chaudhary Devi Lal
- Founded: 17 October 1996
- Preceded by: Samajwadi Janata Party (Rashtriya)
- Headquarters: MLA Flat No. 47, Sector-4, Chandigarh, India – 160004
- Student wing: INLD Students Organization
- Ideology: Regionalism; Farmers' rights
- Political position: Centre
- ECI status: Recognised
- Alliance: BSP (2023–24); NDA (1998–2004; 2008–09)
- Seats in Rajya Sabha: 0 / 245
- Seats in Lok Sabha: 0 / 543
- Seats in Haryana Legislative Assembly: 2 / 90

Election symbol

The Indian National Lok Dal (INLD) is a political party based primarily in the Indian state of Haryana. It was initially founded as the Haryana Lok Dal (Rashtriya) by Devi Lal in 1996, who served as the Deputy Prime Minister of India.

The party emerged as a significant voice advocating for farmers' rights and rural development in the state of Haryana. It has played a crucial role in advocating for agricultural reforms and regional development as well. The party is generally considered to adhere to the ideology of regionalism and follows a centrist position within the spectrum of India's politics.

The party is led by Abhay Singh Chautala, who is the son of Om Prakash Chautala, and the grandson of Devi Lal. Both Om Prakash and Devi Lal had served as the Chief Minister of Haryana. Prakash Bharti is the current General Secretary.

On 27 January 2021, Abhay Singh Chautala had resigned as the only MLA from the party citing the BJP-led Union government's refusal to accept farmers' demands. He was later re-elected from the Ellenabad constituency in a bypoll election on 2 November 2021.

== List of incumbent party presidents ==
Position	Name
National President	Abhay Singh Chautala
Secretary General	Prakash Bharti
National Vice-president	R.S. Choudhary, Sher Singh Barshami
State President, Haryana	Rampal Majra
State Vice-president, Haryana	Mrs. Rekha Rana, Habib Ur Rehman, Rao Hoshiar Singh, Bhopal Singh Bhati, Raj Singh Mor
State General Secretary, Haryana	Mahendra Singh Chauhan, Rajesh Godara, Dr Sitaram, Om Prakash Gora, Dilbag Singh, Sunil Lamba, Rameshwar Das, Mangat Ram Saini, Naresh Sharma and Ram Kumar Aibla
State Secretary, Haryana	Dr KC Kajal, Satbir Badhesara, Jagtar Singh Sandhu, Tayyab Hussain Bhimshika, Anand Sheoran, Sushil Kumar Gautam, Pala Ram Rathi, Ramesh Kumar, Ram Rattan Kashyap, Jogiram, Joginder Malik
State Organization Secretary, Haryana	Ranveer Mandola
State Treasurer, Haryana	Manoj Aggarwal
Chairman of the Policy and Programming Committee	M.S. Malik
Chairman of the Disciplinary Action Committee	Sher Singh Badshami
Office Secretary	S. Nachhatar Singh Malhan
Media Coordinator	Rakesh Sihag

INLD Students Organization (ISO) is the official student wing of INLD. Shri Arjun Chautala is the national Incharge and Adv Raman Dhaka is the Secretary General of ISO.

== List of prominent members ==
Name	Position/Title	Constituency
Devi Lal	former deputy prime minister of India	–
Om Prakash Chautala	former four-term chief minister of Haryana	–
Abhay Singh Chautala	former Leader of the Opposition in the Haryana Assembly	–
Rampal Majra	Former CPS and MLA	Kalayat and Pai
Habib Ur Rehman	former MLA	Nuh
Rekha Rana	former MLA	Gharaunda
Chaudhary Dheerpal Singh	former five-term MLA	Badli

== History ==
Chaudhary Devi Lal, following his triumph in the election for the Rori constituency to the Haryana Legislative Assembly in 1974, established the Bharatiya Lok Dal. Subsequently, the Indian National Lok Dal (INLD) emerged in 1987 after the assembly election. The electoral battles of 1982 and 1987 were waged under the banner of Lok Dal (LKD), marking a transitional phase for the party. Notably, in 1998, the party underwent a rebranding, adopting its current name.

The party's political affiliations saw it become a constituent of the National Democratic Alliance (NDA). Consequently, it contributed to the governance helmed by the Bharatiya Janata Party from 1998 to 2004 on the federal stage.

The Indian National Lok Dal (INLD) has faced a series of electoral setbacks, notably performing below expectations in each of the four successive general elections conducted since 1998. It has experienced a string of defeats in the Haryana assembly elections, facing losses in the years 2005, 2009, and 2014. Moreover, despite forming an alliance with the Bharatiya Janata Party (BJP) in 2009, the party encountered disappointment by failing to secure any seats in the Lok Sabha during both the 2004 and 2009 general elections.

During the 1999 Lok Sabha elections, the INLD forged an electoral alliance with the BJP in Haryana. Each party contested five out of the ten seats in the state, resulting in a clean sweep with all ten candidates securing victories. Subsequently, in 2000, Chautala clinched his fifth term as the Chief Minister of Haryana. The INLD exhibited strong performance in the state assembly elections, securing 47 out of the 90 available seats. However, following this success, the party opted to sever ties with the BJP, consequently departing from both the National Democratic Alliance (NDA) and the government. The 2004 electoral contest saw the party vying for 20 Lok Sabha seats across Haryana, Rajasthan, Uttar Pradesh, and Chandigarh. Unfortunately, a majority of these candidates, numbering 14, failed to retain their deposits. Specifically, in Haryana, the INLD's 10 candidates managed to secure 22.43% of the votes. Meanwhile, in Rajasthan, 5 candidates garnered 0.52% of the votes, 4 candidates in Uttar Pradesh secured a mere 0.02%, and the sole candidate in Chandigarh amassed 6.61% of the votes.

In the subsequent 2005 Haryana state assembly elections, the INLD faced a substantial setback, losing its majority by securing only 9 out of the 90 available seats. This marked a significant decline compared to the Congress party's sweeping victory, clinching 67 seats during the same electoral contest. In 2009, the INLD won 31 seats.

On 16 January 2013, Om Prakash Chautala and Ajay Chautala were sent jail after a New Delhi court sentenced them to ten years imprisonment under various provisions of the IPC and the Prevention of Corruption Act. In the 16th Lok Sabha elections, the INLD won on two seats. Dushyant Chautala was elected from the Hisar Lok Sabha constituency and Charanjeet Singh Rori was elected for a Sirsa Lok Sabha constituency.

In Rohtak at Chhotu Ram Stadium, INLD made the Guinness World Records for having supporters apply for 10,450 eye donations in 8 hours. In the 2014 Legislative Assembly election, the INLD won 19 seats and became the Opposition party in the state, earning more seats than the Congress party. Abhay Singh Chautala was elected as the Leader of the Opposition in the Haryana Legislative Assembly.

Jannayak Janta Party emerged from a split in the Indian National Lok Dal (INLD) which itself had been caused by infighting among the Chautala family. An INLD rally at Gohana in October 2018 had seen heckling of Abhay Chautala, a son of INLD leader Om Prakash Chautala for which Dushyant Chautala, a grandson, and his younger brother, Digvijay Chautala, were blamed. The JJP was formally launched at a rally in Jind in December 2018 by Dushyant Chautala who held a seat in the Lok Sabha of the national Parliament of India, from when he was an INLD member.

For the 2019 Haryana Legislative Assembly election, they forged an alliance with Shiromani Akali Dal. Previously, both parties fought elections together but their alliance fell in 2017 over the issue of the Sutlej Yamuna link canal. Abhay Singh Chautala was elected as the lone MLA of the party.

On 27 January 2021, Abhay Singh Chautala had resigned as the only MLA from the party citing the BJP-led Union government's refusal to accept farmers' demands. He was later re-elected from the Ellenabad constituency in a bypoll election on 2 November 2021.

On 25 February 2024, preceding the 2024 Indian general election, Haryana INLD State Vice-president, Nafe Singh Rathee was shot dead by unidentified gunmen who ambushed his SUV in the Jhajjar district. Rathee and his associates were inside the vehicle when the men, who came in a car, opened fire, and fled. Another party leader who was travelling with him also died while two others were critically injured.

Before the 2024 Indian general election, Abhay Singh Chautala formed an alliance with Haryana Nationalist Congress Party (SP) Chief Virender Verma to contest from the Karnal Lok Sabha constituency against Manohar Lal Khattar. Abhay Singh Chautala and the Indian National Lok Dal (INLD) party extended full support to Virender Verma.

In July 2024, before the 2024 Haryana Legislative Assembly election, INLD decided to contest elections in alliance with the Bahujan Samaj Party (BSP), where the latter will contest 27 seats and the former shall contest the rest. The party managed to win two seats, one more than last time.

== Electoral performance ==
=== Haryana Legislative Assembly elections ===
Vidhan Sabha Term	Assembly Elections	Seats Contested	Seats Won	% of votes	Party Votes	Ref
10th Vidhan Sabha	2000	62	47	29.6	22,66,131	
11th Vidhan Sabha	2005	89	9	26.8	24,52,488	
12th Vidhan Sabha	2009	88	31	25.8	24,47,147	
13th Vidhan Sabha	2014	88	19	24.2	29,96,203	
14th Vidhan Sabha	2019	81	1	2.5	3,06,028	
15th Vidhan Sabha	2024	51	2	4.1	5,75,192	

=== Lok Sabha elections ===
Lok Sabha Term	Indian General election	Seats contested	Seats won	Votes Polled	% of votes	Ref.
13th Lok Sabha	1999	5	5	20,02,700	28.7	
14th Lok Sabha	2004	10	0	18,15,683	22.4	
15th Lok Sabha	2009	5	0	12,86,573	15.8	
16th Lok Sabha	2014	10	2	27,99,899	24.4	
17th Lok Sabha	2019	10	0	2,40,258	1.90	
18th Lok Sabha	2024	7	0	2,26,052	1.74	

== List of Chief Ministers ==
No	Name	Constituency	Term of office	Days in office	Assembly (Elections)	align=center style="height: 60px;"	rowspan=2! 1	Om Prakash Chautala	Uchana Kalan	2 December 1989	22 May 1990	171 days	Seventh Assembly (1987 elections)	Janata Dal|
22 March 1989	6 April 1989	Seventh Assembly (1989 elections) | Samajwadi Janata Party	Narwana	24 July 1999	3 March 2000	5 years, 223 days	Ninth Assembly (1996 elections)	Om Prakash Chautala	Uchana Kalan	INLD |		171 days		
3 March 2000	4 March 2005	Tenth Assembly (2000 elections)	Narwana			5 years, 223 days				INLD |				

== See also ==
- Aaya Ram Gaya Ram
- Dynastic politics of Haryana
- List of political parties in India
