= Haryana Legislative Assembly =

Unicameral state legislature in India

- 15th Haryana Assembly

Type
- Type: Unicameral
- Term limits: 5 years

Leadership
- Speaker: Harvinder Kalyan, BJP since 8 October 2024
- Deputy Speaker: Krishan Lal Middha, BJP since 8 October 2024
- Chief Minister (Leader of the House): Nayab Singh Saini, BJP since 12 March 2024
- Leader of the Opposition: Bhupinder Singh Hooda, INC since 29 September 2025
- Assembly Secretary: Rajender Kumar Nandal

Structure
- Seats: 90
- Political groups: Government (51): BJP (48); IND (3); Opposition (39): INC (37) (Note: Five members were suspended by party because of their anti-party activities. These are Shalli Chaudhary, Renu Bala, Mohammad Illyas, Mohammad Israil and Jarnail Singh, thus they are not bound by the decisions of the legislative party in assembly, however, officially they are still member of the party as their party affiliation is yet to be decided by the speaker); INLD (2)

Elections
- Voting system: First past the post
- Last election: 5 October 2024
- Next election: 2029

Meeting place
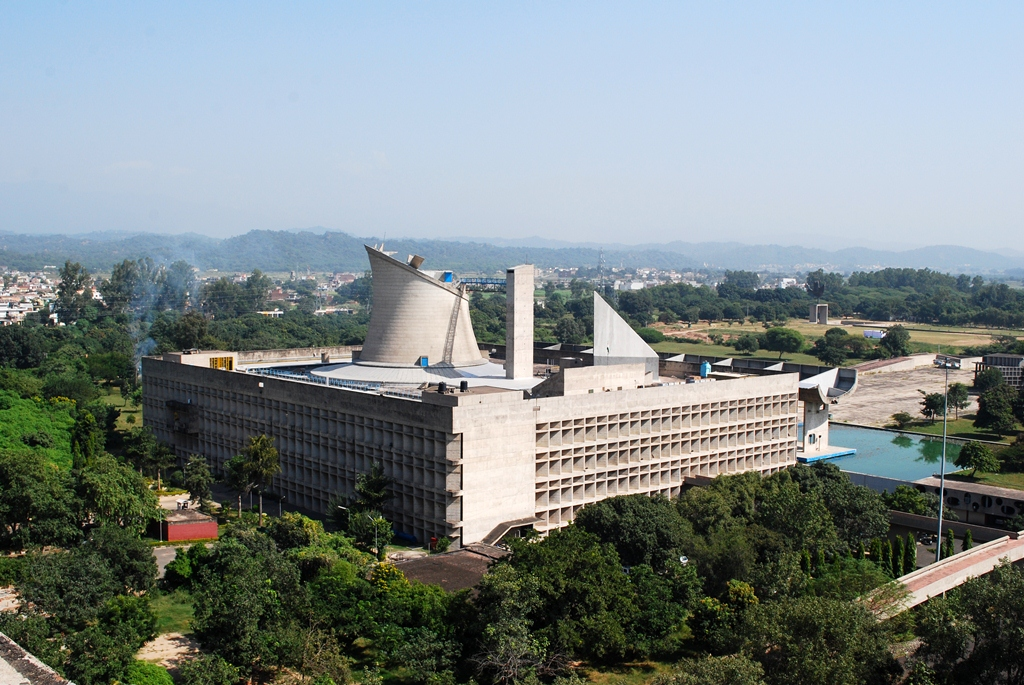
- Palace of Assembly, Chandigarh, India

Website
- haryanaassembly.gov.in

The Haryana Legislative Assembly (ISO: Hariyāṇā Vidhāna Sabhā) is the unicameral legislature of the Indian state of Haryana. The seating of the assembly is at Chandigarh, the capital of the state. There are 90 seats in the house filled by direct election using a single-member first-past-the-post voting system. The term of office is five years.

== Significance ==
Council of Ministers of Haryana is responsible to Haryana Legislative Assembly.

== History ==
The body was founded in 1966, when the state was created from part of the state of Punjab, by the Punjab Reorganisation Act, 1966. The house initially had 54 seats, ten reserved for scheduled castes, this was increased to 81 seats in March 1967, and to 90 seats (including 17 reserved seats) in 1977. The highest number of seats ever won was in 1977 when Janata Party won 75 out of 90 seats in the aftermath of the 1975–77 emergency by Indian National Congress's (INC) Indira Gandhi. INC won only 3 seats, Vishal Haryana Party and independents both won 5 seats each.

Since the formation of Haryana in 1966, the state politics became infamously dominated by the nepotistic clans of five political dynasts, Lal trio (Devi Lal, Bansi Lal and Bhajan Lal) as well as the Hooda clan and Rao Birender clan. The Mewat region, remotely to the rest of Haryana since its formation, has been dominated by three major political dynasts (Tayyab Husain, Rahim Khan, Khurshid Ahmed). The infamous Aaya Ram Gaya Ram politics, named after Gaya Lal in 1967, of frequent floor-crossing, turncoating, switching parties and political horse trading within short span of time became associated with Haryana.

Election	Legislative Assembly	From	To	First sitting
1962	1st Assembly	1 November 1966	28 February 1967	6 December 1966
1967	2nd Assembly	17 March 1967	21 November 1967	17 March 1967
1968	3rd Assembly	15 July 1968	21 January 1972	15 July 1968
1972	4th Assembly	3 April 1972	30 April 1977	3 April 1972
1977	5th Assembly	4 July 1977	19 April 1982	4 July 1977
1982	6th Assembly	24 June 1982	23 June 1987	24 June 1982
1987	7th Assembly	9 July 1987	6 April 1991	9 July 1987
1991	8th Assembly	9 July 1991	10 May 1996	9 July 1991
1996	9th Assembly	22 May 1996	14 December 1999	22 May 1996
2000	10th Assembly	9 March 2000	8 March 2005	9 March 2000
2005	11th Assembly	21 March 2005	21 August 2009	21 March 2005
2009	12th Assembly	28 October 2009	20 October 2014	28 October 2009
2014	13th Assembly	20 October 2014	28 October 2019	27 October 2014
2019	14th Assembly	28 October 2019	8 October 2024	4 November 2019
2024	15th Assembly	8 October 2024		

== Floor Leaders and Ministers ==
Designation	Name
Governor	Ashim Kumar Ghosh
Speaker	Harvinder Kalyan
Deputy Speaker	Krishan Lal Middha
Leader of the House	Nayab Singh Saini
Leader of Opposition	Bhupinder Singh Hooda
Secretary of Legislative Assembly	Rajender Kumar Nandal

Haryana Legislative Assembly constituencies, reserved constituencies in yellow.

== List of Assemblies ==
The elections for the Haryana Vidhan Sabha are being held since 1967.

Year	Legislative Assembly Election	Party	Chief Minister	Seat split
1966	First Assembly*	Indian National Congress	Bhagwat Dayal Sharma	Constituted out of Punjab assembly
1967	Second Assembly	Indian National Congress	Bhagwat Dayal Sharma	Total: 81. INC: 48, BJS: 12, Independents: 16
1967	Second Assembly	Vishal Haryana Party (Note: defected from Indian National Congress)	Rao Birender Singh	Total: 81. INC: 48, BJS: 12, Independents: 16
1968	Third Assembly	Indian National Congress	Bansi Lal	Total: 81. INC: 48, VHP: 16, BJS: 7
1972	Fourth Assembly	Indian National Congress	Bansi Lal	Total: 81. INC: 52, NCO: 12
1972	Fourth Assembly	Indian National Congress	Banarsi Das Gupta	Total: 81. INC: 52, NCO: 12
1977	Fifth Assembly	Janata Party	Chaudhary Devi Lal	Total: 90. Janata: 75, VHP: 5, INC: 3
1977	Fifth Assembly	Janata Party	Bhajan Lal	Total: 90. Janata: 75, VHP: 5, INC: 3
1982	Sixth Assembly	Indian National Congress	Bhajan Lal	Total: 90. INC: 36, Lok Dal: 31 + BJP: 6, Independents: 16
1982	Sixth Assembly	Indian National Congress	Bansi Lal	Total: 90. INC: 36, Lok Dal: 31 + BJP: 6, Independents: 16
1987	Seventh Assembly	Janata Dal	Chaudhary Devi Lal	Total: 90. Janata Dal: 60 + BJP: 16, INC: 5
1987	Seventh Assembly	Janata Dal	Om Prakash Chautala	Total: 90. Janata Dal: 60 + BJP: 16, INC: 5
1987	Seventh Assembly	Janata Dal	Banarsi Das Gupta	Total: 90. Janata Dal: 60 + BJP: 16, INC: 5
1987	Seventh Assembly	Janata Dal	Om Prakash Chautala	Total: 90. Janata Dal: 60 + BJP: 16, INC: 5
1987	Seventh Assembly	Janata Dal	Hukam Singh Phogat	Total: 90. Janata Dal: 60 + BJP: 16, INC: 5
1987	Seventh Assembly	Samajwadi Janata Party	Om Prakash Chautala	Total: 90. Janata Dal: 60 + BJP: 16, INC: 5
1987	Seventh Assembly	Indian National Lok Dal	Parmanand Adhir	Total: 90. Janata Dal: 60 + BJP: 16, INC: 5
1991	Eighth Assembly	Indian National Congress	Bhajan Lal	Total: 90. INC: 51
1996	Ninth Assembly	Haryana Vikas Party	Bansi Lal	Total: 90. HVP: 33 + BJP: 11, SAP: 24, INC: 9
1996	Ninth Assembly	Indian National Lok Dal	Om Prakash Chautala	Total: 90. HVP: 33 + BJP: 11, SAP: 24, INC: 9
2000	Tenth Assembly	Indian National Lok Dal	Om Prakash Chautala	Total: 90. INLD: 47 + BJP: 6, INC: 21
2005	Eleventh Assembly	Indian National Congress	Bhupinder Singh Hooda	Total: 90. INC: 67, INLD: 9
2009	Twelfth Assembly	Indian National Congress	Bhupinder Singh Hooda	Total: 90. INC: 40, INLD: 31, HJC(BL): 6, BJP: 4
2014	Thirteenth Assembly	Bharatiya Janata Party	Manohar Lal Khattar	Total: 90. BJP: 47 (post-defections 52), INLD: 19, INC: 15
2019	Fourteenth Assembly	Bharatiya Janata Party	Manohar Lal Khattar	Total: 90. BJP: 40, INC: 31, JJP: 10, Others: 9
2024	Fifteenth Assembly	Bharatiya Janata Party	Nayab Singh Saini	Total: 90. BJP: 48, INC: 37, INLD:2, Others: 3

== Members of the Legislative Assembly ==
District	No	Constituency Name	Name	Political Party	Political Group
Panchkula	1	Kalka	Shakti Rani Sharma	BJP	NDA
Panchkula	2	Panchkula	Chander Mohan	INC	INDIA
Ambala	3	Naraingarh	Shalley Chaudhary	INC	INDIA
Ambala	4	Ambala Cantt	Anil Vij	BJP	NDA
Ambala	5	Ambala City	Nirmal Singh	INC	INDIA
Ambala	6	Mulana (SC)	Pooja Chaudhary	INC	INDIA
Yamunanagar	7	Sadhaura (SC)	Renu Bala	INC	INDIA
Yamunanagar	8	Jagadhri	Akram Khan	INC	INDIA
Yamunanagar	9	Yamunanagar	Ghanshyam Dass	BJP	NDA
Yamunanagar	10	Radaur	Shyam Singh Rana	BJP	NDA
Kurukshetra	11	Ladwa	Nayab Singh Saini	BJP	NDA
Kurukshetra	12	Shahbad (SC)	Ram Karan	INC	INDIA
Kurukshetra	13	Thanesar	Ashok Kumar Arora	INC	INDIA
Kurukshetra	14	Pehowa	Mandeep Chatha	INC	INDIA
Kaithal	15	Guhla (SC)	Devender Hans	INC	INDIA
Kaithal	16	Kalayat	Vikas Saharan	INC	INDIA
Kaithal	17	Kaithal	Aditya Surjewala	INC	INDIA
Kaithal	18	Pundri	Satpal Jamba	BJP	NDA
Karnal	19	Nilokheri (SC)	Bhagwan Das	BJP	NDA
Karnal	20	Indri	Ram Kumar Kashyap	BJP	NDA
Karnal	21	Karnal	Jagmohan Anand	BJP	NDA
Karnal	22	Gharaunda	Harvinder Kalyan (Speaker)	BJP	NDA
Karnal	23	Assandh	Yogender Singh Rana	BJP	NDA
Panipat	24	Panipat Rural	Mahipal Dhanda	BJP	NDA
Panipat	25	Panipat City	Parmod Kumar Vij	BJP	NDA
Panipat	26	Israna (SC)	Krishan Lal Panwar	BJP	NDA
Panipat	27	Samalkha	Manmohan Bhadana	BJP	NDA
Sonipat	28	Ganaur	Devender Kadyan	Independent	
Sonipat	29	Rai	Krishna Gahlawat	BJP	NDA
Sonipat	30	Kharkhauda (SC)	Pawan Kharkhauda	BJP	NDA
Sonipat	31	Sonipat	Nikhil Madan	BJP	NDA
Sonipat	32	Gohana	Arvind Kumar Sharma	BJP	NDA
Sonipat	33	Baroda	Indu Raj Narwal	INC	INDIA
Jind	34	Julana	Vinesh Phogat	INC	INDIA
Jind	35	Safidon	Ram Kumar Gautam	BJP	NDA
Jind	36	Jind	Krishan Lal Middha (Deputy Speaker)	BJP	NDA
Jind	37	Uchana Kalan	Devender Attri	BJP	NDA
Jind	38	Narwana (SC)	Krishan Kumar	BJP	NDA
Fatehabad	39	Tohana	Paramvir Singh	INC	INDIA
Fatehabad	40	Fatehabad	Balwan Singh Daulatpuria	INC	INDIA
Fatehabad	41	Ratia (SC)	Jarnail Singh	INC	INDIA
Sirsa	42	Kalanwali (SC)	Shishpal Singh	INC	INDIA
Sirsa	43	Dabwali	Aditya Devilal	Indian National Lok Dal	INLD+
Sirsa	44	Rania	Arjun Chautala	Indian National Lok Dal	INLD+
Sirsa	45	Sirsa	Gokul Setia	INC	INDIA
Sirsa	46	Ellenabad	Bharat Singh Beniwal	INC	INDIA
Hisar	47	Adampur	Chander Prakash Jangra	INC	INDIA
Hisar	48	Uklana (SC)	Naresh Selwal	INC	INDIA
Hisar	49	Narnaund	Jassi Petwar	INC	INDIA
Hisar	50	Hansi	Vinod Bhayana	BJP	NDA
Hisar	51	Barwala	Ranbir Singh Gangwa	BJP	NDA
Hisar	52	Hisar	Savitri Jindal	Independent	
Hisar	53	Nalwa	Randhir Parihar	BJP	NDA
Bhiwani	54	Loharu	Rajbir Singh Fartiya	INC	INDIA
Charkhi Dadri	55	Badhra	Umed Singh	BJP	NDA
Charkhi Dadri	56	Dadri	Sunil Satpal Sangwan	BJP	NDA
Bhiwani	57	Bhiwani	Ghanshyam Saraf	BJP	NDA
Bhiwani	58	Tosham	Shruti Choudhry	BJP	NDA
Bhiwani	59	Bawani Khera (SC)	Kapoor Valmiki	BJP	NDA
Rohtak	60	Meham	Balram Dangi	INC	INDIA
Rohtak	61	Garhi Sampla-Kiloi	Bhupinder Singh Hooda	INC	INDIA
Rohtak	62	Rohtak	Bharat Bhushan Batra	INC	INDIA
Rohtak	63	Kalanaur (SC)	Shakuntla Khatak	INC	INDIA
Jhajjar	64	Bahadurgarh	Rajesh Joon	Independent	
Jhajjar	65	Badli	Kuldeep Vats	INC	INDIA
Jhajjar	66	Jhajjar (SC)	Geeta Bhukkal	INC	INDIA
Jhajjar	67	Beri	Raghuvir Singh Kadian	INC	INDIA
Mahendragarh	68	Ateli	Arti Singh Rao	BJP	NDA
Mahendragarh	69	Mahendragarh	Kanwar Singh Yadav	BJP	NDA
Mahendragarh	70	Narnaul	Om Parkash Yadav	BJP	NDA
Mahendragarh	71	Nangal Chaudhry	Manju Chaudhary	INC	INDIA
Rewari	72	Bawal (SC)	Krishan Kumar	BJP	NDA
Rewari	73	Kosli	Anil Yadav	BJP	NDA
Rewari	74	Rewari	Laxman Singh Yadav	BJP	NDA
Gurgaon	75	Pataudi (SC)	Bimla Chaudhary	BJP	NDA
Gurgaon	76	Badshahpur	Rao Narbir Singh	BJP	NDA
Gurgaon	77	Gurgaon	Mukesh Sharma	BJP	NDA
Gurgaon	78	Sohna	Tejpal Tanwar	BJP	NDA
Nuh	79	Nuh	Aftab Ahmed	INC	INDIA
Nuh	80	Ferozepur Jhirka	Mamman Khan	INC	INDIA
Nuh	81	Punahana	Mohammad Ilyas	INC	INDIA
Palwal	82	Hathin	Mohd Israil	INC	INDIA
Palwal	83	Hodal (SC)	Harinder Singh	BJP	NDA
Palwal	84	Palwal	Gaurav Gautam	BJP	NDA
Faridabad	85	Prithla	Raghubir Tewatia	INC	INDIA
Faridabad	86	Faridabad NIT	Satish Kumar Phagna	BJP	NDA
Faridabad	87	Badkhal	Dhanesh Adlakha	BJP	NDA
Faridabad	88	Ballabgarh	Mool Chand Sharma	BJP	NDA
Faridabad	89	Faridabad	Vipul Goel	BJP	NDA
Faridabad	90	Tigaon	Rajesh Nagar	BJP	NDA

== See also ==
- Aaya Ram Gaya Ram
- Dynastic politics of Haryana
- Elections in Haryana
