= List of Rajya Sabha members from Haryana =

The list of current and past Rajya Sabha members from the Haryana State. State elect 5 member for the term of 6 years and indirectly elected by the state legislators, since year 1966.

== Chronological list of all Rajya Sabha members from Haryana state ==
Chronological list by last date of appointment

- * represents current members

Name	Party	Term start	Term end	Term	Notes
Sanjay Bhatia	BJP	10-Apr-2026	09-Apr-2032	1	
Karamvir Singh Boudh	INC	10-Apr-2026	09-Apr-2032	1	
Kiran Choudhry	BJP	28-Aug-2024	09-Apr-2026	1	bye - resignation of Deepender Singh Hooda
Subhash Barala	BJP	03-Apr-2024	02-Apr-2030	1	
Rekha Sharma	BJP	13-Dec-2024	01-Aug-2028	1	bye - resignation of Krishan Lal Panwar
Kartikeya Sharma	IND	02-Aug-2022	01-Aug-2028	1	
Krishan Lal Panwar	BJP	02-Aug-2022	08-Oct-2024	1	elected to Israna Assembly constituency
Ram Chander Jangra	BJP	10-Apr-2020	09-Apr-2026	1	
Deepender Singh Hooda	INC	10-Apr-2020	04-Jun-2024	1	elected to Rohtak Lok Sabha constituency
Dushyant Kumar Gautam	BJP	19-Mar-2020	01-Aug-2022	1	bye - res of Birender Singh
D. P. Vats	BJP	03-Apr-2018	02-Apr-2024	1	
Birender Singh	BJP	02-Aug-2016	20-Jan-2020	3	resigned
Subhash Chandra	Ind	02-Aug-2016	01-Aug-2022	1	
Suresh Prabhu	BJP	29-Nov-2014	01-Aug-2016	1	bye - res of Ranbir Singh Gangwa
Birender Singh	BJP	29-Nov-2014	01-Aug-2016	2	bye - res of Chaudhary Birender Singh
Selja Kumari	INC	10-Apr-2014	09-Apr-2020	1	
Ram Kumar Kashyap	INLD	10-Apr-2014	24-Oct-2019	1	elected to Indri Assembly
Shadi Lal Batra	INC	03-Apr-2012	02-Apr-2018	2	
Birender Singh	INC	02-Aug-2010	28-Aug-2014	1	resigned
Ranbir Singh Gangwa	INLD	02-Aug-2010	01-Nov-2014	1	elected to Nalwa Assembly
Shadi Lal Batra	INC	04-Aug-2009	02-Apr-2012	1	bye - res of H. R. Bhardwaj
Ram Prakash	INC	10-Apr-2008	09-Apr-2014	2	
Ishwar Singh	INC	10-Apr-2008	04-Mar-2014	1	resigned
Ram Prakash	INC	23-Mar-2007	09-Apr-2008	1	bye - death of Sumitra Mahajan
H. R. Bhardwaj	INC	03-Apr-2006	24-Jun-2009	1	appointed as Governor of Karnataka
Ajay Singh Chautala	INLD	02-Aug-2004	03-Nov-2009	1	elected to Dabwali Assembly
Tarlochan Singh	Ind	02-Aug-2004	01-Aug-2010	1	
Sumitra Mahajan	INLD	10-Apr-2002	19-Jan-2007	1	expired
Harendra Singh Malik	INLD	10-Apr-2002	09-Apr-2008	1	
Man Singh Rao	INLD	06-Jun-2001	01-Aug-2004	1	bye - death of Devi Lal
Fakir Chand Mullana	INLD	03-Apr-2000	02-Apr-2006	1	
Swaraj Kaushal	HVP	02-Aug-1998	01-Aug-2004	1	
Devi Lal	INLD	02-Aug-1998	06-Apr-2001	1	expired
K. L. Poswal	INC	13-Feb-1996	01-Aug-1998	1	bye - death of Dinesh Singh
Banarsi Das Gupta	INC	10-Apr-1996	09-Apr-2002	1	
Lachman Singh	INC	10-Apr-1996	09-Apr-2002	1	
Ramji Lal	INC	03-Apr-1994	02-Apr-2000	2	
Dinesh Singh	INC	06-Jul-1993	30-Nov-1995	1	bye - res of Ramji Lal expired
Ramji Lal	INC	02-Aug-1992	17-May-1993	1	resigned
Shamsher Singh Surjewala	INC	02-Aug-1992	01-Aug-1998	1	
Ranjit Singh Chautala	JD	12-Sep-1990	01-Aug-1992	1	bye - res of Krishna Kumar Deepak
Krishna Kumar Deepak	JD	23-Mar-1990	13-Jul-1990	1	bye - res of Bhajan Lal resigned
Vidya Beniwal	JD	10-Apr-1990	09-Apr-1996	1	
Sushma Swaraj	BJP	10-Apr-1990	09-Apr-1996	1	
Mohinder Singh Lather	JD	03-Apr-1988	02-Apr-1994	1	
Om Prakash Chautala	JD	14-Aug-1987	09-Apr-1990	1	bye - death of M. P. Kaushik
Bhajan Lal	INC	02-Aug-1986	27-Nov-1989	1	elected to Faridabad Lok Sabha
Surender Singh	INC	02-Aug-1986	01-Aug-1992	1	
M. P. Kaushik	INC	10-Apr-1984	21-May-1987	1	expired
Mukhtiar Singh Malik	INC	10-Apr-1984	09-Apr-1990	2	
Chand Ram	INC	12-Mar-1983	09-Apr-1984	1	bye - res of Sujan Singh
Hari Singh Nalwa	INC	03-Apr-1982	02-Apr-1988	1	
Hari Singh Nalwa	INC	19-Mar-1980	02-Apr-1982	1	
Sushil Chand Mohuta	LKD	02-Aug-1980	01-Aug-1986	1	
Sultan Singh	INC	02-Aug-1980	01-Aug-1986	3	
Sarup Singh	LKD	10-Apr-1978	09-Apr-1984	1	
Sujan Singh	JP	10-Apr-1978	31-Dec-1982	2	resigned
Sujan Singh	JP	13-Mar-1977	09-Apr-1978	1	bye - res of Krishan Kant
Parbhu Singh	INC	02-Aug-1974	01-Aug-1980	1	
Sultan Singh	INC	02-Aug-1974	01-Aug-1980	2	
Ranbir Singh Hooda	INC	10-Apr-1972	09-Apr-1978	1	
Krishan Kant	INC	10-Apr-1972	20-Mar-1977	2	elected to Chandigarh Lok Sabha
Sultan Singh	INC	31-Mar-1970	01-Aug-1974	1	bye - res of Rizak Ram Dahiya
Dev Dutt Puri	INC	03-Apr-1970	02-Apr-1976	1	
Rizak Ram Dahiya	INC	02-Aug-1968	03-Feb-1970	1	resigned
B. D. Sharma	INC	02-Aug-1968	01-Aug-1974	1	
Mukhtiar Singh Malik	INC	06-Apr-1967	02-Apr-1968	1	bye -
Ram Chander	INC	29-Nov-1966	02-Apr-1968	1	
Krishan Kant	INC	29-Nov-1966	02-Apr-1972	1	
Lala Jagat Narain	BKD	03-Apr-1964	02-Apr-1970	1	
