= Rohtak Lok Sabha constituency =

Lok Sabha Constituency in Haryana, India

Coordinates: 28.9°N 76.6°E

Rohtak HR-7
- Lok Sabha constituency
- Lok Sabha constituencies in Haryana, Rohtak is numbered 7

Constituency details
- Country: India
- Region: North India
- State: Haryana
- Assembly constituencies: Meham; Garhi Sampla-Kiloi; Rohtak; Kalanaur; Bahadurgarh; Badli; Jhajjar; Beri; Kosli
- Established: 1952
- Reservation: None

Member of Parliament
- 18th Lok Sabha
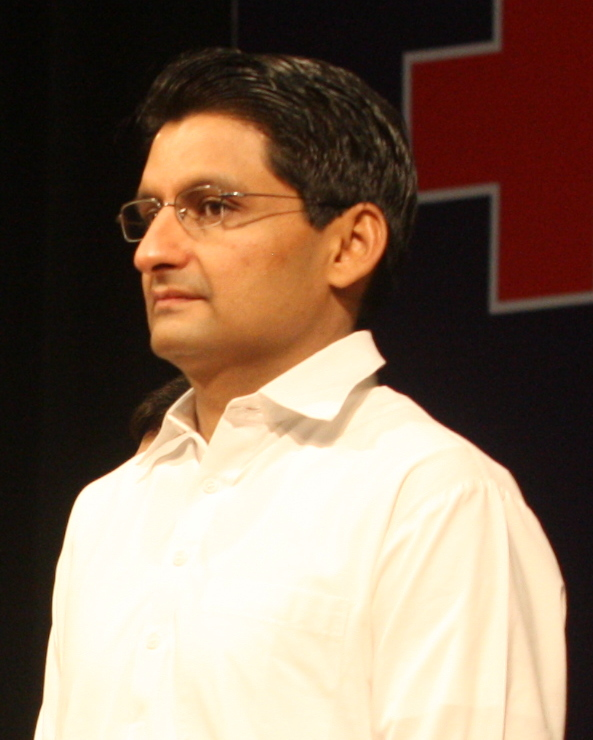
- Incumbent Deepender Singh Hooda
- Party: INC
- Alliance: INDIA
- Elected year: 2024

Rohtak Lok Sabha constituency is one of the 10 Lok Sabha (parliamentary) constituencies in the Indian state of Haryana. This constituency covers the entire Rohtak and Jhajjar districts and part of Rewari district.

Members of Parliament from Rohtak Lok Sabha Constituency
1. Indian National Congress (13 Times) (61.9%)
2. Janata Party (2 Times) (9.52%)
3. Bharatiya Jana Sangh (2 Times) (9.52%)
4. Lokdal (1 Time) (4.76%)
5. Janata Dal (1 Time) (4.76%)
6. Bharatiya Janata Party (1 Time) (4.70%)
7. Indian National Lok Dal (1 Time) (4.76%)

== Assembly segments ==
At present, Rohtak Lok Sabha constituency comprises nine Vidhan Sabha (legislative assembly) constituencies. These are:

| # | Name | District | Member | Party | Leading (in 2024) |
|---|---|---|---|---|---|
| 60 | Meham | Rohtak | Balram Dangi | INC | INC |
| 61 | Garhi Sampla-Kiloi | Rohtak | Bhupinder Singh Hooda | INC | INC |
| 62 | Rohtak | Rohtak | Bharat Bhushan Batra | INC | INC |
| 63 | Kalanaur (SC) | Rohtak | Shakuntala Khatak | INC | INC |
| 64 | Bahadurgarh | Jhajjar | Rajesh Joon | IND | INC |
| 65 | Badli | Jhajjar | Kuldeep Vats | INC | INC |
| 66 | Jhajjar (SC) | Jhajjar | Geeta Bhukkal | INC | INC |
| 67 | Beri | Jhajjar | Raghuvir Singh Kadian | INC | INC |
| 73 | Kosli | Rewari | Anil Yadav | BJP | INC |

== Members of Parliament ==
| Year | Member | Party |
|---|---|---|
| 1952 | Ch. Ranbir Singh Hooda | Indian National Congress |
| 1957 | Ch. Ranbir Singh Hooda | Indian National Congress |
| 1962 | Ch. Ramandeep | Bharatiya Jana Sangh |
| 1967 | Chaudhary Randhir Singh | Indian National Congress |
| 1971 | Ch. Mukhtiar Singh Malik | Bharatiya Jana Sangh |
| 1977 | Prof. Sher Singh Kadyan | Janata Party |
| 1980 | Swami Indrevesh | Janata Party (Secular) |
| 1984 | Ch. Hardwari Lal Dalal | Indian National Congress |
| 1987^ | Ch. Hardwari Lal Dalal | Lokdal |
| 1989 | Ch. Devi Lal | Janata Dal |
| 1991 | Ch. Bhupinder Singh Hooda | Indian National Congress |
| 1996 | Ch. Bhupinder Singh Hooda | Indian National Congress |
| 1998 | Ch. Bhupinder Singh Hooda | Indian National Congress |
| 1999 | Capt. Inder Singh | Indian National Lok Dal |
| 2004 | Ch. Bhupinder Singh Hooda | Indian National Congress |
| 2005^ | Deepender Singh Hooda | Indian National Congress |
| 2009 | Deepender Singh Hooda | Indian National Congress |
| 2014 | Deepender Singh Hooda | Indian National Congress |
| 2019 | Arvind Sharma | Bharatiya Janata Party |
| 2024 | Deepender Singh Hooda | Indian National Congress |

^ denotes by-polls

== Election results ==
=== 2024 ===
2024 Indian general election: Rohtak
| Party | Candidate | Votes | % | ±% |
|---|---|---|---|---|
| INC | Deepender Singh Hooda | 783,578 | 62.76 | ▲16.36 |
| BJP | Arvind Kumar Sharma | 438,280 | 35.11 | ▼11.19 |
| NOTA | None of the above | 2,362 | 0.19 | ▼0.06 |
| Majority | | 345,298 | 27.65 | ▲27.04 |
| Turnout | | 1,254,043 | 65.53 | ▼4.99 |
| INC gain from BJP | | Swing | | |

=== 2019 ===
2019 Indian general elections: Rohtak
| Party | Candidate | Votes | % | ±% |
|---|---|---|---|---|
| BJP | Arvind Kumar Sharma | 573,845 | 47.01 | ▲16.46 |
| INC | Deepender Singh Hooda | 566,342 | 46.40 | ▼0.46 |
| JJP | Pradeep Deswal | 21,211 | 1.74 | New |
| NOTA | None of the Above | 3001 | 0.25 | ▼0.22 |
| Majority | | 7,503 | 0.61 | ▼15.73 |
| Turnout | | 1,224,994 | 70.52 | ▲3.81 |
| BJP gain from INC | | Swing | | |

=== 2014 ===
2014 Indian general elections: Rohtak
| Party | Candidate | Votes | % | ±% |
|---|---|---|---|---|
| INC | Deepender Singh Hooda | 490,063 | 46.86 | ▼23.12 |
| BJP | Om Prakash Dhankar | 3,19,436 | 30.55 | ▲30.55 |
| INLD | Shamsher Singh Kharkara | 1,51,120 | 14.45 | ▼2.21 |
| AAP | Naveen Jaihind | 46,759 | 4.47 | ▲4.47 |
| NOTA | None of the Above | 4,932 | 0.47 | ▲0.47 |
| Majority | | 1,70,627 | 16.34 | ▼36.98 |
| Turnout | | 10,45,723 | 66.71 | ▲1.15 |
| INC hold | | Swing | ▼23.05 | |

=== 2009 ===
2009 Indian general elections: Rohtak
| Party | Candidate | Votes | % | ±% |
|---|---|---|---|---|
| INC | Deepender Singh Hooda | 585,016 | 69.98 | |
| INLD | Nafe Singh Rathee | 1,39,280 | 16.66 | |
| BSP | Raj Kumar | 68,210 | 8.16 | |
| HJC(BL) | Krishan Murti | 20,472 | 2.45 | |
| Independent | Satyawan Ranga | 6,876 | 0.82 | |
| Majority | | 4,45,736 | 53.32 | |
| Turnout | | 8,35,930 | 65.56 | |
| INC hold | | Swing | | |

=== 2004 ===
2004 Indian general election: Rohtak
| Party | Candidate | Votes | % | ±% |
|---|---|---|---|---|
| INC | Bhupinder Singh | 324,235 | 48.97 | |
| BJP | Abhimanyu | 1,73,800 | 26.25 | |
| INLD | Bhim Singh | 1,05,640 | 15.96 | |
| BSP | Geeta | 24,228 | 3.66 | |
| Others | 7 Other Candidates | 17,535 | 2.65 | |
| Independent | 13 Independent Candidates | 16,611 | 2.51 | |
| Majority | | 1,50,435 | 22.72 | |
| Turnout | | | | |
| Swing to INC from INLD | | Swing | | |

=== 1999 ===
1999 Indian general election: Rohtak
| Party | Candidate | Votes | % | ±% |
|---|---|---|---|---|
| INLD | Inder Singh | 366,926 | 57.93 | |
| INC | Bhupinder Singh | 2,22,233 | 35.09 | |
| Independent | Arvind Kumar Sharma | 27,265 | 4.30 | |
| SP | Kanta | 5,295 | 0.84 | |
| Independent | 10 Independent Candidates | 11,654 | 1.84 | |
| Majority | | 1,44,693 | 22.84 | |
| Turnout | | | | |
| Swing to INLD from INC | | Swing | | |

=== 1998 ===
1998 Indian general election: Rohtak
| Party | Candidate | Votes | % | ±% |
|---|---|---|---|---|
| INC | Bhupinder Singh | 254,951 | 38.66 | |
| INLD | Devi Lal | 2,54,568 | 38.61 | |
| BJP | Swami Indervesh | 1,30,895 | 19.85 | |
| SP | Kaptan Singh Rathee | 2,717 | 0.41 | |
| JP | Umed Singh | 1,071 | 0.16 | |
| Independent | 13 Independent Candidates | 15,212 | 2.31 | |
| Majority | | 383 | 0.05 | |
| Turnout | | | | |
| INC hold | | Swing | | |

=== 1996 ===
1996 Indian general election: Rohtak
| Party | Candidate | Votes | % | ±% |
|---|---|---|---|---|
| INC | Bhupender | 198,154 | 31.71 | |
| SAP | Devi Lal | 1,95,490 | 31.28 | |
| BJP | Pardeep Kumar | 1,58,376 | 25.34 | |
| JP | Raj Singh | 2,751 | 0.44 | |
| SS | Narinder Singh | 2,079 | 0.33 | |
| JD | Laxman Singh | 1,505 | 0.24 | |
| Others | 4 Other Party Candidates | 11,166 | 1.78 | |
| Independent | 24 Independent Candidates | 55,389 | 8.85 | |
| Majority | | 2,664 | 0.43 | |
| Turnout | | | | |
| INC hold | | Swing | | |

=== 1991 ===
1991 Indian general election: Rohtak
| Party | Candidate | Votes | % | ±% |
|---|---|---|---|---|
| INC | Bhupender Singh | 241,235 | 44.00 | |
| JP | Devi Lal | 2,10,662 | 38.43 | |
| HVP | Inder Singh | 43,804 | 7.99 | |
| BJP | Raj Kumar | 23,802 | 4.34 | |
| Others | 2 Other Candidates | 2,507 | 0.46 | |
| Independent | 20 Independent Candidates | 26,213 | 4.77 | |
| Majority | | 30,573 | 5.57 | |
| Turnout | | | | |
| Swing to INC from JP | | Swing | | |

=== 1989 ===
1989 Indian general election: Rohtak
| Party | Candidate | Votes | % | ±% |
|---|---|---|---|---|
| JD | Devi Lal | 390,243 | 64.21 | |
| INC | Hardwari Lal | 2,01,238 | 33.11 | |
| JP | Mohinder Singh | 2,047 | 0.34 | |
| BSP | Zile Singh | 1,998 | 0.33 | |
| Doordarshi Party | Balbir Singh | 692 | 0.11 | |
| Independent | 19 Independent Candidates | 11,545 | 1.91 | |
| Majority | | 1,89,005 | 31.10 | |
| Turnout | | | | |
| Swing to JD from INC | | Swing | | |

=== 1984 ===
1984 Indian general election: Rohtak
| Party | Candidate | Votes | % | ±% |
|---|---|---|---|---|
| INC | Hardwari Lal | 216,294 | 49.27 | |
| LKD | Sarup Singh | 1,85,363 | 42.22 | |
| BJP | Hukum Chand Goel | 22,207 | 5.06 | |
| Independent | 16 Independent Candidates | 15,173 | 3.45 | |
| Majority | | 30,931 | 7.05 | |
| Turnout | | | | |
| Swing to INC from LKD | | Swing | | |

=== 1980 ===
1980 Indian general election: Rohtak
| Party | Candidate | Votes | % | ±% |
|---|---|---|---|---|
| JP(S) | Inder Vesh | 219,004 | 52.13 | |
| JP | Sher Singh | 97,564 | 23.22 | |
| INC(I) | Chand Ram | 78,396 | 18.66 | |
| Independent | 14 Independent Candidates | 25,176 | 5.99 | |
| Majority | | 1,21,440 | 28.91 | |
| Turnout | | | | |
| Swing to JP(S) from JP | | Swing | | |

=== 1977 ===
1977 Indian general election: Rohtak
| Party | Candidate | Votes | % | ±% |
|---|---|---|---|---|
| JP | Sher Singh | 320,550 | 81.59 | |
| INC | Munphool Singh | 60,905 | 15.50 | |
| Independent | Attar Singh | 5,440 | 1.38 | |
| SUCI | Balwant | 3,497 | 0.89 | |
| Independent | Chander Bhan | 2,479 | 0.63 | |
| Majority | | 2,59,645 | 66.09 | |
| Turnout | | 3,98,627 | 68.97 | |
| Swing to JP from INC | | Swing | | |

=== 1971 ===
1971 Indian general election: Rohtak
| Party | Candidate | Votes | % | ±% |
|---|---|---|---|---|
| ABJS | Mukhtiar Singh | 143,409 | 44.46 | |
| INC | Randhir Singh | 1,38,738 | 43.01 | |
| Independent | Bharat Singh | 16,550 | 5.13 | |
| Independent | Munshi Ram | 11,315 | 3.51 | |
| Independent | Bhim Singh | 5,771 | 1.79 | |
| Independent | Balwan | 3,692 | 1.14 | |
| SUCI | Ran Singh | 1,592 | 0.49 | |
| Independent | Panna | 1,470 | 0.46 | |
| Majority | | 4,671 | 1.45 | |
| Turnout | | 3,29,327 | 64.04 | |
| Swing to ABJS from INC | | Swing | | |

=== 1967 ===
1967 Indian general election: Rohtak
| Party | Candidate | Votes | % | ±% |
|---|---|---|---|---|
| INC | R. Singh | 176,258 | 50.26 | |
| ABJS | R. Sarup | 1,20,662 | 34.41 | |
| Independent | B. Dass | 23,496 | 6.70 | |
| Independent | S. R. Sharma | 8,722 | 2.49 | |
| Independent | B. Singh | 7,026 | 2.00 | |
| SSP | P. Chand | 6,803 | 1.94 | |
| Independent | M. Ram | 6,255 | 1.78 | |
| Independent | J. Ram | 1,478 | 0.42 | |
| Majority | | 55,596 | 15.85 | |
| Turnout | | 3,62,943 | 75.98 | |
| Swing to INC from ABJS | | Swing | | |

=== 1962 ===
1962 Indian general election: Rohtak
| Party | Candidate | Votes | % | ±% |
|---|---|---|---|---|
| ABJS | Lehri Singh | 155,618 | 46.10 | ▲29.24 |
| INC | Randhir Singh | 1,35,511 | 40.14 | ▲1.89 |
| Independent | Lachhmi Narayan | 27,881 | 8.26 | |
| Independent | Phul Singh | 18,573 | 5.50 | |
| Majority | | 20,107 | 5.96 | |
| Turnout | | 3,48,401 | 72.98 | |
| Swing to ABJS from INC | | Swing | | |

=== 1957 ===
1957 Indian general election: Rohtak
| Party | Candidate | Votes | % | ±% |
|---|---|---|---|---|
| INC | Ranbir Singh | 104,690 | 38.25 | ▼4.46 |
| Independent | Dhaja Ram | 78,075 | 28.53 | N/A |
| ABJS | Ram Chand | 46,144 | 16.86 | New entry |
| RPI | Hari Ram | 29,203 | 10.67 | New entry |
| Independent | Piare Lal | 15,586 | 5.69 | N/A |
| Majority | | 26,615 | 9.72 | ▼0.69 |
| Turnout | | 2,73,698 | 69.45 | |
| INC hold | | Swing | | |

=== 1951 ===
1951 Indian general election: Rohtak
| Party | Candidate | Votes | % | ±% |
|---|---|---|---|---|
| INC | Ranbir Singh | 108,148 | 42.71 | New entry |
| Zamindar Party | Hari Ram | 81,776 | 32.30 | New entry |
| Independent | Suresh Chandra | 43,229 | 17.07 | N/A |
| Independent | Fateh Singh | 20,035 | 7.91 | N/A |
| Majority | | 26,372 | 10.41 | New entry |
| Turnout | | 2,53,188 | 69.64 | New entry |
| INC win (new seat) | | | | |

== See also ==
- Rohtak district
- List of constituencies of the Lok Sabha
