= Ranbir Singh Hooda =

Indian politician (1914–2009)

Chaudary Ranbir Singh Hooda
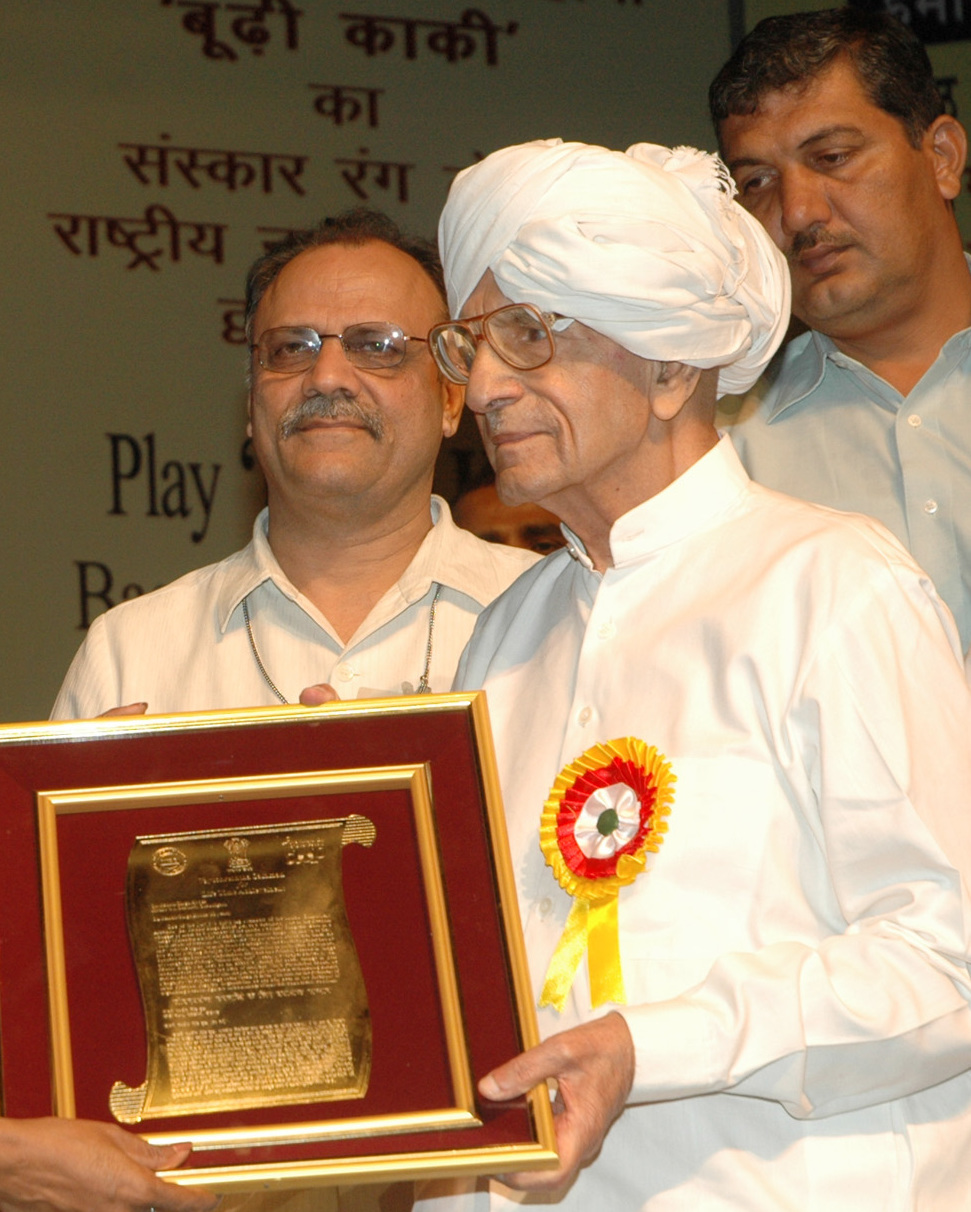

Member of Parliament, Rajya Sabha
- In office 10 April 1972 – 9 April 1978
- Constituency: Haryana

Member of the Haryana Legislative Assembly
- In office 1968–1972
- Preceded by: Shreyo Nath
- Succeeded by: Shreyo Nath
- Constituency: Kiloi, Haryana
- In office 1966–1967
- Preceded by: Himself as Punjab MLA
- Succeeded by: Nasib Singh
- Constituency: Kalanaur

Minister of Public Works Department, Haryana
- In office 1966–1967

Minister of Power and Irrigation, Punjab
- In office 1962–1966

Member of the Punjab Legislative Assembly
- In office 1962–1966
- Preceded by: Nahnu Ram
- Succeeded by: Himself as Haryana MLA
- Constituency: Kalanaur

Member of Parliament, Lok Sabha
- In office 1952–1962
- Preceded by: Office established
- Succeeded by: Lehri Singh
- Constituency: Rohtak, Punjab

Member of the Provisional Parliament
- In office 1950–1952
- Constituency: East Punjab

Member of the Constituent Assembly
- In office 1946–1950
- Constituency: Punjab (later East Punjab)

Personal details
- Born: 26 November 1914 Sanghi, Punjab, British India
- Died: 1 February 2009 (aged 94) Rohtak, Haryana, India
- Party: Indian National Congress
- Spouse: Hardei Hooda (??-2016)
- Children: Bhupinder Singh Hooda (son)
- Relatives: Deepender Singh Hooda (grandson) Ravinder singh Hooda (grandson)
- Education: Ramjas College
- Occupation: Agriculturist, politician

Ranbir Singh Hooda (26 November 1914 - 1 February 2009) was an Indian freedom fighter, parliamentarian and administrator from Haryana. He is known for taking up the cause of poor and backward people and peasants. He actively participated in the freedom struggle, and was jailed several times. He served as the Member of Parliament in Lok Sabha as well as Rajya Sabha. He holds a national record of having remained a member of seven different Houses and it is recorded in Limca book of Records.

He was a member of the Indian National Congress. The INC party sent him to the Constituent Assembly of India in July 1947, largely owing to his contribution to the freedom movement. He was instrumental in the framing of the Indian Constitution and primarily voiced concerns of workers, peasants, and lower-caste people. He was also a member of the Provisional Parliament and served it in 1950–52.

He served as a minister in undivided Punjab and then in the Haryana government. He was inducted into the council of ministers and held the portfolios of Power and Irrigation in 1962–66 and PWD and Health in 1966–67. He is also remembered for his contribution in the creation of the Bhakra Nangal Power Project. His 100th birth anniversary celebration was inaugurated by President Pranab Mukherjee on 27 November 2014.

== Early life and education ==
Hooda was born on 26 November 1914, in Sanghi, a village in Rohtak district of Undivided Punjab (now Haryana) into a Jat family. Hooda got his initial education at his village school and later at the Gurukul Bhainswal Kalan near Gohana ( Sonipat ) run by the Arya Samaj activist and social reformer, Bhagat Phool Singh.

After completing primary education, Hooda joined Vaish High School, Rohtak. He completed matriculation in 1933 and joined Government College, Rohtak for higher studies. He passed his FA examination in 1935. Later, he moved to Delhi and graduated from Ramjas College in 1937. He was conferred with an honorary degree of D.Litt. (Doctor of Letters) by Kurukshetra University in 2007.

== Career ==
=== Participation in freedom movement ===
Hooda joined the Gandhian army in the 1930s to contribute towards India's freedom struggle. Hooda was imprisoned on many occasions during the 1940s for his role in the independence movement.

He was first arrested in 1941 for participating in a Satyagraha movement. He was put behind the bars several times during India's freedom struggle. In all, he spent three and a half years in rigorous imprisonment and was under house arrest for two years. He was imprisoned in different jails in Rohtak, Ambala, Hisar, Ferozepur, Lahore (Borstal), Lahore (Central), Multan and Sialkot. He remained closely associated with Mahatma Gandhi during the latter's visits to Rohtak and nearby districts of Punjab.

=== Role in Constituent Assembly ===
The Indian National Congress sent him to the Constituent Assembly of India in July 1947, largely owing to his contribution to the freedom movement. He was instrumental in the framing of the Indian Constitution and primarily voiced concerns of workers, peasants, and lower-caste people. He was also a member of the Provisional Parliament and served it in 1950–52.

His Constituent Assembly speeches form part of a book, Making of our Constitution: Speeches of Ch. Ranbir Singh in the Constituent Assembly of India (2009), launched when his son was Haryana chief minister.

=== Political career ===
He contested the first Indian general election in 1952 from the Rohtak, Haryana and won the poll with a huge margin. In the second general elections in 1957, he again successfully contested from Rohtak, Haryana. In 1962, he was elected to the Punjab Legislative Assembly. He was inducted into the council of ministers and held the portfolios of Power and Irrigation in 1962–66 and PWD and Health in 1966–67. He is also remembered for his contribution in the creation of the Bhakra Nangal Power Project.

Upon the formation of Haryana as a new state on 1 November 1966, he shifted his political base to Haryana and became a minister. He won the Kiloi assembly seat in a by-election in 1968. He was elected to Rajya Sabha in 1972 and worked for the introduction of pension for former MPs. He remained the deputy leader of the Congress in Rajya Sabha in 1976–77. Hooda was the founder general secretary of Bharat Krishak Samaj and the All-India Backward Classes Federation. He remained the working president of the All-India Freedom Fighters Organisation till his demise.

== Legacy ==
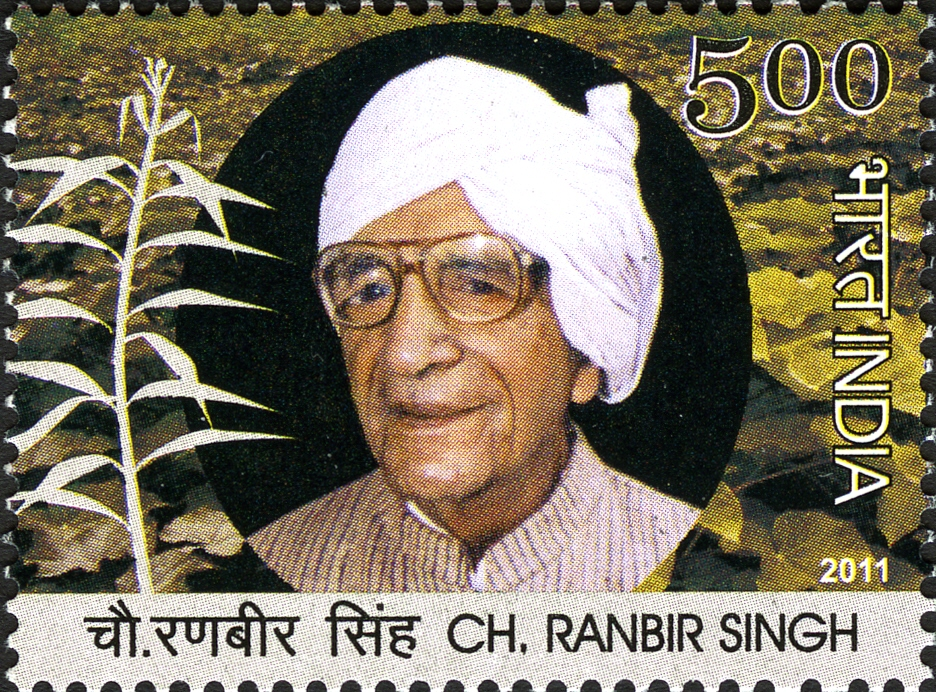
Ch. Ranbir Singh Hooda on postage stamp of India (2011)

Hooda had set a record for being a member of seven different houses in India's democratic history, a feat that has been registered and acknowledged by the Limca Book of Records.

On 1 February 2011, Government of India released a commemorative postage stamp in his remembrance.

== Death ==
Hooda died at the age of 94 on 1 February 2009. He was few of the surviving members of the Constituent Assembly of India during his death. He is survived by his sons Bhupinder Singh, Inder Singh and Dharmender Singh. Two of his sons, Pratap Singh and Joginder Singh, had died earlier. Hardei Hooda, his wife, died on 26 April 2015.
