= Ram Chander Jangra =

Indian politician (born 1950)

Member of Parliament, Rajya Sabha
- In office 10 April 2020 – 9 April 2026
- Succeeded by: Karamvir Singh Boudh
- Constituency: Haryana

Personal details
- Born: 8 May 1950 (age 75) Rohtak, Haryana, India
- Party: Bharatiya Janata Party
- Other political affiliations: Haryana Vikas Party (until 1996)
- Spouse: Kamlesh Devi (m. 1974)
- Children: 3
- Occupation: Agriculturist; businessman; politician

Ram Chander Jangra (born 8 May 1950) is an Indian politician and a member of the Bharatiya Janata Party (BJP). He was elected to the Rajya Sabha (the upper house of Indian Parliament) from Haryana in March 2020.

== Early life and background ==
Ram Chander Jangra was born around 1950 in Meham village, Rohtak district, Haryana. (Limited information is available about his early life, education, or family background.)

== Political career ==
Jangra began his political career with the Haryana Vikas Party, led by former Chief Minister of Haryana Bansi Lal. After the collapse of the Haryana Vikas Party government in 1996, he joined the Bharatiya Janata Party. In the 2014 Haryana Legislative Election, he contested from the Gohana constituency, securing 24.23% of the votes but finishing third.

In March 2020, Jangra was elected unopposed to the Rajya Sabha from Haryana, representing the BJP. He is considered a close associate of former Haryana Chief Minister and Union Power Minister Manohar Lal Khattar.

=== Pahalgam terror attack controversy ===
On May 24, 2025, during an event in Bhiwani, Haryana, commemorating the 300th birth anniversary of Ahilyabai Holkar, Jangra commented on the Pahalgam terror attack of April 22, 2025, which killed 26 civilians, including 25 Indian tourists and one Nepali national in Jammu and Kashmir. He stated that the women who lost their husbands in the attack "lacked the warrior spirit, enthusiasm, and zeal" and suggested they should have fought back against the terrorists, citing the bravery of historical figures like Ahilyabai Holkar. He further remarked that training under the Agniveer scheme could have reduced casualties.

The remarks triggered widespread backlash from opposition parties, including the Indian National Congress, All India Trinamool Congress, and Samajwadi Party. Congress leaders Jairam Ramesh and Deepender Singh Hooda condemned the statement as "insensitive" and demanded an apology from the Prime Minister and Jangra's expulsion from the BJP. The Trinamool Congress labeled the remarks "misogynistic," while Akhilesh Yadav of the Samajwadi Party called them "deeply offensive."
