= Kalanaur =

Kalanaur may refer to:

- Kalanaur, Gurdaspur, a town in the Indian state of Punjab
- Kalanaur, Haryana, a town in the Indian state of Haryana
  - Kalanaur Assembly constituency
