= Rohtak Assembly constituency =

Constituency of the Haryana legislative assembly in India

Coordinates: 28.89°N 76.61°E

Rohtak
- Constituency No. 62 for the Haryana Legislative Assembly

Constituency details
- Country: India
- Region: North India
- State: Haryana
- District: Rohtak
- Established: 1967
- Total electors: 1,98,237
- Reservation: None

Member of Legislative Assembly
- 15th Haryana Legislative Assembly
- Incumbent Bharat Bhushan Batra
- Party: Indian National Congress

Rohtak Assembly constituency is one of the 90 assembly constituencies of Haryana a northern state of India. Rohtak is also part of Rohtak Lok Sabha constituency.

Rohtak has 4 seats of legislative assembly

== Members of the Legislative Assembly ==
Year	Member	Party
1952	Dev Raj	Indian National Congress
1957	Mangal Sein	Bharatiya Jana Sangh
1962	Mangal Sein	Bharatiya Jana Sangh
1967	Mangal Sein	Bharatiya Jana Sangh
1968	Mangal Sein	Bharatiya Jana Sangh
1972	Kishan Dass	Indian National Congress
1977	Mangal Sein	Janata Party
1982	Mangal Sein	Bharatiya Janata Party
1985^	Kishan Dass	Indian National Congress
1987	Mangal Sein	Bharatiya Janata Party
1991	Subhash Chander	Indian National Congress
1996	Kishan Dass	Haryana Vikas Party
2000	Shadi Lal Batra	Indian National Congress
2005	Shadi Lal Batra	Indian National Congress
2009	Bharat Bhushan Batra	Indian National Congress
2014	Manish Grover	Bharatiya Janata Party
2019	Bharat Bhushan Batra	Indian National Congress
2024	Bharat Bhushan Batra	Indian National Congress

^By-Poll

== Election results ==
=== Assembly Election 2024 ===
2024 Haryana Legislative Assembly election: Rohtak
Party	Candidate	Votes	%	±%
INC	Bharat Bhushan Batra	59,419	49.25%	▲5.32
BJP	Manish Grover	58,078	48.14%	▲6.59
AAP	Bijender Hooda	1,188	0.98%	New
NOTA	None of the Above	569	0.47%	▼0.43
Margin of victory		1,341	1.11%	▼1.27
Turnout		1,20,648	60.40%	▲0.54
Registered electors		1,98,237		▲4.14
INC hold		Swing	▲5.32	

=== Assembly Election 2019 ===
2019 Haryana Legislative Assembly election: Rohtak
Party	Candidate	Votes	%	±%
INC	Bharat Bhushan Batra	50,437	43.93	▲3.13
BJP	Manish Grover	47,702	41.54	▼9.00
Independent	Mohit Dhanwantri	9,817	8.55	New
LSP	Ramchander Jangra	1,728	1.50	New
JJP	Rajesh Saini	1,672	1.46	New
BSP	Poonam	1,488	1.30	▲0.12
NOTA	None of the above	1,030	0.90	▲0.3
Margin of victory		2,735	2.38	▼7.37
Turnout		1,14,821	59.87	▼5.98
Registered electors		1,91,796		▲10.60
INC gain from BJP		Swing	▼6.62	

=== Assembly Election 2014 ===
2014 Haryana Legislative Assembly election: Rohtak
Party	Candidate	Votes	%	±%
BJP	Manish Grover	57,718	50.55	▲17.51
INC	Bharat Bhushan Batra	46,586	40.80	▼15.82
INLD	Raj Kumar Sharma	3,954	3.46	▼1.18
Independent	Surajmal Rose	2,287	2.00	New
BSP	Dr. Karan Vir Chamar	1,346	1.18	▼1.86
NOTA	None of the Above	686	0.60	New
Margin of victory		11,132	9.75	▼13.83
Turnout		1,14,185	65.85	▲3.67
Registered electors		1,73,412		▲29.73
BJP gain from INC		Swing	▼6.07	

=== Assembly Election 2009 ===
2009 Haryana Legislative Assembly election: Rohtak
Party	Candidate	Votes	%	±%
INC	Bharat Bhushan Batra	47,051	56.62%	▼10.25
BJP	Manish Grover	27,456	33.04%	▲9.85
INLD	Dharam Pal	3,855	4.64%	▼3.22
BSP	Balwan Singh	2,526	3.04%	▲1.64
HJC(BL)	Yoginder Nath	708	0.85%	New
Independent	Mahesh	439	0.53%	New
Margin of victory		19,595	23.58%	▼20.10
Turnout		83,105	62.17%	▲12.36
Registered electors		1,33,671		▼87.46
INC hold		Swing	▼10.25	

=== Assembly Election 2005 ===
2005 Haryana Legislative Assembly election: Rohtak
Party	Candidate	Votes	%	±%
INC	Shadi Lal Batra	45,445	51.25%	▲3.62
BJP	Manish Grover	34,969	39.43%	▼3.41
INLD	Sunder Lal Sethi	4,805	5.42%	New
Independent	Satyandra	2,928	0.55%	New
BSP	Ramesh Jangra	1,244	1.40%	▼1.7
LJP	Ramdhari Attkan	758	0.85%	New
Independent	Hardeep	499	0.56%	New
Margin of victory		10,476	11.8%	
Turnout		88,581	64.7%	
Registered electors		1,36,960		
INC hold		Swing	▲19.24	

=== Assembly Election 2000 ===
2000 Haryana Legislative Assembly election: Rohtak
Party	Candidate	Votes	%	±%
INC	Shadi Lal Batra	36,494	47.63%	▲20.21
BJP	Manish Grover	32,830	42.85%	New
Independent	Subhash Batra	3,111	4.06%	New
BSP	Satyawan	2,377	3.10%	New
Independent	Sureneder Kumar	629	0.82%	New
HVP	Satish Kumar	583	0.76%	▼64.09
Margin of victory		3,664	4.78%	▼32.65
Turnout		76,620	59.68%	▼9.37
Registered electors		1,28,468		▲1.11
INC gain from HVP		Swing	▼17.22	

=== Assembly Election 1996 ===
1996 Haryana Legislative Assembly election: Rohtak
Party	Candidate	Votes	%	±%
HVP	Kishan Das	56,863	64.85%	▲33.38
INC	Subhash Batra	24,045	27.42%	▼7.5
Independent	Gulshan Rai	1,903	2.17%	New
SAP	Satya Narain Dhanvantri	1,716	1.96%	New
Independent	Raj Kumar	634	0.72%	New
Independent	Naresh Kumar	444	0.51%	New
Margin of victory		32,818	37.43%	▲33.98
Turnout		87,685	70.69%	▲9.56
Registered electors		1,27,063		▼0.08
HVP gain from INC		Swing	▲29.93	

=== Assembly Election 1991 ===
1991 Haryana Legislative Assembly election: Rohtak
Party	Candidate	Votes	%	±%
INC	Subhash Chander	26,398	34.92%	▼11.66
HVP	Kishan Das	23,791	31.47%	New
BJP	Sunder Lal Sethi	18,436	24.39%	▼24.19
JP	Ram Kumar	4,415	5.84%	New
Independent	Sarvajeet Singh Sangwan	449	0.59%	New
Margin of victory		2,607	3.45%	▲1.45
Turnout		75,590	61.21%	▼6.23
Registered electors		1,27,160		▲13.74
INC gain from BJP		Swing	▼13.66	

=== Assembly Election 1987 ===
1987 Haryana Legislative Assembly election: Rohtak
Party	Candidate	Votes	%	±%
BJP	Mangal Sein	35,672	48.58%	New
INC	Kishan Das	34,204	46.58%	New
Independent	Krishan	964	1.31%	New
Independent	Hawa Singh	835	1.14%	New
Margin of victory		1,468	2.00%	
Turnout		73,429	66.84%	
Registered electors		1,11,799		
BJP gain from INC		Swing		

=== Assembly By-election 1985 ===
1985 Haryana Legislative Assembly by-election: Rohtak
Party	Candidate	Votes	%	±%
INC	Kishan Das	36,688		
BJP	Mangal Sein	31,882		
Independent	D. Raj	520		New
Independent	O. Prakash	432		New
Independent	P. Kumar	334		New
Margin of victory		4,806		
INC gain from BJP		Swing		

=== Assembly Election 1982 ===
1982 Haryana Legislative Assembly election: Rohtak
Party	Candidate	Votes	%	±%
BJP	Mangal Sein	19,749	31.52%	New
INC	Sat Ram Dass	19,369	30.91%	▼1.26
Independent	Hari Mohan	15,654	24.98%	New
Independent	Hawa Singh	3,859	6.16%	New
JP	Parmanand Tuli	1,192	1.90%	▼65.3
Independent	Raj Pal S/O Sultan Singh	1,096	1.75%	New
Margin of victory		380	0.61%	▼34.42
Turnout		62,660	72.07%	▲5.71
Registered electors		88,104		▲15.08
BJP gain from JP		Swing	▼35.68	

=== Assembly Election 1977 ===
1977 Haryana Legislative Assembly election: Rohtak
Party	Candidate	Votes	%	±%
JP	Mangal Sein	33,650	67.20%	New
INC	Kishan Das	16,109	32.17%	▼20.69
VHP	Devinder Kumar	314	0.63%	New
Margin of victory		17,541	35.03%	▲26.91
Turnout		50,073	65.96%	▼7.01
Registered electors		76,556		▲17.80
JP gain from INC		Swing		

=== Assembly Election 1972 ===
1972 Haryana Legislative Assembly election: Rohtak
Party	Candidate	Votes	%	±%
INC	Kishan Das	24,879	52.86%	▲4.89
ABJS	Mangal Sein	21,057	44.74%	▼3.41
Independent	Ved Parkash	762	1.62%	New
Independent	Balwan	261	0.55%	New
Independent	Gobind Lal	103	0.22%	New
Margin of victory		3,822	8.12%	▲7.94
Turnout		47,062	73.60%	▲12.99
Registered electors		64,990		▲6.07
INC gain from ABJS		Swing	▲4.71	

=== Assembly Election 1968 ===
1968 Haryana Legislative Assembly election: Rohtak
Party	Candidate	Votes	%	±%
ABJS	Mangal Sein	17,534	48.15%	▼7.24
INC	Dev Raj	17,468	47.97%	▲4.55
Independent	Madan Gopal	400	1.10%	New
BKD	Shri Ram	360	0.99%	New
RPI	Ram Sarup	287	0.79%	New
Independent	Radha Krishan Mooda	177	0.49%	New
Independent	Murari Lal	97	0.27%	New
Independent	Nathu Ram	90	0.25%	New
Margin of victory		66	0.18%	▼11.79
Turnout		36,413	60.29%	▼16.02
Registered electors		61,272		▲8.17
ABJS hold		Swing	▼7.24	

=== Assembly Election 1967 ===
1967 Haryana Legislative Assembly election: Rohtak
Party	Candidate	Votes	%	±%
ABJS	Mangal Sein	23,672	55.39%	New
INC	T. Chand	18,558	43.43%	New
Independent	B. Ram	232	0.54%	New
SSP	J. Parshad	126	0.29%	New
Margin of victory		5,114	11.97%	
Turnout		42,735	76.79%	
Registered electors		56,642		
ABJS win (new seat)				

== See also ==
- Rohtak
- List of constituencies of the Haryana Legislative Assembly
