= Jhajjar Assembly constituency =

Constituency of the Haryana legislative assembly in India

Coordinates: 28.61°N 76.66°E

- Constituency No. 66 for the Haryana Legislative Assembly

Constituency details
- Country: India
- Region: North India
- State: Haryana
- District: Jhajjar
- Lok Sabha constituency: Rohtak
- Established: 1952
- Total electors: 1,92,758
- Reservation: SC

Member of Legislative Assembly
- 15th Haryana Legislative Assembly
- Incumbent Geeta Bhukkal
- Party: Indian National Congress
- Elected year: 2024

Jhajjar is one of the 90 assembly constituencies of Haryana a northern state of India. It is also part of Rohtak Lok Sabha constituency. It was once a reserved seat for the General, but now for SC.

== Members of the Legislative Assembly ==
Year	Member	Party
1952	Chand Ram	Indian National Congress
1957	Sher Singh Kadyan	Indian National Congress
1967	Manphul Singh Chahar	Independent
1968	Mahant Ganga Sagar	Indian National Congress
1972	Manphul Singh Chahar	Indian National Congress (O)
1977	Mange Ram	Janata Party
1982	Banarasi Dass	Lokdal
1987	Medhavi Kirti	Independent
1991	Dariyav Khatik	Janata Party
1996	Ram Parkash Dahiya	Haryana Vikas Party
2000	Dariyav Khatik	Independent
2005	Hari Ram	Indian National Congress
2009	Geeta Bhukkal	Indian National Congress
2014	Geeta Bhukkal	Indian National Congress
2019	Geeta Bhukkal	Indian National Congress
2024	Geeta Bhukkal	Indian National Congress

== Election results ==
=== Assembly Election 2024 ===
2024 Haryana Legislative Assembly election: Jhajjar
Party	Candidate	Votes	%	±%
INC	Geeta Bhukkal	66,345	53.66%	▲11.86
BJP	Kaptan Birdhana	52,790	42.70%	▲14.39
JJP	Naseeb Sonu	1,836	1.48%	▼20.50
BSP	Dharambir Singh	816	0.66%	▼1.73
AAP	Mahinder Dahiya	738	0.60%	New
NOTA	None of the Above	449	0.36%	New
Margin of victory		13,555	10.96%	▼2.52
Turnout		1,23,641	65.07%	▲1.07
Registered electors		1,92,758		▲9.34
INC hold		Swing	▲11.86	

=== Assembly Election 2019 ===
2019 Haryana Legislative Assembly election: Jhajjar
Party	Candidate	Votes	%	±%
INC	Geeta Bhukkal	46,480	41.80%	▼6.44
BJP	Rakesh Kumar	31,481	28.31%	▲9.48
JJP	Naseeb Kumar	24,445	21.98%	New
LSP	Ajay Tanwar	4,116	3.70%	New
BSP	Ramdhan	2,653	2.39%	▲1.03
INLD	Jogender Singh	945	0.85%	▼22.58
Margin of victory		14,999	13.49%	▼11.32
Turnout		1,11,208	63.99%	▼3.75
Registered electors		1,73,787		▲9.85
INC hold		Swing	▼6.44	

=== Assembly Election 2014 ===
2014 Haryana Legislative Assembly election: Jhajjar
Party	Candidate	Votes	%	±%
INC	Geeta Bhukkal	51,697	48.24%	▼11.98
INLD	Sadhu Ram	25,113	23.43%	▼2.51
BJP	Dariyav Khatik	20,178	18.83%	▲15.69
Independent	Kaptan Birdhana	5,048	4.71%	New
BSP	Gopiram	1,452	1.35%	▼0.69
Independent	Vijay Kumar Punia	663	0.62%	New
HJC(BL)	Naresh Kumar	645	0.60%	▼4.54
Margin of victory		26,584	24.80%	▼9.48
Turnout		1,07,174	67.75%	▲8.31
Registered electors		1,58,202		▲16.02
INC hold		Swing	▼11.98	

=== Assembly Election 2009 ===
2009 Haryana Legislative Assembly election: Jhajjar
Party	Candidate	Votes	%	±%
INC	Geeta Bhukkal	48,806	60.22%	▲9.40
INLD	Kanta Devi	21,023	25.94%	▼8.39
HJC(BL)	Sachin Balmiki	4,165	5.14%	New
BJP	Azad Singh	2,539	3.13%	▼7.23
BSP	Kishore Kumar Rajora	1,660	2.05%	▲1.00
Independent	Surender Singh	1,615	1.99%	New
Independent	Rajal	446	0.55%	New
Margin of victory		27,783	34.28%	▲17.79
Turnout		81,046	59.44%	▼6.71
Registered electors		1,36,357		▲4.80
INC hold		Swing	▲9.40	

=== Assembly Election 2005 ===
2005 Haryana Legislative Assembly election: Jhajjar
Party	Candidate	Votes	%	±%
INC	Hari Ram	43,739	50.82%	▲29.08
INLD	Kanta Devi	29,545	34.33%	New
BJP	Ramesh Kumar	8,919	10.36%	▼5.14
SP	Ram Kishan	1,710	1.99%	▲1.33
BSP	Karambir	898	1.04%	▼0.43
Independent	Sunita	645	0.75%	New
Margin of victory		14,194	16.49%	▼0.28
Turnout		86,070	66.15%	▲9.91
Registered electors		1,30,117		▲12.46
INC gain from Independent		Swing	▲12.32	

=== Assembly Election 2000 ===
2000 Haryana Legislative Assembly election: Jhajjar
Party	Candidate	Votes	%	±%
Independent	Dariyav Khatik	25,052	38.50%	New
INC	Phul Chand	14,142	21.73%	▲3.56
HVP	Lal Chand	11,697	17.98%	▼14.78
BJP	Chand Ram	10,088	15.50%	New
Independent	Hari Ram	2,107	3.24%	New
BSP	Sant Lal	957	1.47%	New
SP	Umrao Singh	426	0.65%	New
Independent	Tulsi Ram	400	0.61%	New
Margin of victory		10,910	16.77%	▲7.05
Turnout		65,069	56.24%	▼2.61
Registered electors		1,15,705		▲0.15
Independent gain from HVP		Swing	▲5.75	

=== Assembly Election 1996 ===
1996 Haryana Legislative Assembly election: Jhajjar
Party	Candidate	Votes	%	±%
HVP	Ram Parkash Dahiya	22,266	32.75%	New
Janhit Morcha	Kirpa Ram	15,657	23.03%	New
SAP	Dariyav Khatik	15,327	22.55%	New
INC	Ramesh Kumar	12,356	18.18%	▼16.30
JP	Ram Kumar S/O Chander Singh	519	0.76%	▼37.05
Independent	Pyare Lal	512	0.75%	New
RPI	Kailash Chander	414	0.61%	New
Margin of victory		6,609	9.72%	▲6.38
Turnout		67,983	61.96%	▲5.00
Registered electors		1,15,534		▲5.45
HVP gain from JP		Swing	▼5.06	

=== Assembly Election 1991 ===
1991 Haryana Legislative Assembly election: Jhajjar
Party	Candidate	Votes	%	±%
JP	Dariyav Khatik	22,305	37.81%	New
INC	Banarasi Dass	20,335	34.47%	▲10.41
JD	Piare Lal	11,734	19.89%	New
Independent	Kailash Chander	1,858	3.15%	New
BJP	Om Parkash S/O Badlu Ram	1,136	1.93%	New
Independent	Parbhu Dayal	596	1.01%	New
Margin of victory		1,970	3.34%	▼21.12
Turnout		58,987	55.89%	▼2.06
Registered electors		1,09,564		▲12.08
JP gain from Independent		Swing	▼10.72	

=== Assembly Election 1987 ===
1987 Haryana Legislative Assembly election: Jhajjar
Party	Candidate	Votes	%	±%
Independent	Medhavi	26,518	48.53%	New
INC	Mage Ram	13,150	24.07%	▼10.60
LKD	Mir Singh	5,347	9.79%	▼43.83
Independent	Banarasi Dass	4,994	9.14%	New
VHP	Pyare Lal	2,644	4.84%	New
Independent	Chhotu Ram	692	1.27%	New
Independent	Dariyav Khatik	339	0.62%	New
Independent	Chander Pal	325	0.59%	New
Independent	Ram Sarup	277	0.51%	New
Margin of victory		13,368	24.46%	▲5.51
Turnout		54,643	58.67%	▲0.91
Registered electors		97,753		▲19.27
Independent gain from LKD		Swing	▼5.08	

=== Assembly Election 1982 ===
1982 Haryana Legislative Assembly election: Jhajjar
Party	Candidate	Votes	%	±%
LKD	Banarasi Dass	24,163	53.61%	New
INC	Mange Ram	15,622	34.66%	▲25.90
Independent	Ram Niwas	1,961	4.35%	New
JP	Ram Parshad Balmiki	1,208	2.68%	▼46.37
Independent	Paire Lal Kataria	929	2.06%	New
Independent	Mahabir Singh	510	1.13%	New
Independent	Phool Chand	341	0.76%	New
Margin of victory		8,541	18.95%	▼8.15
Turnout		45,070	55.85%	▲2.14
Registered electors		81,960		▲18.03
LKD gain from JP		Swing	▲4.56	

=== Assembly Election 1977 ===
1977 Haryana Legislative Assembly election: Jhajjar
Party	Candidate	Votes	%	±%
JP	Mange Ram	18,001	49.05%	New
VHP	Banarasi Dass	8,057	21.95%	New
Independent	Mir Singh	5,524	15.05%	New
INC	Phul Singh Katria	3,214	8.76%	▼40.97
Independent	Attar Singh	1,902	5.18%	New
Margin of victory		9,944	27.10%	▲26.54
Turnout		36,698	53.36%	▼13.04
Registered electors		69,442		▼4.40
JP gain from INC(O)		Swing	▼1.23	

=== Assembly Election 1972 ===
1972 Haryana Legislative Assembly election: Jhajjar
Party	Candidate	Votes	%	±%
INC(O)	Manphul Singh	24,060	50.28%	New
INC	Sure Der Singh	23,795	49.72%	▲14.26
Margin of victory		265	0.55%	▼4.37
Turnout		47,855	67.70%	▲9.83
Registered electors		72,635		
INC(O) gain from INC		Swing		

=== Assembly Election 1968 ===
1968 Haryana Legislative Assembly election: Jhajjar
Party	Candidate	Votes	%	±%
INC	Ganga Sagar	13,253	35.46%	▲12.49
SWA	Manphul Singh	11,414	30.54%	New
Independent	Chandan Singh	10,166	27.20%	New
VHP	Uday Singh	2,201	5.89%	New
Independent	Piru	341	0.91%	New
Margin of victory		1,839	4.92%	▼2.97
Turnout		37,375	57.11%	▼19.38
Registered electors		66,671		▲5.99
INC gain from Independent		Swing	▲3.80	

=== Assembly Election 1967 ===
1967 Haryana Legislative Assembly election: Jhajjar
Party	Candidate	Votes	%	±%
Independent	M. Singh	15,024	31.66%	New
Independent	Chandan Singh	11,279	23.77%	New
INC	S. Singh	10,902	22.97%	New
Independent	S. Singh	9,367	19.74%	New
Independent	Rameshwar	312	0.66%	New
Independent	R. Parshad	290	0.61%	New
Independent	Jhabar	280	0.59%	New
Margin of victory		3,745	7.89%	
Turnout		47,454	78.74%	
Registered electors		62,906		
Independent win (new seat)				

== See also ==
- Jhajjar
- List of constituencies of the Haryana Legislative Assembly
