= Bharat Bhushan Batra =

Indian politician

Member of the Haryana Legislative Assembly
- Incumbent
- Assumed office 24 October 2019
- Preceded by: Manish Grover
- Constituency: Rohtak
- In office 2009–2014
- Preceded by: Shadi Lal Batra
- Succeeded by: Manish Grover
- Constituency: Rohtak

Personal details
- Born: 4 May 1952 (age 73) Kalanaur, East Punjab (now Haryana), India
- Party: Indian National Congress
- Spouse: Neelam Batra
- Children: 1
- Education: BA; LLB (Delhi University, 1977)
- Profession: Advocate

Bharat Bhushan Batra (born 4 May 1952) is an Indian politician serving as the MLA from Rohtak in the Haryana Legislative Assembly since 2019. He held the post previously from 2009 to 2014, winning the seat in 2009. After a loss in 2014, Batra regained the seat in 2019, which he retained in 2024.

== Personal life ==
Batra was born on 4 May 1952 to Sat Ram Dass Batra in Kalanaur town of East Punjab which is now in Haryana. He completed his Bachelor of Arts degree at Kalanaur and later did L.L.B. in 1977 at Delhi University. He is married to Neelam Batra, with whom he has a son.

== Political career ==
Batra was first elected as the Member of Legislative Assembly from Rohtak Vidhan Sabha constituency in 2009, defeating Bharatiya Janata Party's Manish Grover by 19,595 votes and succeeding fellow Congress politician Shadi Lal Batra in the process. During his tenure, he was the chairman of Library Committee, Petition Committee and Subject Committee on Education, Technical Education, Vocation Education, Medical Education and Health Services.

In the 2014 Haryana Legislative Assembly election, Batra lost to Grover with 11,132 votes. But, regained his seat in 2019, defeating the latter with 19,595 votes. Batra was the chief whip of Indian National Congress in Haryana Vidhan Sabha from 2010 to 2014 and 2019 to present.

In the 2024 Haryana Legislative Assembly election, Batra again won from Rohtak, defeating rival Manish Grover by 1,341 votes.
