= Badli Assembly constituency =

Badli Assembly constituency may refer to

- Badli, Delhi Assembly constituency
- Badli, Haryana Assembly constituency
