= Jalalpur, Rohtak =

Jalalpur
- Village (Rohtak)
- Location in Haryana, India Jalalpur (India)
- Coordinates: 28.78°N 76.49°E
- Country: India
- State: Haryana

Languages
  - Official: Hindi
- Time zone: UTC+5:30 (IST)
- PIN: 124514
- Vehicle registration: HR
- Website: haryana.gov.in

Jalalpur is a village in Rohtak district of Haryana, India.
