= Karamvir Singh Boudh =

Indian politician

Member of Parliament, Rajya Sabha
- Incumbent
- Assumed office 10 April 2026
- Preceded by: Ram Chander Jangra
- Constituency: Haryana

Personal details
- Born: Rohtak District,Haryana,India
- Party: Indian National Congress
- Education: Postgraduate (M.A. in History)
- Occupation: Politician

Karamvir Singh Boudh is an Indian politician. He was elected to the Rajya Sabha, the upper house of Indian Parliament, from Haryana as a member of the Indian National Congress in March 2026.
