= Geeta Bhukkal =

Indian politician

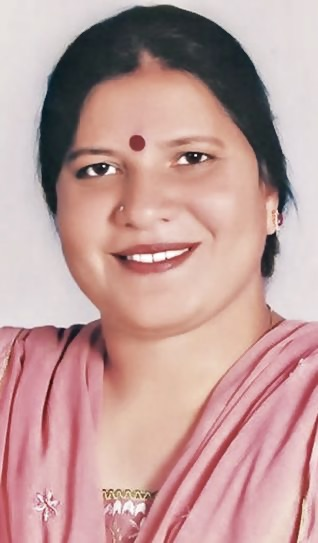

Member of the Haryana Legislative Assembly
- In office 2009–Incumbent
- Preceded by: Hari Ram
- Constituency: Jhajjar
- In office 2005–2009
- Preceded by: Deena Ram
- Succeeded by: Rampal Majra
- Constituency: Kalayat

Cabinet Minister Government of Haryana
- In office 2009–2014

Personal details
- Born: 16 August 1968 (age 58) Matanhail, Haryana, India
- Party: Indian National Congress
- Spouse: Dalbir Singh Bhukkal
- Children: Sukriti Bhukkal, Siddharth Bhukkal and Utkarsh
- Education: M.A., LL.B., P.G. Diploma in Personnel Management and Industrial Relations, B.Ed.

Geeta Bhukkal (born 16 August 1968) is an Indian National Congress politician representing the Jhajjar constituency in the Haryana Legislative Assembly, India. She is serving her fifth term as a Member of Legislative Assembly from the state of Haryana. She also held the portfolios of Education, Health, Women & Child Development, Social Justice & Empowerment, Welfare of SCs & BCs, Industrial Training and Printing & Stationery as a Minister in the Haryana Cabinet.

== Early life ==
After completing her B.A. from Panjab University, Chandigarh, she did her post-graduate diploma in personnel management and industrial relations from D.A.V Management College, Chandigarh. Bhukkal also completed her bachelor of law degree from the University of Delhi and her bachelor in education from Maharishi Dayanand University, Rohtak and after that she went for an M.A. in political science.

== Political career ==
Bhukkal is a five time Member of Legislative Assembly from the state of Haryana.

She was elected as a Member of Legislative Assembly for the first time from the Kalayat Assembly Segment in 2005. She won this seat for the Indian National Congress for the first time in 37 years.

Following delimitation before the 2009 Assembly elections, she contested from the Jhajjar Assembly Segment in 2009, winning the election with a margin of over 28,000 votes. She was made the Cabinet Minister for Education & Languages, Social Justice & Empowerment, Welfare of Scheduled Castes/Backward Classes, Women & Child Development, Industrial Training, Archaeology & Museums, Archives, Health & Medical Education, and Printing & Stationery.

She won the 2014 Assembly election from the Jhajjar Assembly Segment with a margin of over 26,000 votes becoming the first M.L.A. from Jhajjar to have won a consecutive term and she even became first Education Minister to have won an election.

She won the 2019 Assembly election from the Jhajjar Assembly Segment with a margin of over 15,000 votes becoming the first M.L.A. from Jhajjar to have won the seat three times in a row in the Jhajjar Assembly Segment and also creating a streak of wins in the State Assembly elections by winning for the fourth time in a row since 2005.

She won the 2024 Assembly election from the Jhajjar Assembly Segment with a margin of 13555 votes and also created a record by winning five consecutive assembly polls and she is the first woman from the state of Haryana to achieve this feat.

Bhukkal is also member of the All India Congress Committee (AICC).

== Electoral Performance ==
=== Assembly Election 2024 ===
2024 Haryana Legislative Assembly election: Jhajjar
Party	Candidate	Votes	%	±%
INC	Geeta Bhukkal	66,345	53.66%	▲11.86
BJP	Kaptan Birdhana	52,790	42.70%	▲14.39
JJP	Naseeb Sonu	1,836	1.48%	▼20.50
BSP	Dharambir Singh	816	0.66%	▼1.73
AAP	Mahinder Dahiya	738	0.60%	New
NOTA	None of the Above	449	0.36%	New
Margin of victory		13,555	10.96%	▼2.52
Turnout		1,23,641	65.07%	▲1.07
Registered electors		1,92,758		▲9.34
INC hold		Swing	▲11.86	

=== Assembly Election 2019 ===
2019 Haryana Legislative Assembly election: Jhajjar
Party	Candidate	Votes	%	±%
INC	Geeta Bhukkal	46,480	41.80%	▼6.44
BJP	Rakesh Kumar	31,481	28.31%	▲9.48
JJP	Naseeb Kumar	24,445	21.98%	New
LSP	Ajay Tanwar	4,116	3.70%	New
BSP	Ramdhan	2,653	2.39%	▲1.03
INLD	Jogender Singh	945	0.85%	▼22.58
Margin of victory		14,999	13.49%	▼11.32
Turnout		1,11,208	63.99%	▼3.75
Registered electors		1,73,787		▲9.85
INC hold		Swing	▼6.44	

=== Assembly Election 2014 ===
2014 Haryana Legislative Assembly election: Jhajjar
Party	Candidate	Votes	%	±%
INC	Geeta Bhukkal	51,697	48.24%	▼11.98
INLD	Sadhu Ram	25,113	23.43%	▼2.51
BJP	Dariyav Khatik	20,178	18.83%	▲15.69
Independent	Kaptan Birdhana	5,048	4.71%	New
BSP	Gopiram	1,452	1.35%	▼0.69
Independent	Vijay Kumar Punia	663	0.62%	New
HJC(BL)	Naresh Kumar	645	0.60%	▼4.54
Margin of victory		26,584	24.80%	▼9.48
Turnout		1,07,174	67.75%	▲8.31
Registered electors		1,58,202		▲16.02
INC hold		Swing	▼11.98	

=== Assembly Election 2009 ===
2009 Haryana Legislative Assembly election: Jhajjar
Party	Candidate	Votes	%	±%
INC	Geeta Bhukkal	48,806	60.22%	▲9.40
INLD	Kanta Devi	21,023	25.94%	▼8.39
HJC(BL)	Sachin Balmiki	4,165	5.14%	New
BJP	Azad Singh	2,539	3.13%	▼7.23
BSP	Kishore Kumar Rajora	1,660	2.05%	▲1.00
Independent	Surender Singh	1,615	1.99%	New
Independent	Rajal	446	0.55%	New
Margin of victory		27,783	34.28%	▲17.79
Turnout		81,046	59.44%	▼6.71
Registered electors		1,36,357		▲4.80
INC hold		Swing	▲9.40	

=== Assembly Election 2005 ===
2005 Haryana Legislative Assembly election: Kalayat
Party	Candidate	Votes	%	±%
INC	Geeta Bhukkal	35,730	42.56	17.10
INLD	Pritam	34,318	40.88	0.34
Independent	Baldev	7,795	9.29	
BJP	Jaswant Kumar	2,381	2.84	
Independent	Ramesh Kumar	1,579	1.88	
BSP	Balwan	1,450	1.73	−2.82
Independent	Om Parkash	488	0.58	
Margin of victory		1,412	1.68	−13.39
Turnout		83,945	77.73	8.89
Registered electors		1,07,989		5.17
INC gain from INLD		Swing	2.03	

== Personal life ==
Bhukkal is married to Dalbir Singh Bhukkal, and they have 3 children (Siddharth, Sukriti and Utkarsh).

== Positions held ==
- Member, All India Congress Committee
- Chairperson, Manifesto Committee, Haryana Pradesh Congress Committee
- Chairperson, Sub-Committee (National Level), Central Advisory Board of Education (CABE) for Extension of Right to Education Act to 10th & 10+2
- Chairperson, Sub-Committee (National Level), Central Advisory Board of Education (CABE) for Assessment & Implementation of Continuous and Comprehensive Evaluation (CCE) in the Context of the No Detention Provision in the Right of Children to Free and Compulsory Education Act, 2009
- Member, Bar Association of Hon'ble Punjab and Haryana High Court
- Member, Bar Council of Punjab and Haryana
- Ex-Member, Executive Committee, Haryana Pradesh Congress Committee
- Ex-General Secretary, Haryana Pradesh Congress Committee (Legal Cell)
- Ex-Organizing Secretary, Haryana Pradesh Congress Committee
- Nominated Member of Commonwealth Parliamentary Association (India Branch) 24.10.2008
- Member, State Vigilance & Monitoring Committee, Haryana; Member, State Environment & Pollution Control Committee, Haryana (07.06.2006 to 06.06.2008)
- Ex-Chairperson, Haryana Pradesh Congress Committee (Scheduled Castes Department)
