= Gandhra =

- Village (Rohtak)
- Location in Haryana, India Gandhra (India)
- Coordinates: 28.83°N 76.72°E
- Country: India
- State: Haryana

Population
  - Total: 10,000

Languages
  - Official: Hindi
- Time zone: UTC+5:30 (IST)
- PIN: 124529
- Vehicle registration: HR95
- Website: haryana.gov.in

Gandhra is a village in the Rohtak district of Haryana, India. It is 16 km from Rohtak, its district headquarters, km from tehsil Sampla, and 52 km west of Delhi, the capital of India. Nearby villages are Kharawar, Atail, Nonond, Paksma, Gijhhi-Dataur, Chuliana and Ismaila. In the 2011 Census of India, population of the village was 6241. This village is inhabited by four main castes viz jat, brahmin, chamar, and dhanak. All these four caste are almost equal in proportion. Teli, doom, jogi, bairagi, lohar, maniyar, lilgar and mali caste also comprise the village population.Baba Garib Nath Temple, Dada bhaiyya, chuganan mata and Lord Khatu Shyam Ji Temple are the sacred places.In Gandhra village 2 paane, one is Muktayan and the other is Mazadhyan. First Sarpanch of Gandhra village: Kudan bania

Chander Malik
Gangaram Malik
Teka Malik
Surte
Rajinder Malik
Naresh Malik
Dalbir Malik
Kartar
Kasturi
Anand
Rajni Devi
Yogesh Malik

The literacy rate of the village is about 90%. For health concern there is Govt. PHC as well as the charitable hospital Jain Dhramarth Aushdhyalya. There are two Govt. Senior Secondary Schools for boys and girls and one private school, Bal Kalyan High School. Naresh Malik, a former MLA, was born in Gandhra and first to win on a BJP ticket from hasangarh constituency.
