= Sultan Singh =

Indian politician (1923–2014)

Sultan Singh

Sultan Singh (19 September 1923 – 16 December 2014) was an Indian politician. He was a member of the Punjab Legislative Council and later the Rajya Sabha. He was the fifth governor of the state of Tripura, serving from 1989 to 1990. Singh died at a Ram Manohar Lohia Hospital in Delhi on 16 December 2014 following a long illness.

Singh was born at Nizampur Mazra village in Rohtak district, Haryana. He joined the Army where he developed links with revolutionaries. He left the Army and went to Kolkata to participate in India's freedom struggle. He came in contact with certain Congress leaders and joined the party. After India attained Independence, he became a member of the Punjab Legislative Council and later, the Member of Rajya Sabha three times. He also remained president of the Haryana Congress from 1978 and 1986. He later served as the governor of Tripura from 1989 to 1990.
