= Abdul Hafiz (VC) =

Charged at enemy lines in Burma

Rao Abdul Hafiz VC
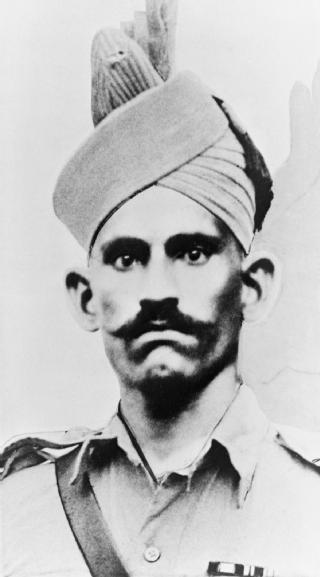
- Born: 4 September 1925; Kalanaur, Punjab, British India
- Died: 6 April 1944 (aged 18); Imphal, British India
- Burial place: Imphal Indian Army War Cemetery, Imphal, India
- Military career
- Allegiance: (British Raj) British India
- Branch: British Indian Army
- Rank: Jemadar Naib Subedar
- Units: 9th Jat Regiment
- Conflicts: World War II; Pacific War; Burma campaign; Burma campaign (1944–1945); Operation U-Go; Battle of Imphal †
- Awards: Victoria Cross

Rao Abdul Hafiz Khan VC (4 September 1925 – 6 April 1944) was an Indian recipient of the Victoria Cross, the highest and most prestigious award for gallantry in the face of the enemy that can be awarded to British and Commonwealth forces. He was the youngest Indian recipient of the award.

His was one of three World War II VCs awarded for action in British India, the others being awarded to John Pennington Harman and John Niel Randle both at the Battle of Kohima.

== Details ==
Rao Abdul Hafiz hailed from Kalanaur, British Punjab, born on the 4th of September, 1925 to Choudhry Nur Mohammed in a Muslim Rajput family of the Panwar clan. He was at the age of 18, and serving as Naib Subedar in the 9th Jat Regiment, British Indian Army during World War II, when he performed the deeds for which he was awarded the VC.

On 6 April 1944, during the Battle of Imphal, Naib Subedar Rao Abdul Hafiz Khan was ordered to attack with his platoon a prominent position held by the enemy, the only approach to which was across a bare slope and then up a very steep hill. The Naib Subedar led the assault, himself killing several of the enemy, pressing on regardless of machine-gun fire. He received two wounds, the second of which was fatal; but he had succeeded in routing an enemy vastly superior in numbers, and had captured a most important position.

The citation reads as follows:

The KING has been graciously pleased to approve the posthumous award of the VICTORIA CROSS to:–

Naib Subedar Abdul Hafiz Khan (11460), 9th. Jat Regiment, Indian Army.

In Burma, in the early hours of the 6th April, 1944, in the hills 10 miles North of Imphal, the enemy had attacked a standing patrol of 4 men and occupied a prominent feature overlooking a Company position. At first light a patrol was sent out and contacted the enemy, reporting that they thought approximately 40 enemy were in position. It was not known if they had dug in during the hours of darkness.

The Company Commander ordered Naib Subedar Abdul Hafiz Khan to attack the enemy, with two sections from his platoon, at 0930 hours. An artillery concentration was put down on the feature and Naib Subedar Abdul Hafiz Khan led the attack. The attack was up a completely bare slope with no cover, and was very steep near the crest. Prior to the attack, Naib Subedar Abdul Hafiz Khan assembled his sections and told them that they were invincible, and all the enemy on the hill would be killed or put to flight. He so inspired his men that from the start the attack proceeded with great dash. When a few yards below the crest the enemy opened fire with machine-guns and threw grenades. Naib Subedar Abdul Hafiz Khan sustained several casualties, but immediatetly [sic] ordered an assault, which he personally led, at the same time shouting the Mohammedan battle-cry. The assault went in without hesitation and with great dash up the last few yards of the hill, which was very steep. On reaching the crest Naib Subedar Abdul Hafiz Khan was wounded in the leg, but seeing a machine-gun firing from a flank, which had already caused several casualties, he immediately went towards it and seizing the barrel pushed it upwards, whilst another man killed the gunner. Naib Subedar Abdul Hafiz Khan then took a Bren gun from a wounded man and advanced against the enemy, firing as he advanced, and killing several of the enemy. So fierce was the attack, and all his men so inspired by the determination of Naib Subedar Abdul Hafiz Khan to kill all enemy in sight at whatever cost, that the enemy, who were still in considerable numbers on the position, ran away down the opposite slope of the hill. Regardless of machine-gun fire which was now being fired at him from another feature a few hundred yards away, he pursued the enemy, firing at them as they retired. Naib Subedar Abdul Hafiz Khan was badly wounded in the chest from this machine-gun fire and collapsed holding the Bren gun and attempting to fire at the retreating enemy, and shouting at the same time "Re-organise on the position and I will give covering fire." He died shortly afterwards.

The inspiring leadership and great bravery displayed by Naib Subedar Abdul Hafiz Khan in spite of having been twice wounded, once mortally, so encouraged his men that the position was captured, casualties inflicted on the enemy to an extent several times the size of his own party, and enemy arms recovered on the position which included 3 Lewis Machine-guns, 2 grenade dischargers and 2 officers' swords. The complete disregard for his own safety and his determination to capture and hold the position at all costs was an example to all ranks, which it would be difficult to equal.

— London Gazette, 27 July 1944.

== Further Information ==
Hafiz is one of four ethnic minority winners of the Victoria Cross featured in the Ministry of Defence publication "We were there"; the subject of the brochure being minorities contribution to Great Britain in wartime. The other winners listed were William Hall, Gian Singh and Kamal Ram

== The Medal ==
His VC is on display in the Lord Ashcroft Gallery at the Imperial War Museum, London.

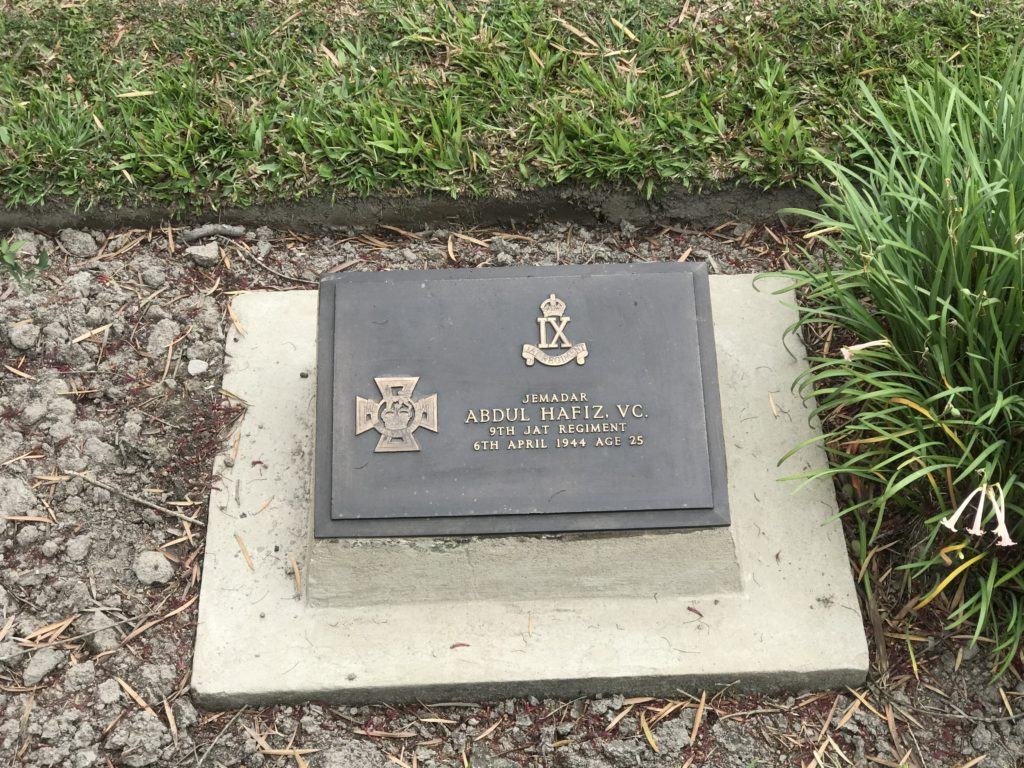
Grave of Naib Subedar Abdul Hafiz, Victoria Cross, 9 JAT Regiment

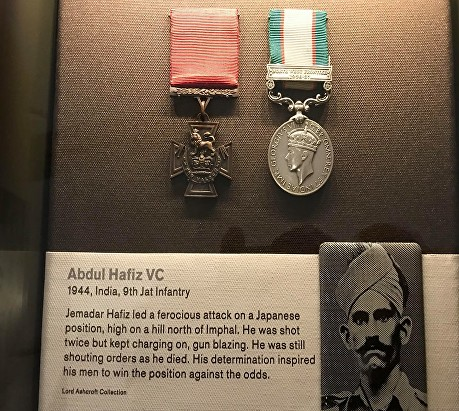
ABDUL HAFIZ, VICTORIA CROSS

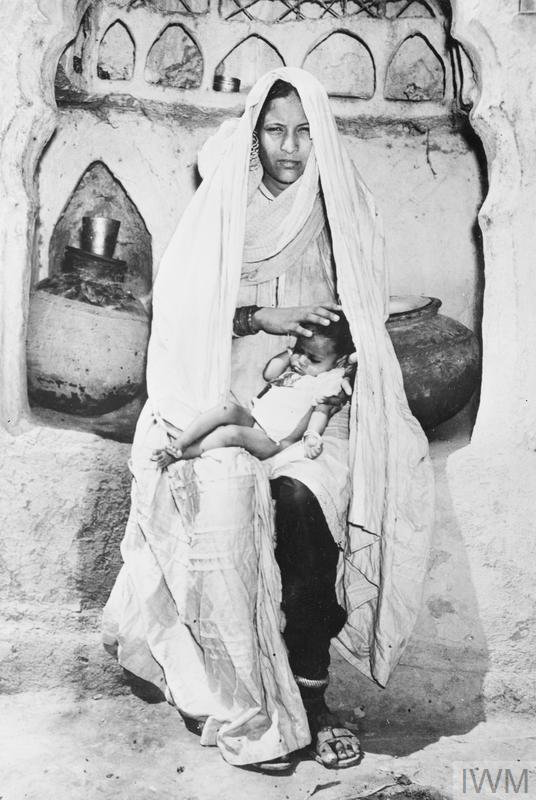
Jugri Begum, widow of Naib Subedar Abdul Hafiz V.C. of the 9th Jat Regiment, with her three month old daughter. Abdul Hafiz never saw the baby.
