= Morkheri =

Village in Haryana, India

Coordinates: 28°51′N 76°48′E

Morkheri is a village in Rohtak district of Haryana in India. Morkheri village now holds multiple Jat Gotra ethnicity. The 60% of the population has emigrated out to the cities. The village has many prominent residents and has contributed to the Military leaders, Engineering and Medical fields.

The village is a mere 30 km from Delhi border. Because if its significant location it is a developing village. At present the village has 1 government senior secondary school and also a private school. Recently the village has got its first college also named Vikramaditya Polytechnic College. According to India Business report by BBC London the people are engaged in agricultural activities.

== History ==
It is a small village with no ancient significance.

== Population ==
Approximately 2000 people according to 2011 census.

== Transport system ==
This village don't have any transport system. Village is situated on a approach road with no connectivity to cities. Only one bus runs at 2pm in the evening. Otherwise village residents have to use their own vehicle for transport.

== Education ==
- Senior Secondary Government School
- Vikramaditya College of education, (B.Ed, M.Ed. D.El.Ed)
- Recognized By NCTE Jaipur and affiliated to Chaudhary Ranbir Singh University Jind and SCERT, Gurgaon
- Vikramaditya Group of Educational Institutes

B.Ed and D.El.ED

- Vikramaditya Polytechnic

== Demography ==
It has sex ratio of 847 and literacy rate of 80% in males and 55% in females.

== Jat clans ==
- Dagar, Lakra, Tomar,Sehrawat and Sangwan in majority
