= Om Prakash Dhankar =

Indian politician

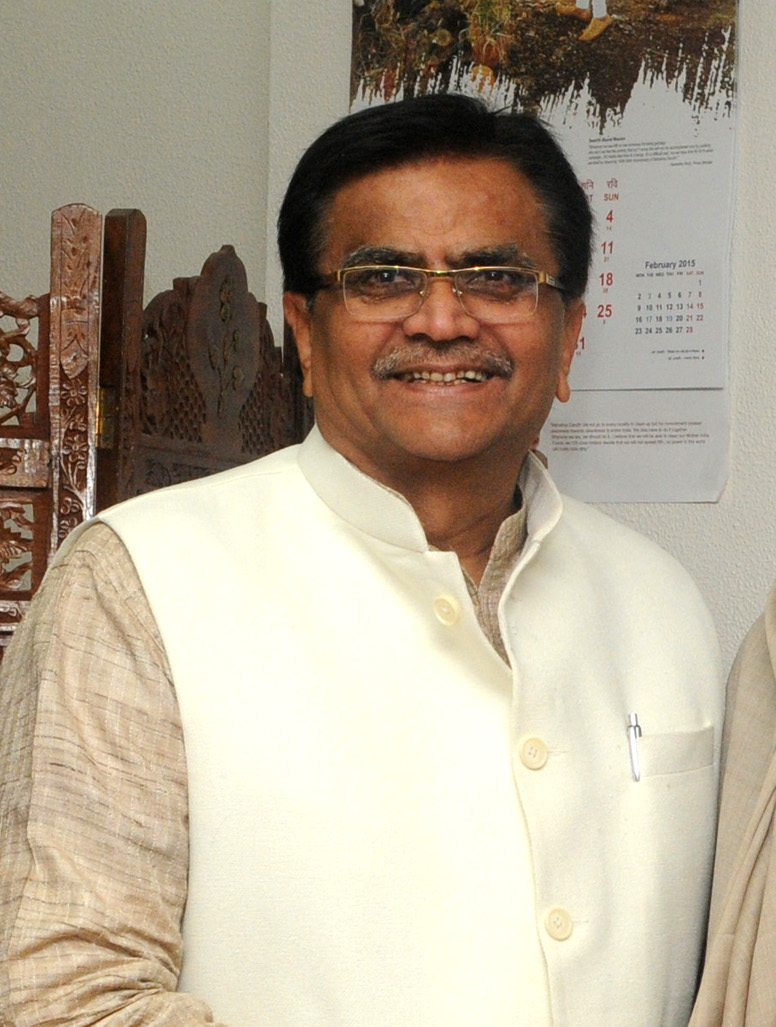

President of Bharatiya Janata Party, Haryana
- In office 19 July 2020 – 28 October 2023
- Preceded by: Subhash Barala
- Succeeded by: Nayab Singh Saini

Cabinet Minister Government of Haryana
- In office 26 October 2014 – 27 October 2019
- Ministry: Term
- Minister of Mines & Geology: 22 July 2016 – 27 October 2019
- Minister of Water Resources: 26 October 2014 – 22 July 2016
- Minister of Agriculture Minister of Rural Development Minister of Animal Husbandry, Dairying & Fisheries: 26 October 2014 – 27 October 2019

Member of Haryana Legislative Assembly
- In office 2014–2019
- Preceded by: Naresh Kumar
- Succeeded by: Kuldeep Vats
- Constituency: Badli

Personal details
- Born: 1 August 1961 (age 65) Dhakla, Punjab, India (now in Haryana, India)
- Party: Bharatiya Janata Party
- Children: Aditya, Ashutosh
- Education: Maharishi Dayanand University
- Occupation: Academic, Social Activist, Politician
- Website: www.bjpharyana.org

Om Prakash Dhankar also known as O. P. Dhankar (born 1 August 1961), is an Indian politician and social activist, belonging to the Bhartiya Janata Party (BJP) and formerly is the President of Bhartiya Janata Party, Haryana. He was a Cabinet Minister in the BJP run Government of Haryana till 2019.

He is the national coordinator for the Narendra Modi’s dream project- Statue of Unity Iron Collection Corporation Committee. O P Dhankar has been elected twice as BJP Kisan Morcha President (2011-2013), (2013-2015).

== Early life and background ==
O.P. Dhankhar was born in Village Dhakla, Jhajjar district in 1961 in the family of Ch. Vaid Mohabbat Singh and Smt Chhoto Devi. His grandfather Shri Raghuvir Singh worked as a Station Master for Indian Railways. The Philanthropic credentials of his family date back to his great grandfather who mobilized efforts to build the first school in his native village. Dhankhar received his elementary education from the village school before earning his Masters & M. Ed. from the Maharishi Dayanand University, Rohtak.

After his education, he served as a Geography Lecturer at Bhiwani for 11 years. As an academic, he published a book on analysis of education sector, with views on education reforms and issues concerning student lives.

== Social work ==
He has been associated with Rashtriya Swayamsevak Sangh (RSS) since 1978 as a Swayamsevak. In his words, he was driven by a mission and zeal to work for social causes and issues affecting youth and thus he worked for Akhil Bharatiya Vidyarthi Parishad (ABVP) from 1980 to 1996. He was part of various socio political movements and worked for youth affairs concerning systemic change in education sector. Later, he joined Swadeshi Jagaran Manch movement. To establish his credentials as a keen observer of life and dynamics of a civilized society, Mr. Dhankar delivered a rendition on Emotions Management.

Given the skewed sex ratio in Haryana and increasing instance of illegal trafficking of Bihari brides by Haryanavi males, O.P. Dhankhar advised a social solution and measured approach to resolve issues by developing bonds between Haryanvi and Bihari families through government intervention. This solution also courted controversy and there were opposing voices from Bihar leaders such as Lalu Yadav and Sharad Yadav. However, Sushil Modi supported O.P. Dhankhar on this issue.

== Political career ==
His political association spans over 30 years.

He has held key positions such as State General Secretary, State President, National Secretary, and National President in various BJP and its affiliate organizations. After eighteen years of association with RSS, in 1996 he joined BJP and performed duties as a national secretary during Vajpayee era. He was Pradesh Prabhari for Himachal Pradesh and greatly contributed to BJP government formation in the hilly state. he was also actively involved in publication of BJP Haryana official magazine Bhajpa Ki Baat in 2002.

He has held various padayatras and cycle yatras to agitate and protest against meager compensation and arbitrary land acquisition for Special Economic Zone. BJP Kisan Morcha has been demanding for implementation of recommendation of MS Swaminathan Commission, whereby 50% profit on input cost should be given to farmers. BJP had even promised in its election manifesto to implement Swaminathan Commission recommendation.

=== National President of BJP’s Kisan Morcha ===
Om Prakash Dhankhar got elected as National President of BJP’s Kisan Morcha twice in a row. As national president of BJP’s Kisan Morcha, OP Dhankhar worked & raised a range of issues namely Land Acquisition, Pesticide Management, Farmer’s Suicide, Farming Reforms. Swaminathan Report Implementation etc. O.P. Dhankhar played a key role in bringing about a Land Acquisition Handbook which addresses issues of farmers and industry alike by allowing enough opportunity for industrial growth.

=== National Coordinator of Sardar Patel Statue of Unity, Iron Collection Corporation Committee ===
O.P. Dhankhar is National Coordinator, Statue of Unity, Iron Collection Corporation Committee. Statue of Unity, Mr Narendra Modi’s dream project is touted to be the largest statue and an architectural marvel in the world. Iron and soil for the 182 metres tall statue of Sardar Patel, which will come up near the Sardar Sarovar Dam on the Narmada River, is being collected from farmers from across the country, thus making iron collection drive for the Statue Of Unity a nationwide socio cultural movement. Shri Narendra Modi assigned Mr Dhankhar a key role as the National Co-ordinator, Statue Of Unity, Iron Collection Corporation Committee.

=== 2014 Rohtak Lok Sabha Election: Lost ===
In 2014, he contested from Rohtak Parliamentary constituency against the son of Chief Minister, Haryana, Deepender Singh Hooda. O.P. Dhankhar finished second with 319436 votes (31%) and the Indian National Lok Dal candidate finished a poor third.

During Jhajjar Lok Sabha rally in April, Shri Narendra Modi has reportedly called O.P. Dhankhar as his close confidant and dedicated political leader who has effortlessly worked for last 30 years.

=== 2014 Haryana Vidhan Sabha Election: Won ===
He successfully contested as BJP’s candidate from badli constituency (by garnering 36.48% of total polled votes) in the 2014 Haryana Legislative Assembly election. Shri Om Prakash Dhankhar was a front runner claimant for the leadership position in the eventuality of BJP forming a government in Haryana in 2014 Assembly Elections. He led one of the legs of the four Vijay Sankalp Yatras organized by BJP for 2014 Haryana Assembly Elections.

=== 2014: Cabinet Minister of Haryana ===
The Cabinet Minister Om Prakash Dhankar has independent charge of the following 5 departments, which makes him 4th most influential in Government of Haryana after Chief Minister of Haryana Manohar Lal Khattar who holds 18 departments, Cabinet Minister Captain Abhimanyu Singh Sindhu who holds 13 departments and Cabinet Minister Ram Bilas Sharma who holds 9 departments.

- Department of Agriculture, Haryana Official website
- Department of Animal Husbandry & Dairying, Haryana, Official website
- Department of Fisheries, Haryana Official website
- Department of Development & Panchayats, Haryana, Official website
- Department of Irrigation, Haryana Official website
