= Assan, Rohtak =

Assan (Rohtak)
- Village (Rohtak)
- Location in Haryana, India Assan (Rohtak) (India)
- Coordinates: 28.89°N 76.59°E
- Country: India
- State: Haryana

Languages
  - Official: Hindi
- Time zone: UTC+5:30 (IST)
- Vehicle registration: HR
- Website: haryana.gov.in

Assan is a village in Rohtak district of Haryana, India. It was founded by Master Ram Sawroop Hooda. District elementary education officer Rohtak has set up a High School in the village. It is 17 km away from the main district Rohtak.
