= Chiri, Rohtak =

Chiri
- Village
- Location in Haryana, India Chiri (India)
- Coordinates: 29.06°N 76.53°E
- Country: India
- State: Haryana

Languages
  - Official: Hindi
- Time zone: UTC+5:30 (IST)
- PIN: 124514
- Vehicle registration: HR
- Website: haryana.gov.in

Jat gotra is Dalal

Chiri is a village in Rohtak district of Haryana, India. According to 2011 Census of India population of the village is 9,735. The village is ruled by Gram Panchayat.
