= Kalanaur Assembly constituency =

Legislative Assembly constituency in Haryana State, India

Coordinates: 28.83°N 76.39°E

Kalanaur
- Constituency No. 63 for the Haryana Legislative Assembly

Constituency details
- Country: India
- Region: North India
- State: Haryana
- District: Rohtak
- Lok Sabha constituency: Rohtak
- Total electors: 2,17,185
- Reservation: SC

Member of Legislative Assembly
- 15th Haryana Legislative Assembly
- Incumbent Shakuntla Khatak
- Party: Indian National Congress

Kalanaur is one of the 90 Legislative Assembly constituencies of Haryana state in India.

It is part of Rohtak district and is reserved for candidates belonging to the Scheduled Castes.

== Members of the Legislative Assembly ==
| Year | Member | Party |
|---|---|---|
| 1967 | Nasib Singh | Bharatiya Jana Sangh |
| 1968 | Satram Dass | Bharatiya Jana Sangh |
| 1972 | Satram Dass | Indian National Congress |
| 1977 | Jai Narain | Janata Party |
| 1982 | Kartar Devi | Indian National Congress |
| 1987 | Jai Narian | Bharatiya Janata Party |
| 1991 | Kartar Devi | Indian National Congress |
| 1996 | Kartar Devi | Indian National Congress |
| 2000 | Sarita Narian | Bharatiya Janata Party |
| 2005 | Kartar Devi | Indian National Congress |
| 2009 | Shakuntla Khatak | Indian National Congress |
| 2014 | Shakuntla Khatak | Indian National Congress |
| 2019 | Shakuntla Khatak | Indian National Congress |
| 2024 | Shakuntla Khatak | Indian National Congress |

== Election results ==
=== Assembly Election 2024 ===
2024 Haryana Legislative Assembly election: KALANAUR
| Party | Candidate | Votes | % | ±% |
|---|---|---|---|---|
| INC | Shakuntla Khatak | 69,348 | 48.41% | ▲1.87 |
| BJP | Renu Dabla | 57,116 | 39.87% | ▲1.29 |
| Independent | Prem Pradhan | 11,415 | 7.97% | New |
| BSP | Poonam Nigana | 1,394 | 0.97% | ▼3.23 |
| JJP | Mahender Sundana | 1,191 | 0.83% | ▼5.52 |
| AAP | Naresh Bagri | 1,062 | 0.74% | New |
| NOTA | None of the Above | 429 | 0.30% | New |
| Margin of victory | | 12,232 | 8.54% | ▲0.58 |
| Turnout | | 1,43,261 | 66.28% | ▼0.99 |
| Registered electors | | 2,17,185 | | ▲8.86 |
| INC hold | | Swing | ▲1.87 | |

=== Assembly Election 2019 ===
2019 Haryana Legislative Assembly election: KALANAUR
| Party | Candidate | Votes | % | ±% |
|---|---|---|---|---|
| INC | Shakuntla Khatak | 62,151 | 38.53% | ▲6.90 |
| BJP | Ramavtar Balmiki | 71,527 | 44.58% | ▲2.07 |
| JJP | Rajender Valmiki | 8,482 | 6.35% | New |
| BSP | Kashmiri Devi | 5,613 | 4.20% | ▲2.30 |
| LSP | Phul Singh | 2,219 | 1.66% | New |
| INLD | Baljraj Khasa Bhalli | 1,100 | 0.82% | ▼17.46 |
| CPI(M) | Kamlesh | 795 | 0.60% | New |
| Margin of victory | | 9,624 | 6.95% | ▲4.83 |
| Turnout | | 1,33,558 | 67.26% | ▼4.59 |
| Registered electors | | 1,98,561 | | ▲12.08 |
| INC hold | | Swing | ▲6.90 | |

=== Assembly Election 2014 ===
2014 Haryana Legislative Assembly election: KALANAUR
| Party | Candidate | Votes | % | ±% |
|---|---|---|---|---|
| INC | Shakuntla Khatak | 50,451 | 39.63% | ▼17.09 |
| BJP | Ram Avtar Balmiki | 46,479 | 36.51% | ▲24.44 |
| INLD | Fakir Chand | 23,280 | 18.29% | ▼8.13 |
| BSP | Ashok Kumar | 2,427 | 1.91% | New |
| Independent | Jai Hind | 1,111 | 0.87% | New |
| Independent | Menpal | 858 | 0.67% | New |
| HJC(BL) | Parmod Singhpuria | 822 | 0.65% | ▼0.14 |
| Margin of victory | | 3,972 | 3.12% | ▼27.19 |
| Turnout | | 1,27,299 | 71.86% | ▲9.72 |
| Registered electors | | 1,77,154 | | ▲19.76 |
| INC hold | | Swing | ▼17.09 | |

=== Assembly Election 2009 ===
2009 Haryana Legislative Assembly election: KALANAUR
| Party | Candidate | Votes | % | ±% |
|---|---|---|---|---|
| INC | Shakuntla Khatak | 52,142 | 56.72% | ▲7.55 |
| INLD | Naga Ram | 24,282 | 26.42% | ▼14.53 |
| BJP | Ramavtar | 11,097 | 12.07% | ▲8.09 |
| CPI(M) | Bijender Baliana | 1,306 | 1.42% | New |
| HJC(BL) | Ramdhari | 719 | 0.78% | New |
| Independent | Satyawan Ranga | 673 | 0.73% | New |
| Upekshit Samaj Party | Dharampal Pacharwal | 652 | 0.71% | New |
| LJP | Mukesh | 487 | 0.53% | ▼0.62 |
| Margin of victory | | 27,860 | 30.31% | ▲22.07 |
| Turnout | | 91,922 | 62.14% | ▼8.11 |
| Registered electors | | 1,47,923 | | ▲46.44 |
| INC hold | | Swing | ▲7.55 | |

=== Assembly Election 2005 ===
2005 Haryana Legislative Assembly election: KALANAUR
| Party | Candidate | Votes | % | ±% |
|---|---|---|---|---|
| INC | Kartar Devi | 34,896 | 49.18% | ▲7.88 |
| INLD | Mewa Singh | 29,053 | 40.94% | New |
| BJP | Sarita Narian | 2,824 | 3.98% | ▼41.65 |
| BSP | Satveer | 1,928 | 2.72% | ▼0.38 |
| LJP | Parmod Singhpuria | 814 | 1.15% | New |
| Independent | Satayveer | 691 | 0.97% | New |
| Margin of victory | | 5,843 | 8.23% | ▲3.90 |
| Turnout | | 70,959 | 70.25% | ▲6.47 |
| Registered electors | | 1,01,011 | | ▲10.94 |
| INC gain from BJP | | Swing | ▲3.55 | |

=== Assembly Election 2000 ===
2000 Haryana Legislative Assembly election: KALANAUR
| Party | Candidate | Votes | % | ±% |
|---|---|---|---|---|
| BJP | Sarita Narian | 26,498 | 45.63% | ▲18.72 |
| INC | Kartar Devi | 23,981 | 41.29% | ▲12.83 |
| HVP | Jai Hind | 3,630 | 6.25% | New |
| BSP | Satbir | 1,799 | 3.10% | New |
| Independent | Somesh | 742 | 1.28% | New |
| Independent | Jagbir Singh | 393 | 0.68% | New |
| Independent | Kamal Kumar | 345 | 0.59% | New |
| Margin of victory | | 2,517 | 4.33% | ▲2.78 |
| Turnout | | 58,073 | 64.36% | ▲0.48 |
| Registered electors | | 91,054 | | ▼1.94 |
| BJP gain from INC | | Swing | ▲17.16 | |

=== Assembly Election 1996 ===
1996 Haryana Legislative Assembly election: KALANAUR
| Party | Candidate | Votes | % | ±% |
|---|---|---|---|---|
| INC | Kartar Devi | 16,733 | 28.47% | ▼20.90 |
| BJP | Jai Narain | 15,818 | 26.91% | ▲22.17 |
| SAP | Surat Singh | 13,937 | 23.71% | New |
| Independent | Shamsher Singh | 7,724 | 13.14% | New |
| Independent | Chand Ram | 1,288 | 2.19% | New |
| Independent | Sumitra Devi W/O Jagram | 1,028 | 1.75% | New |
| Independent | Ramkumar | 468 | 0.80% | New |
| Independent | Kanta | 371 | 0.63% | New |
| JD | Labh Singh | 335 | 0.57% | New |
| JP | Birmati | 312 | 0.53% | ▼29.36 |
| Margin of victory | | 915 | 1.56% | ▼17.92 |
| Turnout | | 58,779 | 65.77% | ▲4.61 |
| Registered electors | | 92,858 | | ▲2.70 |
| INC hold | | Swing | ▼20.90 | |

=== Assembly Election 1991 ===
1991 Haryana Legislative Assembly election: KALANAUR
| Party | Candidate | Votes | % | ±% |
|---|---|---|---|---|
| INC | Kartar Devi | 26,194 | 49.36% | ▲16.02 |
| JP | Hardul | 15,859 | 29.89% | New |
| HVP | Surat Singh | 7,863 | 14.82% | New |
| BJP | Jai Narayan | 2,516 | 4.74% | ▼55.32 |
| Independent | Labh Singh | 320 | 0.60% | New |
| Margin of victory | | 10,335 | 19.48% | ▼7.23 |
| Turnout | | 53,062 | 60.78% | ▼5.11 |
| Registered electors | | 90,415 | | ▲11.77 |
| INC gain from BJP | | Swing | ▼10.70 | |

=== Assembly Election 1987 ===
1987 Haryana Legislative Assembly election: KALANAUR
| Party | Candidate | Votes | % | ±% |
|---|---|---|---|---|
| BJP | Jai Narian | 30,996 | 60.06% | ▲23.66 |
| INC | Kartar Devi | 17,211 | 33.35% | ▼25.38 |
| Independent | Fateh Singh | 467 | 0.90% | New |
| Independent | Pat Ram | 351 | 0.68% | New |
| Independent | Bishna Ram | 339 | 0.66% | New |
| Independent | Bela Ram | 309 | 0.60% | New |
| VHP | Bal Kishan | 293 | 0.57% | New |
| Independent | Murti Ram | 282 | 0.55% | New |
| Margin of victory | | 13,785 | 26.71% | ▲4.38 |
| Turnout | | 51,608 | 65.86% | ▲2.86 |
| Registered electors | | 80,893 | | ▲15.52 |
| BJP gain from INC | | Swing | ▲1.33 | |

=== Assembly Election 1982 ===
1982 Haryana Legislative Assembly election: KALANAUR
| Party | Candidate | Votes | % | ±% |
|---|---|---|---|---|
| INC | Kartar Devi | 25,060 | 58.73% | ▲37.44 |
| BJP | Jai Narain | 15,531 | 36.40% | New |
| Independent | Labh Singh | 450 | 1.05% | New |
| Independent | Kehar Singh | 426 | 1.00% | New |
| JP | Suraj Bhan S/O Chandgi | 395 | 0.93% | ▼68.87 |
| Margin of victory | | 9,529 | 22.33% | ▼26.18 |
| Turnout | | 42,670 | 61.85% | ▲4.33 |
| Registered electors | | 70,025 | | ▲19.18 |
| INC gain from JP | | Swing | ▼11.07 | |

=== Assembly Election 1977 ===
1977 Haryana Legislative Assembly election: KALANAUR
| Party | Candidate | Votes | % | ±% |
|---|---|---|---|---|
| JP | Jai Narain | 23,213 | 69.80% | New |
| INC | Kartar Devi | 7,079 | 21.29% | ▼24.67 |
| Independent | Chandan Singh | 1,425 | 4.28% | New |
| Independent | Jalwant Singh | 539 | 1.62% | New |
| Independent | Ram Phall | 529 | 1.59% | New |
| Independent | Om Prakash | 209 | 0.63% | New |
| Independent | Raghbir Singh | 176 | 0.53% | New |
| Margin of victory | | 16,134 | 48.51% | ▲45.69 |
| Turnout | | 33,257 | 57.20% | ▼10.10 |
| Registered electors | | 58,754 | | ▲8.85 |
| JP gain from INC | | Swing | ▲23.84 | |

=== Assembly Election 1972 ===
1972 Haryana Legislative Assembly election: KALANAUR
| Party | Candidate | Votes | % | ±% |
|---|---|---|---|---|
| INC | Satram Dass | 16,546 | 45.95% | ▲13.74 |
| ABJS | Nasib Singh | 15,531 | 43.14% | ▲0.87 |
| Independent | Ishwar Singh | 3,177 | 8.82% | New |
| Independent | Rattan Singh | 751 | 2.09% | New |
| Margin of victory | | 1,015 | 2.82% | ▼7.23 |
| Turnout | | 36,005 | 68.41% | ▲6.96 |
| Registered electors | | 53,978 | | ▲9.52 |
| INC gain from ABJS | | Swing | ▲3.69 | |

=== Assembly Election 1968 ===
1968 Haryana Legislative Assembly election: KALANAUR
| Party | Candidate | Votes | % | ±% |
|---|---|---|---|---|
| ABJS | Satram Dass | 12,446 | 42.26% | ▼8.94 |
| INC | Badlu Ram | 9,487 | 32.22% | ▲4.01 |
| Independent | Kartar Devi | 4,850 | 16.47% | New |
| VHP | Ishwar Singh | 2,665 | 9.05% | New |
| Margin of victory | | 2,959 | 10.05% | ▼12.95 |
| Turnout | | 29,448 | 60.98% | ▼13.97 |
| Registered electors | | 49,288 | | ▲2.76 |
| ABJS hold | | Swing | ▼8.94 | |

=== Assembly Election 1967 ===
1967 Haryana Legislative Assembly election: KALANAUR
| Party | Candidate | Votes | % | ±% |
|---|---|---|---|---|
| ABJS | Nasib Singh | 18,103 | 51.20% | New |
| INC | S. Singh | 9,972 | 28.20% | New |
| SSP | Kartar Devi | 6,379 | 18.04% | New |
| RPI | R. Sarup | 902 | 2.55% | New |
| Margin of victory | | 8,131 | 23.00% | |
| Turnout | | 35,356 | 76.12% | |
| Registered electors | | 47,962 | | |
| ABJS win (new seat) | | | | |

== See also ==
- List of constituencies of the Haryana Legislative Assembly
- Rohtak district
