= D. P. Vats =

Lt. General D. P. Vats

Member of Parliament, Rajya Sabha
- In office 3 April 2018 – 2 April 2024
- Preceded by: Shadi Lal Batra
- Constituency: Haryana

Personal details
- Born: 16 April 1950 (age 76) Thurana village, Hisar district
- Party: Bharatiya Janata Party
- Spouse: Geeta Vats
- Children: Shaan Vats, Sumedha Vats & Rommel Vats
- Education: M.B.B.S., M.S. (Ophthalmology)
- Alma mater: AIIMS, New Delhi, Armed Forces Medical College, PGIMS Rohtak,

Military service
- Allegiance: India
- Branch/service: Indian Army
- Years of service: 1975–2011
- Rank: Lt. General
- Unit: Army Medical Corps

Devender Paul Vats is an Indian politician and a retired Lt. General of the Indian Army and former chief of the Haryana Public Service Commission. He is a noted ophthalmologist and was Advisor General & CEO at Maharaja Agrasen Medical College, Agroha, Hisar (city).

He completed his education from the Pandit Bhagwat Dayal Sharma Post Graduate Institute of Medical Sciences in Rohtak, before joining the Army Medical Corps in 1975. He completed his medical training from All India Institute of Medical Sciences, Delhi.

He has been awarded the Vishisht Seva Medal in 1999, Sena Medal in 2003 and Param Vishist Seva Medal in 2011. He was serving as director and commandant in armed forces medical college Pune and retired on 30 April 2011.
