= Manish Grover =

Indian politician

Minister of State Government of Haryana
- In office 22 July 2016 – 27 October 2019
- Ministry: Term
- Minister of Co-operation (Independent Charge): 22 July 2016–27 October 2019
- Minister of Urban Development: 22 July 2016–27 October 2019

Member of Haryana Legislative Assembly
- In office 2014–2019
- Preceded by: Bharat Bhushan Batra
- Succeeded by: Bharat Bhushan Batra
- Constituency: Rohtak

Personal details
- Born: 15 July 1954 (age 71) Rohtak, Punjab, India
- Party: Bharatiya Janata Party
- Occupation: Politician

Manish Grover (born 15 July 1954) is a Bharatiya Janata Party (BJP) politician and a former Member of the Legislative Assembly, representing Rohtak constituency in the Vidhan Sabha.

== Personal life ==
Manish Grover was born to Wazir Chand and Seeta Devi Grover on 15 July 1954 in Rohtak. He joined Jan Sangh in 1971. In 1987, he successfully contested the Municipal Corporation Elections from Ghani Pura, Rohtak.

He married Veena Grover on 3 February 1982. They have two children Himanshu and Rashmi. Himanshu is married to Somya Khurana and lives in Rohtak. Rashmi is married to Gaurav Ahuja, and lives in Delhi.
