= Shakuntla Khatak =

Indian politician

Member of the Haryana Legislative Assembly
- Incumbent
- Assumed office 2009
- Preceded by: Kartar Devi
- Constituency: Kalanaur

Personal details
- Born: 10 April 1968 (age 57)
- Political party: Indian National Congress
- Spouse: Attar Singh Khanagwal
- Children: 3

Shakuntla Khatak (born 10 April 1968) is a member of the Haryana Legislative Assembly from the Indian National Congress representing the Kalanaur constituency. She was re-elected in 2014 and 2019.
