= Kuldeep Vats =

Indian politician

Member of Haryana Legislative Assembly
- Incumbent
- Assumed office October 2024
- Preceded by: O. P. Dhankar, BJP
- Constituency: Badli

Member of Haryana Legislative Assembly
- In office October 2019 – September 2024
- Preceded by: O. P. Dhankar, BJP
- Constituency: Badli

Personal details
- Born: 5 May 1975 (age 51) Surehti, Haryana, India
- Party: Indian National Congress
- Spouse: Babita Vats
- Children: 3
- Website: https://kuldeepvats.in/

Kuldeep Vats (born 5 May 1975) is an Indian politician from Haryana. He won from Badli Assembly constituency representing the Indian National Congress in the 2019 Haryana Legislative Assembly election. The Congress party nominated him to contest again from Badli in the 2024 Haryana Legislative Assembly election. He won from the constituency again.

== Early life and education ==
Vats is from surehati village Badli, Jhajjar district, Haryana. He is the son of late Sat Narayan. He completed his Class 10 exam conducted by Board of School Education, Haryana in 1992.

== Career ==
Kuldeep Vats is an Indian politician from Haryana and a member of the Indian National Congress. He represents the Badli Assembly constituency in the Haryana Legislative Assembly.

In the 2019 Haryana Legislative Assembly election, he won the Badli seat with 45,441 votes, defeating Bharatiya Janata Party (BJP) candidate Om Prakash Dhankhar by a margin of 11,245 votes.

In the 2024 Haryana Legislative Assembly election, he was re-elected from Badli, securing 68,160 votes and again defeating BJP candidate Om Prakash Dhankhar by a margin of 16,820 votes.

He has served as MLA for the Badli constituency since October 2019, winning consecutive terms in 2019 and 2024
