= Badli, Haryana Assembly constituency =

Legislative Assembly constituency in Haryana State, India

Coordinates: 28.57°N 76.81°E

Badli
- Constituency No. 65 for the Haryana Legislative Assembly

Constituency details
- Country: India
- Region: North India
- State: Haryana
- District: Jhajjar
- Lok Sabha constituency: Rohtak
- Total electors: 1,89,162
- Reservation: None

Member of Legislative Assembly
- 15th Haryana Legislative Assembly
- Incumbent Kuldeep Vats
- Party: Indian National Congress

Badli is one of the 90 Legislative Assembly constituencies of Haryana, a state in northern India.

It is part of Jhajjar district. The constituency is represented by Kuldeep Vats of the Indian National Congress, who first won from here in the 2019 elections, and again in the 2024 Haryana Legislative Assembly election.

== Members of the Legislative Assembly ==
Year	Member	Party
1977	Hardwari Lal Dalal	Independent
1978^	Udey Singh Dalal	Janata Party
1982	Dheerpal Singh Gulia	Lokdal
1987	Dheerpal Singh Gulia	Lokdal
1991	Dheerpal Singh Gulia	Janata Party
1996	Dheerpal Singh Gulia	Samata Party
2000	Dheerpal Singh Gulia	Indian National Lok Dal
2005	Naresh Kumar	Independent
2009	Naresh Kumar	Indian National Congress
2014	Om Prakash Dhankar	Bharatiya Janata Party
2019	Kuldeep Vats	Indian National Congress
2024	Kuldeep Vats	Indian National Congress

== Election results ==
=== Assembly Election 2024 ===
2024 Haryana Legislative Assembly election: Badli
Party	Candidate	Votes	%	±%
INC	Kuldeep Vats	68,160	51.52	▲13.98
BJP	Om Prakash Dhankar	51,340	38.81	▲10.56
Independent	Ajit Gulia Jeete	10,820	8.18	New
NOTA	None of the Above	411	0.31	New
Margin of victory		16,820	12.71	▲3.42
Turnout		1,32,300	70.52	▲1.58
Registered electors		1,89,162		▲6.85
INC hold		Swing	▲13.98	

=== Assembly Election 2019 ===
2019 Haryana Legislative Assembly election: Badli
Party	Candidate	Votes	%	±%
INC	Kuldeep Vats	45,441	37.54	▲24.85
BJP	Dr. O. P. Dhankar	34,196	28.25	▼8.22
JJP	Sanjay Kablana	28,145	23.25	New
Independent	Dharmpal	5,474	4.52	New
BSP	Pradeep Raiya	3,955	3.27	▲2.35
Rashtriya Janta Party	Naresh Pal	1,521	1.26	New
Margin of victory		11,245	9.29	▲1.16
Turnout		1,21,050	68.94	▼1.93
Registered electors		1,75,575		▲9.22
INC gain from BJP		Swing	▲1.07	

=== Assembly Election 2014 ===
2014 Haryana Legislative Assembly election: Badli
Party	Candidate	Votes	%	±%
BJP	Dr. O. P. Dhankar	41,549	36.47	▲22.64
Independent	Kuldeep Vats	32,283	28.34	New
INLD	Sumitra Dhirpal Singh	16,594	14.57	▲3.50
INC	Naresh Kumar	14,452	12.69	▼24.05
Independent	Bir Singh Chauhan	2,246	1.97	New
HLP	Nahar Singh	1,936	1.70	New
Independent	Rati Ram Chhanparia	1,345	1.18	New
Independent	Bijender Majra	1,294	1.14	New
BSP	Manraj Gulia	1,043	0.92	▼7.21
Margin of victory		9,266	8.13	▼6.65
Turnout		1,13,929	70.87	▲5.35
Registered electors		1,60,750		▲16.59
BJP gain from INC		Swing	▼0.26	

=== Assembly Election 2009 ===
2009 Haryana Legislative Assembly election: Badli
Party	Candidate	Votes	%	±%
INC	Naresh Kumar	33,186	36.73	▲3.16
Independent	Brijender Singh Chahar	19,828	21.95	New
BJP	Sanjay Kablana	12,495	13.83	▲11.70
INLD	Rajender Singh	9,993	11.06	▼5.10
BSP	Manoj Yadav	7,338	8.12	▲6.43
HJC(BL)	Raj Kanwar Alias Raju Dawla	3,268	3.62	New
Independent	Dr. O. P. Dhankar	753	0.83	New
Rashtriya Arya Raj Sabha	Jeetram Alias Arya Jitender Gulia	588	0.65	New
Upekshit Samaj Party	Ram Kanwar	520	0.58	New
Independent	Parveen Kumar	479	0.53	New
Independent	Vinod Kumar	466	0.52	New
Margin of victory		13,358	14.79	▲11.43
Turnout		90,348	65.53	▼5.62
Registered electors		1,37,879		▲25.63
INC gain from Independent		Swing	▼0.20	

=== Assembly Election 2005 ===
2005 Haryana Legislative Assembly election: Badli
Party	Candidate	Votes	%	±%
Independent	Naresh Kumar	28,838	36.93	New
INC	Chatar Singh	26,216	33.57	▲0.23
INLD	Kali Ram	12,619	16.16	▼31.95
Independent	Ramesh Singh	6,502	8.33	New
BJP	Lalit Kumar	1,666	2.13	New
BSP	Sant Ram	1,324	1.70	New
Independent	Bijender	888	1.14	New
Margin of victory		2,622	3.36	▼11.41
Turnout		78,084	71.15	▲3.47
Registered electors		1,09,750		▲12.75
Independent gain from INLD		Swing	▼11.18	

=== Assembly Election 2000 ===
2000 Haryana Legislative Assembly election: Badli
Party	Candidate	Votes	%	±%
INLD	Dheer Pal Singh	31,694	48.11	New
INC	Naresh Kumar	21,968	33.35	▲13.14
HVP	Satpal	11,119	16.88	▼9.78
Independent	Hari Singh	406	0.62	New
NCP	Dharmender	400	0.61	New
Margin of victory		9,726	14.76	▲6.41
Turnout		65,875	67.68	▲0.14
Registered electors		97,336		▼1.25
INLD gain from SAP		Swing	▲13.10	

=== Assembly Election 1996 ===
1996 Haryana Legislative Assembly election: Badli
Party	Candidate	Votes	%	±%
SAP	Dheer Pal Singh	23,305	35.01	New
HVP	Manphool Singh	17,743	26.66	▼3.09
INC	Ishwar Singh	13,450	20.21	▲8.52
Independent	Satvir	4,309	6.47	New
AIIC(T)	Somvir	3,666	5.51	New
Janhit Morcha	Daya Sagar	2,626	3.95	New
JP	Sanjay Kumar	340	0.51	▼51.01
Margin of victory		5,562	8.36	▼13.42
Turnout		66,564	69.61	▲7.85
Registered electors		98,565		▲3.51
SAP gain from JP		Swing	▼16.51	

=== Assembly Election 1991 ===
1991 Haryana Legislative Assembly election: Badli
Party	Candidate	Votes	%	±%
JP	Dheer Pal Singh	29,284	51.52	New
HVP	Manphool Singh	16,908	29.75	New
INC	Hardwari Lal	6,642	11.69	▼21.74
Independent	Udey Singh	2,574	4.53	New
BJP	Jaswant Singh	412	0.72	New
Margin of victory		12,376	21.77	▼6.89
Turnout		56,836	62.05	▼5.78
Registered electors		95,223		▲9.17
JP gain from LKD		Swing	▼10.56	

=== Assembly Election 1987 ===
1987 Haryana Legislative Assembly election: Badli
Party	Candidate	Votes	%	±%
LKD	Dheer Pal Singh	35,451	62.08	▼1.08
INC	Man Phul Singh	19,085	33.42	▲1.27
VHP	Rati Ram	1,467	2.57	New
Independent	Ram Mehar	806	1.41	New
Margin of victory		16,366	28.66	▼2.35
Turnout		57,104	67.47	▲0.15
Registered electors		87,227		▲19.20
LKD hold		Swing	▼1.08	

=== Assembly Election 1982 ===
1982 Haryana Legislative Assembly election: Badli
Party	Candidate	Votes	%	±%
LKD	Dheer Pal Singh	30,193	63.17	New
INC	Manphool Singh	15,370	32.15	New
Independent	Ram Kumar Goel	1,083	2.27	New
Independent	Bhajan Lal	375	0.78	New
Independent	Amar Singh	295	0.62	New
Margin of victory		14,823	31.01	
Turnout		47,800	66.06	
Registered electors		73,178		
LKD gain from JP		Swing		

=== Assembly By-election 1978 ===
1978 Haryana Legislative Assembly by-election: Badli
Party	Candidate	Votes	%	±%
JP	Udey Singh	19,742		
Independent	P.Singh	9,263		New
INC(I)	B.Lal	8,188		New
Independent	C.Bhan	5,279		New
INC	H.Singh	1,600		
Margin of victory		10,479		
JP gain from Independent		Swing		

=== Assembly Election 1977 ===
1977 Haryana Legislative Assembly election: Badli
Party	Candidate	Votes	%	±%
Independent	Hardwari Lal	12,715	34.88	New
JP	Udey Singh	12,328	33.82	New
INC	Hari Singh	6,292	17.26	New
Independent	Rajinder Singh	2,190	6.01	New
Independent	Mehant Ganga Sagar	1,909	5.24	New
Independent	Jai Narain	1,022	2.80	New
Margin of victory		387	1.06	
Turnout		36,456	59.43	
Registered electors		61,882		
Independent win (new seat)				

== See also ==
- List of constituencies of the Haryana Legislative Assembly
- Jhajjar district
