= Kalanaur, Haryana =

Kalanaur
- Town
- Location in Haryana, India
- Coordinates: 28.83°N 76.4°E
- Country: India
- State: Haryana
- District: Rohtak
- Elevation: 200 m (660 ft)

Population (2011)
  - Total: 23,319

Languages
  - Official: Hindi
- Time zone: UTC+5:30 (IST)
- ISO 3166 code: IN-HR
- Vehicle registration: HR-12
- Website: haryana.gov.in

Kalanaur is a town and a municipal committee in Rohtak district of the north Indian state of Haryana.

== History ==
According to accounts recorded in Haryana state gazetteers, the name of the town is traditionally associated with Kalyan Singh, a Panwar Rajput chief. It is said that the son of Kalyan Singh married a daughter of the Tomara ruler Anangpal of Delhi, after which Anangpal granted Kalyan Singh territory in the Rohtak region. A settlement founded by him subsequently developed into the town known as Kalanaur, the name being derived from Kalyan Singh.

== Communities ==
The Kalanaur region has historically been associated with the Panwar Rajput clan. According to regional historical accounts, Panwar (Parmar) Rajputs are traditionally associated with the early settlement of the area. Historical accounts indicate that Panwar Rajputs established settlements in the region after receiving land grants west of Rohtak, leading to the foundation of Kalanaur and neighbouring villages.

The surrounding countryside of Kalanaur consists of numerous villages. Historically, groups of villages in the Meham–Kalanaur region were also organised under traditional clan-based structures such as the Panwar Rajput khap(Cluster of 36 Panwar Rajput village).

== Geography ==
Kalanaur is located at 28.83°N 76.4°E. It has an average elevation of 200 metres (656 feet).

== Demographics ==
As of 2001 India census, Kalanaur had a population of 16,847. Males constitute 53% of the population and females 47%. Kalanaur has an average literacy rate of 65%, higher than the national average of 59.5%: male literacy is 72%, and female literacy is 58%. In Kalanaur, 15% of the population is under 6 years of age. According to 2011 Kalanaur had population of 22,752.

Year	Population	Decadal Growth	Percentage Growth
1971	7,225	-	-
1981	12,380	+5,155	71.35
1991	14,524	+2,144	17.31
2001	16,853	+2,329	16.03
2011*	22,752	+5,899	35

== Notable people ==
- Rao Abdul Hafiz VC, War Hero and first Indian winner of Victoria Cross in World War II, charged at enemy lines in Burma
- Bharat Bhushan Batra, MLA from Rohtak in the Haryana Legislative Assembly. 2009-2014 and 2019 to present.

== Schools and colleges ==
- Swami Guru Charan Dass Sanatan Dharm Sr. Sec. School (SGDSD)
- MSIET ( Maa Saraswati Institute of Engineering & Technology ) Kalanaur, Rohtak. www.msiet.com
