= Parbhu Singh =

Indian politician (born 1916)

Member of Parliament, Rajya Sabha
- In office 1974–1980
- Constituency: Haryana

Personal details
- Born: 14 August 1916
- Party: Janata Party

Parbhu Singh (born 14 August 1916) is an Indian politician. He was a Member of Parliament, representing Haryana in the Rajya Sabha the upper house of India's Parliament as a member of the Janata Party.
