= Dariyav Khatik =

Indian politician (died 2021)

former MLA Dariyav Khatik

MLA
- In office 1991–1996
- Constituency: Jhajjar, Haryana
- In office 2000–2005

Personal details
- Born: 1945 or 1946 Haryana
- Died: 24 April 2021 (aged 75)
- Party: Bhartiya Janata Party
- Parent: Imrat Lal
- Occupation: Income from pension

Dariyav Khatik also known as Dariyav Singh Rajoura (1945/6 – 24 April 2021) was an Indian politician and former member of Jhajjar legislative assembly in 1991. He was a member of Bhartiya Janata Party.
