= Deepender Singh Hooda =

Indian politician (born 1978)

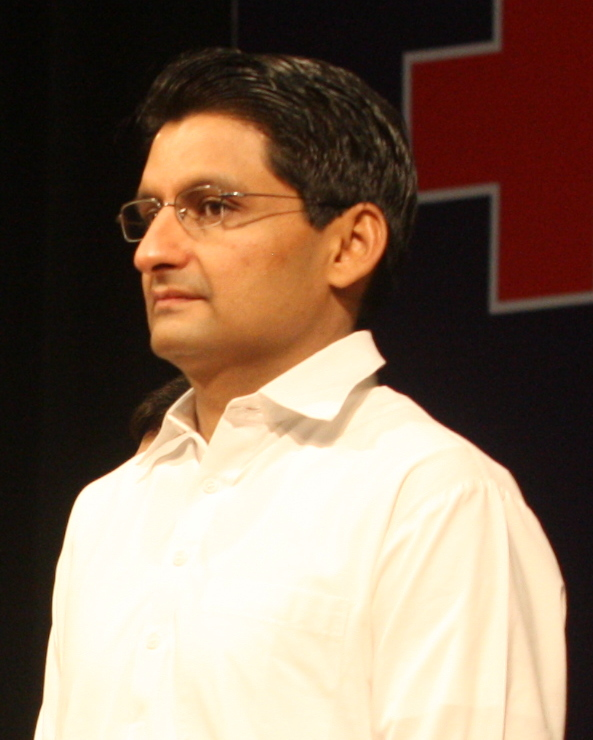
- Hooda in 2013

Member of Parliament, Lok Sabha
- Incumbent
- Assumed office 4 June 2024
- Preceded by: Arvind Kumar Sharma, BJP
- Constituency: Rohtak, Haryana
- In office 1 October 2005 – 23 May 2019
- Preceded by: Bhupinder Singh Hooda, INC
- Succeeded by: Arvind Kumar Sharma, BJP
- Constituency: Rohtak, Haryana

Member of Parliament, Rajya Sabha
- In office 10 April 2020 – 4 June 2024
- Preceded by: Selja Kumari, INC
- Succeeded by: Kiran Choudhry, BJP
- Constituency: Haryana

Personal details
- Born: 4 January 1978 (age 48) Delhi, India
- Party: Indian National Congress
- Spouse: Hemsweta Mirdha Hooda (m. 2010)
- Children: 1
- Parent: Bhupinder Singh Hooda (father)
- Occupation: Politician

Deepender Singh Hooda (born 4 January 1978) is an Indian politician. He is a five-term Member of Parliament from the Indian National Congress. He was elected as the Member of the Lok Sabha from Rohtak in 2024. He was also a Member of Parliament, Rajya Sabha from Haryana. He is a special invitee to the Congress Working Committee.

Hooda was the youngest parliamentarian when he entered politics in 2005. He writes frequently on Indian economics and international affairs in the Indian Express and other prominent publications.

== Political career ==
Hooda has served three terms as Member of Parliament in Lok Sabha from Rohtak. He was elected to the Rajya Sabha in 2020. Earlier he was elected to the Lok Sabha from Rohtak for three terms. During the 16th Lok Sabha, he was the Whip of Indian National Congress in Parliament. He served on several other statutory and parliamentary bodies in various capacities as an elected board member of the Council of Indian Institutes of Technology; as a Member of Parliamentary Standing Committee on Energy; as chairman of Indo-UK forum of Parliamentarians. In past, he has been a member of Parliamentary Standing Committees of Finance, External Affairs, Agriculture and Human Resource Development.

He is the fourth generation of his family to be in public service. His father Bhupinder Singh Hooda served as the Chief Minister of Haryana for two terms while his grandfather, Ranbir Singh Hooda, was a freedom fighter, a member of the Constituent Assembly, a member of the 1st and 2nd Lok Sabha from Rohtak, and Minister in Punjab (when Haryana was part of Punjab) and a member of Rajya Sabha. His great grandfather Choudhary Matu Ram was a social reformer and a freedom fighter who worked closely with Mahatma Gandhi.

SI No.	Year	House	Constituency	Party	Committee
1.	2005 (By Poll)	14th Lok Sabha	Rohtak	INC	Consultative Committee on External Affairs. Committee on Agriculture.
2.	2009	15th Lok Sabha	Rohtak	INC	Standing Committee on Human Resource Development. Committee on Members of Parliament Local Area Development Scheme.
3.	2014	16th Lok Sabha	Rohtak	INC	Standing Committee on Energy.
Lost the election in 2019 to BJP's Arvind Kumar Sharma.
4.	2020	Rajya Sabha	Haryana	INC	
5	2024	18th Lok Sabha	Rohtak	INC	

== Corporate career ==
He then took a break to finish his MBA at Kelley School of Business, Indiana University, where he majored in finance and strategy. After his MBA, he joined American Airlines, Sabre Holdings, Dallas, USA as a senior manager.

== Education ==
Deepender Hooda holds a Bachelor of Technology and Master of Business Administration and a bachelor's degree in law. He did his engineering from the Technological Institute of Textile & Sciences, Bhiwani. He did his MBA from Kelley School of Business at the Indiana University, Bloomington, where he majored in Finance and Strategy. At the Indiana University, he was awarded honorary Beta Gamma Sigma (top 1% of class) and was elected president of Asian Students Association at the university. During this period, he successfully led team of Asian students from the top 15 business schools in United States in holding Asian Business Conference at Harvard Business School.

He is an alumnus of Mayo College, Ajmer.

== Awards ==
- He was named as a Young Global Leader in the year 2011.
- In 2010 he received Bharat Asmita Jana Pratinidhi Shreshta award for the best young exponent of parliamentary practices for his work towards rural development through education and power generation.
- He received the Shresth Sansad Award in 2019.

== Personal life ==
Deepender Hooda married Sweta Mirdha, granddaughter of Nathuram Mirdha who is a member of the Indian National Congress in Rajasthan. Her older sister, Jyoti Mirdha, is a former Congress MP from Nagaur in Rajasthan. Sweta and Deepender have a son Kesarvir.

Hooda was earlier married to Geeta Grewal, they divorced in 2005.

== See also ==
- Dynastic politics of Haryana
