= Mukhtiar Singh Malik =

Indian politician

Mukhtiar Singh Malik (1913– 2008) was an Indian politician, a member of the Lok Sabha and Rajya Sabha from Haryana. He was a leader of Bharatiya Janata Party. He was also elected to the Haryana Legislative Assembly in the 1968 elections.
