= Shadi Lal Batra =

Indian politician

MP of Rajya Sabha for Haryana
- In office 3 April 2012 – 2 April 2018
- Succeeded by: D.P. Vats, BJP

Personal details
- Born: 2 January 1940 (age 86) Machhiwal, Jhang District, Punjab Province, British India (present-day Punjab, Pakistan)
- Party: Indian National Congress
- Spouse: Kanta Batra (m. 1965)
- Children: 3

Shadi Lal Batra (born 2 January 1940, in village Machhiwal, District Jhang (Punjab, now in Pakistan)) is the politician from Indian National Congress Party. He was elected to Rajya Sabha from state of Haryana on the ticket of INC in April 2012.

He had studied law and resides at Rohtak.
