= Rohtak district =

- District of Haryana
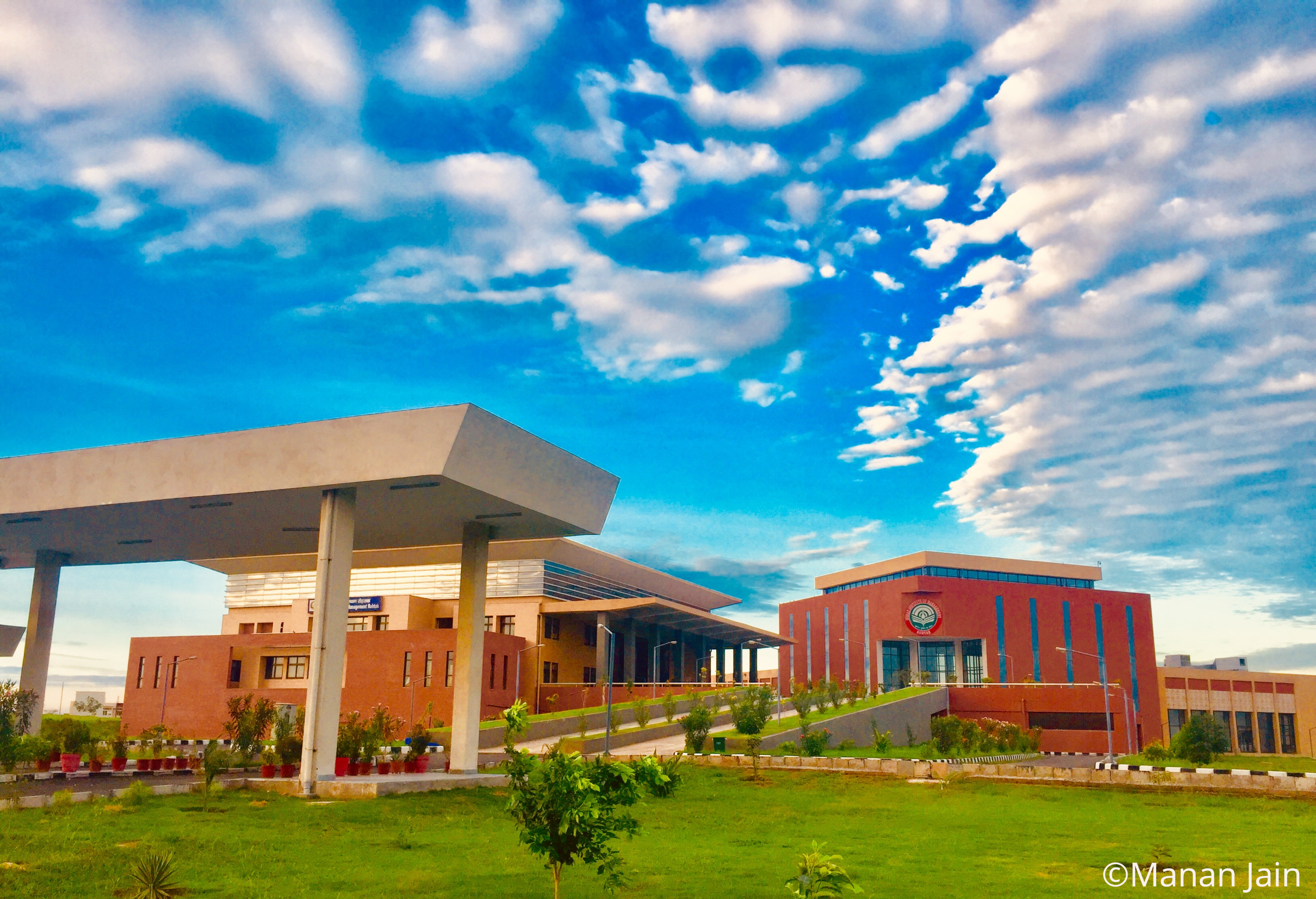
- Academic block, IIM Rohtak

- Location in Haryana
- Coordinates (Rohtak): 28.54°N 76.34°E - 28.90°N 76.57°E
- Country: India
- State: Haryana
- Division: Rohtak
- Headquarters: Rohtak
- Tehsils: 1. Rohtak, 2. Meham, 3. Kalanaur 4.Sampla

Government
  - Superintendent of Police: Sh. Udai Singh Meena, IPS
  - Lok Sabha constituencies: Rohtak
  - Vidhan Sabha constituencies: 1. Rohtak, 2. Meham, 3. Kalanaur, 4. Kiloi-Sampla

Area
  - Total: 1,745 km^{2} (674 sq mi)

Population (2011)
  - Total: 1,061,204
  - Density: 608.1/km^{2} (1,575/sq mi)
  - Urban: 35.06%

Demographics
  - Literacy: 74.56%
  - Sex ratio: 947
- Time zone: UTC+05:30 (IST)
- Major highways: NH-10, NH-71A
- Website: rohtak.nic.in

Rohtak district is a district in the Indian state of Haryana. It is located in the southeast of the state and northwest of Delhi, bounded by Jind and Sonipat districts to the north, Jhajjar and Sonipat districts to the east, and Hissar, Charkhi Dadri, and Bhiwani districts to the west. Rohtak city is the district headquarters.

== History ==
Region of the Rohtak district was annexed by the British, after the Second Anglo-Maratha War in 1803. Wreckage of an Ilyushin Il-76TD, from Kazakhstan Airlines Flight 1907, fell in Rohtak District as part of the Charkhi Dadri mid-air collision.

On 1 November 1966, when Haryana was carved out of Punjab as a separate state, Rohtak was already an existing district of newly formed state of Haryana.

== Divisions ==
The district consists of two sub-divisions, Rohtak and Meham. Rohtak tehsil is further divided into three community development blocks, Rohtak, Kalanaur and Sampla. Meham tehsil is further divided into two community development blocks, Meham and Lakhan-Majra.

=== Japanese township ===
The Japanese township is planned to be set up near Madina village, 15 kilometres (9.3 miles) from Rohtak city Ashoka, along NH9 towards Meham. It will include several big industries and commercial offices.

== Demographics ==
Historical population
Year	Pop.	±% p.a.
1901	262,040	—
1911	226,051	−1.47%
1921	243,695	+0.75%
1931	254,606	+0.44%
1941	301,394	+1.70%
1951	343,962	+1.33%
1961	433,167	+2.33%
1971	545,879	+2.34%
1981	659,644	+1.91%
1991	776,966	+1.65%
2001	940,128	+1.92%
2011	1,061,204	+1.22%

According to the 2011 census Rohtak district had a population of 1,061,204, roughly equal to the nation of Cyprus or the US state of Rhode Island. This gives it a ranking of 428th in India (out of a total of 640). The district had a population density of 607 inhabitants per square kilometre (1,570/sq mi) . Its population growth rate over the decade 2001-2011 was 12.61%. Rohtak had a sex ratio of 947 females for every 1000 males, and a literacy rate of 80.4%. Scheduled Castes make up 20.44% of the population.

Out of the total geographical area of the district, 83% is under cultivation. The main crops are wheat, gram, sugarcane and bajra. There is no perennial river in the district. However, the district has many canals.

=== Languages ===
Languages of Rohtak district (2011)
1. Haryanvi (76.9%)
2. Hindi (17.9%)
3. Punjabi (3.95%)
4. Others (1.24%)

At the time of the 2011 Census of India, 76.94% of the population in the district spoke Haryanvi, 17.87% Hindi and 3.95% Punjabi as their first language.

=== Religion ===
Religion in Rohtak district (2011)
Religion	Percent
Hinduism	98.37%
Islam	0.77%
Other or not stated	0.86%

Religion in Rohtak District
Religious group	2011	
Religious group	Pop.	%
Hinduism	1,043,887	98.37%
Islam	8,185	0.77%
Sikhism	3,916	0.37%
Christianity	732	0.07%
Others	4,484	0.42%
Total Population	1,061,204	100%

Religious groups in Rohtak District (British Punjab province era)
Religious group	1881		1891		1901		1911		1921		1931		1941	
Religious group	Pop.	%	Pop.	%	Pop.	%	Pop.	%	Pop.	%	Pop.	%	Pop.	%
Hinduism (Note: 1931-1941: Including Ad-Dharmis)	468,905	84.7%	499,957	84.67%	533,723	84.63%	450,549	83.21%	629,592	81.52%	655,963	81.42%	780,474	81.61%
Islam	79,510	14.36%	85,515	14.48%	91,687	14.54%	86,076	15.9%	125,035	16.19%	137,880	17.11%	166,569	17.42%
Jainism	5,000	0.9%	4,794	0.81%	5,087	0.81%	4,369	0.81%	7,010	0.91%	6,375	0.79%	6,847	0.72%
Sikhism	159	0.03%	154	0.03%	94	0.01%	161	0.03%	602	0.08%	596	0.07%	1,466	0.15%
Christianity	34	0.01%	55	0.01%	80	0.01%	334	0.06%	10,033	1.3%	4,807	0.6%	1,043	0.11%
Buddhism	0	0%	0	0%	0	0%	0	0%	0	0%	0	0%	0	0%
Zoroastrianism	0	0%	0	0%	0	0%	0	0%	0	0%	0	0%	0	0%
Judaism	—N/a	—N/a	0	0%	0	0%	0	0%	0	0%	0	0%	0	0%
Others	1	0%	0	0%	1	0%	0	0%	0	0%	0	0%	0	0%
Total population	553,609	100%	590,475	100%	630,672	100%	541,489	100%	772,272	100%	805,621	100%	956,399	100%
Note: British Punjab province era district borders are not an exact match in the present-day due to various bifurcations to district borders — which since created new districts — throughout the historic Punjab Province region during the post-independence era that have taken into account population increases.

Religion in the Tehsils of Rohtak District (1921)
Tehsil	Hinduism		Islam		Sikhism		Christianity		Jainism		Others (Note: Including Buddhism, Zoroastrianism, Judaism, Tribals, others, or not stated)		Total	
Tehsil	Pop.	%	Pop.	%	Pop.	%	Pop.	%	Pop.	%	Pop.	%	Pop.	%
Rohtak Tehsil	154,959	77.12%	42,368	21.09%	164	0.08%	2,081	1.04%	1,367	0.68%	0	0%	200,939	100%
Jhajjar Tehsil	189,386	88.55%	23,260	10.88%	71	0.03%	951	0.44%	198	0.09%	0	0%	213,866	100%
Gohana Tehsil	138,930	79.26%	31,013	17.69%	299	0.17%	2,458	1.4%	2,591	1.48%	0	0%	175,291	100%
Sonipat Tehsil	146,317	80.32%	28,394	15.59%	68	0.04%	4,543	2.49%	2,854	1.57%	0	0%	182,176	100%
Note: British Punjab province era tehsil borders are not an exact match in the present-day due to various bifurcations to tehsil borders — which since created new tehsils — throughout the historic Punjab Province region during the post-independence era that have taken into account population increases.

Religion in the Tehsils of Rohtak District (1941)
Tehsil	Hinduism		Islam		Sikhism		Christianity		Jainism		Others (Note: Including Anglo-Indian Christians, British Christians, Buddhism, Zoroastrianism, Judaism, Tribals, others, or not stated)		Total	
Tehsil	Pop.	%	Pop.	%	Pop.	%	Pop.	%	Pop.	%	Pop.	%	Pop.	%
Rohtak Tehsil	196,993	74.62%	64,026	24.25%	481	0.18%	243	0.09%	2,234	0.85%	7	0%	263,984	100%
Jhajjar Tehsil	230,090	88.63%	29,132	11.22%	176	0.07%	48	0.02%	174	0.07%	0	0%	259,620	100%
Gohana Tehsil	176,682	81.5%	38,136	17.59%	196	0.09%	11	0.01%	1,752	0.81%	10	0%	216,787	100%
Sonipat Tehsil	176,709	81.81%	35,275	16.33%	613	0.28%	724	0.34%	2,687	1.24%	0	0%	216,008	100%
Note1: British Punjab province era tehsil borders are not an exact match in the present-day due to various bifurcations to tehsil borders — which since created new tehsils — throughout the historic Punjab Province region during the post-independence era that have taken into account population increases. Note2: Tehsil religious breakdown figures for Christianity only includes local Christians, labeled as "Indian Christians" on census. Does not include Anglo-Indian Christians or British Christians, who were classified under "Other" category.

== Villages ==
- Assan, Rohtak
- Gandhra
- Chiri Village
- Morkheri
- Rithal

== See also ==
- Ambala
- Gochhi
