= Mohanlalganj Lok Sabha constituency =

Constituency of the Indian parliament in Uttar Pradesh

Coordinates: 26.69°N 80.98°E

Mohanlalganj UP-34
- Lok Sabha constituency
- Interactive Map Outlining Mohanlalganj Lok Sabha constituency

Constituency details
- Country: India
- Region: North India
- State: Uttar Pradesh
- Assembly constituencies: Sidhauli; Malihabad; Bakshi Kaa Talab; Sarojini Nagar; Mohanlalganj
- Established: 1962
- Reservation: SC

Member of Parliament
- 18th Lok Sabha
- Incumbent R. K. Chaudhary
- Party: Samajwadi Party
- Elected year: 2024

Mohanlalganj is a Lok Sabha parliamentary constituency in Lucknow district, Uttar Pradesh. It consists of mainly the mofussil of Lucknow city.

== Assembly segments ==
Currently, Mohanlalganj Lok Sabha constituency comprises five Vidhan Sabha (legislative assembly) segments. These are:

| No | Name | District | Member | Party | 2024 Lead |
|---|---|---|---|---|---|
| 152 | Sidhauli (SC) | Sitapur | Manish Rawat | BJP | SP |
| 168 | Malihabad (SC) | Lucknow | Jai Devi | BJP | SP |
| 169 | Bakshi Kaa Talab | Lucknow | Yogesh Shukla | BJP | BJP |
| 170 | Sarojini Nagar | Lucknow | Rajeshwar Singh | BJP | BJP |
| 176 | Mohanlalganj (SC) | Lucknow | Amresh Kumar Rawat | BJP | SP |

== Members of Parliament ==
| Year | Member | Party |
|---|---|---|
| 1962 | Ganga Devi | Indian National Congress |
| 1967 | Ganga Devi | Indian National Congress |
| 1971 | Ganga Devi | Indian National Congress |
| 1977 | Ram Lal Kureel | Janata Party |
| 1980 | Kailash Pati | Indian National Congress |
| 1984 | Jagannath Prasad | Indian National Congress |
| 1989 | Sarju Prasad Saroj | Janata Dal |
| 1991 | Chhotey Lal | Bharatiya Janata Party |
| 1996 | Purnima Verma | Bharatiya Janata Party |
| 1998 | Reena Choudhary | Samajwadi Party |
| 1999 | Reena Choudhary | Samajwadi Party |
| 2004 | Jai Prakash Rawat | Samajwadi Party |
| 2009 | Sushila Saroj | Samajwadi Party |
| 2014 | Kaushal Kishore | Bharatiya Janata Party |
| 2019 | Kaushal Kishore | Bharatiya Janata Party |
| 2024 | R. K. Chaudhary | Samajwadi Party |

== Election results ==
=== General election 1962 ===
1962 Indian general election: Mohanlalganj
| Party | Candidate | Votes | % | ±% |
|---|---|---|---|---|
| INC | Ganga Devi | 78,752 | 42.92% | N.A. |
| ABJS | Ram Baksh | 34,542 | 18.83% | N.A. |
| PSP | Jagannath Prasad | 30,481 | 16.78% | N.A. |
| Independent | Krishna Kumari | 17,869 | 9.74% | N.A. |
| Socialist | Ghanshyam | 15,616 | 8.51% | N.A. |
| SWA | Saryoo Prasad Aditya | 5,921 | 3.23% | N.A. |
| Margin of victory | | 44,210 | 24.09% | N.A. |
| Turnout | | 1,91,060 | 46.20% | N.A. |
| INC hold | | Swing | New Seat | |

=== General election 1967 ===
1967 Indian general election: Mohanlalganj
| Party | Candidate | Votes | % | ±% |
|---|---|---|---|---|
| INC | Ganga Devi | 90,283 | 41.36% | N.A. |
| ABJS | Ram Baksh | 54,479 | 24.96% | N.A. |
| CPI | A. Prasad | 33,335 | 15.27% | N.A. |
| PSP | B. Din | 22,775 | 10.43% | N.A. |
| Independent | C. Prasad | 17,433 | 7.99% | N.A. |
| Margin of victory | | 35,804 | 24.09 | N.A. |
| Turnout | | 2.26.659 | 48.48% | N.A. |
| INC hold | | Swing | N.A. | |

=== General election 1971 ===
1971 Indian general election: Mohanlalganj
| Party | Candidate | Votes | % | ±% |
|---|---|---|---|---|
| INC | Ganga Devi | 1,05,565 | 62.97% | N.A. |
| INC(O) | Khayali Ram | 46,285 | 27.61% | N.A. |
| Bharatiya Kranti Dal | Jawahar Lal Jatav | 15,793 | 9.42% | N.A. |
| Margin of victory | | 59,210 | 24.09 | N.A. |
| Turnout | | 1,71,734 | 33.49% | N.A. |
| INC hold | | Swing | N.A. | |

=== General election 1977 ===
1977 Indian general election: Mohanlalganj
| Party | Candidate | Votes | % | ±% |
|---|---|---|---|---|
| JP | Ram Lal Kureel | 2,03,445 | 76.08% | N.A. |
| INC | Ganga Devi | 47,703 | 17.84% | N.A. |
| Republican Party of India (Khobragade) | Gaya Prasad Prashant | 9,245 | 3.46% | N.A. |
| Independent | Ganga Prasad | 7,031 | 2.63% | N.A. |
| Margin of victory | | 1,56,042 | 58.24% | N.A. |
| Turnout | | 2,73,880 | 45.65% | N.A. |
| JP hold | | Swing | N.A. | |

=== General election 1980 ===
1980 Indian general election: Mohanlalganj
| Party | Candidate | Votes | % | ±% |
|---|---|---|---|---|
| INC | Kailash Pati | 1,11,819 | 44.06% | N.A. |
| JP(S) | Ram Lal Kureel | 68,754 | 27.09% | N.A. |
| JP | Kanhaiya Lal Sonkar | 63,343 | 24.96% | N.A. |
| Independent | Dhooru | 9,855 | 3.88% | N.A. |
| Margin of victory | | 43,065 | 16.97% | N.A. |
| Turnout | | 2,60,268 | 39.77% | N.A. |
| INC(I) hold | | Swing | N.A. | |

=== General election 1984 ===
1984 Indian general election: Mohanlalganj
| Party | Candidate | Votes | % | ±% |
|---|---|---|---|---|
| INC | Jagannath Prasad | 1,89,704 | 55.52% | N.A. |
| LKD | Ram Lal Kureel | 56,665 | 16.58% | N.A. |
| CPI | Bhika Lal | 40,205 | 11.77% | N.A. |
| BJP | Chaudhari Mahaveer Prasad Kureel | 18,102 | 5.30% | N.A. |
| Independent | Kalp Nath Sonkar | 13,831 | 4.05% | N.A. |
| Doordarshi Party | Baboo Lal | 6,351 | 1.86% | N.A. |
| Independent | Ram Asrey | 5,837 | 1.71% | N.A. |
| Independent | Balram Pushkar | 3,732 | 1.09% | N.A. |
| Independent | Ghanshyam | 3,3305 | 0.97% | N.A. |
| Independent | Sampati Devi Rawat | 2,049 | 0.60% | N.A. |
| Independent | Kushahar Prasad Kureel | 1,918 | 0.56% | N.A. |
| Margin of victory | | 1,33,049 | 38.94% | N.A. |
| Turnout | | 3,49,917 | 50.10% | N.A. |
| INC hold | | Swing | N.A. | |

=== General election 2009 ===
2009 Indian general elections: Mohanlalganj
| Party | Candidate | Votes | % | ±% |
|---|---|---|---|---|
| SP | Sushila Saroj | 2,56,367 | 36.93 | |
| BSP | Jai Prakash | 1,79,772 | 25.89 | |
| RSBP | R. K. Chaudhary | 1,44,341 | 20.79 | |
| BJP | Ranjan Kumar Chaudhary | 82,435 | 11.87 | |
| RCP | Jaipal Pathik | 17,082 | 2.46 | |
| Majority | | 76,595 | 11.04 | |
| Turnout | | 6,94,274 | 46.28 | |
| SP hold | | Swing | | |

=== General election 2014 ===
2014 Indian general elections: Mohanlalganj
| Party | Candidate | Votes | % | ±% |
|---|---|---|---|---|
| BJP | Kaushal Kishore | 455,274 | 40.77 | |
| BSP | R. K. Chaudhary | 3,09,858 | 27.75 | |
| SP | Sushila Saroj | 2,42,366 | 21.70 | |
| INC | Narendra Gautam | 52,598 | 4.71 | |
| AAP | Sunil Gautam | 10,031 | 0.90 | |
| NOTA | None of the Above | 4,708 | 0.42 | |
| Majority | | 1,45,416 | 13.02 | |
| Turnout | | 11,16,658 | 60.75 | |
| BJP gain from SP | | Swing | | |

=== General election 2019 ===
2019 Indian general elections: Mohanlalganj
| Party | Candidate | Votes | % | ±% |
|---|---|---|---|---|
| BJP | Kaushal Kishore | 629,999 | 49.62 | +8.85 |
| BSP | C. L. Verma | 5,39,795 | 42.52 | +14.77 |
| INC | R. K. Chaudhary | 60,069 | 4.73 | +0.02 |
| NOTA | None of the Above | 10,795 | 0.85 | +0.43 |
| Majority | | 90,204 | 7.10 | −5.92 |
| Turnout | | 12,70,580 | 62.79 | +1.99 |
| BJP hold | | Swing | | |

=== General election 2024 ===
2024 Indian general elections: Mohanlalganj
| Party | Candidate | Votes | % | ±% |
|---|---|---|---|---|
| SP | R. K. Chaudhary | 667,869 | 48.49 | ▲48.49 |
| BJP | Kaushal Kishore | 5,97,577 | 43.38 | ▼6.24 |
| BSP | Rajesh Kumar | 88,461 | 6.42 | ▼36.10 |
| NOTA | None of the Above | 8,866 | 0.64 | ▲0.21 |
| Majority | | 70,292 | 5.10 | ▼2.00 |
| Turnout | | 13,77,452 | 62.98 | ▲0.19 |
| SP gain from BJP | | Swing | | |

== See also ==
- List of constituencies of the Lok Sabha
- Sitapur district
