= Jai Prakash =

Indian politician

Jai Prakash Rawat

Member of Parliament, Lok Sabha
- Incumbent
- Assumed office 2019
- Preceded by: Anshul Verma
- Constituency: Hardoi
- In office 2004–2009
- Preceded by: Reena Choudhary
- Succeeded by: Sushila Saroj
- Constituency: Mohanlalganj
- In office 1999–2004
- Preceded by: Usha Verma
- Succeeded by: Usha Verma
- Constituency: Hardoi
- In office 1991–1998
- Preceded by: Chand Ram
- Succeeded by: Usha Verma
- Constituency: Hardoi

Member of Parliament, Rajya Sabha
- In office 4 August 2009 – 2 April 2012
- Preceded by: Balihari
- Constituency: Uttar Pradesh

Personal details
- Born: 16 April 1958 (age 68) Unnao, Uttar Pradesh, India
- Party: Bharatiya Janata Party (2018-) (till 2004)
- Other political affiliations: Samajwadi Party (2012-18) (2004-08); Bahujan Samaj Party (2008-12)
- Spouse: Jyoti Prakash (m. 1985)
- Children: 2 sons
- Parents: Jagannath Prasad (father); Vidyawati (mother)
- Education: Bachelor of Arts; Bachelor of Laws
- Alma mater: Lucknow University

Jai Prakash (born 16 April 1958), also known as Jai Prakash Rawat, is an Indian politician from Uttar Pradesh and a member of the Bhartiya Janata Party. He was re-elected in 2024 as the BJP Member of Parliament from Hardoi Lok Sabha. Having a long political career, he has won Lok Sabha elections five times and was once elected as a Rajya Sabha member.

In the 2024 Lok Sabha elections, Jai Prakash won by a margin of 27,856 against Samajwadi Party's Usha Verma in the Hardoi Lok Sabha constituency, while in the previous 2019 elections, Jai Prakash had defeated the SP candidate by a comfortable 1,32,474 votes in the same constituency.

== Early life and education ==
Jai Prakash was born in 1958 to the late Shri Jagannath Prasad and Smt Vidyawati in Unnao, Uttar Pradesh. He is a graduate who completed his bachelor in Arts and also studied law (LLB) from Lucknow University, Uttar Pradesh.

== Political career ==
He entered active politics in Uttar Pradesh, fought several Lok Sabha elections, and became a member of parliament from the Mohanlalganj Lok Sabha Constituency. Subsequently, he became the BJP candidate for the nearby Hardoi constituency in 2019.

In the 2019 Lok Sabha elections, Jai Prakash garnered 5,68,143 votes, and defeated SP's Usha Verma by a comfortable 1,32,474 votes in the Hardoi constituency. Jai Prakash was able to secure the BJP candidacy again in 2024 elections from Hardoi.

In the 2024 elections, Jai Prakash was up against a stiff challenge from the SP candidate, while the BSP candidate was also a factor in the Hardoi constituency, which has diverse demographics including an important SC community. Jai Prakash was among the few sitting BJP MPs from Uttar Pradesh who were able to retain their seats in the 2024 elections.
