= R. K. Chaudhary =

Member of 18th Lok Sabha from Mohanlalganj

R. K. Chaudhary आर. के. चौधरी

Member of Parliament, Lok Sabha
- Incumbent
- Assumed office 4 June 2024
- Preceded by: Kaushal Kishore
- Constituency: Mohanlalganj

Ex. Minister, Uttar Pradesh
- Constituency: Mohanlalganj

Personal details
- Born: Toniya, Uttar Pradesh, India
- Party: Samajwadi Party
- Education: B. Sc., L. L. B.
- Alma mater: K.S. Saket P.G. College, Avadh University
- Profession: Lawyer

R. K. Chaudhary is an Indian politician and currently serving Member of Parliament, Lok Sabha from the Mohanlalganj. He is a member of the Samajwadi Party. He served as Minister of Transport, Health, Science & Technology, Forest, Environment, Small Industry, Cooperative, Ambedkar Rural Development, Sports and Youth Welfare in the Government of Uttar Pradesh.

He was two-time Leader of the House Legislative Council UP and four-time MLA and four-time cabinet minister.

== Career ==
His political career started with the Bahujan Samaj Party under the leadership of Kanshi Ram. He is a founding member of BSP. He won the assembly seat from Manjhanpur (1993) and Mohanlalganj (1996) as an independent candidate in 2002 and 2007. In the next elections, he ran independently and lost by a small margin. He joined the Congress Party in 2019 and is seeking his first Lok Sabha election. He is known for his Ambedkarist and socialist ideas in a marginalised section of society.

In the 2024 Indian general election Chaudhary won as the Member of Parliament from the Mohanlalganj Lok Sabha constituency. RK Chaudhary defeated Union Minister and BJP candidate Kaushal Kishore from Mohanlalganj parliamentary seat by a margin of 70,292 votes.
