= Chhotey Lal =

Indian politician (1926–1995)

Member of Parliament, Lok Sabha
- In office 1991–1995
- Preceded by: Sarju Prasad Saroj
- Succeeded by: Purnima Verma
- Constituency: Mohanlalganj, Uttar Pradesh

Personal details
- Born: 17 August 1926 Allahabad, United Provinces, British India (present-day Uttar Pradesh, India)
- Died: 15 November 1995 (aged 69)
- Party: Bharatiya Janata Party

Chhotey Lal (17 August 1926 – 15 November 1995) was an Indian politician. He was elected to the Lok Sabha, the lower house of the Parliament of India from the Mohanlalganj constituency of Uttar Pradesh as a member of the Bharatiya Janata Party. Lal died on 15 November 1995, at the age of 69.
