= List of deputy chief ministers of Haryana =

De facto deputy head of government

Deputy Chief Minister of Haryana
- Hariyāṇā Kē Upamukhyamaṁtrī
- Emblem of Haryana
- Incumbent; Vacant since 12 March 2024
- Style: The Honourable
- Status: Deputy Head of Government
- Abbreviation: DCM
- Member of: Haryana Legislative Assembly
- Residence: 48, Sector 2, Chandigarh
- Seat: Chandigarh
- Appointer: Governor on the advice of the Chief Minister
- Inaugural holder: Chand Ram
- Formation: 24 March 1967

The deputy chief minister of Haryana (DCM Haryana, ISO: Hariyāṇā Kē Upamukhyamaṁtrī) is a member of the Cabinet of Government of Haryana. This is not a constitutional office, it seldom carries any specific powers. In the parliamentary system of government, the chief minister is treated as the "first among equals" in the cabinet; the position of deputy chief minister is usually but not necessarily used to bring political stability and strength within a coalition government. The position of deputy chief minister is not explicitly defined or mentioned in the Constitution of India. However, the Supreme Court of India has stated that the appointment of deputy chief ministers is not unconstitutional. The court has clarified that a deputy chief minister, for all practical purposes, remains a minister in the council of ministers headed by the chief minister and does not draw a higher salary or perks compared to other ministers.During the absence of the chief minister, the deputy-chief minister may chair cabinet meetings and lead the assembly majority. Various deputy chief ministers have also taken the oath of secrecy in line with the one that chief minister takes. This oath has also sparked controversies.

== List of deputy chief ministers of haryana ==
| Sr. No. | Name (constituency) (birth-death) | Portrait | Term of office | | | Political party | Chief Minister | Ref |
|---|---|---|---|---|---|---|---|---|
| 1 | Chand Ram (Jhajjar) (1923–2015) | | 24 March 1967 | 2 November 1967 | 223 days | Indian National Congress | Rao Birender Singh | |
Vacant (2 November 1967 - 21 June 1977)
| 2 | Mangal Sein (Rohtak) (1927–1990) | | 21 June 1977 | 28 June 1979 | 2 years, 7 days | Janata Party | Devi Lal | |
Vacant (28 June 1979 - 20 June 1987)
| 3 | Banarsi Das Gupta (Bhiwani) (1917–2007) | | 20 June 1987 | 2 December 1989 | 2 years, 165 days | Janata Dal | Devi Lal | |
| 4 | Hukam Singh (Dadri) (1926–2015) | | | | | Janata Dal | Om Prakash Chautala | |
| 5 | Chander Mohan (Kalka) (b. 1965) | | 15 March 2005 | 7 December 2008 | 3 years, 267 days | Indian National Congress | Bhupinder Singh Hooda | |
Vacant (7 December 2008 - 27 October 2019)
| 6 | Dushyant Chautala (Uchana) (b. 1988) | | 27 October 2019 | 12 March 2024 | 4 years, 137 days | Jannayak Janata Party | Manohar Lal Khattar | |
Vacant (Since 12 March 2024)

== Oath as the state deputy chief minister ==
The deputy chief minister serves five years in the office. The following is the oath of the Deputy chief minister of state:

I, <Name of Deputy Chief Minister>, do swear in the name of God/solemnly affirm that I will bear true faith and allegiance to the Constitution of India as by law established, that I will uphold the sovereignty and integrity of India, that I will faithfully and conscientiously discharge my duties as a Minister for the State of () and that I will do right to all manner of people in accordance with the Constitution and the law without fear or favour, affection or ill-will.

Oath of Secrecy

"I, [Name], do swear in the name of God / solemnly affirm that I will not directly or indirectly communicate or reveal to any person or persons any matter which shall be brought under my consideration or shall become known to me as a Minister for the State of [Name of State] except as may be required for the due discharge of my duties as such Minister."Pad ki Shapath (Oath of Office) "Main, [DCM ka Naam], Ishwar ki shapath leta hoon / satyanishtha se pratigyan karta hoon ki main vidhi dwara sthapit Bharat ke Samvidhan ke prati sachi shraddha aur nishtha rakhunga. Main Bharat ki prabhuta aur akhandta akshunn rakhunga. Main [State ka Naam] ke Rajya ke Upa Mukhya Mantri ke roop mein apne kartavyon ka shraddhapoorvak aur shuddh antahkaran se nirvahan karunga, tatha main bhay ya pakshpat, anurag ya dwesh ke bina, sabhi prakar ke logon ke prati Samvidhan aur vidhi ke anusar nyay karunga." B. Gopniyata ki Shapath (Oath of Secrecy) "Main, [DCM ka Naam], Ishwar ki shapath leta hoon / satyanishtha se pratigyan karta hoon ki jo vishay [State ka Naam] ke Rajya ke Mukhya Mantri ke roop mein mere vichar ke liye laya jayega athva mujhe gyaat hoga, use kisi vyakti ya vyaktityon ko, tab ke sivay jab ki aise UpaMukhya Mantri ke roop mein apne kartavyon ke uchit nirvahan ke liye aisa karna apekshit ho, main pratyaksh (directly) ya apratyaksh (indirectly) roop mein sansuchit ya prakat nahi karunga."

== See also ==
- List of current Indian deputy chief ministers
