= Darshana Gupta =

Indian wedding organiser

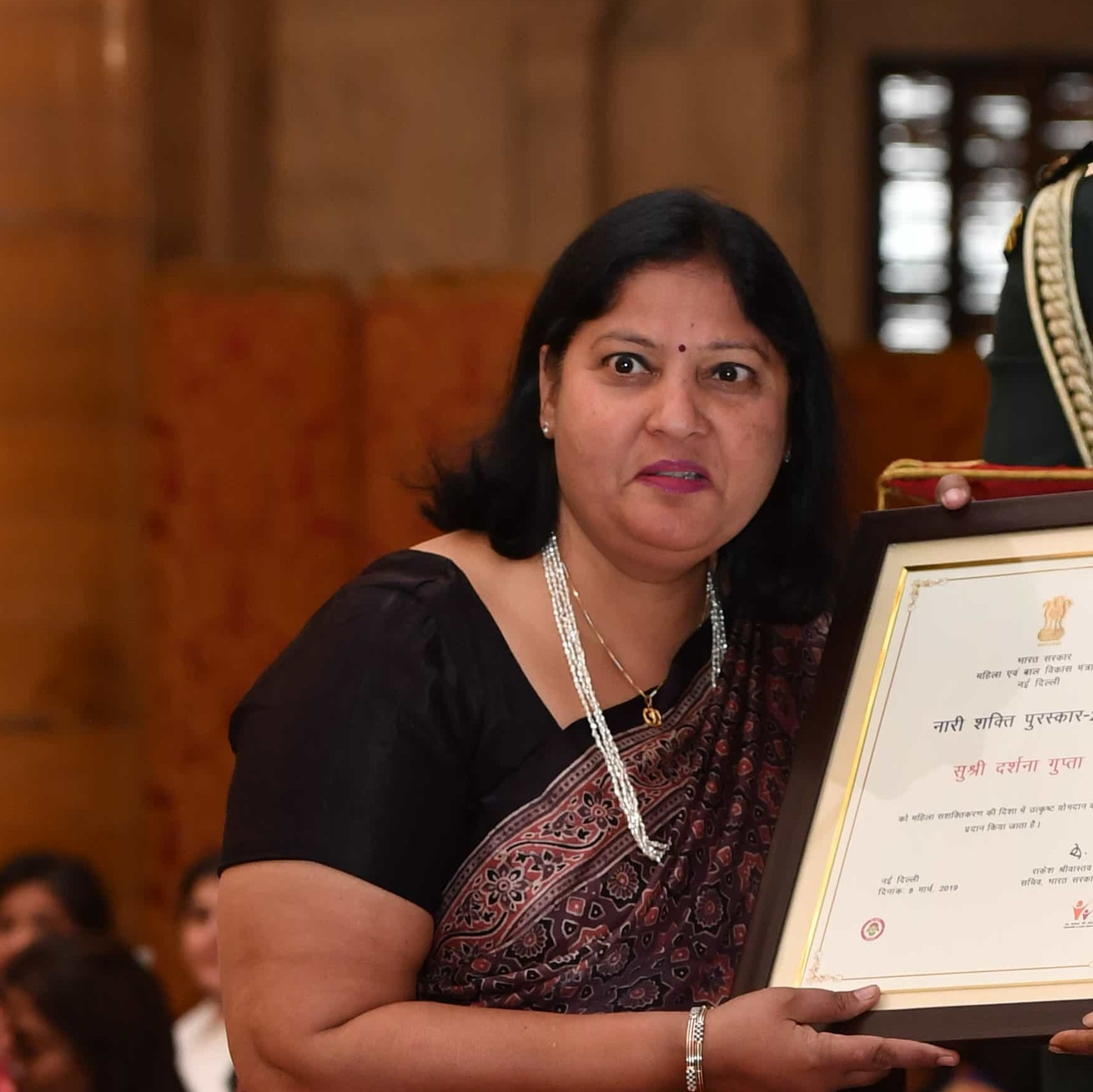
- in 2019
- Born: 20th century
- Died: 26 May 2023
- Occupation: secretary of an NGO
- Known for: organising mass weddings
- Spouse: Ajay Gupta
- Relatives: Banarsi Das Gupta (father in law)

Darshana Gupta was an Indian known for organising mass weddings. She was the secretary of the Banarsi Das Gupta Foundation. In 2019 she was awarded the Nari Shakti Puraskar by the President of India on International Women's Day having arranged the weddings of 3,500 couples who might otherwise have remained single because they could not afford a traditional grand wedding and dowry. In 2023, she died at her residence in faridabad.

== Life ==
She married Ajay Gupta who was the son of Banarsi Das Gupta. Banarsi Das Gupta died in 2007 aged 90.

That year it was announced that the Banarsi Das Gupta Foundation was to be created. It was founded by Gupta and her husband. The foundation is an NGO registered in Faridabad with Ajay Gupta as the chair, and Darshana Gupta as the secretary.

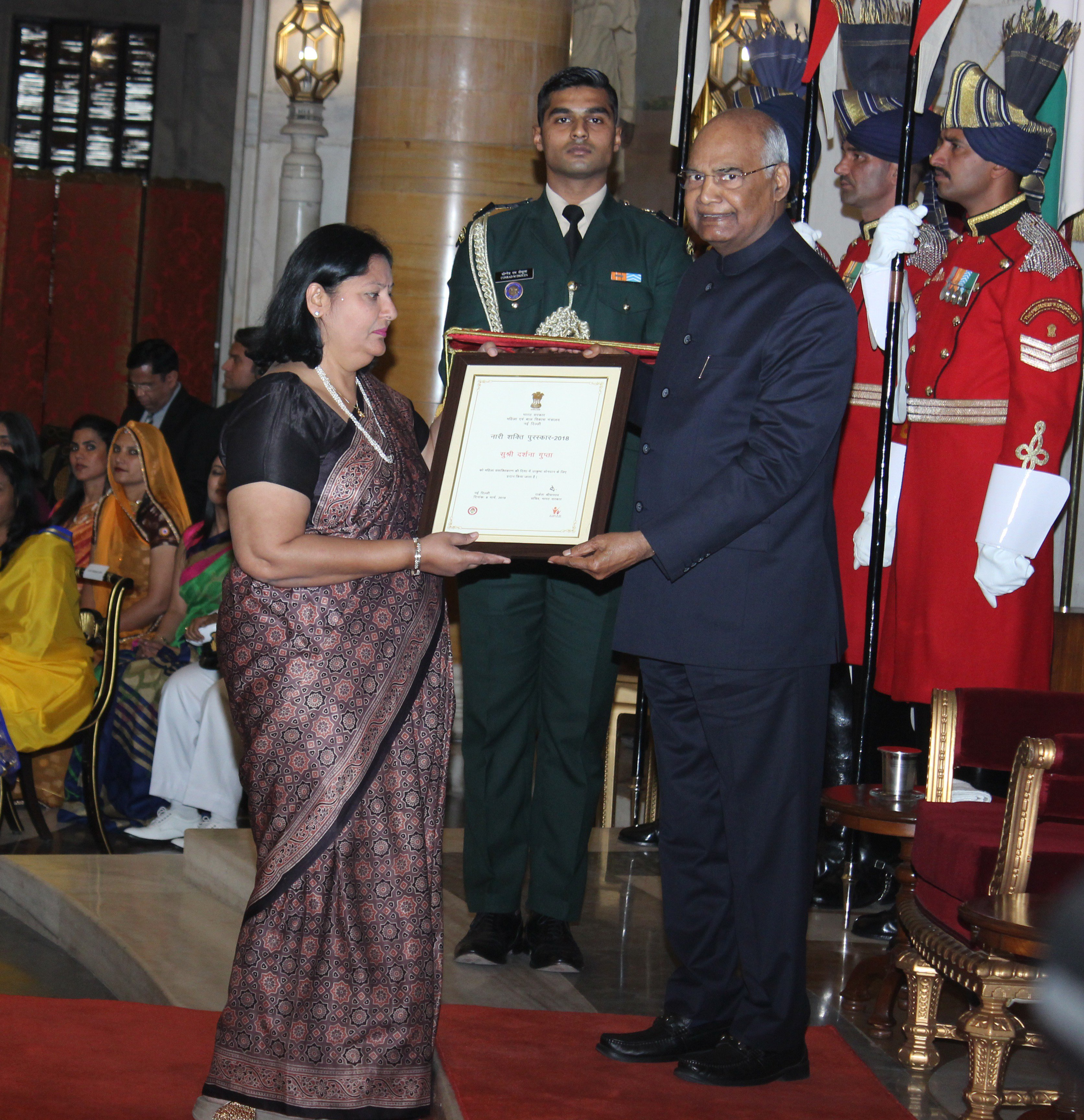
Darshana Gupta being awarded the Nari Shakti Puraskar by the President

The foundation has been addressing the problem of marriage which traditionally in India has been a grand affair involving expensive arrangements and the exchange of a dowry. These traditions result in many people not getting married despite a wish to have a partner. The foundation has arranged hundreds of weddings. The initial batch of 250 in Panchkula was so successful that the regional government decided to give each couple a grant of $R11,000.

Gupta is also an executive member of the All India Vaish Federation.

In 2019 her work was recognised when she awarded the Nari Shakti Puraskar. The award was made on International Women's Day by the President of India. The citation noted that she had arranged over 3,500 weddings for the underprivileged without regard to race, religion or colour. The money saved by not having a fancy wedding means that money can be redirected towards the education or training of the women who might have become "social victims" of they had remained single.
