= Ambrish Singh Pushkar =

Indian politician

Member of Uttar Pradesh Legislative Assembly
- In office March 2017 – March 2022
- Preceded by: Chandra Rawat
- Succeeded by: Amresh Kumar
- Constituency: Mohanlalganj

Personal details
- Born: November 28, 1974 (age 51) Lucknow
- Party: Samajwadi Party
- Parent: Sukh Lal Verma (father)
- Education: Bachelor of Laws
- Alma mater: Lucknow University
- Profession: Politician

Ambrish Singh Pushkar is an Indian politician and a member of 17th Legislative Assembly of Mohanlalganj, Uttar Pradesh of India. He represents the Mohanlalganj constituency of Uttar Pradesh.

He is a member of the Samajwadi Party.

== Political career ==
Pushkar has been a member of the 17th Legislative Assembly of Uttar Pradesh. Since 2017, he has represented the Mohanlalganj constituency and is a member of the Samajwadi Party.

== Posts held ==
#	From	To	Position	Comments
01	2017	Incumbent	Member, 17th Legislative Assembly	

== See also ==
- Uttar Pradesh Legislative Assembly
