= Anshul Verma =

Indian politician

Member of parliament Lok Sabha
- In office 16 May 2014 – 17 May 2019
- Preceded by: Usha Verma
- Succeeded by: Jai Prakash
- Constituency: Hardoi

Personal details
- Born: 18 July 1974 (age 52) Hardoi, Uttar Pradesh, India
- Party: Samajwadi Party (2019- present)
- Other political affiliations: Bhartiya Janta Party (till 2019)
- Spouse: Smt. Sharuti Verma
- Children: 1
- Parent(s): Mr Shyam Lal & Mrs Shanta Verma
- Education: Panjab University
- Occupation: Advocate
- As of 17 December, 2016

Anshul Verma (born 18 July 1974) is an Indian politician, currently with from the Samajwadi Party He had represented the Hardoi Lok Sabha constituency, from 2014 to 2019, for BJP but later quit from the party.

== Early life and education ==
Anshul Verma was born on 18 July 1974, to Shri Shyam Lal and Smt. Shanta Verma. He was born in Pushptali, Hardoi, Uttar Pradesh. His educational qualifications include M.A. (History), LL.B. and he received his education at Punjab University, Chandigarh. Anshul Verma married Sharuti Verma on 23 March 2008.

== Political career ==
- May 2014: Elected to 16th Lok Sabha
- 1 Sep. 2014 onwards: Member, Standing Committee on Personnel, Public Grievances, Law and Justice; Member, Consultative Committee, Ministry of Trade & Commerce
- 27 March 2019: left Bhartiya Janta Party and join Samajwadi Party
