= Jagannath Prasad =

Indian politician

Member of Parliament, Lok Sabha
- In office 1984-89
- Preceded by: Kailash Pati
- Succeeded by: Sarju Prasad Saroj
- Constituency: Mohanlalganj, Uttar Pradesh

Personal details
- Born: November 1921 (age 104)
- Party: Indian National Congress
- Spouse: Vidya Wati
- Profession: Politician

Jagannath Prasad was an Indian politician belonging to the Indian National Congress. He was elected to the Lok Sabha the lower house of Indian Parliament from Mohanlalganj in Uttar Pradesh in 1984.
