= Hardoi Lok Sabha constituency =

Lok Sabha Constituency in Uttar Pradesh, India

Coordinates: 27.39°N 80.14°E

Hardoi UP-31
- Lok Sabha constituency
- Interactive Map Outlining Hardoi Lok Sabha constituency

Constituency details
- Country: India
- Region: North India
- State: Uttar Pradesh
- Assembly constituencies: Sawaijpur; Shahabad; Hardoi; Gopamau; Sandi
- Established: 1952
- Reservation: None

Member of Parliament
- 18th Lok Sabha
- Incumbent Jai Prakash
- Party: Bharatiya Janata Party
- Elected year: 2024

Hardoi Lok Sabha constituency is one of the 80 Lok Sabha (parliamentary) constituencies in the Indian state of Uttar Pradesh. Jai Prakash of BJP won from the constituency in the 2024 Lok Sabha election.

== Assembly Segments ==
No	Name	District	Member	Party	2024 lead
154	Sawaijpur	Hardoi	Madhavendra Pratap	BJP	BJP
155	Shahabad	Hardoi	Rajani Tiwari	BJP	SP
156	Hardoi	Hardoi	Nitin Agrawal	BJP	BJP
157	Gopamau (SC)	Hardoi	Shyam Prakash	BJP	SP
158	Sandi (SC)	Hardoi	Prabhash Kumar	BJP	SP

== Members of Parliament ==
Year	Member	Party
1952	Bulkai Ram Verma	Indian National Congress
1957	Drohar Shivadin	Jana Sangh
1957^	Chheda Lal Gupta	Indian National Congress
1962	Kinder Lal	Indian National Congress
1967	Kinder Lal	Indian National Congress
1971	Kinder Lal	Indian National Congress
1977	Parmai Lal	Janata Party
1980	Manni Lal	Indian National Congress
1984	Kinder Lal	Indian National Congress
1989	Parmai Lal	Janata Dal
1990^	Chaudhary Chand Ram	Janata Dal
1991	Jai Prakash Rawat	Bharatiya Janata Party
1996	Jai Prakash Rawat	Bharatiya Janata Party
1998	Usha Verma	Samajwadi Party
1999	Jai Prakash Rawat	Akhil Bharatiya Loktantrik Congress
2004	Usha Verma	Samajwadi Party
2009	Usha Verma	Samajwadi Party
2014	Anshul Verma	Bharatiya Janata Party
2019	Jai Prakash Rawat	Bharatiya Janata Party
2024	Jai Prakash Rawat	Bharatiya Janata Party

^ by poll

== Election results ==
=== 2024 ===
2024 Indian general elections: Hardoi
Party	Candidate	Votes	%	±%
BJP	Jai Prakash Rawat	486,798	44.25	▼9.47
SP	Usha Verma	4,58,942	41.72	▲0.52
BSP	Bhimrao Ambedkar	1,22,629	11.15	▲11.15
NOTA	None of the Above	8,814	0.80	▼0.24
Majority		27,856	2.53	▼5.83
Turnout		11,00,116	57.58	▼0.96
BJP hold		Swing		

=== 2019 ===
2019 Indian general elections: Hardoi
Party	Candidate	Votes	%	±%
BJP	Jai Prakash	568,143	53.72	+16.67
SP	Usha Verma	4,35,669	41.20	+12.78
INC	Virendra Kumar	19,972	1.89	−0.5
NOTA	None of the Above	11,024	1.04	+0.25
Majority		132,474	8.36	
Turnout		10,57,847	58.54	+1.79
BJP hold		Swing		

=== 2014 ===
2014 Indian general elections: Hardoi
Party	Candidate	Votes	%	±%
BJP	Anshul Verma	360,501	37.05	
BSP	Shive Prasad Verma	2,79,158	28.69	
SP	Usha Verma	2,76,543	28.42	
INC	Sarvesh Kumar	23,298	2.39	
Independent	Shivekumar	4,740	0.49	
NOTA	None of the Above	7,660	0.79	
Majority		81,343	8.36	
Turnout		9,72,906	56.75	
BJP gain from SP		Swing		

== See also ==
- Hardoi district
- List of constituencies of the Lok Sabha
