= Chand Ram (politician) =

Indian politician

Chaudhary Chand Ram

Member of Parliament, Lok Sabha
- In office 1989–1991
- Preceded by: Parmai Lal
- Succeeded by: Jai Prakash
- Constituency: Hardoi
- In office 1977–1980
- Preceded by: Dalbir Singh
- Succeeded by: Chaudhary Dalbir Singh
- Constituency: Sirsa

1st Deputy Chief Minister of Haryana
- In office 24 March 1967 – 2 November 1967
- Succeeded by: Mangal Sein
- Constituency: Jhajjar

Union Minister of Shipping and Transport
- In office 1977–1980
- Prime Minister: Morarji Desai

Member of Parliament, Rajya Sabha
- In office 1983 – 09-Apr-1984
- Succeeded by: Mukhtiar Singh Malik
- Constituency: Haryana

Personal details
- Born: 23 June 1923 Rohtak district, Punjab, British India
- Died: 15 June 2015 (aged 91) Rohtak, India
- Party: Indian National Congress
- Spouse: Durga Devi
- Children: 6
- Awards: Parmanand National Award

Chaudhary Chand Ram (23 June 1923 – 15 June 2015) was an Indian politician and first Deputy Chief Minister of Haryana.

He was member of the 1st & 3rd Punjab Assembly and 1st, 2nd, 3rd & 4th Haryana Assembly of India. He also served as the member of 6th and 9th Lok Sabha.

== Early life ==
Chaudhary Chand Ram was born on 23 June 1923 in Chamar family of Kharhar, Rohtak, Haryana, (then Punjab). He did his graduation from DAV College, Lahore and Postgraduate in Economics. His family was influenced from Arya Samaj movement.

He was a champion of Dalit cause in Punjab and was a close associate of B. R. Ambedkar.

Chaudhary Chand Ram played a significant part in struggle for a separate Haryana state from Punjab.

He led the great Bir Sunarwala Dalit Land Movement and granted land to Dalits in various parts of Haryana.

== Positions held ==
Year	Description
1952 - 57	Elected to 1st Punjab Assembly: Member - Estimates Committee (1952- 1957); Deputy Minister - Panchayat & Welfare (1956- 1957)
1958 - 62	Elected to Punjab Legislative Council: Deputy Chairman Punjab Legislative Council (1958- 1962); Chairman of Haryana Vikas Committee
1962 - 66	Elected to 3rd Punjab Assembly: Minister of State - Panchayat & Welfare (1962); Cabinet Minister (1965- 1966)
1966 - 67	Elected to 1st Haryana Assembly
1967 - 68	Elected to 2nd Haryana Assembly: Deputy Chief Ministers of Haryana
1968 - 72	Elected to 3rd Haryana Assembly: Chairman - Committee on Subordinate Legislation (1968- 1972)
1977 - 77	President of Haryana Bhartiya Lok Dal Elected to 4th Haryana Assembly
1977 - 80	Elected to 6th Lok Sabha: Union Minister of Shipping and Transport
1983 - 84	Elected to Rajya Sabha
1990 - 91	Elected to 9th Lok Sabha: Member - Consultative Committee Ministry of Defence

He was conferred with Babu Parmanand National Award in 2013.

He died on 15 June 2015, aged 92.

Lok Sabha
Preceded by Chaudhary Dalbir Singh	Member of Parliament for Sirsa; 1977 – 1980	Succeeded by Chaudhary Dalbir Singh
Preceded by Parmai Lal	Member of Parliament for Hardoi; 1990 – 1991	Succeeded by Jai Prakash
Rajya Sabha
Preceded by Sujan Singh	Member of Parliament for Rajya Sabha (Haryana); 1983 – 1984	Succeeded by NA
