= Natwar Goyal =

Indian politician

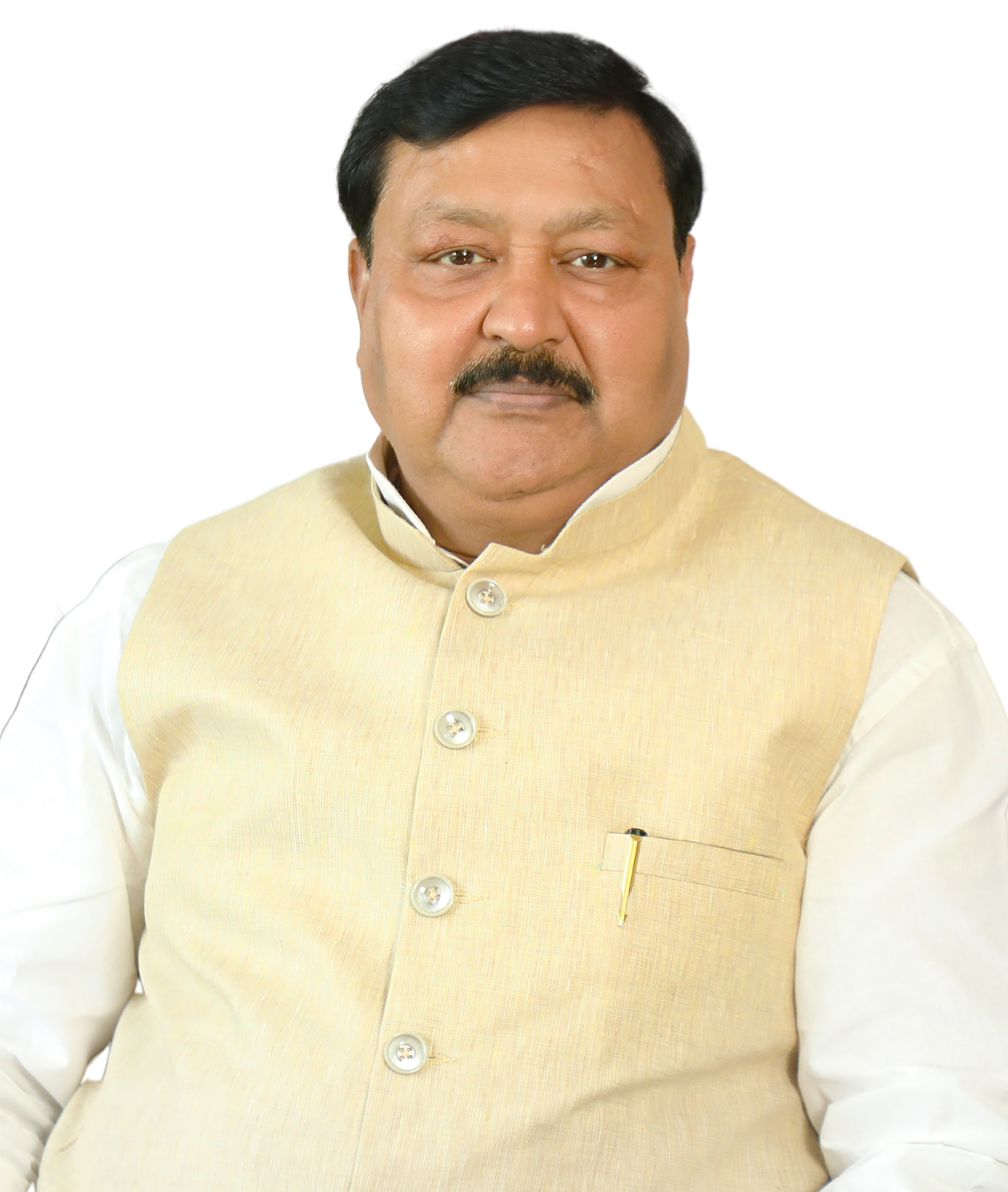

Minister of State
- Incumbent
- Assumed office 2012

Personal details
- Born: 17 August 1967 (age 58)
- Parent: Jagannath Das Agrawal (father)
- Occupation: Politician
- Website: natwargoyal.com

Natwar Goyal is an Indian politician and former state minister of Uttar Pradesh. He is the current vice president of All India Vaish Federation. Goyal is a former chairperson of Khadi Gram Udyog.

== Political career ==
Natwar Goyal has started his political career in 2011 with Samajwadi Party. He was appointed as Minister of State of Uttar Pradesh Khadi Gram Udyog in 2012 by the party.

He was elected as Uttar Pradesh vice president of All India Vaish Federation in 2012. After serving ten years with the organization Goyal is re-elected as vice president of All India Vaish Federation in 2022.

== Controversy ==
In 2016, Goyal was arrested on the charge of attacking a journalist with criminal intentions. He was also suspended from the post of Minister of State in the Uttar Pradesh government by UP chief minister Akhilesh Yadav at that time.
