= Bahrauli =

Village in Uttar Pradesh, India

- Village
- Location in Uttar Pradesh, India Bahrauli (India)
- Coordinates: 26.69029°N 81.18521°E
- Country: India
- State: Uttar Pradesh
- District: Lucknow

Area
  - Total: 4.504 km^{2} (1.739 sq mi)
- Elevation: 116 m (381 ft)

Population (2011)
  - Total: 5,674
  - Density: 1,260/km^{2} (3,263/sq mi)

Languages
  - Official: Hindi
- Time zone: UTC+5:30 (IST)

Bahrauli is a village in Gosainganj block of Lucknow district, Uttar Pradesh, India. In 2011, its population was 5,674 in 1,092 households. It is the seat of a gram panchayat.

== History ==
Around the turn of the 20th century, Bahrauli was described as a large village on the eastern border of the pargana of Mohanlalganj, bordering Haidergarh pargana in Barabanki district. The population was 2,016, most of whom were hinduss. The hindu's had formerly been the landowners here but their lands were confiscated by the British for supporting 1857 uprising. At the time, the village was held by the Maharaja of Ayodhya. Bahrauli hosted a weekly market then, and it had a lower primary school.
