= Malihabad Assembly constituency =

Constituency of the Uttar Pradesh legislative assembly in India

Coordinates: 26.92°N 80.71°E

Malihabad
- Constituency No. 168 for the Uttar Pradesh Legislative Assembly

Constituency details
- Country: India
- Region: North India
- State: Uttar Pradesh
- District: Lucknow
- Total electors: 3,60,275
- Reservation: SC

Member of Legislative Assembly
- 18th Uttar Pradesh Legislative Assembly
- Incumbent Jai Devi
- Party: BJP
- Elected year: 2022

Malihabad is a constituency of the Uttar Pradesh Legislative Assembly covering the city of Malihabad in the Lucknow district of Uttar Pradesh, India. It is one of five assembly constituencies in the Mohanlalganj Lok Sabha constituency.

Currently this seat is represented by Bharatiya Janata Party candidate Jai Devi, who won in the 2022 Uttar Pradesh Legislative Assembly election.

== Members of the Legislative Assembly ==
Year	Member	Party
1957	Ram Pal Trivedi	Indian National Congress
1962	Ram Pal Trivedi	Indian National Congress
1967	Basant Lal	Indian National Congress
1969	Basant Lal	Indian National Congress
1974	Kailash Pati	Indian National Congress
1977	Man Singh Azad	Janata Party
1980	Baijnath Kureel	Indian National Congress (I)
1985	Krishna Rawat	Indian National Congress
1989	Jagdish Chandra	Janata Dal
1991	Ashok Kumar	Janata Party
1993	Gauri Shankar	Samajwadi Party
1996	Gauri Shankar	Samajwadi Party
2002	Kaushal Kishore	Independent
2007	Gauri Shankar	Samajwadi Party
2009^	Siddharth Shanker	Bahujan Samaj Party
2012	Indal Kumar	Samajwadi Party
2017	Jai Devi	Bharatiya Janata Party
2022	Jai Devi	Bharatiya Janata Party

== Election results ==
=== 2027 ===
2027 Uttar Pradesh Legislative Assembly election: Malihabad
Party	Candidate	Votes	%	±%
INDIA				
NDA				
BSP				
NOTA	None of the above			
Majority				
Turnout				
gain from		Swing		

=== 2022 ===
2022 Uttar Pradesh Legislative Assembly Election: Malihabad
Party	Candidate	Votes	%	±%
BJP	Jai Devi	106,372	44.15	+2.57
SP	Surendra Kumar	98,627	40.93	+9.31
BSP	Jagdish Rawat	25,914	10.76	−12.73
NOTA	None of the above	1,478	0.61	−0.14
Majority		7,745	3.22	−6.74
Turnout		240,941	66.88	+0.0
BJP hold		Swing		

=== 2017 ===
U. P. Legislative Assembly Election, 2017: Malihabad
Party	Candidate	Votes	%	±%
BJP	Jai Devi	94,677	41.58	
SP	Rajbala Rawat	72,009	31.62	
BSP	Satya Kumar Gautam	53,481	23.49	
NOTA	None of the above	1,692	0.75	
Majority		22,668	9.96	
Turnout		227,724	66.88	
BJP gain from SP		Swing		

=== 2012 ===
U. P. Legislative Assembly Election, 2012: Malihabad
Party	Candidate	Votes	%	±%
SP	Indal Kumar	62,782	31.17	
RCP	Kaushal Kishore	60,567	30.07	
BSP	Dr. Siddharth Shanker	53,550	26.59	
INC	Dr. Jagdish Chandra	5,427	2.69	
PECP	Sangita kumari	4,039	2.01	
BJP	Rajesh Kumar	3,300	1.64	
Majority		2,215	1.10	
Turnout		2,01,417	65.35	
SP win (new seat)				
