= Bhiwani Assembly constituency =

Constituency of the Haryana legislative assembly in India

Coordinates: 28.80°N 76.14°E

- Constituency No. 57 for the Haryana Legislative Assembly

Constituency details
- Country: India
- Region: North India
- State: Haryana
- District: Bhiwani
- Lok Sabha constituency: Bhiwani–Mahendragarh
- Established: 1967
- Total electors: 2,36,980
- Reservation: None

Member of Legislative Assembly
- 15th Haryana Legislative Assembly
- Incumbent Ghanshyam Saraf
- Party: BJP
- Elected year: 2024

Bhiwani Assembly constituency is one of the 90 constituencies of the Haryana Legislative Assembly in Haryana state in northern India.

== Overview ==
Bhiwani (constituency number 57) is one of the 6 Assembly constituencies located in Bhiwani district. This constituency covers the entire Bhiwani town and neighbouring villages.

Bhiwani is part of Bhiwani-Mahendragarh Lok Sabha constituency along with eight other Assembly segments, namely, Dadri, Badhra, Tosham and Loharu in this district and Ateli, Mahendragarh, Narnaul and Nangal Chaudhry in Mahendragarh district.

== Members of Legislative Assembly ==
Year	Member	Party
1967	Bhagwan Dev	Bharatiya Jana Sangh
1968	Banarsi Das Gupta	Indian National Congress
1972	Banarsi Das Gupta	Indian National Congress
1977	Bir Singh	Janata Party
1982	Sagar Ram Gupta	Indian National Congress
1987	Banarsi Das Gupta	Lok Dal
1991	Ram Bhajan Agrawal	Haryana Vikas Party
1996	Ram Bhajan Agrawal	Haryana Vikas Party
2000	Chaudhary Bansilal	Haryana Vikas Party
2005	Shiv Shankar Bhardwaj	Indian National Congress
2009	Ghanshyam Saraf	Bhartiya Janata Party
2014	Ghanshyam Saraf	Bhartiya Janata Party
2019	Ghanshyam Saraf	Bhartiya Janata Party
2024	Ghanshyam Saraf	Bhartiya Janata Party

== Election results ==
=== Assembly Election 2024 ===
2024 Haryana Legislative Assembly election: Bhiwani
Party	Candidate	Votes	%	±%
BJP	Ghanshyam Saraf	67,087	46.19	▼1.21
CPI(M)	Om Prakash	34,373	23.66	New
AAP	Indu	17,573	12.10	New
Independent	Abhijeet Lal Singh	15,810	10.88	New
Independent	Priya Asija	3,660	2.52	New
Independent	Rajeev	1,825	1.26	New
RBSP	Pawan Fouji	1,339	0.92	New
NOTA	None of the Above	464	0.32	▼0.28
Margin of victory		32,714	22.52	▲1.10
Turnout		1,45,254	61.41	▲1.40
Registered electors		2,36,980		▲9.02
BJP hold		Swing	▼1.21	

=== Assembly Election 2019 ===
2019 Haryana Legislative Assembly election: Bhiwani
Party	Candidate	Votes	%	±%
BJP	Ghanshyam Saraf	61,704	47.40	▲9.06
JJP	Dr. Shiv Shanker Bhardwaj	33,820	25.98	New
INC	Amar Singh Haluwasia	18,682	14.35	▲4.49
BSP	Amit Balmiki	8,012	6.15	▲4.67
LSP	Aman Tanwar Raghav	1,785	1.37	New
INLD	Anil Kathpalia	1,228	0.94	▼15.48
NOTA	Nota	777	0.60	New
SUCI(C)	Raj Kumar Basia	712	0.55	New
Swaraj India	Rajender Singh Yadav	706	0.54	New
Independent	Dinesh Urf Lala Pahalwan	671	0.52	New
Margin of victory		27,884	21.42	▼0.50
Turnout		1,30,190	60.00	▼11.14
Registered electors		2,16,968		▲18.31
BJP hold		Swing	▲9.06	

=== Assembly Election 2014 ===
2014 Haryana Legislative Assembly election: Bhiwani
Party	Candidate	Votes	%	±%
BJP	Ghanshyam Saraf	50,020	38.34	▲9.9
INLD	Nirmla Saraf	21,423	16.42	▼2.53
HJCPV	Dr. Shiv Shankar Bhardwaj	17,018	13.04	New
INC	Ram Pratap Sharma	12,866	9.86	▼15.82
Independent	Maman Chand	9,773	7.49	New
Independent	Paramjeet Singh Maddu	2,635	2.02	New
Smast Bhartiya Party	Neelam Aggarwal	2,150	1.65	New
BSP	Pradeep Kaushik	1,939	1.49	▼1.61
CPI(M)	Comrade Vinod Kumar	1,696	1.30	New
Independent	Ramesh Verma	1,361	1.04	New
Independent	Dr. Ranvir Singh	1,318	1.01	New
Margin of victory		28,597	21.92	▲19.17
Turnout		1,30,477	71.14	▲5.27
Registered electors		1,83,396		▲25.65
BJP hold		Swing	▲9.90	

=== Assembly Election 2009 ===
2009 Haryana Legislative Assembly election: Bhiwani
Party	Candidate	Votes	%	±%
BJP	Ghanshyam Saraf	27,337	28.43	▲0.77
INC	Dr. Shiv Shanker Bhardwaj	24,692	25.68	▼27.25
INLD	Vasudev Sharma	18,217	18.95	▲6.53
Independent	Paramjeet Singh Maddu	5,731	5.96	New
Independent	Bishamber	5,175	5.38	New
Independent	Om Parkash Mann	4,229	4.40	New
BSP	Ravi Shankar	2,977	3.10	▲1.12
HJC(BL)	Kusum Sharma	2,806	2.92	New
Independent	Ramesh Verma	1,478	1.54	New
Independent	Virender Kumar Kirori	896	0.93	New
Margin of victory		2,645	2.75	▼22.51
Turnout		96,144	65.87	▼0.34
Registered electors		1,45,957		▲12.00
BJP gain from INC		Swing	▼24.50	

=== Assembly Election 2005 ===
2005 Haryana Legislative Assembly election: Bhiwani
Party	Candidate	Votes	%	±%
INC	Dr. Shiv Shanker Bhardwaj	45,675	52.93	▲17.82
BJP	Ghanshyam Saraf	23,874	27.67	▲21.61
INLD	Vasudev Sharma	10,713	12.42	New
BSP	Ramesh Verma	1,702	1.97	▼4.8
Independent	Hans Raj	1,107	1.28	New
SP	Dr. Hargian Singh	832	0.96	▲0.2
Independent	Shankar Dass	584	0.68	New
Independent	Rajkumar	571	0.66	New
Margin of victory		21,801	25.26	▲13.99
Turnout		86,290	66.21	▲4.40
Registered electors		1,30,320		▲12.55
INC gain from HVP		Swing	▲6.55	

=== Assembly Election 2000 ===
2000 Haryana Legislative Assembly election: Bhiwani
Party	Candidate	Votes	%	±%
HVP	Bansi Lal	33,199	46.39	▼12.82
INC	Vasudev Sharma	25,130	35.11	▲8.94
BSP	Anil Kumar	4,844	6.77	New
BJP	Rishi Ram	4,335	6.06	New
CPI(M)	Kulbhushan Arya	788	1.10	New
Independent	Sajjan Khangwal	641	0.90	New
SP	Ramesh Chander	546	0.76	New
JD(U)	Suresh Kumar	373	0.52	New
Independent	Jai Kumar	369	0.52	New
Margin of victory		8,069	11.27	▼21.75
Turnout		71,572	61.94	▼1.97
Registered electors		1,15,785		▼1.94
HVP hold		Swing	▼12.82	

=== Assembly Election 1996 ===
1996 Haryana Legislative Assembly election: Bhiwani
Party	Candidate	Votes	%	±%
HVP	Ram Bhajan	44,584	59.20	▲12.05
INC	Shiv Kumar S/O Kedar Nath	19,712	26.17	▲13.48
AIIC(T)	Shiv Shankar	6,488	8.62	New
SAP	Ram Singh Verma	1,028	1.37	New
JD	Bala Ram	944	1.25	New
Independent	Hans Raj	410	0.54	New
Margin of victory		24,872	33.03	▼0.53
Turnout		75,310	65.13	▲6.63
Registered electors		1,18,078		▲8.26
HVP hold		Swing	▲12.05	

=== Assembly Election 1991 ===
1991 Haryana Legislative Assembly election: Bhiwani
Party	Candidate	Votes	%	±%
HVP	Ram Bhajan	29,390	47.15	New
Independent	Shiv Kumar S/O Kadar Nath	8,472	13.59	New
INC	Ramesh Chander	7,910	12.69	▼10.38
BJP	Ajit	7,458	11.97	New
JP	Sohan Lal	4,404	7.07	New
Independent	Uashu Dev	2,139	3.43	New
Independent	Partap Singh	753	1.21	New
Margin of victory		20,918	33.56	▼17.35
Turnout		62,330	58.77	▼16.14
Registered electors		1,09,073		▲15.62
HVP gain from LKD		Swing	▼26.82	

=== Assembly Election 1987 ===
1987 Haryana Legislative Assembly election: Bhiwani
Party	Candidate	Votes	%	±%
LKD	Banarsi Das Gupta	51,137	73.97	New
INC	Shiv Kumar	15,946	23.07	▼25.19
Independent	Rajender Tanwar	515	0.74	New
VHP	Ram Singh Verma	353	0.51	New
Independent	Dev Raj	288	0.42	New
Margin of victory		35,191	50.91	▲39.36
Turnout		69,129	74.37	▲8.31
Registered electors		94,335		▲19.77
LKD gain from INC		Swing	▲25.71	

=== Assembly Election 1982 ===
1982 Haryana Legislative Assembly election: Bhiwani
Party	Candidate	Votes	%	±%
INC	Sagar Ram Gupta	24,697	48.26	▲24.19
BJP	Ramesh Chander	18,789	36.71	New
Independent	Bhale Ram	1,684	3.29	New
CPI	Harish Chander	1,593	3.11	New
JP	Narinder Kumar	980	1.91	▼36.89
Independent	Shri Niwas Urf Ram Niwas	886	1.73	New
Independent	Shimbhu Dayal	697	1.36	New
Independent	Ram Singh Verma	347	0.68	New
Independent	Shashi Bhushan	329	0.64	New
Independent	Balbir	316	0.62	New
Margin of victory		5,908	11.54	▲5.42
Turnout		51,176	65.77	▲0.93
Registered electors		78,766		▲9.21
INC gain from JP		Swing	▲9.45	

=== Assembly Election 1977 ===
1977 Haryana Legislative Assembly election: Bhiwani
Party	Candidate	Votes	%	±%
JP	Bir Singh	17,923	38.80	New
Independent	Sagar Ram Gupta	15,092	32.68	New
INC	Banarsi Das Gupta	11,116	24.07	▼12.86
Independent	Maman Chand	1,084	2.35	New
SUCI(C)	Ganpat Ram	589	1.28	New
Margin of victory		2,831	6.13	▲0.42
Turnout		46,188	64.69	▼7.71
Registered electors		72,124		▲18.37
JP gain from INC		Swing	▲1.88	

=== Assembly Election 1972 ===
1972 Haryana Legislative Assembly election: Bhiwani
Party	Candidate	Votes	%	±%
INC	Banarsi Das Gupta	16,144	36.93	▼9.6
Independent	Sagar Ram Gupta	13,650	31.22	New
ABJS	Bhagwan Dev	11,868	27.15	▼15.31
Independent	Satya Narain	769	1.76	New
Independent	Ram Mij Dass	746	1.71	New
Independent	Bajrang Dass	322	0.74	New
Independent	Phitan Lal	219	0.50	New
Margin of victory		2,494	5.70	▲1.63
Turnout		43,718	73.29	▲17.36
Registered electors		60,933		▲13.61
INC hold		Swing	▼9.60	

=== Assembly Election 1968 ===
1968 Haryana Legislative Assembly election: Bhiwani
Party	Candidate	Votes	%	±%
INC	Banarsi Das Gupta	13,572	46.53	▲8.57
ABJS	Bhagwan Dev	12,384	42.46	▼7.29
CPI	Makhan Singh	1,837	6.30	▲0.23
Independent	Brahm Datt	734	2.52	New
Independent	Mahabir Singh	480	1.65	New
Independent	Radha Krishan	161	0.55	New
Margin of victory		1,188	4.07	▼7.71
Turnout		29,168	55.61	▼15.67
Registered electors		53,634		▲6.25
INC gain from ABJS		Swing	▼3.21	

=== Assembly Election 1967 ===
1967 Haryana Legislative Assembly election: Bhiwani
Party	Candidate	Votes	%	±%
ABJS	Bhagwan Dev	17,591	49.74	New
INC	Sagar Ram Gupta	13,423	37.96	New
CPI	M. Singh	2,147	6.07	New
SSP	P. Nand	1,041	2.94	New
RPI	S. Singh	476	1.35	New
Independent	B. Ram	324	0.92	New
Independent	P. Singh	280	0.79	New
Independent	H. Singh	47	0.13	New
Independent	G. R. A. Goliwala	35	0.10	New
Margin of victory		4,168	11.79	
Turnout		35,364	72.60	
Registered electors		50,480		
ABJS win (new seat)				

== See also ==
- Bhiwani
