= Mohanlalganj Assembly constituency =

Constituency of the Uttar Pradesh legislative assembly in India

Coordinates: 26.69°N 80.98°E

Mohanlalganj
- Constituency No. 176 for the Uttar Pradesh Legislative Assembly

Constituency details
- Country: India
- Region: North India
- State: Uttar Pradesh
- District: Lucknow
- Total electors: 3,63,044
- Reservation: SC

Member of Legislative Assembly
- 18th Uttar Pradesh Legislative Assembly
- Incumbent Amresh Kumar
- Party: Bharatiya Janata Party
- Elected year: 2022

Mohanlalganj is a constituency of the Uttar Pradesh Legislative Assembly covering the city of Mohanlalganj in the Lucknow district of Uttar Pradesh, India.

Mohanlalganj is one of five assembly constituencies in the Mohanlalganj Lok Sabha constituency. Since 2008, this assembly constituency is numbered 176 amongst 403 constituencies.

== Members of Legislative Assembly ==
Year	Member	Party
1952	Mahabir Prasad	Indian National Congress
1957	Khayali Ram	Praja Socialist Party
1957	Ram Saran Yadav	Praja Socialist Party
1962	Ram Shanker Ravidasi	Indian National Congress
1964^	Khayali Ram	Praja Socialist Party
1967	Narain Das	Indian National Congress
1969	Narain Das	Indian National Congress
1974	Narain Das	Indian National Congress
1977	Sant Bux Rawat	Janata Party
1980	Sant Bux Rawat	Janata Party (Secular)
1985	Tara Chand Sonkar	Indian National Congress
1989	Sant Bux Rawat	Janata Dal
1991	Sant Bux Rawat	Janata Party
1993	Sant Bux Rawat	Samajwadi Party
1996	R. K. Chaudhary	Bahujan Samaj Party
2002	R. K. Chaudhary	Rashtriya Swabhiman Party
2007	R. K. Chaudhary	Rashtriya Swabhiman Party
2012	Chandra Rawat	Samajwadi Party
2017	Ambrish Singh Pushkar	Samajwadi Party
2022	Amresh Kumar	Bharatiya Janata Party

== Election results ==
=== 2027 ===
2027 Uttar Pradesh Legislative Assembly election: Mohanlalganj
Party	Candidate	Votes	%	±%
INDIA				
NDA				
BSP				
NOTA	None of the above			
Majority				
Turnout				
gain from		Swing		

=== 2022 ===
2022 Uttar Pradesh Legislative Assembly election: Mohanlalganj
Party	Candidate	Votes	%	±%
BJP	Amresh Kumar	107,089	43.58	
SP	Sushila Saroj	90,541	36.84	▲4.68
BSP	Devendra Kumar	31,623	12.87	▼19.05
AAP	Suraj Kumar	7,058	2.87	
INC	Mamta Choudhary	2,990	1.22	
NOTA	None of the above	2,313	0.94	▼0.64
Majority		16,548	6.74	▲6.5
Turnout		245,742	67.69	▲2.45
BJP gain from SP		Swing		

=== 2017 ===
Samajwadi Party candidate Ambrish Singh Pushkar (Advocate) won in last Assembly election of 2017 Uttar Pradesh Legislative Elections defeating Bahujan Samaj Party candidate Rambahadur Rawat retired I.A.S. officer of U.P. cadre by a margin of 530 votes.* Ambrish Singh Pushkar (SP) : 71,574 votes* Ram Bahadur (BSP) : 71,044

2017 Uttar Pradesh Legislative Assembly Election: Mohanlalgan
Party	Candidate	Votes	%	±%
SP	Ambrish Singh Pushkar	71,574	32.16	
BSP	Ram Bahadur	71,044	31.92	
Independent	R.K. Chaudhary	55,684	25.02	
Independent	Ajay Pushpa Rawat	9,464	4.25	
Independent	Shrawan Kumar	3,406	1.53	
NOTA	None of the above	3,471	1.58	
Majority		530	0.24	
Turnout		222,570	65.24	

=== 1964 bypoll ===
- Khyali Ram (PSP) : 10,759 votes
- Prabhoo Dayal (Jana Sangh) : 9,442

=== 1962 ===
- Ram Shanker Ravivasi (INC) : 8,913 votes
- Khyali Ram (PSP) : 8,888 votes
