= Madhvendra Pratap Singh =

Indian politician

Member of 17th Uttar Pradesh Legislative Assembly
- In office March 2017 – March 2022
- Preceded by: Padamrag Singh Yadav
- Succeeded by: Self – established seat
- Constituency: Sawaijpur

Member of 18th Uttar Pradesh Legislative Assembly
- Incumbent
- Assumed office March 2022
- Preceded by: Padamrag Singh Yadav

Personal details
- Born: 25 October 1973 (age 52) Sawayajpur, Uttar Pradesh, India
- Party: Bharatiya Janata Party
- Spouse: Shailza Singh
- Children: 1 son 1 daughter
- Parent: Bhagwan Bakhs Singh (father)
- Education: Graduate
- Profession: Politician; Agriculturist

Kunwar Madhvendra Pratap Ranu, also known as Madhvendra Pratap Singh, is an Indian politician who is currently serving as a member of the 18th Uttar Pradesh Legislative Assembly representing Sawaijpur Assembly constituency, and the party member of the Bharatiya Janata Party.

== Early life and education ==
Singh was born to Bhagwan Bakhs Singh in 1973.

Singh has graduated from KA College, Kasganj under Agra University, and his occupation is agriculturist in addition to politician.

== Personal life ==
Singh was married to Shailza Singh in year 1998 and Singh has 1 son and 1 daughter.

== Political career ==
Singh previously served as the first-time MLA representing Sawaijpur Assembly constituency from the 17th Uttar Pradesh Legislative Assembly.

In the 2017 Uttar Pradesh Legislative Assembly election; Madhvendra Pratap Ranu of the Bharatiya Janata Party won the seat by defeating Padmaraj Singh Pammu of the Samajwadi Party with a margin of 26,970 votes.

In the 2022 Uttar Pradesh Legislative Assembly election; Madhvendra Pratap Ranu of the Bharatiya Janata Party won the seat by defeating Padmaraj Singh Pammu of the Samajwadi Party with a margin of 25,687 votes.
