= Manni Lal =

Indian politician

Member of Parliament, Lok Sabha
- In office 1980-1984
- Preceded by: Parmai Lal
- Succeeded by: Kinder Lal
- Constituency: Hardoi, Uttar Pradesh

Personal details
- Born: 31 July 1942 Hardoi district, United Provinces, British India
- Party: Indian National Congress
- Spouse: Shanti Devi
- Children: 3 sons and 2 daughters

Manni Lal is an Indian politician. He was elected to the Lok Sabha, the lower house of the Parliament of India from Hardoi, Uttar Pradesh in 1980 as a member of the Indian National Congress.
