= Punjab Legislative Council =

- Punjab

Type
- Type: Upper house
- Term limits: 6 years

History
- Established: 1952
- Disbanded: 1969
- Seats: 39

Elections
- Voting system: Proportional representation, First past the post and Nominations

The Punjab Legislative Council was the upper house of the state legislature of the Indian state of Punjab. This upper house of the Punjab legislature was disbanded by Punjab Legislative Council (Abolition) Act, 1969. Through this law, the legislature of Punjab became unicameral.
