= Samesi =

- Village
- Interactive map of Samesi
- Coordinates: 26.614543°N 81.101681°E
- Country: India
- District: Lucknow district
- State: Uttar Pradesh

Area
  - Total: 2,143.14 ha (5,295.8 acres)

Population (2011)
  - Total: 11,646
  - Density: 543.41/km^{2} (1,407.4/sq mi)
- Demonym(s): Samesiha, Samesia, Samesiite
- Time zone: UTC+5:30 hours (IST)
- pincode: 226303

Samesi is a village in Lucknow district, India with a population of 11,646 in 2011. Samesi is known for its large vegetable market. Samesi is the only bazaar that remains open 365 days a year. Samesi comes under the Mohanlalganj Block and is the largest gram panchayat in the Mohanlalganj subdivision of Lucknow. It contains 28 majras.

There are two government clinics in Samesi; one is a homeopathic clinic and the other is Ayurvedic. There are three government-run schools along with four private schools, an inter-college and an English-medium playschool. Along with a big on-road market, there are several grocery shops and general stores across the village.

There are many mohallas/muhallas (districts or neighborhoods) in the village, namely Thakur Dwara, Bazaar Tola, Kanchan Khera, Mela, Mahua Bagh, Pajawa, Koriyayi, Diha, Singhaniya, Mahamayin, and Chamrahiya.

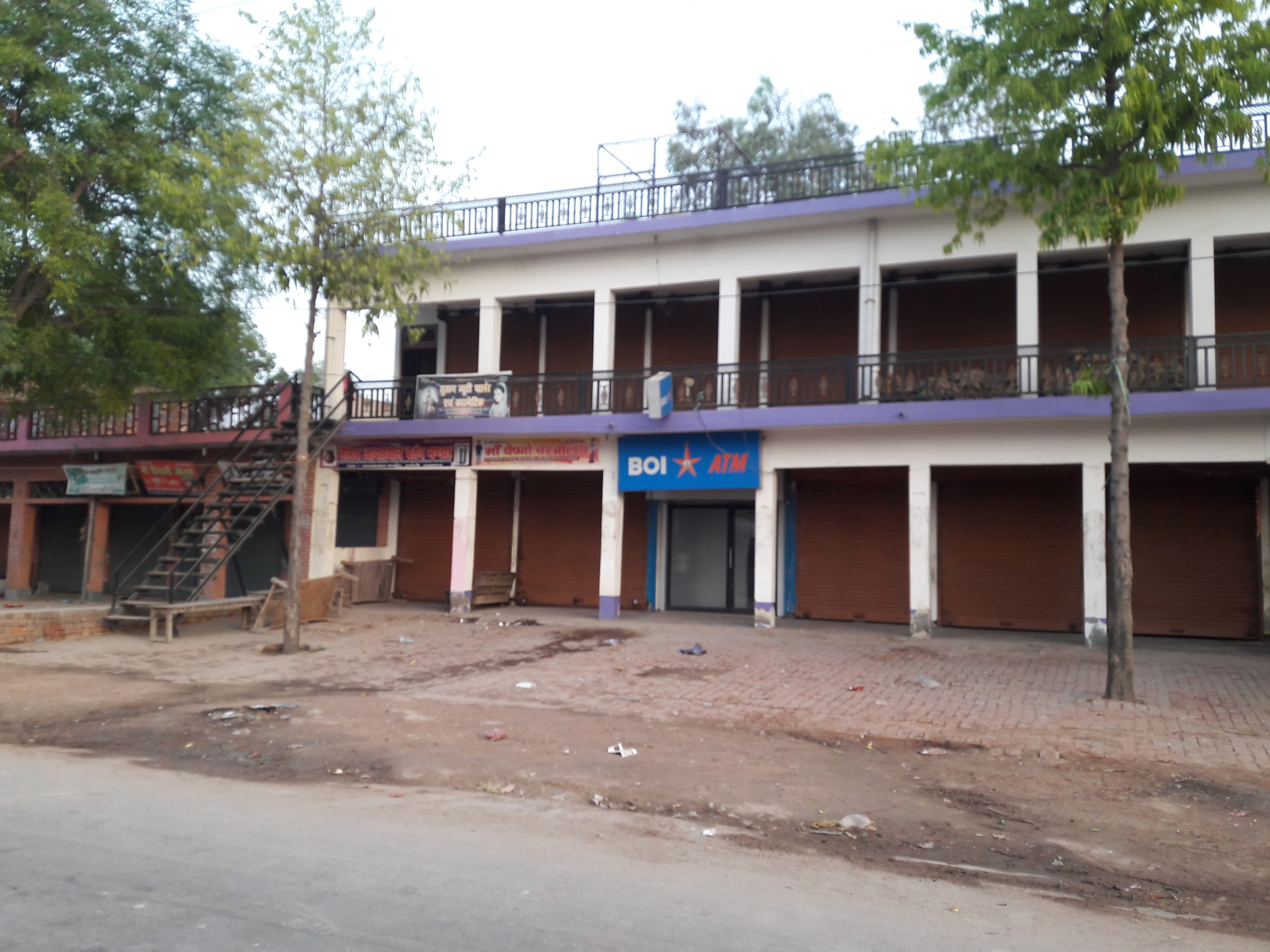
6 AM
