= Jabrauli =

Village in Uttar Pradesh, India

Coordinates: 26°37′17″N 80°58′28″E

- Village
- Location in Uttar Pradesh, India Jabrauli (India)
- Country: India
- State: Uttar Pradesh
- District: Lucknow
- Tehsil: Mohanlalganj
- Time zone: UTC+5:30 (IST)
- Vehicle registration: UP

Jabrauli is a village in the Mohanlalganj tehsil of Lucknow district, in the Indian state of Uttar Pradesh. Jabrauli gained international attention when former U.S. President Bill Clinton visited in 2014 to support health initiatives.
