= Ghanshyam Saraf =

Indian politician

Minister of State Government of Haryana
- In office 24 July 2015 – 22 July 2016
- Ministry: Term
- Minister of Public Health Engineering (Independent Charge): 24 July 2015 - 22 July 2016
- Minister of Excise & Taxation: 24 July 2015 - 22 July 2016

Member of Haryana Legislative Assembly
- Incumbent
- Assumed office 2009
- Preceded by: Shiv Shanakar Bharadwaj
- Constituency: Bhiwani

Personal details
- Born: 5 November 1963 (age 62) Bhiwani, Punjab, India (now in Haryana, India)
- Party: Bharatiya Janata Party
- Spouse: Prem Lata Sarraf
- Children: 3
- Education: Kurukshetra University
- Occupation: Politician
- As of 6 October, 2021

Ghanshyam Saraf is a member of the Haryana Legislative Assembly from the BJP representing the Bhiwani Vidhan sabha Constituency in Haryana.
