= Ram Lal Kureel =

Indian politician

Member of Parliament, Lok Sabha
- In office 1977–1980
- Preceded by: Ganga Devi
- Succeeded by: Kailash Pati
- Constituency: Mohanlalganj

Personal details
- Born: 9 January 1939 (age 87) Banthera, Lucknow district, United Provinces, British India
- Party: Janata Party
- Spouse: Kirti Kureel
- Education: Lucknow University; Meerut University
- Profession: Politician

Ram Lal Kureel was an Indian politician. He born Kureel Family. He was elected to the Lok Sabha the lower house of Indian Parliament from Mohanlalganj in Uttar Pradesh in 1977 as a member of the Janata Party. He was earlier a scientist in Solar energy working in Central Building Research Institute.
