= Shahabad Assembly constituency =

Constituency of the Uttar Pradesh legislative assembly in India

Shahabad
- Constituency No. 155 for the Uttar Pradesh Legislative Assembly

Constituency details
- Country: India
- Region: North India
- State: Uttar Pradesh
- District: Hardoi
- Established: 1951
- Total electors: 312,452 (2012)
- Reservation: None

Member of Legislative Assembly
- 18th Uttar Pradesh Legislative Assembly
- Incumbent Rajani Tiwari
- Party: Bharatiya Janta Party

Shahabad Assembly constituency is one of the 403 constituencies of the Uttar Pradesh Legislative Assembly, India. It is a part of the Hardoi district and one of the five assembly constituencies in the Hardoi Lok Sabha constituency. First election in this assembly constituency was held in 1952 after the "DPACO (1951)" (delimitation order) was passed in 1951. After the "Delimitation of Parliamentary and Assembly Constituencies Order" was passed in 2008, the constituency was assigned identification number 155. From 1957 to 2008, this constituency had more than one seat (MLA) and from 2008, the number of seats have been confined to one.

== Wards / Areas ==
Extent of Shahabad Assembly constituency is KCs Shahabad, Alamnagar & Shiroman Nagar of Shahabad Tehsil.

== Members of the Legislative Assembly ==
From	Term	Name	Party	Comments	Ref
Mar-1952	01st Vidhan Sabha	Syed Aizaz Rasool	Indian National Congress	-	
Apr-1957	02nd Vidhan Sabha	Vidyavati Bajpai	Indian National Congress	Constituency had four seats	
Apr-1957	02nd Vidhan Sabha	Kanhaiya Lal Balmiki	Indian National Congress	Constituency had four seats	
Apr-1957	02nd Vidhan Sabha	Kalyan Rai	Indian National Congress	Constituency had four seats	
Apr-1957	02nd Vidhan Sabha	Baldeo Singh Arya	Indian National Congress	Constituency had four seats	
Mar-1962	03rd Vidhan Sabha	Piarey Lal	Bharatiya Jana Sangh	Constituency had two seats	
Mar-1962	03rd Vidhan Sabha	Baldeo Singh Arya	Indian National Congress	Constituency had two seats	
Mar-1967	04th Vidhan Sabha	Harihar Bux Singh	Indian National Congress	Constituency had two seats	
Mar-1967	04th Vidhan Sabha	Banshi Dhar	Swatantra Party	Constituency had two seats	
Feb-1969	05th Vidhan Sabha	Harihar Bux Singh	Indian National Congress	Constituency had two seats	
Feb-1969	05th Vidhan Sabha	Banshi Dhar	Bharatiya Kranti Dal	Constituency had two seats	
Mar-1974	06th Vidhan Sabha	Dadhich Singh	Bharatiya Jana Sangh	Constituency had two seats	
Mar-1974	06th Vidhan Sabha	Banshi Dhar	Indian National Congress	Constituency had two seats	
Jun-1977	07th Vidhan Sabha	Brij Ballabh Singh	Independent	Constituency had two seats	
Jun-1977	07th Vidhan Sabha	Jagan Singh	Janata Party	Constituency had two seats	
Jun-1980	08th Vidhan Sabha	Ram Autar Dixit	Indian National Congress (I)	Constituency had two seats	
Jun-1980	08th Vidhan Sabha	Banshi Dhar	Indian National Congress (I)	Constituency had two seats	
Mar-1985	09th Vidhan Sabha	Ram Autar Dixit	Indian National Congress	Constituency had two seats	
Mar-1985	09th Vidhan Sabha	Jagan Singh	Lok Dal	Constituency had two seats	
Dec-1989	10th Vidhan Sabha	Ram Autar Dixit	Indian National Congress	Constituency had two seats	
Dec-1989	10th Vidhan Sabha	Banshidhar	Indian National Congress	Constituency had two seats	
Jun-1991	11th Vidhan Sabha	Babu Khan	Independent	Constituency had two seats	
Jun-1991	11th Vidhan Sabha	Swami Parmanand Dandi	Bharatiya Janata Party	Constituency had two seats	
Dec-1993	12th Vidhan Sabha	Babu Khan	Samajwadi Party	Constituency had two seats	
Dec-1993	12th Vidhan Sabha	Swami Parmanand Dandi	Bharatiya Janata Party	Constituency had two seats	
Oct-1996	13th Vidhan Sabha	Babu Khan	Samajwadi Party	Constituency had two seats	
Oct-1996	13th Vidhan Sabha	Swami Parmanand Dandi	Samajwadi Party	Constituency had two seats	
Feb-2002	14th Vidhan Sabha	Ganga Bhakt Singh	Bharatiya Janata Party	Constituency had two seats	
Feb-2002	14th Vidhan Sabha	Kashi Ram	Samajwadi Party	Constituency had two seats	
May-2007	15th Vidhan Sabha	Ashif	Bahujan Samaj Party	Constituency had two seats	
May-2007	15th Vidhan Sabha	Kashi Ram	Bharatiya Janata Party	Constituency had two seats	
Mar-2012	16th Vidhan Sabha	Babu Khan	Samajwadi Party	-	
Mar-2017	17th Vidhan Sabha	Rajani Tiwari	Bhartiya Janta Party	-	
Mar-2022	18th Vidhan Sabha	Rajani Tiwari	Bhartiya Janta Party		

== Election results ==
=== 2027 ===
2027 Uttar Pradesh Legislative Assembly election: Shahabad
Party	Candidate	Votes	%	±%
INDIA				
NDA				
BSP				
NOTA	None of the above			
Majority				
Turnout				
gain from		Swing		

=== 2022 ===
2022 Uttar Pradesh Legislative Assembly election: Shahabad
Party	Candidate	Votes	%	±%
BJP	Rajani Tiwari	94,561	40.49	▼4.81
SP	Mohd Asif Khan	88,082	37.72	▲30.55
BSP	Ahivran Singh Lodhi	37,475	16.05	▼27.31
Independent	Akhilesh Pathak	4,380	1.88	
NOTA	None of the above	1,664	0.71	▼0.49
Majority		6,479	2.77	▲0.83
Turnout		233,517	65.76	▲1.8
BJP hold		Swing		

=== 2017 ===
17th Vidhan Sabha: 2017 General Elections

2017 General Elections: Shahabad
Party	Candidate	Votes	%	±%
BJP	Rajani Tiwari	99,624	45.3	
BSP	Asif Khan	95,364	43.36	
SP	Sartaj Khan	15,767	7.17	
NOTA	None of the above	2,615	1.2	
Majority		4,260	1.94	
Turnout		219,939	63.96	
[[BJP|BJP]] gain from [[BSP|BSP]]		Swing		

== See also ==
- Hardoi district
- Hardoi Lok Sabha constituency
- Sixteenth Legislative Assembly of Uttar Pradesh
- Uttar Pradesh Legislative Assembly
- Vidhan Bhawan
