= Kinder Lal =

Indian politician (1914–1991)

Member of Parliament, Lok Sabha
- In office 1962-1977
- Preceded by: Chheda Lal Gupta
- Succeeded by: Parmai Lal
- In office 1984-1989
- Preceded by: Manni Lal
- Succeeded by: Parmai Lal
- Constituency: Hardoi, Uttar Pradesh

Personal details
- Born: 17 June 1914 Daulatpur, Hardoi district, United Provinces of Agra and Oudh, British India
- Died: 5 October 1991 (aged 77)
- Party: Indian National Congress
- Spouse: Ram Pyari
- Children: 1 son and 1 daughter

Kinder Lal also spelt as Kindar Lal was an Indian politician. He was elected as member of parliament to the Lok Sabha, the lower house of the Parliament of India from Hardoi, Uttar Pradesh in 1962, 1967,1971 and 1984 as a member of the Indian National Congress.
