= Rajani Tiwari =

Indian politician

Rajni Tiwari

Minister of State, Government of Uttar Pradesh
- Incumbent
- Assumed office March 2022

MLA, 17th & 18th Uttar Pardesh Assembly
- Incumbent
- Assumed office March 2017
- Preceded by: Babu Khan
- Constituency: Shahabad

MLA, 16th Legislative Assembly
- In office March 2012 – March 2017
- Preceded by: constituency established
- Succeeded by: Madhvendra Pratap Singh
- Constituency: Sawayazpur

MLA, 15th Legislative Assembly
- In office April 2008 – March 2012
- Preceded by: By-election upon the death of Upendra Tiwari
- Succeeded by: constituency abolished
- Constituency: Bilgram

Personal details
- Born: 21 July 1973 (age 53) Bilgram, Uttar Pradesh, India
- Party: Bhartiya Janta Party (2016 – present)
- Children: 2
- Education: Kanpur University (B.A.)
- Profession: Agriculture and business

Rajni Tiwari (born 21 July 1973) is an Indian politician, a Minister of State in the Government of Uttar Pradesh and a member of the 18th Legislative Assembly. She represents the Shahabad constituency and is a member of the Bhartiya Janta Party.

== Early life and education ==
Tiwari was born on 21 July 1973 to Krishna Prasad Agnihotri in Bilgram in Hardoi district. She graduated with a Bachelor of Arts from Arya Kanya Degree College, Hardoi, Kanpur University. Tiwari is an agriculturalist and businesswoman by profession.

== Personal life ==
Tiwari was married to Upendra Tiwari, with whom she has a son and a daughter. Upendra Tiwari was an MLA from Bilgram constituency. He died in 2007 which left the Bilgram constituency seat vacant. Tiwari was elected as an MLA in the 2008 by-polls.

== Positions held ==
#	From	To	Position
1	2008	2012	Member, 15th Legislative Assembly
2	2008	2012	Member, Women and Child welfare committee
3	2012	2017	Member, 16th Legislative Assembly
4	2012	2017	Member, Women and Child welfare committee
5	2017	2022	Member, 17th Legislative Assembly
6	2017	2022	Member, Women and Child welfare committee
7	2022	Incumbent	Member, 18th Legislative Assembly
