= Sawaijpur Assembly constituency =

Constituency of the Uttar Pradesh legislative assembly in India

Sawaijpur
- Constituency No. 154 for the Uttar Pradesh Legislative Assembly

Constituency details
- Country: India
- Region: North India
- State: Uttar Pradesh
- District: Hardoi
- Total electors: 341,209 (2012)
- Reservation: None

Member of Legislative Assembly
- 18th Uttar Pradesh Legislative Assembly
- Incumbent Madhvendra Pratap Singh
- Party: Bharatiya Janta Party
- Elected year: 2022

Sawaijpur Assembly constituency is one of the 403 constituencies of the Uttar Pradesh Legislative Assembly, India. It is a part of the Hardoi district and one of the five assembly constituencies in the Hardoi Lok Sabha constituency. First election in this assembly constituency was held in 2012 after the "Delimitation of Parliamentary and Assembly Constituencies Order, 2008" was passed and the constituency was formed in 2008. The constituency is assigned identification number 154.

== Wards / Areas ==
Extent of Sawayajpur Assembly constituency is Sawayajpur Tehsil

== Members of the Legislative Assembly ==
#	Term	Name	Party	From	To	Days	Comments	Ref
01	16th Vidhan Sabha	Rajani Tiwari	Bahujan Samaj Party	Mar-2012	Mar-2017	-	-	
02	17th Vidhan Sabha	Madhvendra Pratap Singh	Bharatiya Janata Party	Mar-2017	Mar-2022			
03	18th Vidhan Sabha	Madhvendra Pratap Singh	Bharatiya Janata Party	Mar-2022	Incumbent			

== Election results ==
=== 2027 ===
2027 Uttar Pradesh Legislative Assembly election: Sawaijpur
Party	Candidate	Votes	%	±%
INDIA				
NDA				
BSP				
NOTA	None of the above			
Majority				
Turnout				
gain from		Swing		

=== 2022 ===
2022 Uttar Pradesh Legislative Assembly election: Sawaijpur
Party	Candidate	Votes	%	±%
BJP	Madhvendra Pratap Singh	114,263	46.03	▲6.09
SP	Padamrag Singh Yadav	88,576	35.68	▲7.37
BSP	Dr. Rahul Tiwari	21,221	8.55	▼17.24
INC	Rajvardhan Singh	11,396	4.59	
JAP(L)	Vedram	5,418	2.18	
NOTA	None of the above	1,488	0.6	▼0.2
Majority		25,687	10.35	▼1.28
Turnout		248,222	61.54	▲1.28
BJP hold		Swing		

=== 2017 ===
2017 Uttar Pradesh Legislative Assembly Election: Sawaijpur
Party	Candidate	Votes	%	±%
BJP	Madhvendra Pratap Singh	92,601	39.94	
SP	Padamrag Singh Yadav	65,631	28.31	
BSP	Dr. Anupam Dubey Advocate	59,791	25.79	
Jan Adhikar Manch	Yadunandan Lal	3,569	1.54	
NOTA	None of the above	1,831	0.8	
Majority		26,970	11.63	
Turnout		231,842	60.26	

=== 2012 ===
16th Vidhan Sabha: 2012 General Elections

2012 General Elections: Sawaijpur
Party	Candidate	Votes	%	±%
BSP	Rajni Tiwari	49,099	23.32	−
Independent	Padamarag Singh Yadav	44,580	21.17	−
BJP	Kunwar Madhavendra Pratap	37,604	17.86	−
	Remainder 17 candidates	79,276	37.64	−
Majority		4,519	2.15	−
Turnout		210,559	61.71	−
BSP win (new seat)				

== See also ==
- Hardoi district
- Hardoi Lok Sabha constituency
- Sixteenth Legislative Assembly of Uttar Pradesh
- Uttar Pradesh Legislative Assembly
- Vidhan Bhawan
