= Drohar Shivadin =

Indian politician

Drohar Shivadin was an Indian politician and member of the Bharatiya Jana Sangh. Shivadin was a member of the 2nd Lok Sabha from the Hardoi constituency in Uttar Pradesh.

He was born on 1 May 1898 in Gopamau, Hardoi district. He supervisor of education of Depressed Classes and was interests in Reform movement of downtrodden classes.
