= Parmai Lal =

Indian politician

Member of Parliament, Lok Sabha
- In office 1977-1980
- Preceded by: Kinder Lal
- Succeeded by: Manni Lal
- In office 1989-1990
- Preceded by: Manni Lal
- Succeeded by: Chand Ram
- Constituency: Hardoi, Uttar Pradesh

Personal details
- Born: 1944 (age 81–82) Baksapur Village, Hardoi district, United Provinces, British India
- Party: Janata Dal
- Spouse: Jadu Rani
- Children: 2 sons and 5 daughters

Parmai Lal is an Indian politician. He was elected to the Lok Sabha, the lower house of the Parliament of India from Hardoi, Uttar Pradesh in 1977 as a member of the Janata Party and in 1989 as member of the Janata Dal. He was earlier a member of the Uttar Pradesh Legislative Assembly.
