= Ganga Devi (politician) =

Indian politician (1916–1984)

Member of Parliament, Lok Sabha
- In office 1952–1977
- Succeeded by: Ram Lal Kureel
- Constituency: Mohanlalganj

Personal details
- Born: 10 December 1916 Dehra Dun, United Provinces, British India (present-day Uttarakhand, India)
- Died: 24 May 1984 (aged 67) Ghaziabad, Uttar Pradesh, India
- Party: Indian National Congress
- Spouse: Jaipal Singh
- Profession: Politician

Ganga Devi (10 December 1916 – 24 May 1984) was an Indian politician belonging to the Indian National Congress. She was elected to the Lok Sabha the lower house of Indian Parliament from Mohanlalganj in Uttar Pradesh in 1952, 1957, 1962, 1967 and 1971. She was defeated in 1977 by Ram Lal Kureel.

== Early life and education ==
Ganga Devi, daughter of Chanda Lall, was born in Dehradun, Uttar Pradesh (now in Uttarakhand) on 10 December 1916. She studied at Mahadevi Kanya Pathshala, Dehradun and later at D.A.V. College, Dehradun and Banaras Hindu University, Varanasi. She graduated with a Bachelor of Arts.

== Career ==
Ganga Devi was on the Scholarship Board for Scheduled Castes, Scheduled Tribes and other Backward Classes of India from 1952 to 1954, Tea and Coffee Board from 1952 to 1954 and Central Social Welfare Board from 1958 to 1960. She was in the Employees Union, Meerut from 1950 to 1953 and All India Scheduled Castes Uplift Union. She was also the organiser of Rashtriya Sewa Sangathan, President and Founder of All India Depressed Classes League, Women's Section and President of Rashtriya Seva Sansthan.

Devi was member of the first Lok Sabha from 1952 to 1957, second Lok Sabha from 1957 to 1962, third Lok Sabha from 1962 to 1967 and Estimates Committee from 1963 to 1964. (5) She was also the Executive Committee of the Congress Party in Parliament from 1962 to 1964 and in 1967 and member of the fourth Lok Sabha from 1967 to 1970.

Devi was involved in various social activities like welfare of the backward classes in rural areas, children's education, eradication of social evils like child marriage, caste system etc. Her special interests included development of village industries, welfare of Harijans and other Backward Classes and eradication of casteism and communalism.

== Personal life and death ==
Ganga Devi married Jaipal Singh on 21 June 1941 and together they had one daughter and one son. She liked gardening, reading and touring, especially in backward areas. She lived in Lucknow, Uttar Pradesh.

Devi died in Ghaziabad on 24 May 1984, at the age of 67.
