= Kaushal Kishore (politician) =

Indian politician

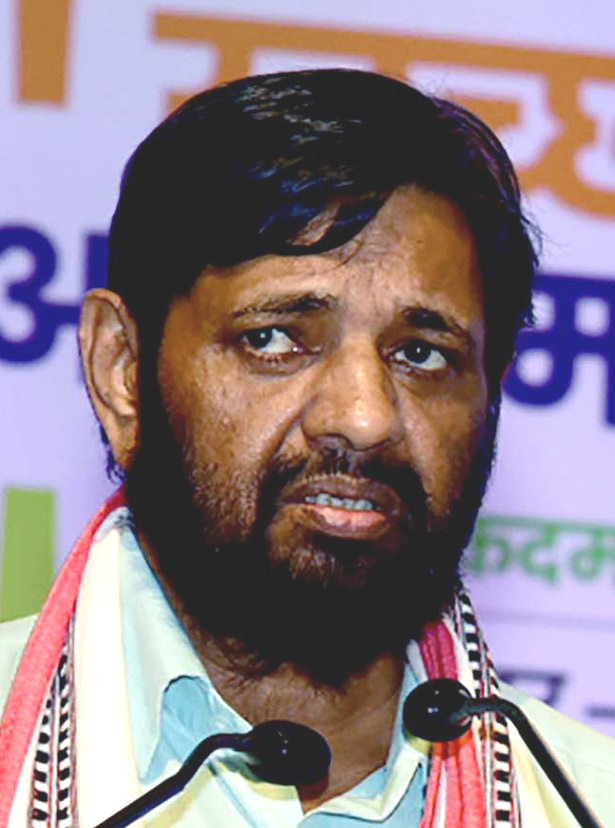
- Kaushal Kishore in 2022

Minister of State for Housing and Urban Affairs
- In office 7 July 2021 – 11 June 2024
- President: Ram Nath Kovind
- Prime Minister: Narendra Modi
- Minister: Hardeep Singh Puri
- Succeeded by: Tokhan Sahu

Member of Parliament, Lok Sabha
- In office 16 May 2014 – 4 June 2024
- Preceded by: Sushila Saroj
- Constituency: Mohanlalganj

Personal details
- Born: 25 January 1960 (age 66) Kakori, Uttar Pradesh, India
- Party: Bharatiya Janata Party
- Spouse: Jai Devi (m. 1984)
- Children: 4
- Education: Kali Charan Inter College
- Occupation: Agriculturist, Politician
- As of 7 July, 2021 Source: []

Kaushal Kishore is an Indian politician. He served as the Minister of State for Ministry of Housing and Urban Affairs, Government of India from 7 July 2021 to 11 June 2024. He is representing Mohanlalganj constituency, Uttar Pradesh. He is the national president of Parakh Mahasangh and is the State President of the party's SC wing.

== Early life ==
He was born in Begariya village, Tehsil-Mohanlalganj, District-Lucknow, Uttar Pradesh into a schedule caste Pasi community to Shri Kallu Prasad and Smt. Parvati Devi. His mother was a housewife and his father was a farmer. The small land holding was not sufficient for family subsistence.

== Education ==
After completing his intermediate studies at his native place, Kali Charan Inter college, Lucknow, Kishore took admission in under graduate course at C.R. Degree College but could not continue as he got involved in family illness, and labourers and cultivators' causes.

He could buy a bicycle only in class 12th, after getting his first scholarship in 1977.

== Career ==
Kishore was MLA from Malihabad constituency in 2002. In 2002-2003 he also rose to be a minister of state in Mulayam Singh's government.

== Controversy ==
Kishore came under public scrutiny when he blamed the decision-making skills of "educated women" when commenting on the murder of Shraddha Walkar. Kishore blamed women for choosing their own partners and stated that they should "learn from such incidents (Shraddha murder). They should stay with someone with the approval of their parents".

In Aug 2023 a murder took place at the residence of Union Minister of State Kaushal Kishore located in Begaria village of Thakurganj police station area. Here Vinay Srivastava was shot dead with a pistol belonging to Kaushal Kishore's son, Vikas Kishore. DCP Rahul Raj said, Vinay Srivastava, who was also a close aide of Kaushal Kishore's son, died due to bullet injury on his head. There was an injury mark on the head also.

=== Positions held ===
- 2002-2007: member, Uttar Pradesh Legislative Assembly
- 2003-2004: Minister of State, Govt. of Uttar Pradesh
- May 2014: elected to 16th Lok Sabha
- May 2019: elected to 17th Lok Sabha
- 1 September 2014 – present: member, Standing Committee on Home Affairs; member, Consultative Committee, Ministry of Labour and Employment
