= Nagram =

Nagram Nalgram
- Town
- Location in Uttar Pradesh, India
- Coordinates: 26.62°N 81.13°E
- Country: India
- State: Uttar Pradesh
- District: Lucknow
- Founder: Raja Nalgram or Nal pasi

Government
  - Type: Electoral
  - Body: Samajwadi Party
- Elevation: 118 m (387 ft)

Population (2001)
  - Total: 19,218

Languages
  - Official: Hindi
- Time zone: UTC+5:30 (IST)
- Postal code: 226303 / 227308
- Website: Nagram Community Website

Nagram is a town in Lucknow district, Uttar Pradesh, India. It is located between the two roads from Lucknow to Sultanpur and Raebareli.It was founded and named after Nalgram Raja, a Pasi king.

== Geography ==
Nagram is located at 26.62°N 81.13°E. It has an average elevation of 118 m (387 ft). It is situated 37 km from Lucknow, the state capital of Uttar Pradesh.it makes boundaries with the district Barabanki in East and Raibareli In The south.

=== Climate ===
Nagram has a humid subtropical climate with cool, dry winters from mid-November to February and dry, hot summers with sunshine from March to mid-May and thunderstorms from late March to June. More than nine-tenths of the annual rainfall occurs from June to October when the city receives an average of 827.2 mm (32.57 in) from the southwest monsoon winds, although occasionally frontal rainfall from the northeast monsoon will occur in January. In winter, the maximum temperature is around 25 °C (77 °F) and the minimum is around 3–7 °C (37–45 °F). Fog is quite common from mid-December to mid February.

In the unusual winter cold spell of 2012–13, Nagram recorded temperatures below freezing on two consecutive days and the minimum temperature hovered around freezing point for over a week. Summers are very hot with temperatures rising into the 42 °C (104 °F) to 45 °C (113 °F) range, the average highs being in the high of 30s (degree Celsius).

== History ==
Nagram has two old buildings called Imambargahs, which are of archaeological importance: Imambargah Wajahat Hussain (popularly known as Syed-wada), located in the center of Nagram, and Imambargah Mir Fida Hussain, which displays elements of Persian architecture. Anjuman-e-Abbasiya is the oldest and existing anjuman of Nagram.

The town culture originated in the Awadh region. Many people migrated from town after the Partition of India.

== Economy ==
As of 1971, the economy of Nagram was dominated by primary activities. The main items imported were cloth, sugar, and cotton. The main items manufactured were shoes, handloom cloth, and beedies. The biggest exports were grains, vegetables, and tobacco.

== Transport ==
The nearest railway station to Nagram is on the Indian Railways network in Nigoha. The bus station is at Lucknow–Raebareli road. The nearest international airport is Chaudhary Charan Singh Airport, 36.1 km (22.4 mi) away.

== Schools and colleges ==
- Girls Degree College
- Nagram Primary School
- Madarsa Afzalul Uloom
- RNJ Inter College
- Chaudhary Ram Adhar Santbaksh Inter College

== Demographics ==
Religions in Nagram
Religion	Percent
Hinduism	65%
Islam	35%
Others†	2%
Distribution of religions †Includes Sikhs (0.2%), Buddhists (<0.2%).

As of 2001, Nagram had a population of 9,218. Males constitute 51% of the population and females 49%. Nagram has an average literacy rate of 43%, lower than the national average of 59.5%: male literacy is 53%, and female literacy is 33%. In Nagram, 17% of the population is under 6 years of age.
