= Sagar Ram Gupta =

Indian politician

MLA, Haryana Legislative Assembly
- In office 1982 – 1986
- Preceded by: Bir Singh
- Succeeded by: Banarsi Das Gupta
- In office 1962 – 1966
- Succeeded by: B. Dev

Personal details
- Born: 10 November 1931 Vill. Sisai, Hisar, Punjab, British India, now Haryana
- Died: 23 June 2009 (aged 78) Bhiwani, India
- Party: Indian National Congress
- Education: BITS Pilani and Punjab University, Chandigarh

Sagar Ram Gupta (10 November 1931 – 23 June 2009) was an Indian politician who served as Cabinet Minister twice in Government of Haryana.

== Early life ==
He was born in a simple Mahajan family of Village Sisai of Tehsil Hansi of Hisar district. He got his primary education in the middle school of the village itself. Sagar Ram, who had interest and passion in studies from the beginning, secured the first position in Hisar district in the high school examination. Afterwards, he took admission in Birla College (now BITS Pilani) to continue his further studies.

== Education ==
Sagar Ram did his B.Com. and M.A. (Economics) from Birla College Pilani, followed by LLB (law degree), for which he studied at the Punjab University, Chandigarh.

== Political career ==
In 1950, Bhiwani T.I.T. Mill manager went to Pilani as he needed a good steno typist and Sagar Ram secured first position with excellent marks in type. On 1 May 1951, he started working as Steno-Typist in Bhiwani T.I.T. Mill. He also appeared in the competitive examination and passed the Punjab Civil Services Examination while serving his job. He secured 12th rank in Punjab PCS examination but the government had to keep only six on the job so he was not selected. After this, he started preparing for Indian Administrative Services (IAS) and passed the written examination of IAS in 1956. He got a good AIR but was not selected because he was found comrade in police investigation.

While working in the mill, he formed a union of workers and started working for the rights of the workers. He was the General Secretary of the Punjab Indian National Trade Union Congress (INTUC) and was the President of Haryana INTUC for 16 years. In 1960, he went to England for four months leading the delegation of four members from India INTUC in the training program of Commonwealth countries. He also went to Germany, France, Italy, Egypt, Switzerland and Netherland during training.

Due to popular among trade unions in the city and the mill, he got ticket from Indian National Congress in 1962 and became MLA for the first time and was inducted as Minister for Labour and Employment in the first Government of Haryana formed under the leadership of B. D. Sharma. After becoming the Minister, he made the laws for the laborers, stopped the practice of social abuses like Katma Pali and built the ESIC hospital in Bhiwani.

In the 1967 Assembly Elections, he was given the charge to select the ticket for constituencies of Hisar and Bhiwani district on behalf of Indian National Congress. He decided 17 tickets out of which 14 MLA's were reached to Haryana Legislative Assembly but lost itself. After losing the election, he started advocating and started fighting the worker's cases. In 1970, he went to the United States for three months for a Trade Union Training on behalf of Indian National Trade Union Congress (INTUC).

In 1982, he was again elected to Haryana Legislative Assembly and became the Finance Minister of Haryana in the Bhajan Lal Cabinet in 1984. During his tenure as Finance Minister, he also acted as CM for 12 days when Lal was went for an eye operation. In 1989, he went to Russia for 20 days leading the delegation of 15 members for a Trade Union Program.

Gupta was a well known labour leader in Haryana. He undertook several campaigns and went to jail many times for the rights and welfare of laborers. During working as President of Haryana INTUC, he published a weekly journal "Parishrami Sansaar" for four years.

In 1997–98, he was appreciated by 12th Prime Minister of India, Inder Kumar Gujral for his contribution towards upliftment of Labour sector in Haryana.

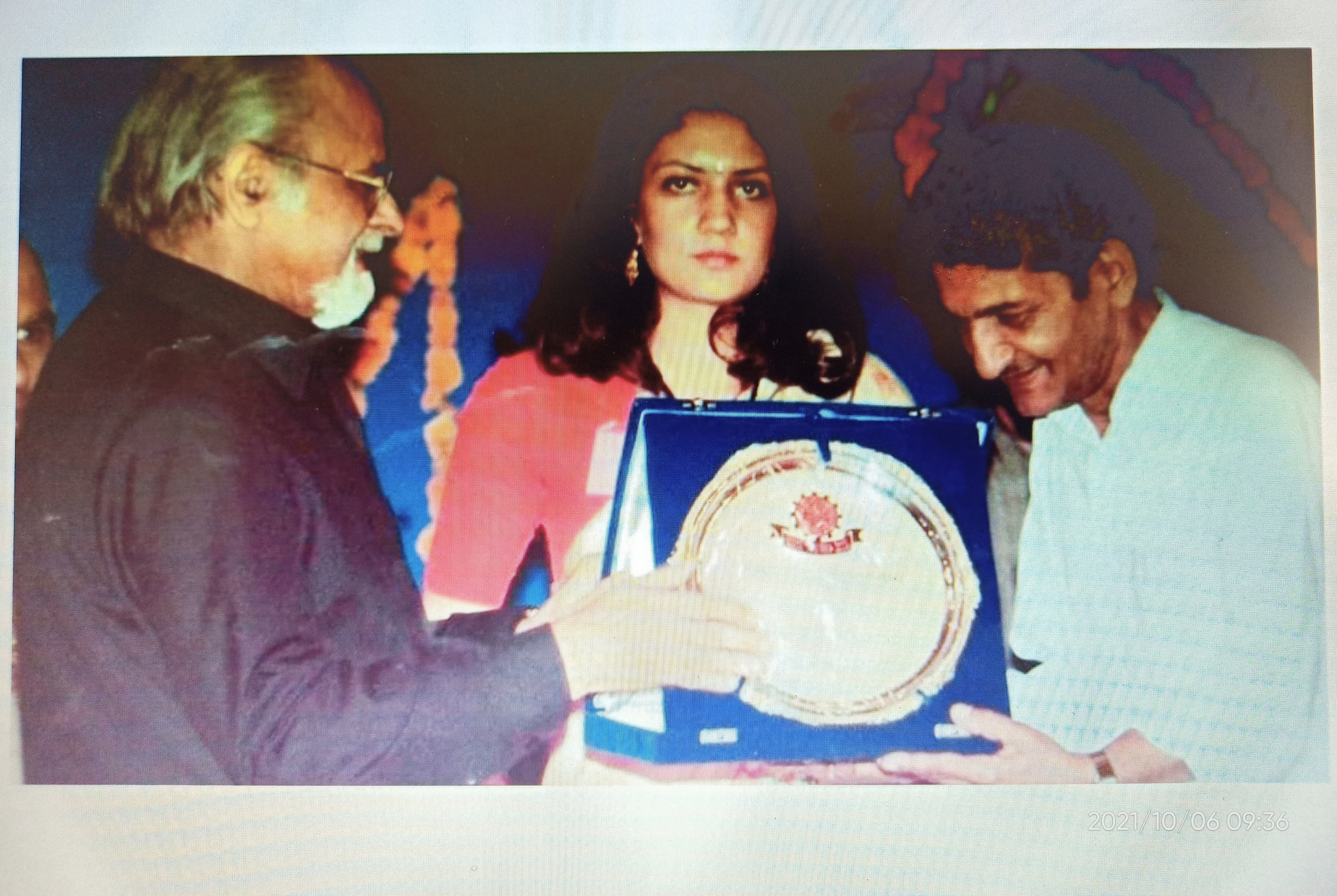

== Death ==
Gupta died at his residence in Bhiwani on 23 June 2009 midnight after a prolonged illness. He was survived by one son and four daughters. He was cremated at Bhiwani on 24 June 2009 which was largely attended by public.
