= Nigohan =

Nigohan Nigohān
- Populated place
- Location in Uttar Pradesh, India Nigohan (India)
- Coordinates: 26.561822°N 81.030833°E
- Country: India
- State: Uttar Pradesh
- District: Lucknow

Area
  - Total: 6.399 km^{2} (2.471 sq mi)

Population (2011)
  - Total: 6,474
  - Density: 1,012/km^{2} (2,620/sq mi)

Languages
  - Official: Hindi
- Time zone: UTC+5:30 (IST)

Nigohan is a large village in Mohanlalganj block of Lucknow district, Uttar Pradesh, India. Located to the west of the road from Lucknow to Raebareli, historically it was the seat of a pargana in Mohanlalganj tehsil. As of 2011, its population is 6,474, in 1,093 households. The Nigohan Railway Station is located east of the village and technically belongs to the village of Karanpur. Nigohan is the seat of a gram panchayat.

== History ==
According to legend, Nigohan was founded by a Chandrabansi raja named Nahush, who was transformed into a snake as punishment for cursing a Brahmin and made to live in a large tank to the south of the village. The Pandavas then came here during their travels, and one of them managed to break the spell and restore Raja Nahush to his human form. On being turned back into a human, Raja Nahush performed a great sacrifice, and this is commemorated in an annual festival during the month of Kartik. The festival takes place at the Abhiniwara tank, where there is a temple of Mahadeo (Shiva); Raja Nahush is also venerated at a shrine at the centre of the village.

At the turn of the 20th century, Nigohan was described as a large, primarily agricultural village, with extensive orchards that formed the main livelihood for its residents. The village then had an "upper primary school" and a small bazaar called Gumanganj, and it served as the headquarters of the Church of England's missionary operations in the region. The zamindars were a Gautam clan who, according to tradition, had become rulers by marrying a lady of the previous dynasty, the Janwars of Mau. In 1901, the population of Nigohan was 2,074, including 355 Muslims and 61 Christians.
