= Jai Devi =

Indian politician

Member of the Uttar Pradesh legislative assembly
- Incumbent
- Assumed office 11 March 2017
- Preceded by: Indal Kumar
- Constituency: Malihabad

Personal details
- Born: 1 January 1965 (age 61) Lucknow
- Party: Bharatiya Janata Party
- Spouse: Kaushal Kishore (m. 1984)
- Occupation: MLA
- Profession: Politician

Jai Devi is an Indian politician and a member of 17th Uttar Pradesh Assembly, Uttar Pradesh of India. She represents the ‘Malihabad’ constituency in Lucknow district of Uttar Pradesh.

== Political career ==
Jai Devi contested Uttar Pradesh Assembly Election in 2017 as Bhartiya Janata Party candidate and defeated her close contestant Rajbala from Samajwadi Party with a margin of 22,668 votes.

She contested again in 2022 as Bhartiya Janata Party candidate and defeated her close contestant Surendra Kumar from Samajwadi Party with a margin of 7,745 votes.

== Posts held ==
#	From	To	Position	Comments
01	2017	2022	Member, 17th Legislative Assembly	
02	2022	Incumbent	Member, 18th Legislative Assembly	
