= Punjab Legislative Council (Abolition) Act, 1969 =

Act of the Parliament of India

Parliament of India
- Long title: An Act to provide for the abolition of the Legislative Council of the State of Punjab and for matters supplemental, incidental and consequential thereto.
- Citation: Act No. 46 of 1969
- Enacted: 27 December 1969
- Commenced: 7 January 1970

Repealed by
- Repealing and Amending Act, 2017
- Status: Repealed

The Punjab Legislative Council (Abolition) Act, 1969 was a legislation in India, adopted in 1969. Through this legislation the Punjab Legislative Council was abolished. The Act also provides for matters supplemental, incidental and consequential as a result of the council's abolition. The law came into effect on 1 January 1970. Through this law, the legislature of Punjab became unicameral, omitting the word 'Punjab' from Article 168 of the Constitution of India (i.e. the article of the Constitution listing states with bicameral legislatures).

== See also ==
- Punjab Legislative Assembly
