= Amresh Kumar =

Member of the Uttar Pradesh Legislative Assembly

Member of Uttar Pradesh Legislative Assembly
- Incumbent
- Assumed office March 2022
- Preceded by: Ambrish Singh Pushkar
- Constituency: Mohanlalganj

Personal details
- Born: 7 September 1974 (age 51) Lucknow, Uttar Pradesh
- Party: Bharatiya Janata Party
- Profession: Politician

Amresh Kumar is an Indian politician and a member of the 18th Uttar Pradesh Assembly from the Mohanlalganj Assembly constituency of the Lucknow district. He is a member of the Bharatiya Janata Party.

== Early life ==
Amresh Kumar was born on 7 September 1974 in Lucknow, Uttar Pradesh, to a Hindu family of Ram Prasad. He married Veermati on 18 June 1996, and they have four children.

== See also ==
- 18th Uttar Pradesh Assembly
- Mohanlalganj Assembly constituency
- Uttar Pradesh Legislative Assembly
