= Kailash Pati =

Indian politician

Kailash Pati of the Indian National Congress (Indira) party won the 1980 Indian general election from Mohanlalganj.
