= Purnima Verma =

Indian politician

Member of Parliament, Lok Sabha
- Constituency: Mohanlalganj

Personal details
- Born: 25 November 1960
- Party: Bharatiya Janta Party
- Profession: Politician, Social Worker

Purnima Verma (born 25 November 1960) is a political and social worker and a Member of Parliament elected from the Mohanlalganj constituency in the Indian state of Uttar Pradesh being a Bharatiya Janta Party candidate.

== Early life ==
Purnima was born on 25 November 1960 in Kanpur (Uttar Pradesh). She married Shripal Verma 10 May 1973 and has three sons and a daughter.

== Education and career ==
Purnima was educated at Rohilkhand University, Bareilly. She was elected to the 11th Lok Sabha in 1996.

== Interests and social activities ==
Purnima has been involved in social service, welfare of women, child and youth development and women & child education. She spends her time reading books and participating in social programmes along with working on the development work in the constituency and participation in political activities.
