= Sushila Saroj =

Indian politician

- Born: 1 April 1951 (age 75); Gorakhpur, Uttar Pradesh, India
- Citizenship: India
- Education: MA, B.Ed & LL.B
- Occupations: Politician, social worker & agriculturist
- Years active: 1993–present
- Political party: Samajwadi Party (SP)
- Spouse: Mr. Ram Prakash Saroj
- Children: 3 daughters
- Parent(s): Mr. Mahadev Prasad (father) & Mrs. Anuraji Devi (mother)

Sushila Saroj is a member of the 15th Lok Sabha of India. She represents the Mohanlalganj constituency of Uttar Pradesh and is a member of the Samajwadi Party (SP) political party. The Mohanlalganj constituency is a reserved seat for a scheduled caste.

== Education and background ==
Saroj completed an MA, LL.B, and B.Ed from various universities in Gorakhpur, Rohilkhand, Kanpur, and Lucknow. Previously, she has been a member of the 13th Lok Sabha, a Member of the Legislative Assembly, and a Minister of State in Uttar Pradesh. She is the founder and chairperson of Virangana Udadevi Pasi Smarak Sangathan and also founded Pasi Trust.

== Posts held ==
#	From	To	Position
01	1993	1995	Member, Uttar Pradesh Legislative Assembly (for 21 months)
02	1995	1999	Minister of State, Social Welfare, Uttar Pradesh
03	1999	2004	Elected to 13th Lok Sabha from Misrikh Lok Sabha constituency
04	1999	2004	Member, Committee on Railways
05	1999	2004	Member, Committee on the Empowerment of Women
06	1999	2004	Member, Consultative Committee, Ministry of Labour
07	2009		Elected to 15th Lok Sabha (2nd term) from Mohanlalganj Lok Sabha constituency
08	31-Aug-2009		Member, Committee on Railways
09	04-Sep-2009		Member, Committee on Security in Parliament Complex
10	23-Sep-2009		Member, Committee on Empowerment of Women
11	23-Sep-2009		Member, Committee on Ministry of Housing and Urban Poverty Alleviation
12	23-Sep-2009		Member, Committee on Tourism

== See also ==
- List of members of the 15th Lok Sabha of India
