= Sarju Prasad Saroj =

Indian politician

Member of Parliament, Lok Sabha
- In office 1989–1991
- Preceded by: Jagannath Prasad
- Succeeded by: Chhotey Lal
- Constituency: Mohanlalganj

Personal details
- Born: 25 July 1942 Veerapur, Pratapgarh, United Provinces, British India
- Died: 27 July 2007 (aged 65)
- Party: Janata Dal
- Spouse: Shiv Devi
- Profession: Politician, Lawyer and Agriculturist

Sarju Prasad Saroj is an Indian politician belonging to the Janata Dal.He was elected to the Lok Sabha the lower house of Indian Parliament from Mohanlalganj in Uttar Pradesh in 1989.
