= Purseni =

Purseni is a village in Lucknow, Uttar Pradesh, India, which now comes under the city limits as it was included in Nagar nigam. It is approximately 20 km from Lucknow city's centre point. Purseni's gram panchayat comprises the villages: Purseni, Gopal Kheda, Nagar, Hiraman Kheda. The main activity center of this village is Thakur Dwara which hosts a temple and playground. During the time of Dushehera Thakurdwara also hosts Ram Lila for five days as well. The main activity of villagers includes farming, government services, etc.

== Festivals ==
Festivals which are celebrated are Holi, Diwali, Khichdi, Rakchha Bandhan. Also on the occasion of Holi, prahlad is staged and holika dahan is done, also after that color festival is celebrated and a folksong which is known as "Faag" is sung by villagers. At some places Thandai is served and in the evening Holi Milan is done where villagers go to each other's place and they are served with dishes such as gujhiya, namkeen, etc.
