= Babu Khan =

Indian politician

Babu Khan बाबू खान

MLA, 16th Legislative Assembly
- In office March 2012 – March 2017
- Preceded by: Kashi Ram & Ashif
- Constituency: Shahabad

MLA, 13th Legislative Assembly
- In office Oct 1996 – Mar 2002
- Preceded by: Self & Swami Parmanand Dandi
- Succeeded by: Ganga Bhakt Singh & Kashi Ram
- Constituency: Shahabad

MLA, 12th Legislative Assembly
- In office Dec 1993 – Oct 1995
- Preceded by: Self & Swami Parmanand Dandi
- Succeeded by: Self & Swami Parmanand Dandi
- Constituency: Shahabad

MLA, 11th Legislative Assembly
- In office Jun 1991 – Dec 1992
- Preceded by: Ram Autar Dixit & Banshidhar
- Succeeded by: Self & Swami Parmanand Dandi
- Constituency: Shahabad

Personal details
- Born: 16 June 1949 (age 77) Hardoi, United Provinces, India
- Party: Samajwadi Party
- Other political affiliations: Independent
- Spouse: Sofia Begum (wife)
- Children: 05 sons & 03 daughters
- Parent: Kasim Ali Khan (father)
- Education: C. S. N. Degree College, Hardoi
- Profession: Politician & farmer

Babu Khan (Hindi: बाबू खान) is an Indian politician and a member of the 16th Legislative Assembly in India. He represents the Shahabad constituency of Uttar Pradesh and is a member of the Samajwadi Party political party.

== Early life and education ==
Babu Khan was born in Hardoi district. He attended the C. S. N. Degree College, Hardoi and holds a Bachelor's degree.

== Political career ==
Babu Khan has been a MLA for four terms. He represented the Shahabad constituency and is a member of the Samajwadi Party political party. During his first term, he contested as an Independent candidate.

== Posts held ==
#	From	To	Position	Comments
01	2012	2017	Member, 16th Legislative Assembly	
02	1996	2002	Member, 13th Legislative Assembly	
03	1993	1995	Member, 12th Legislative Assembly	
04	1991	1992	Member, 11th Legislative Assembly	

== See also ==
- Shahabad (Assembly constituency)
- Sixteenth Legislative Assembly of Uttar Pradesh
- Uttar Pradesh Legislative Assembly
