= Usha Verma =

Indian politician

MP
- Constituency: Hardoi

Personal details
- Born: 5 May 1963 (age 63) Haridwar, Uttarakhand
- Party: SP
- Spouse: Lal Bihari
- Children: 1 son and 1 daughter
- As of 17 September, 2006

Usha Verma is an Indian politician. She was elected to the Lok Sabha, the lower house of the Parliament of India from Hardoi, Uttar Pradesh in 1998, 2004 and 2009 as a member of the Samajwadi Party as a SC candidate. She was elected to the Uttar Pradesh Legislative Assembly in 2002 and became a Minister in the Mulayam Singh Yadav ministry in 2003. She was the daughter in law of late member of parliament Parmai Lal, who is famous for winning his first election in 1962 while he was in prison.

== Early life and education ==
Usha Verma was born on 5 May 1963 in Haridwar, Uttrakhand to Basant Kumar and Usha Verma. She completed her master's degree in English from S.D. Degree College and B.S.M. Degree College, Roorkee, Uttar Pradesh.

Later she was married to Lal Bihari on 29 January 1988 and had a son and a daughter in a few years.

== Personal interests ==
She was interested in social work. She was even a member of joint committee of empowerment of women in 1999, then a member of committee on welfare of Scheduled Castes and Scheduled Tribes in 2004 and also was a member of Committee of Social Justice and Empowerment from 2004 to 2009.

She has interests in singing, cooking, and painting. She is associated with social initiatives focused on the welfare of underprivileged children and women. Professionally, she is an agriculturist, architect, political and social worker, and businessperson.

== Positions held ==
1998	Elected to 12th Lok Sabha

1998-99	Member, Joint Committee on the Empowerment of Women

Member, Consultative Committee, Ministry of Power

2002	Member, Uttar Pradesh Legislative Assembly

Minister of State, Govt. of Uttar Pradesh

2004	Re-elected to 14th Lok Sabha (2nd term)

Member, Committee on Welfare of Scheduled Castes and Scheduled Tribes

Member, Committee on Social Justice & Empowerment

5 Aug. 2007 to May 2009	Member, Committee on Social Justice & Empowerment

2009	Re-elected to 15th Lok Sabha (3rd term)

31 Aug. 2009	Member, Committee on Rural Development
