= Banarsi Das Gupta =

4th Chief Minister of Haryana

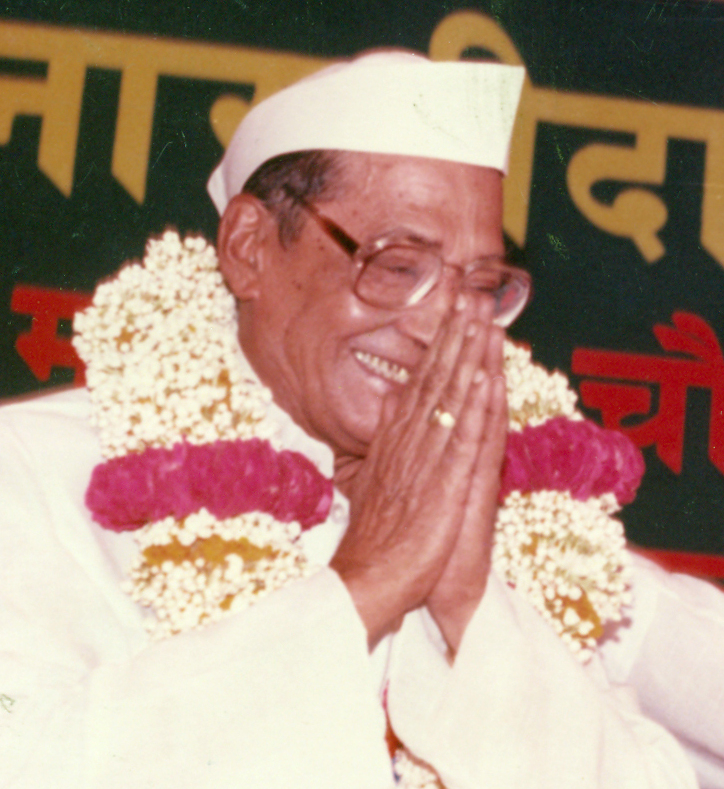

4th Chief Minister of Haryana
- In office 1 December 1975 – 30 April 1977
- Preceded by: Bansi Lal
- Succeeded by: Devi Lal
- In office 22 May 1990 – 12 July 1990
- Preceded by: Om Prakash Chautala
- Succeeded by: Om Prakash Chautala

Deputy Chief Minister of Haryana
- In office 20 June 1987 - 2 December 1989

Personal details
- Born: 5 November 1917 Bhiwani, Punjab, British India (now in Haryana, India)
- Died: 29 August 2007 (aged 89) New Delhi, India
- Party: Indian National Congress

Banarsi Das Gupta (5 November 1917 – 29 August 2007) was an Indian politician who served as the 4th Chief Minister of Haryana state in India.

== Life ==
Gupta was born in Bhiwani and he studied at Pilani in Rajasthan.

Gupta was a renowned freedom Fighter and he went to jail many times during the British rule. He established Parja Mandal in erstwhile Jind State in pre-independence period and launched agitation for establishment of a responsible Government in Jind State and was imprisoned several times. He undertook several padyatras, collected thousands of acres of land and distributed it among the landless during the Bhoodan Movement. He fought against traditional social abuses such as the dowry system, untouchability, and child marriage. He stood for widow remarriage rights and started the tradition of community marriages without dowry.

He was founder of the All India Vaish Federation (Vais Maha Sammelan); Founder and Patron of the Maharaj Agrasen Medical Education & Scientific Research Society, Haryana, Trustee of Vaish Mahavidyalaya Trust which runs (i) Vaish Senior Secondary School and (ii) Vaish Model School, Founder and Trustee and Member of Haryana Prakritik Chikitsalaya, President of Managing Committee of (i) Vaish P.G. Boys' College, (ii) Adarsh Mahila Mahavidyalaya (also founder of this institute) and (iii) and Chief Patron of All India Agarwal Sammelan. He was president of All Indian Agarwal Sammelan for over 20 years and worked hard to unite the trading community.

He was thrice elected to the Haryana Legislative Assembly and served once as its speaker. He was a minister for several years and served once as Deputy Chief Minister and twice as Chief Minister of Haryana. His terms as chief minister were from 1975 to 1977 as a member of Congress, and for a few months in 1990 as member of Janata Dal. He was elected to the Rajya Sabha in April 1996. During his tenure as Member of Parliament (Rajya Sabha) he was appreciated by parliament for best use of MPLAD (aid given through Members of Parliament for the benefit of the public).

== Death and legacy ==
Gupta died on 29 August 2007 aged 90 in a hospital in Delhi after a fall.

Banarsi's son, Ajay Gupta, announced in 2007 that a foundation was to be created that would be in the name of his father. The Banarsi Das Gupta Foundation would focus on improving computer education in rural areas. Ajay is married to Darshana Gupta who is known for arranging mass weddings. The foundation is a registered NGO in Faridabad with Ajay as the chair, and Darshana as the secretary.
