= All India Vaishya Federation =

All India Vaish Federation (AIVF) is an international organization that was established in 1981 to promote the interests of the Vaishya community. Gireesh Kumar Sanghi, an ex-member of Indian parliament, is the national president of AIVF, while Indrajyoti Dasgupta is the vice president.

All India Vaish Federation has district units in 20 states across India and overseas chapters in the USA, Canada, Japan, Thailand, and Dubai.

== History ==
AIVF was founded by Banarsi Das Gupta, an Indian parliamentarian and ex-Chief Minister of Haryana, on November 2, 1982. Banarsi Das Gupta was elected President of the newly established AIVF in a unanimous vote.

After Gupta, Rajni Ranjan Sahu, an ex-member of the Indian Parliament, became president. At present, Ramdas Agarwal, another former MP, is its president.

== Aims of AIVF ==
AIVF aims to unite all units of Vaish samaj spread all over India and to bring them on a common platform, to coordinate and connect various institutes and organizations of Vaish samaj, to work for social, political, and economical upliftment of the Vaish Community, and to establish a branch in every district. Additionally, AIVF makes efforts to raise awareness among youths and women about bad traditions to discourage traditions and fundamentalism.
