= Mohanlalganj =

Mohanlalganj Mohanlālganj
- Populated place
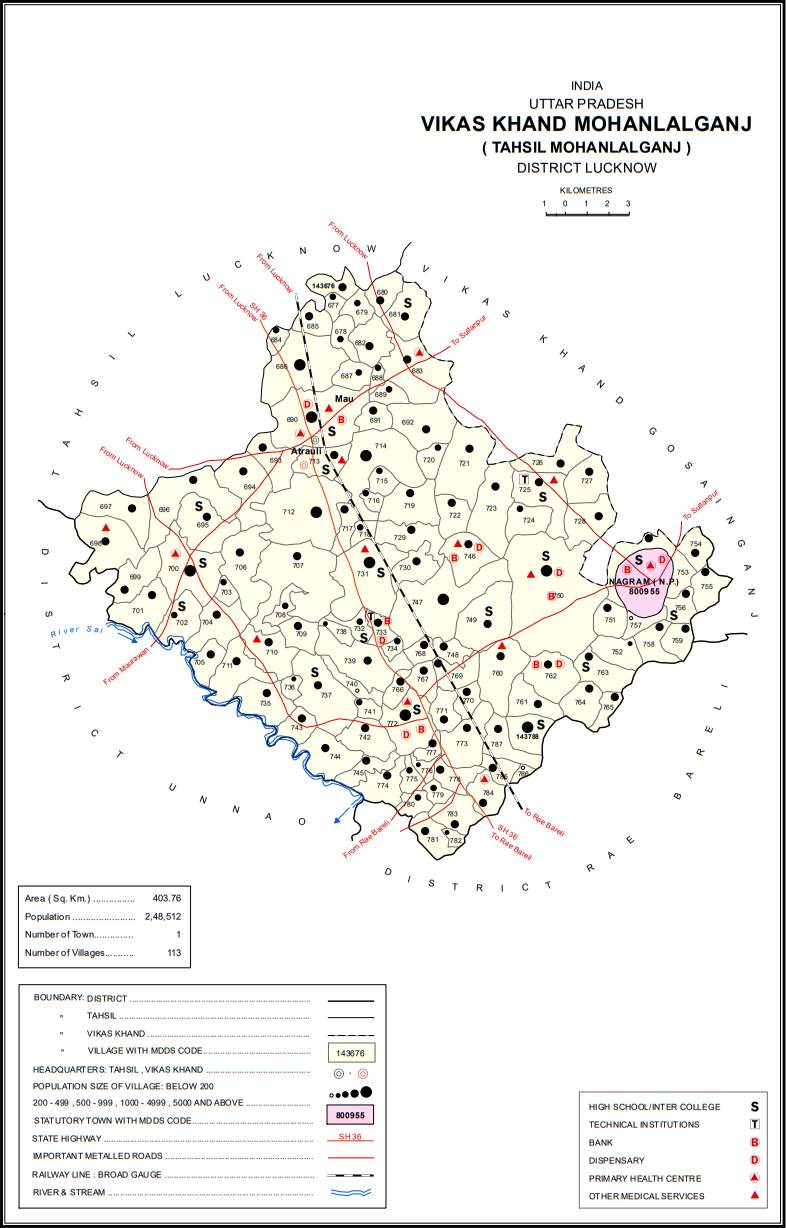
- Map of Mohanlalganj CD block

- Location in Uttar Pradesh, India Mohanlalganj (India)
- Coordinates: 26.67985°N 80.98237°E
- Country: India
- State: Uttar Pradesh
- District: Lucknow
- Elevation: 125 m (410 ft)

Languages
  - Official: Hindi
- Time zone: UTC+5:30 (IST)

Mohanlalganj is a tehsil and community development block in Lucknow district, Uttar Pradesh, India. It has historically constituted part of the village of Mau.

== History ==
The eponymous market, called Mohanlalganj, was established in 1859 by Raja Kashi Parshad and named after his father-in-law, Mohan Lal, from whom he had received his estate. Kashi Parshad had spent 50,000 rupees to finance its construction, and later additions costing a further 30,000 rupees were made, including drains and masonry verandas. At the turn of the 20th century, the Mohanlalganj bazaar was described as an important commercial center, mainly for grain and cloth, and its entrances were marked by two grand archways. Kashi Parshad also built a 250-foot-tall temple for one lakh (100,000) rupees; the temple was built from brick and given a veneer of marble and black stone.

Mohanlalganj historically was the seat of a pargana, having succeeded Amethi in this capacity.

== Villages ==
Mohanlalganj block comprises the following 113 villages:

Village name	Total land area (hectares)	Population (in 2011)
Sarthuwa	225.4	1,194
Mohiuddinpur	91.7	807
Shivdhara	151.2	975
Puranpur	151.4	981
Daudnagar	223.7	1,192
Perehta	382.6	3,435
Dahiyar	228.2	2,444
Khujauli	692.6	4,666
Harikansh Garhi	106.7	738
Dalauna	232	1,252
Purseni	815.9	5,037
Inderjeet Khera	177.8	610
Dharmawat Khera	56.2	599
Dharamgad Khera	132.5	546
Mau (contains block headquarters)	956.2	13,655
Rambhan Khera	233.3	1,514
Khujehra	529.4	2,310
Dehwa	357.6	2,781
Bhasanda	498.5	3,358
Uttaar Gaon	565.2	3,518
Bhaudhari	690	3,227
Dhanuwa Sand	448.8	2,310
Bhadeshwa	658.6	2,902
Kodara Raypur	343.7	2,252
Sisandi	747.7	6,804
Sulsamau	544.5	2,775
Minapur	290.4	936
Bhilampur	98.2	779
Devareya (Bharsawa)	407.6	2,659
Miranpur	219	1,377
Gobindpur	643.8	2,440
Jabrauli	998.9	4,107
Gautam Khera	228.3	919
Paraspur Thaththa	345.4	1,236
Kushmaura	406	2,095
Barbaliya	427.8	1,775
Gaura	655.9	5,160
Atrauli	358.6	2,971
Hulas Khera	811.1	5,049
Dada Sikandarpur	128.7	902
Gadiyana	73.2	859
Bindaua	204	1,378
Ahmadpur Khalsa	131.7	711
Kura	483.4	1,784
Gaureya Khurd	181	738
Dewati	827.2	2,358
Kubhara	243.9	1,654
Tamoriya	612	2,086
Madarpur	262	512
Karora	505.9	3,289
Achalikhera	362.5	1,959
Jamalpur Daduri	361.5	1,451
Balsingh Khera	363.1	1,777
Mehdauli	339.2	1,507
Garhi	320.3	3,427
Kankaha	935.8	6,460
Madapur	132	966
Mastipur	109.3	1,472
Tikara	87.4	692
Mangteya	438.1	2,692
Bhajmar Mau	87.5	285
Dayal Pur	723.6	4,877
Baddhi Khera	85.3	459
Sirsa	508.8	4,173
Harnam Khera	121.2	11
Madari Khera	91.6	535
Raghunath Khera	286.2	1,688
Akbarpur Beniganj	202.9	1,125
Rati	439.5	2,190
Birsinghpur	312	1,592
Kamalpur Bichlika	374	2,138
Utrawan	1,139.2	8,316
Dedhari	158.9	1,309
Patauna	577.8	2,274
Samesi	2,143.1	11,646
Shahmohammadpur Apaeya	201.3	1,482
Ahmadpur Ajamli	151.1	497
Nagram	1,282	3,485
Kakorwa	207.3	1,391
Amba Muratajapur	248.3	1,505
Aslam Nagar	166.7	1,104
Katra Nagram	231.5	1
Abbas Nagar	353.5	1,133
Garna	192.4	1,414
Meerakh Nagar	550.8	4,260
Kata Karaudi	308.6	2,174
Salempur Achaka	429.5	1,576
Chhatauni	333	2,037
Kaneri	301.6	1,671
Hasanpur	132.8	1,368
Bhawa Khera	121	1,703
Uday Pur	268.6	1,270
Brahmedas Pur	177.1	1,093
Rampur Garhi Jamuni	286.2	2,001
Karan Pur	171.9	1,464
Bairisal Pur	111.8	1,840
Nigohan	639.9	6,474
Sherpur Lawal	503	2,901
Adhaeya	154.4	1,056
Harihar Pur Par--Sa	186.7	669
Amleha Khera	84.9	337
Bhagwan Pur	106.5	1,331
Lalpur	162.3	1,217
Ratana Pur	100.8	909
Bhatwara	141.4	603
Nadauli	276.8	1,511
Khuddi Khera	60.9	488
Puraheya	294.7	2,113
Dakhena Sekhpur	219.1	1,784
Badhauna	160.8	1,113
Jamoriya	52.4	105
Ramdas Pur	277.5	1,375
Natauli	240.7	5,380
