= Premiership of V. P. Singh =

VP Singh's government

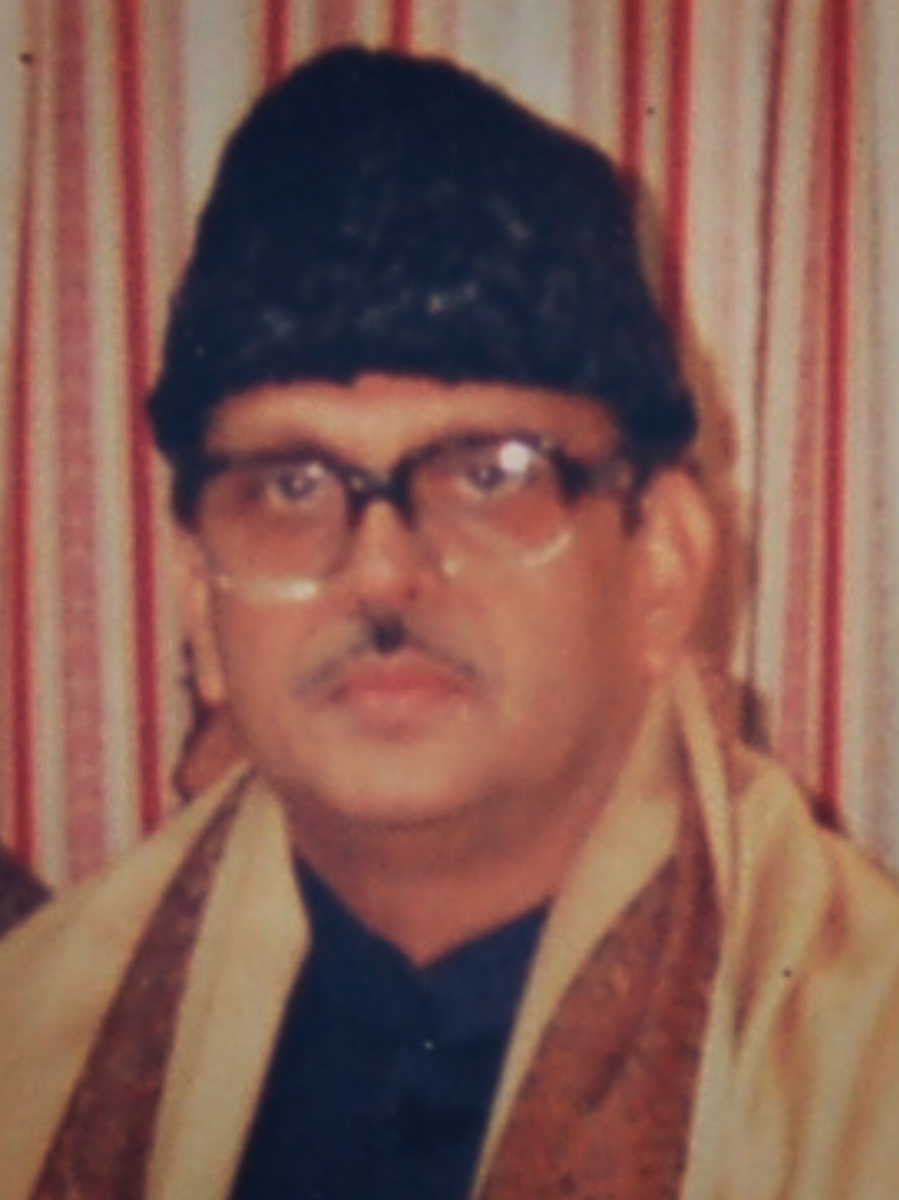
- Premiership of Vishwanath Pratap Singh; 2 December 1989 – 10 November 1990
- President: Ramaswamy Venkataraman
- Vice President: Shankar Dayal Sharma
- Cabinet: V. P. Singh ministry
- Party: Janata Dal
- Election: 1989 Indian general election
- Seat: Fatehpur (Lok Sabha constituency)
- National emblem of India

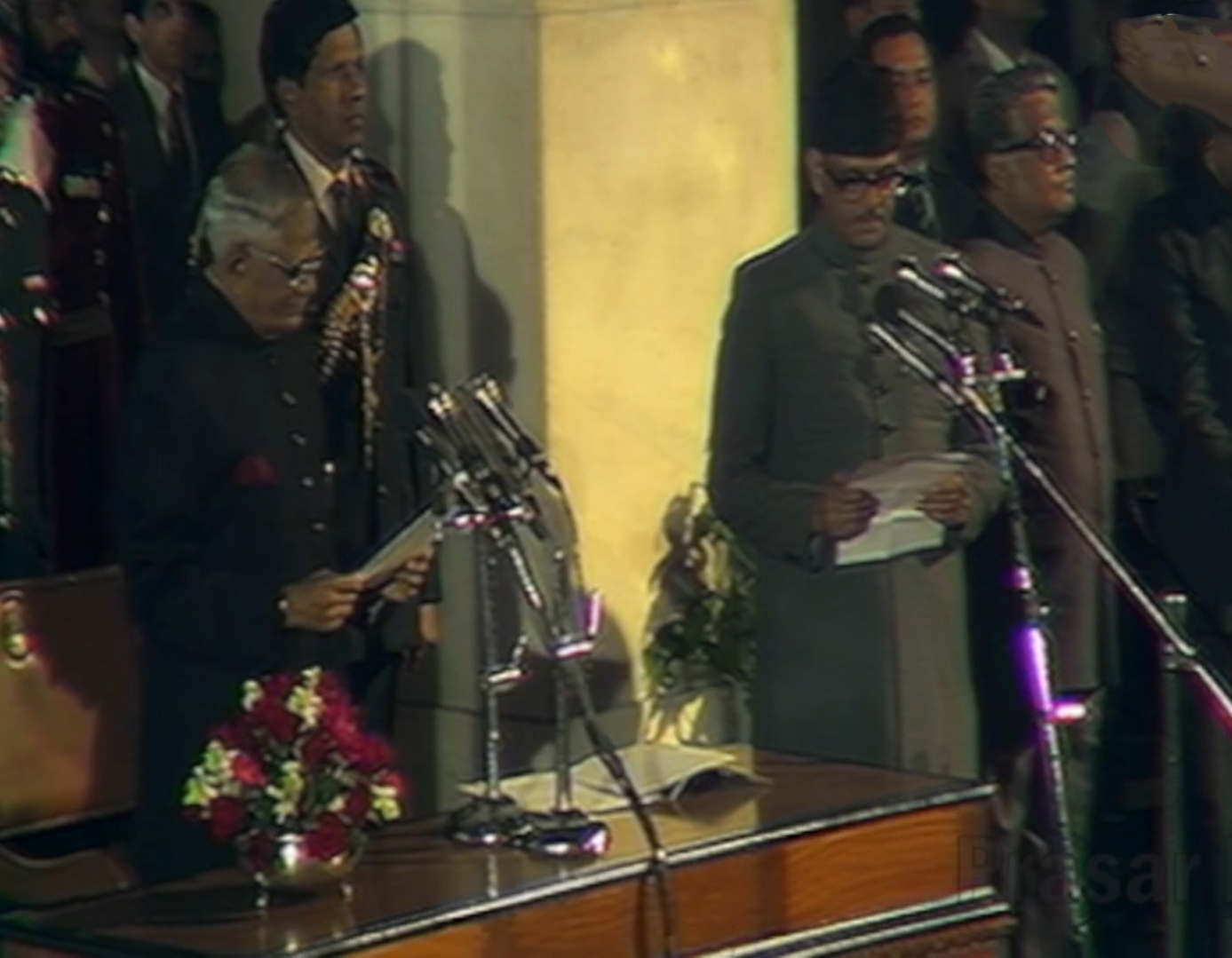
Vishwanath Pratap Singh taking the oath of office as India's 8th Prime Minister on 2 December 1989

Vishwanath Pratap Singh held office for slightly less than a year, from 2 December 1989 to 10 November 1990. After state legislative elections in March 1990, Singh's governing coalition achieved control of both houses of India's parliament. Singh becomes the 7th Prime Minister of India, after the loss of Rajiv Gandhi in the 1989 Indian general election. Singh's newly formed National Front (India) won 143 seats in the Lok Sabha and was supported by Bharatiya Janata Party from outside.

Under his premiership there were made many bold acts such as Mandal commission, which lead to a nation-wide protests and also social empowerment act like SC and ST Act, 1989. The exodus of Kashmiri Hindus was also a turning effect for his voting side. There was also a tussle between him and Reliance Industries.

His tenure ended on 10 November 1990, after Bharatiya Janata Party withdrew their support after stoppage of Ram Rath Yatra and arrest of party president, L. K. Advani. Chandra Shekhar immediately seized the moment and left the Janata Dal with several of his own supporters (including Devi Lal, Janeshwar Mishra, HD Deve Gowda, Maneka Gandhi, Ashoke Kumar Sen, Subodh Kant Sahay, Om Prakash Chautala, Hukam Singh, Chimanbhai Patel, Mulayam Singh Yadav, Yashwant Sinha, VC Shukla, and Sanjay Singh) to form the Samajwadi Janata Party/Janata Dal (Socialist). Although Chandra Shekhar had a mere 64 MPs, Rajiv Gandhi the leader of the Opposition, agreed to support him on the floor of the House; so he won a confidence motion and was sworn in as Prime Minister.

== Taking the office ==
Details of seats attained by Political party in 1989 Indian general election.

The 1989 Indian general elections were held because the previous Lok Sabha has been in power for five years, and the constitution allowed for new elections. Even though Rajiv Gandhi had won the last election by a landslide, this election saw him trying to fight off scandals that had marred his administration. (Note: 1989 elections were considered as a lucky charm for the Singh in the politics on defeating the Rajiv Gandhi.)

The Bofors scandal, rising terrorism in Punjab, the civil war between LTTE and Sri Lankan government were just some of the problems that stared at Rajiv's government. (Note: After the Bofors scandal, Singh one of the biggest mates of Rajiv Gandhi became his biggest critic.(Mustafa, p. 78)) Singh was Rajiv's biggest critic was, who had held the portfolios of the finance ministry and the defense ministry in the government.

But Singh was soon sacked from the Cabinet and he then resigned from his memberships in the Congress and the Lok Sabha. He formed the Jan Morcha with Arun Nehru and Arif Mohammad Khan and re-entered the Lok Sabha from Allahabad. Witnessing V P Singh's meteoric rise on the national stage, Rajiv tried to counter him with another prominent Rajput stalwart Satyendra Narain Singh but failed eventually.

Singh, who was the head of the Janata Dal, was chosen leader of the National Front government. And on 26 November he sworn the position.

== Timeline ==
- 26 November 1989 - Singh's coalition of parties won 143 seats and was supported by Bharatiya Janata Party.
- 2 December 1989 - Singh swore as the 8th Prime Minister of India.
- 8 December 1989 - 1989 kidnapping of Rubaiya Sayeed by Kashmiri militants.
- 13 December 1989 - Release of 5 terrorists of Jammu Kashmir Liberation Front.
- 16 December 1989 - Passing of Sixty-second Amendment of the Constitution of India in Lok Sabha.
- 29 December 1989 - Passing of Scheduled Caste and Scheduled Tribe (Prevention of Atrocities) Act, 1989.
- 21 January 1990 – 13 February 1990 - Insurgency in Kashmir on Hindus increased leading to mass exodus.
- 29 July 1990 - Implementation of Mandal Commission.
- August 1990 - Mandal Commission protests of 1990 all over the nation.
- 19 September 1990 - Self-immolation of Rajiv Goswami.
- 12 September 1990 - Starting of Ram Rath Yatra by L. K. Advani.
- 23 October 1990 - Arrest of L. K. Advani on order of Singh.
- 30 October 1990 - Anti-Singh movement in BJP.
- 7 November 1990 - Resignation of Singh after no-confidence with a vote of 356 to 151.

== See also ==
- V. P. Singh ministry
- Vishwanath Pratap Singh

== Bibliography ==
- Mustafa, Seema (1995). The Lonely Prophet: V.P. Singh, a Political Biography. University of Michigan, Ann Arbor, Michigan: SAGE Publishing. ISBN 8122408095. OCLC 33664491.
- Hewitt, Vernon (2007). Political Mobilisation and Democracy in India(States of Emergency). Taylor & Francis. ISBN 9781134097623.
