= Janata Dal =

Former political party in India, 1988–1999

- Abbreviation: JD
- Founder: V. P. Singh
- Founded: 11 October 1988 (38 years ago)
- Dissolved: 2003
- Merger of: Jan Morcha; Janata Party faction; Lok Dal faction; Congress (Jagjivan); Thamizhaga Munnetra Munnani
- Succeeded by: Samata Party; Janata Dal (Socialist); Janata Dal (Secular); Janata Dal (United); Loktantrik Janata Dal; Rashtriya Janata Dal; Rashtriya Lok Dal; Biju Janata Dal; Rashtriya Lok Morcha; Indian National Lok Dal; Lok Janshakti Party (Ram Vilas); Rashtriya Lok Janshakti Party; Samajwadi Party; (Janata Parivar)
- Ideology: Social democracy
- Political position: Centre
- National affiliation: National Front (1988–1996); United Front (1996–1998)
- Colours: Green

Janata Dal (JD; lit. 'People's Party') was an Indian political party which was formed through the merger of Lok Dal, Jagjivan's Congress, and Jan Morcha on 11 October 1988—the birth anniversary of Jayaprakash Narayan under the leadership of V. P. Singh.

== History ==
V. P. Singh united the entire disparate spectrum of parties ranging from regional parties such as the Telugu Desam Party, the Dravida Munnetra Kazhagam, and the Asom Gana Parishad, and formed the National Front with N. T. Rama Rao as president and Singh as convenor. The front also included outside support from the right-wing Bharatiya Janata Party and the left-wing Left Front, led by the Communist Party of India and Communist Party of India (Marxist). They defeated Rajiv Gandhi's Congress (I) in the 1989 parliamentary elections. His government fell after Lalu Prasad Yadav got Advani arrested in Samastipur and stopped his Ram Rath Yatra, which was going to Ayodhya to the site of the Babri Masjid on 23 October 1990, and the Bharatiya Janata Party withdrew support. Singh lost a parliamentary vote of confidence on 7 November 1990. In the 1991 Indian general election the Janata Dal lost power but emerged as the third largest party in the Lok Sabha. The Janata Dal-led United Front formed the government after the 1996 Indian general election with the outside support of the Indian National Congress. However, after this the Janata Dal gradually disintegrated into various smaller factions, which largely became regional parties such as Biju Janata Dal, Rashtriya Janata Dal, Janata Dal (Secular) and Janata Dal (United).

== Ascent to power ==
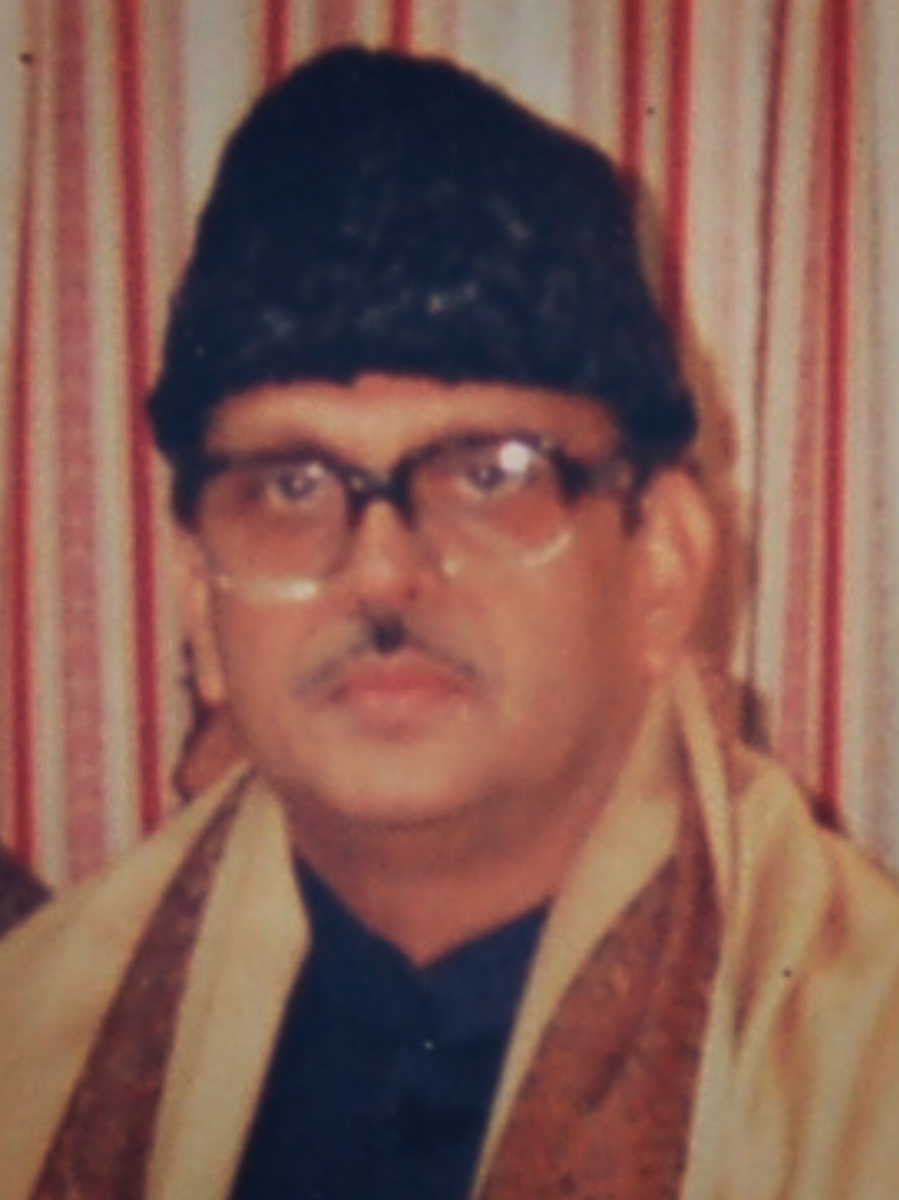
V. P. Singh

It first came to power in 1989, after cases of corruption, known as the Bofors scandal, caused Rajiv Gandhi's Congress (I) to lose the elections. The National Front coalition that was formed consisted of the Janata Dal and a few smaller parties in the government, and had outside support from the Left Front and the Bharatiya Janata Party. V. P. Singh was the prime minister. In November 1990, this coalition collapsed, and a new government headed by Chandra Shekhar under Samajwadi Janata Party (Rashtriya) which had the support of the Congress came to power for a short while. Two days before the vote, Chandra Shekhar, an ambitious Janata Dal rival who had been kept out of the National Front government, joined with Devi Lal, a former deputy prime minister under V. P. Singh, to form the Samajwadi Janata Party, with a total of sixty Lok Sabha members. The day after the collapse of the National Front government, Chandra Shekhar informed the president that by gaining the backing of the Congress (I) and its electoral allies he enjoyed the support of 280 members of the Lok Sabha, and he demanded the right to constitute a new government. Even though his rump party accounted for only one-ninth of the members of the Lok Sabha, Chandra Shekhar succeeded in forming a new minority Government and becoming prime minister (with Devi Lal as deputy prime minister). However, Chandra Shekhar's government fell less than four months later, after the Congress (I) withdrew its support.

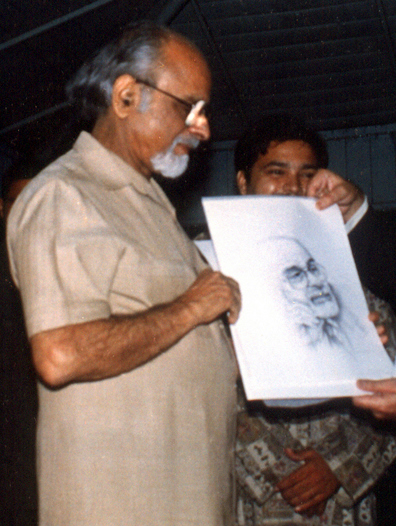
I. K. Gujral

Its second spell of power began in 1996, when the Janata Dal-led United Front coalition came to power, with outside support from the Congress under Sitaram Kesri, choosing H. D. Deve Gowda as their prime minister. The Congress withdrew its support in less than a year, after the Deve Gowda Government restarted probing the corruption cases against a lot of Congress leaders, hoping to gain power with the support of various United Front constituent groups, and I. K. Gujral became the next prime minister. His government too fell in a few months, and in February 1998, the Janata Dal-led coalition lost power to the Bharatiya Janata Party in general elections.

== Party presidents ==
No.	Portrait	Presidents	Year	Duration
1		Vishwanath Pratap Singh	1989-1997	days
2		Sharad Yadav	1997-1999	days

== National leadership ==
=== Vice president ===
No.	Portrait	Vice president	Year	Duration
1		Krishan Kant	21 August 1997 – 27 July 2002	4 years, 340 days

=== Prime minister ===
No.	Image	Prime ministers	Year	Duration	Constituency
1		Vishwanath Pratap Singh	1989 – 1990	343 days	Fatehpur
2		H. D. Deve Gowda	1996 – 1997	324 days	—N/a (Rajya Sabha MP) from Karnataka
3		Inder Kumar Gujral	1997 – 1998	332 days	—N/a (Rajya Sabha MP) from Bihar

=== Deputy Prime Minister of India ===
No.	Portrait	Deputy prime minister	Year	Duration
1		Devi Lal	10 November 1990 – 21 June 1991	242 Days

== State leadership ==
=== Chief minister ===
No.	Portrait	Chief ministers	State	Year	Duration
1		Mulayam Singh Yadav	Uttar Pradesh		
2		Chimanbhai Patel	Gujarat		
3		Lalu Prasad Yadav	Bihar		
4		Biju Patnaik	Odisha		
5		H. D. Deve Gowda	Karnataka		
6		J. H. Patel	Karnataka		
7		Devi Lal	Haryana		
8		Om Prakash Chautala	Haryana		
9		Banarsi Das Gupta	Haryana		
10		Hukum Singh	Haryana		

=== Deputy chief minister ===
No.	Portrait	Deputy chief minister	State	Year	Duration
1		Banarsi Das Gupta	Haryana		
2		Hukam Singh	Haryana		
3		J. H. Patel	Karnataka		
4		K. Siddaramaiah	Karnataka		

== Electoral records ==
Electoral performance
Year	Seats won		Votes	
1989 Indian general election	143	▲143	53,518,521	▲53,518,521
1991 Indian general election	59	▼84	32,628,400	▼2,08,90,121
1996 Indian general election	46	▼13	27,070,340	▼55,58,060
1998 Indian general election	6	▼40	11,930,209	▼1,51,40,131
Party Disintegrated

== National and state units ==
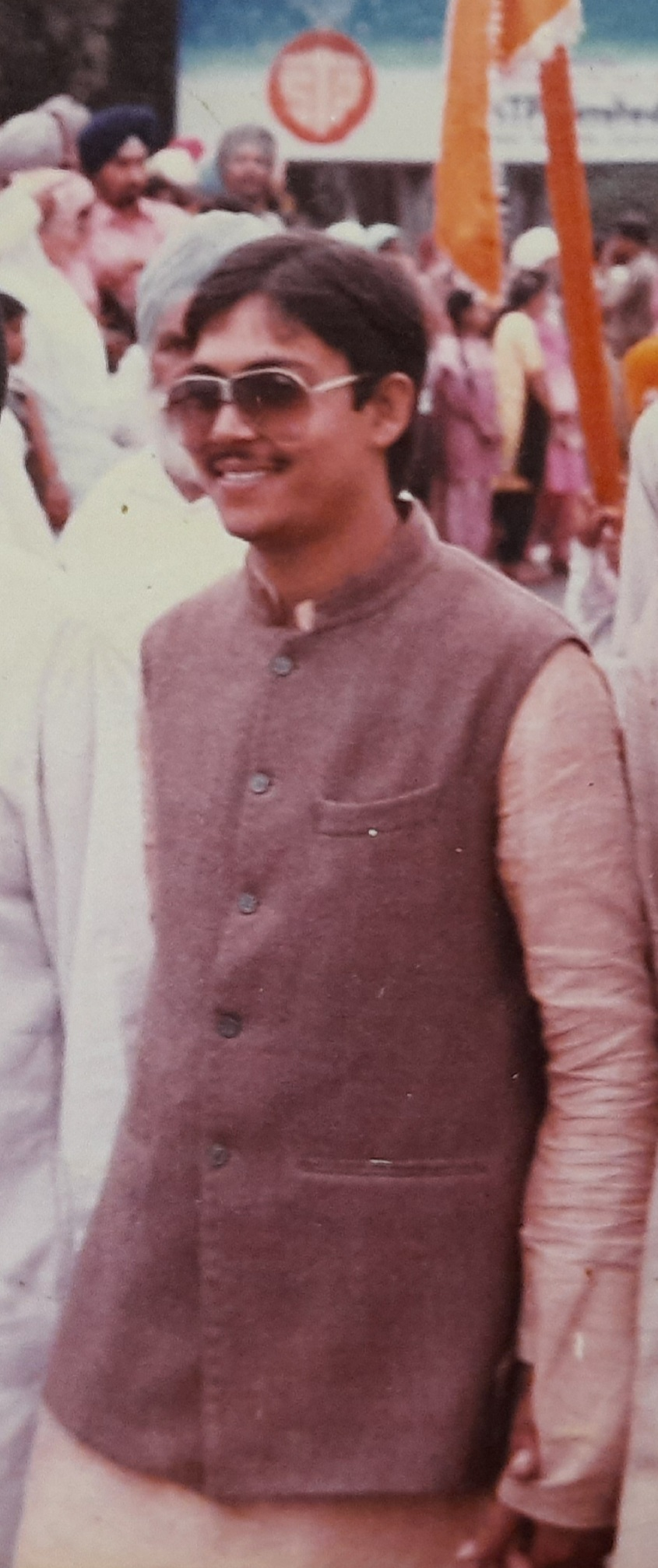
Thakur Ji Pathak

- National general secretary

=== State units ===
- Uttar Pradesh

Anantram Jaiswal (1983)

- Karnataka

=== Presidents ===
B. Rachaiah (1989)

Siddaramaiah (Feb 1999)

C. Byre Gowda (July 1999)

=== General secretary ===
Jeevaraj Alva (1989–1990)

C. Narayanaswamy (1999)

- Tamil Nadu
  - President

Sivaji Ganesan (1989–1993)

== Factions ==
Party name	Led by	Formed		Remarks	
Pro-NDA parties
Rashtriya Lok Dal	Chaudhary Jayant Singh	1996		State Party in Uttar Pradesh	
Janata Dal (Secular)	H. D. Deve Gowda	1999		State Party in Karnataka	
Janata Dal (United)	Nitish Kumar	2003	Merger of Janata Dal (United) led by Sharad Yadav and Samata Party led by Nitish Kumar	State Party in Bihar & Manipur	
Hindustani Awam Morcha (Secular)	Jitan Ram Manjhi	2015	Split from Janata Dal (United)	State party in Bihar	
Lok Janshakti Party (Ram Vilas)	Chirag Paswan	2021	Factioned from Lok Janshakti Party	State Party in Bihar & Nagaland	
Rashtriya Lok Morcha	Upendra Kushwaha	2023	Split from Janata Dal (United)	Unrecognised Party	
Pro-I.N.D.I.A. parties
Samajwadi Party	Akhilesh Yadav	1992		State Party in Uttar Pradesh and recognised in Maharashtra	
Rashtriya Janata Dal	Lalu Prasad Yadav	1997		-	Non-NDA/I.N.D.I.A. parties
Biju Janata Dal	Naveen Patnaik	1997		State Party in Odisha	
Indian National Lok Dal	Om Prakash Chautala	1996		Unrecognised Party	
Jannayak Janta Party	Ajay Singh Chautala	2018	Split from Indian National Lok Dal	Recognised Party	
Rashtriya Lok Janshakti Party	Pashupati Kumar Paras	2021	Factioned from Lok Janshakti Party	Recognised Party	

=== Defunct parties ===
- Jan Adhikar Party (Loktantrik) led by Pappu Yadav (merged with Indian National Congress).
- Samajwadi Janata Party (Rashtriya) of Late Chandra Shekhar is now defunct because of weak leadership.
- Samajwadi Janata Dal (Democratic) led by Devendra Prasad Yadav (merged with Rashtriya Janata Dal).
- Bharatiya Sablog Party led by Arun Kumar (merged with Lok Janshakti Party (Ram Vilas)).
- Lok Janshakti Party of Late Ram Vilas Paswan and led by Chirag Paswan (split into the Lok Janshakti Party (Ram Vilas) led by Ram's son Chirag Paswan, and the Rashtriya Lok Janshakti Party led by Ram's brother Pashupati Kumar Paras).
- Rashtriya Lok Samta Party led by Upendra Kushwaha (merged with Janata Dal United).
- Loktantrik Janata Dal led by Late Sharad Yadav (merged with Rashtriya Janata Dal).
- Socialist Janata Party led by Manju Mohan (merged with Socialist Party (India)).
- Samras Samaj Party led by Nagmani (merged with Rashtriya Lok Samta Party).
- Samata Party of Late George Fernandes (merged with Janata Dal (United)).
- Socialist Janata (Democratic) led by Late M. P. Veerendra Kumar (merged with Janata Dal (United))
- Jan Morcha of Late V. P. Singh and led by Ajeya Pratap Singh (merged with Indian National Congress).
- Odisha Jan Morcha is defunct because of weak leadership.
- Odisha Gana Parishad led by Bijoy Mohapatra (merged with Nationalist Congress Party).
- All India Progressive Janata Dal led by Late Ramakrishna Hegde and late S. R. Bommai (merged with Janata Dal (United)).
- Janata Dal (Left) led by Late Surendra Mohan and Late M. P. Veerendra Kumar (merged with Janata Dal (Secular)).
- Lok Shakti led by Late Ramakrishna Hegde (merged with Janata Dal (United)).
- Pragatisheel Samajwadi Party (Lohiya) led by Shivpal Singh Yadav (merged with Samajwadi Party).
- Janata Dal (Gujarat) led by Late Chimanbhai Patel and Late Chhabildas Mehta (merged with Indian National Congress).
- Janata Dal (Digvijay) led by Digvijay Singh (merged with Bharatiya Janata Party).
- Janata Dal (Ajit) led by Late Ajit Singh (merged with Indian National Congress).
- Janata Dal (Socialist) led by Late Chandra Shekhar, Late Devi Lal, Late Mulayam Singh Yadav (renamed as Late Samajwadi Janata Party (Rashtriya)).
- Punjab Janata Morcha (PJM), in English the Punjab Popular Front, was a Sikh political party in the Indian state of Punjab. The party formed in 1989 as a splinter group of the Janata Dal. The party failed to win any election seats in its lifetime. Party president Kirpal Singh announced that the PJM was disbanded in 1997. Most members joined the Jan Morcha by 2003.

== Dissolution ==
In August 1999, the Janata Dal (United) was formally designated by the Election Commission of India (ECI) following a legal dispute over the name and symbol of the original Janata Dal. August 3, 1999: The Election Commission held a final hearing to listen to rival claims from factions led by Sharad Yadav (who wanted to join the NDA) and H.D. Deve Gowda (who opposed the move). August 4, 1999: The Election Commission issued an order freezing the original "Chakra (Wheel)" symbol of the Janata Dal. To resolve the immediate need for election identities for the upcoming general election, the ECI granted "ad-hoc recognition" to the two splinter groups: The Sharad Yadav-led faction was designated as Janata Dal (United). The H.D. Deve Gowda-led faction was designated as Janata Dal (Secular). Context of the Formation The split actually began on July 21, 1999, when those opposed to the BJP-led National Democratic Alliance expelled Sharad Yadav from the presidency and elected Deve Gowda in his place. The August 4th ruling effectively legalized the existence of the JD(U) as a distinct political entity for the 1999 elections. While the designation Janata Dal (United) appeared in August 1999, the party was reconstituted on its most widely recognized foundation date, October 30, 2003, through a formal merger with the Samata Party and Lok Shakti.

== See also ==
- Samata Party
- List of Janata Dal breakaway parties
