= Manda (zamindari) =

Zamindari estate in British India

Zamindari of Manda
- 1848–1947
- Status: Zamindari
- Common languages: Hindi
- Religion: Hinduism
- Demonym: Indian
- Raja Bahadur of Manda
  - 1835 (first): Raja Ram Pratap Singh
  - 1941-1947 (last): Vishwanath Pratap Singh
- History
  - Established: 1848
  - Earliest records: 1835
  - Independence of India (end of reign): 1947

Area
  - Total: 1,200 km^{2} (460 sq mi)
Preceded by	Succeeded by
Manikpur	India

Manda was a zamindari, with lands located near Allahabad, Uttar Pradesh, in northern India.

== History ==
The Manda Zamindari controlled approximately: 300 to 350 villages and it was one of the large taluqdari estates in eastern UP under British rule.

The predecessor state of Manikpur was founded in 1795 by Raja Manik Chand, descendant of Raja Jai Chand of Kannauj. Raja Gudan Deo, descent from Raja Manik Chand, established his capital at Manda in 1835. Raja Ram Pratap Singh was granted the hereditary title of Raja Bahadur by the British Raj in January 1913. The Last Raja Bahadur of Manda, Ram Gopal Singh, adopted a son named Vishwanath Pratap Singh, who became the 7th Prime Minister of India. (Note: He was adopted by Raja Gopal Singh of Manda and became the heir-apparent. He became the Raja of Manda at the age of 10 in 1941.) There is Manda Khas village near this fort and this fort is situated at a distance of about 500 meters from Police Station Manda. There are also Bharari II, Gauraiya Khurd, Bharatganj villages, hundreds of tourists come here every day.

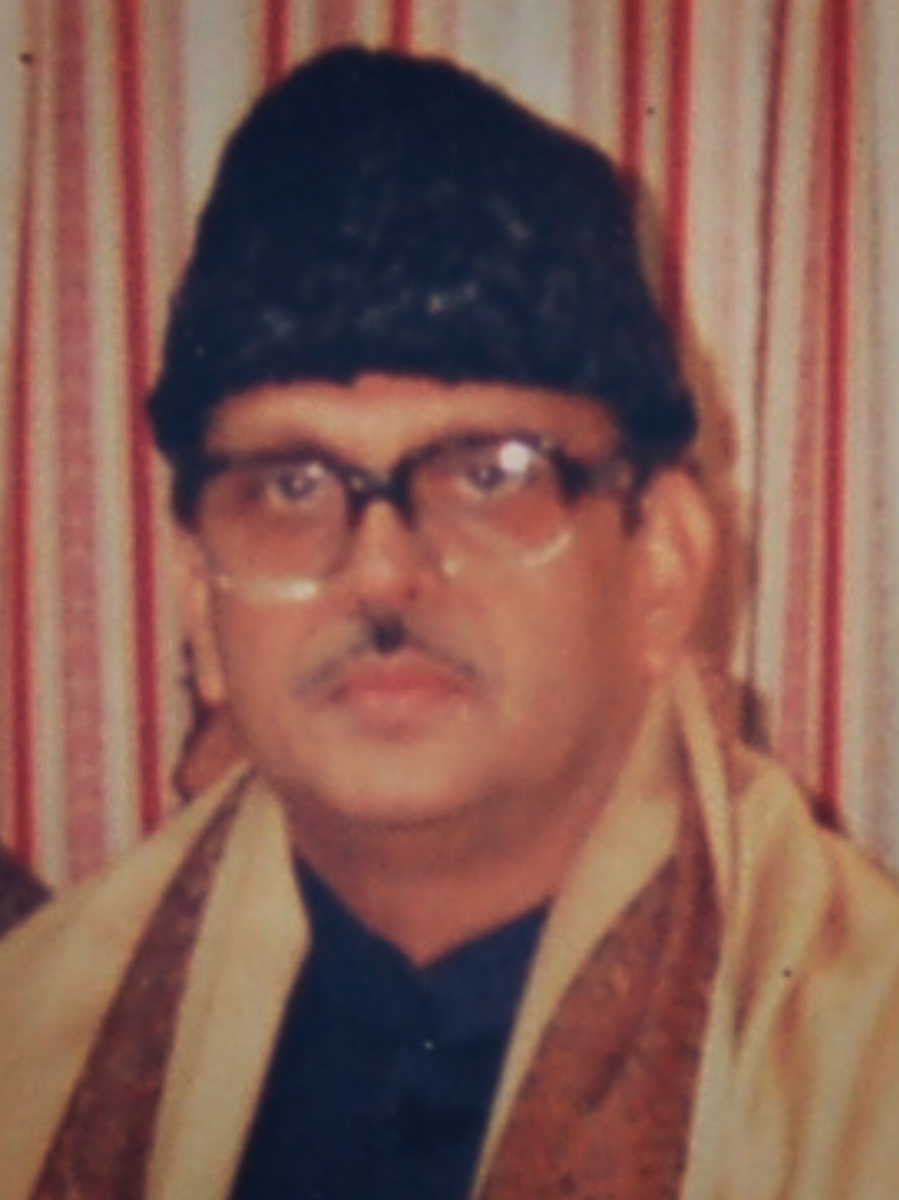
VP Singh, was the 41st Zamindar of Manda.

== Modern scenario ==
After India got Independence in 1947, as per Indian Union Act (1947) the state merged with Republic of India, and the state was abolished. The first Raja was VP Singh and was the 41st Zamindar and after his death, his son Ajeya Pratap Singh is the 42nd and current Zamindar of the Zamindari.

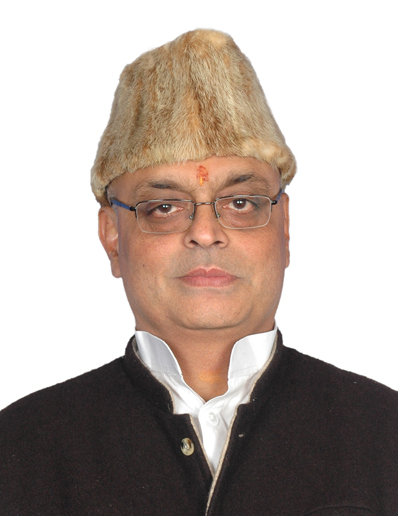
Ajeya Pratap Singh, is 42nd Zamindar of Manda zamindari.
