= V. P. Singh =

Prime Minister of India from 1989 to 1990

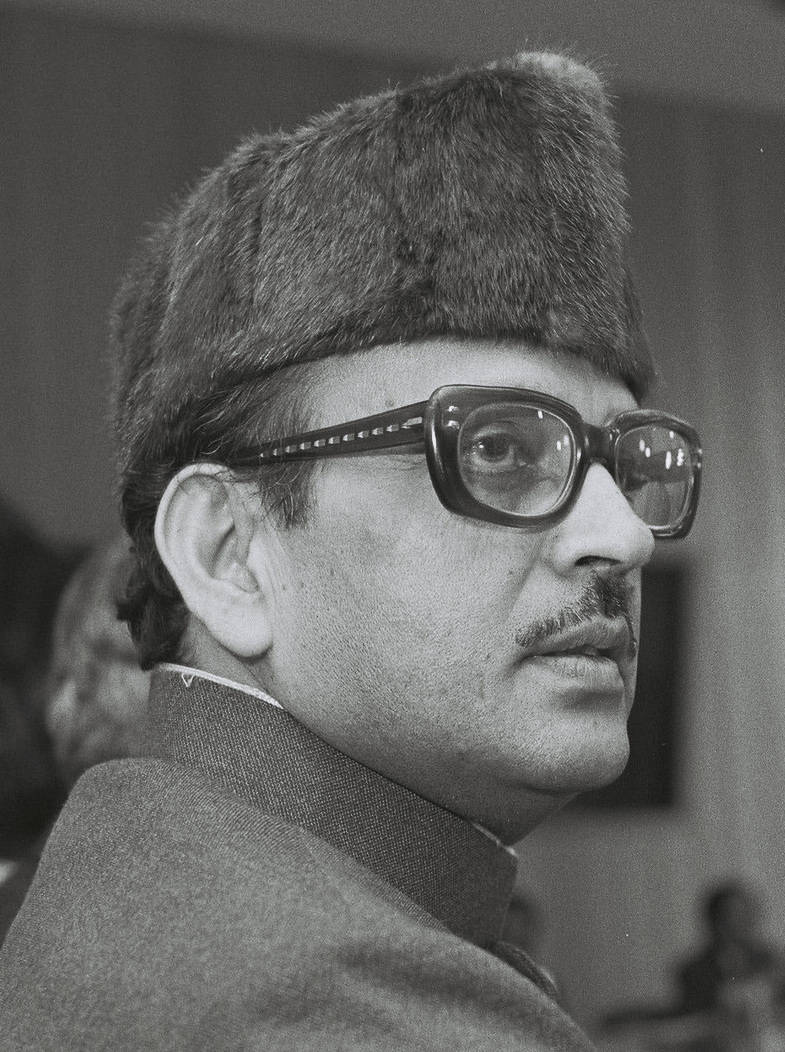
- V. P. Singh in 1983

Prime Minister of India
- In office 2 December 1989 – 10 November 1990
- President: Ramaswamy Venkataraman
- Vice President: Shankar Dayal Sharma
- Deputy: Devi Lal (until August 1990)
- Preceded by: Rajiv Gandhi
- Succeeded by: Chandra Shekhar

Union Minister of External Affairs
- In office 2 December 1989 – 5 December 1989
- Prime Minister: Himself
- Preceded by: P. V. Narasimha Rao
- Succeeded by: Inder Kumar Gujral

Union Minister of Defence
- In office 2 December 1989 – 10 November 1990
- Prime Minister: Himself
- Preceded by: K. C. Pant
- Succeeded by: Chandra Shekhar
- In office 24 January 1987 – 12 April 1987
- Prime Minister: Rajiv Gandhi
- Preceded by: Rajiv Gandhi
- Succeeded by: K. C. Pant

Union Minister of Finance
- In office 31 December 1984 – 23 January 1987
- Prime Minister: Rajiv Gandhi
- Preceded by: Pranab Mukherjee
- Succeeded by: Rajiv Gandhi

Leader of the House in Rajya Sabha
- In office December 1984 – April 1987
- Preceded by: Pranab Mukherjee
- Succeeded by: Narayan Datt Tiwari

Chief Minister of Uttar Pradesh
- In office 9 June 1980 – 19 July 1982
- Governor: Chandeshwar Prasad Narayan Singh
- Preceded by: Banarsi Das
- Succeeded by: Sripati Mishra

Member of Parliament, Rajya Sabha
- In office 1983–1988
- Constituency: Uttar Pradesh

Member of Parliament, Lok Sabha
- In office 1989–1996
- Preceded by: Hari Krishna Shastri
- Succeeded by: Vishambhar Prasad Nishad
- Constituency: Fatehpur, Uttar Pradesh
- In office 1980–1980
- Preceded by: Janeshwar Mishra
- Succeeded by: Krishna Prakash Tiwari
- Constituency: Allahabad, Uttar Pradesh
- In office 1988–1989
- Preceded by: Amitabh Bachchan
- Succeeded by: Janeshwar Mishra
- Constituency: Allahabad, Uttar Pradesh
- In office 1971–1977
- Preceded by: Janeshwar Mishra
- Succeeded by: Kamala Bahuguna
- Constituency: Phulpur, Uttar Pradesh

President of Jan Morcha
- In office 1988
- Preceded by: Office established
- Succeeded by: Raj Babbar

President of Janata Dal
- In office 1988–1997
- Preceded by: Office established
- Succeeded by: Sharad Yadav
- Pretender information
- Title(s): Raja Bahadur of Manda
- Pretend from: 1971–2008
- Monarchy abolished: Sovereign Monarchy; 1947 (Instrument of Accession); Titular Monarchy; 1971 (26th Amendment of the Indian Constitution)
- Successor: Ajeya Pratap Singh

Raja Bahadur of Manda
- Reign: 1941–1947
- Predecessor: Ram Gopal Singh
- Titular Reign: 1947–1971
- Born: Vishwanath Pratap Singh; 25 June 1931; Allahabad, United Provinces of Agra and Oudh, British India (present-day Prayagraj, Uttar Pradesh, India
- Died: 27 November 2008 (aged 77); New Delhi, Delhi, India
- Spouse: Sita Kumari (m. 1955)
- House: Gaharwar
- Education: Allahabad University (B.A, LL.B); University of Pune (B.Sc)
- Political party: Jan Morcha (2006–2008; 1987–1988)
- Other political affiliations: Indian National Congress (1969–1987); Janata Dal (1988–1999)
- Children: 2, including Ajeya Pratap Singh

Vishwanath Pratap Singh (25 June 1931 – 27 November 2008) was an Indian politician who served as the Prime Minister of India from 1989 to 1990 and the Raja Bahadur of Manda.

He was educated at Allahabad University and Fergusson College in Pune. In 1969, he joined the Indian National Congress party and was elected as a member of the Uttar Pradesh Legislative Assembly.

In the Rajiv Gandhi ministry, Singh was given various cabinet posts, including Minister of Finance and Minister of Defence. Singh was also the Leader of the Rajya Sabha from 1984 to 1987. During his tenure as Minister of Defence, the Bofors scandal came to light, and Singh resigned from the ministry. In 1988, he formed the Janata Dal party by merging various factions of the Janata Party. In the 1989 elections, the National Front, with the support of the Bharatiya Janata Party (BJP), formed the government and Singh became the prime minister.

During his tenure as prime minister, he implemented the Mandal Commission report for India's backward castes, which led to major protests against the act.

Under Singh's prime ministership in 1989, the Government of India released five terrorists in exchange for the release of kidnapped Rubaiya Sayeed, daughter of the Union Home Minister, Mufti Mohammad Sayeed. This was a turning point in the history of Kashmir militancy, which left a long lasting impact in Kashmir. In 1990 the exodus of Kashmiri Hindus from the valley of Kashmir took place.

Following his opposition to the Ram Rath Yatra, the BJP withdrew its support for the National Front, and his government lost the vote of no-confidence. Singh resigned on 7 November 1990. His prime ministerial tenure lasted for 343 days.

Singh was the prime ministerial candidate for the National Front in the 1991 elections, but was defeated. He spoke out against the Babri Masjid demolition in 1992. He turned down prime ministership after the 1996 Indian general election even though he was the first choice and relinquished the prime ministership to H. D. Deve Gowda. After 1996, Singh retired from political posts, but continued to remain a public figure and political critic. He was diagnosed with multiple myeloma in 1998, and ceased public appearances until the cancer went into remission in 2003. He died from complications of multiple myeloma and kidney failure in 2008. He was cremated with full state honours.

== Early life and education ==
Singh was born on 25 June 1931, the third child of the Hindu Rajput zamindar family of Gaharwar clan, in a village which is located on the banks of the Belan River in the Allahabad district. He was adopted by Raja Bahadur Ram Gopal Singh of Manda and became the heir-apparent. He became the Raja Bahadur of Manda at the age of 10 in 1941. His ancestors were rulers of the predecessor state of Manikpur, founded in 1180 by Raja Manik Chand, brother of Raja Jai Chand of Kannauj. (Note: The predecessor state of Manikpur was founded in 1180, by Raja Manik Chand, brother of Raja Jai Chand of Kannauj. Raja Gudan Deo, 16th in descent from Raja Manik Chand, established his capital at Manda in 1542. Raja Ram Pratap Singh was granted the hereditary title of Raja Bahadur by the British Raj in January 1913. The Last Raj Bahadur of Manda, Ram Gopal Singh, adopted a son named Vishwanath Pratap Singh, who became the 7th Prime Minister of India.) His family belonged to the Gaharwal clan of the Manda Zamindar.

He obtained his education from Colonel Brown Cambridge School, Dehradun, and got his Bachelor of Arts and Law degree from Allahabad University. He was elected the vice president of Allahabad University Students Union and later received a Bachelor of Science in physics from Fergusson College in the Pune University.

== Early political career ==
Singh was elected from Soraon to the Uttar Pradesh Legislative Assembly in 1969 as a member of the Congress Party and became the chief whip for the legislative party. He got elected to the Lok Sabha in 1971 and was appointed a Deputy Minister of Commerce by Prime Minister Indira Gandhi in 1974. He served as the Minister of Commerce in 1976–77.

=== Member of Lok Sabha ===
He was elected to Lok Sabha in 1971 from Phulpur. He lost from Allahabad in 1977, but won in 1980 as member of Indian National Congress. He resigned from Lok Sabha when he became Chief Minister of Uttar Pradesh in June 1980. After he resigned from Congress and quit as Rajya Sabha member in 1987, he entered Lok Sabha by winning the bye-poll for Allahabad seat vacated by Amitabh Bachchan. He was elected to Lok Sabha from Fatehpur in 1989 and became Prime Minister for 11 months. He was elected from Fatehpur again in 1991, the last time he contested any election.

=== Chief Minister of Uttar Pradesh ===
He was appointed as the Chief Minister of Uttar Pradesh in 1980 when Indira Gandhi was re-elected after the Janata interlude. As Chief Minister (1980–82), he cracked down hard on dacoity, a problem that was particularly severe in the rural districts of the southwest Uttar Pradesh. He received much favourable national publicity when he offered to resign following a self-professed failure to stamp out the problem, and again when he personally oversaw the surrender of some of the most feared dacoits of the area in 1983. The Behmai massacre provoked outrage across the country thereby causing V. P. Singh to resign in the wake of the killings as he was the chief minister under whom Phoolan Devi surrendered as he saved her life by instructing the police officers to not kill her in a police encounter to secure the votes of Dalits (though Phoolan's 22 gang members were killed). Singh was an upper caste man and had ruled the vote bank of upper-caste people in Uttar Pradesh for the Indian National Congress. He resumed his post as Minister of Commerce in 1983.

=== Leader of Rajya Sabha ===
After he resigned from the position of Chief Minister of Uttar Pradesh, he was appointed as the leader of Rajya Sabha in the year 1984 and remained so until 1987. Before him the position was assigned to Pranab Mukherjee, who was removed because he then formed his own party, Rashtriya Samajwadi Congress. After Singh's tenure this position was given to N. D. Tiwari. He resigned from Rajya Sabha when he left Congress in 1987.

== Administerial skill ==
He was considered very close to Rajiv Gandhi as well as Indira Gandhi and was loyal to them at a time when the experienced leaders of Congress Party founded a new party, Indian National Congress (Organisation), and empowered the party of Indian National Congress (Requisition). Singh was known as "Mr. Clean" because of his impeccable history and also because of his opposition for the corruption in Bofors deal, which lead the way for him to contest his own party to fight the 1989 Lok Sabha Election and become Prime Minister of India. Singh was responsible for managing the coalition of the Left parties and the Bharatiya Janata Party (BJP) against Rajiv Gandhi to dethrone him in the 1989 elections. He is remembered for the important role that he played in 1989 that changed the course of Indian politics. Singh acted boldly by issuing an arrest warrant against L. K. Advani midway through the latter's Rath Yatra.

== Ministries under Central Government ==
Singh has been on the list as one of the senior-most and most powerful leaders of the Indian National Congress and has held many important ministry positions such as Defence, External Affairs and Finance. (Note: Vishwanath Singh, was one of the most trusted and noble member of Indian National Congress, under the Indira Gandhi and Rajiv Gandhi holding important ministries in the central government.)

=== Minister of Finance (1984–1987) ===
He was called to New Delhi following Rajiv Gandhi's mandate in the 1984 general election. Singh was appointed to the post of Finance Minister in the tenth Cabinet of India, where he oversaw the gradual relaxation of the License Raj (governmental regulation) as Gandhi had in mind. During his term as Finance Minister, he oversaw the reduction of gold smuggling by reducing gold taxes and giving the police a portion of the confiscated gold. He also gave extraordinary powers to the Enforcement Directorate of the Finance Ministry, the wing of the ministry charged with tracking down tax evaders, then headed by Bhure Lal. Singh's efforts to reduce government regulation of business and to prosecute tax fraud attracted widespread praise.

Following a number of high-profile raids on suspected evaders – including Dhirubhai Ambani and Amitabh Bachchan – Gandhi was forced to sack him as Finance Minister, possibly because many of the raids were conducted on industrialists who had supported the Congress financially in the past. However, Singh's popularity was at such a pitch that only a sideways move seemed to have been possible, to the Defence Ministry (in January 1987). Then he succeeded his position to Rajiv Gandhi.

=== Minister of Defence (1987) ===
In the year 1987, Singh was appointed on the position of Defence Minister of India for the first time but only for a period less than 3 months from 24 January 1987 to 12 April 1987. He was at that time preceded by Rajiv Gandhi and succeeded in his position by Krishna Chandra Pant. At that time due to his non-corrupt image, he was also called 'Mr. Clean'. He was not able to do any good work for Defence due to holding the position for such a short time. But his biggest work was in the import of Bofors. Once ensconced in South Block, Singh began to investigate the notoriously murky world of defence procurement. After a while, word began to spread that Singh possessed information about the Bofors defence deal (the infamous arms-procurement fraud) that could damage Gandhi's reputation. Before he could act on it, he was dismissed from the Cabinet and, in response, resigned his memberships in the Congress Party (Indira) and the Lok Sabha. The deal of Bofors also played a very crucial role in making of his Prime Minister of India.

=== Minister of External Affairs (1989) ===
He was appointed as the 16th Minister of External Affairs of India and remained in the position for another very short period of just 3 days from 2 December 1989 to 5 December 1989. He was succeeded by Inder Kumar Gujral for the position.

== Formation of Janata Dal ==
Together with associates Arun Nehru and Arif Mohammad Khan, Singh floated an opposition party named Jan Morcha. He was re-elected to Lok Sabha in a tightly contested by-election from Allahabad, defeating Sunil Shastri. On 11 October 1988, the birthday of the original Janata coalition's leader Jayaprakash Narayan, Singh founded the Janata Dal by the merger of Jan Morcha, Janata Party, Lok Dal and Congress (S), in order to bring together all the centrist parties opposed to the Rajiv Gandhi government, and Singh was elected the President of the Janata Dal. An opposition coalition of the Janata Dal with regional parties including the Dravida Munnetra Kazhagam, Telugu Desam Party, and Asom Gana Parishad, came into being, called the National Front, with V. P. Singh as convener, NT Rama Rao as president, and P Upendra as a General Secretary.

The National Front fought 1989 General Elections after coming to an electoral understanding with Bharatiya Janata Party and the Left parties (the two main oppositions) that served to unify the anti-Congress vote. The National Front, with its allies, earned a simple majority in the Lok Sabha and decided to form a government. The Bharatiya Janta Party under the leadership of Atal Bihari Vajpayee and the Left parties such as the Communist Party of India (Marxist) and the Communist Party of India declined to serve in the government, preferring to support the government from outside.

In a meeting in the Central Hall of Parliament on 1 December, Singh proposed the name of Devi Lal as Prime Minister, in spite of the fact that he himself had been clearly projected by the anti-Congress forces as the 'clean' alternative to Rajiv Gandhi and their Prime Ministerial candidate. Chaudhary Devi Lal, a Jat leader from Haryana stood up and refused the nomination, and said that he would prefer to be an 'elder uncle' to the Government and that Singh should be Prime Minister. This last part came as a clear surprise to Chandra Shekhar, the former head of the erstwhile Janata Party, and Singh's greatest rival within the Janata Dal. Shekhar, who had clearly expected that an agreement had been forged with Lal as the consensus candidate, withdrew from the meeting and refused to serve in the Cabinet.

Singh was sworn in as India's Prime Minister on 2 December 1989.

== Prime Minister (1989–1990) ==
Singh held office for slightly less than a year, from 2 December 1989 to 10 November 1990. After state legislative elections in March 1990, Singh's governing coalition achieved control of both houses of India's parliament. During this time, Janata Dal came to power in five Indian states under Om Prakash Chautala (Banarsi Das Gupta, Hukam Singh), Chimanbhai Patel, Biju Patnaik, Lalu Prasad Yadav, and Mulayam Singh Yadav, and the National Front constituents in two more NT Rama Rao, and Prafulla Kumar Mahanta. The Janata Dal also shared power in West Bengal under Jyoti Basu, in Kerala under EK Nayanar and in Rajasthan under Bhairon Singh Shekhawat (supporting the Bharatiya Janata Party government from outside) and already incumbent M. Karunanidhi government in Tamil Nadu from January 1989. Singh decided to end the Indian army's unsuccessful operation in Sri Lanka which Rajiv Gandhi, his predecessor, had sent to combat the Tamil separatist movement. He was second chief minister of Uttar Pradesh to occupy the post after Charan Singh.

In Punjab, Singh replaced the hard-line Siddhartha Shankar Ray as Governor with another former bureaucrat, Nirmal Kumar Mukarji, who moved forward on a timetable for fresh elections. Singh himself made a much-publicised visit to the Golden Temple to ask forgiveness for Operation Blue Star and the combination of events caused the long rebellion in Punjab to die down markedly in a few months.

He also thwarted the efforts of Pakistan under Benazir Bhutto to start a border war with India.

=== Exodus of Kashmiri Hindus ===
V. P. Singh faced his first crisis within few days of taking office, when Kashmiri militants kidnapped the daughter of his Home Minister, Mufti Mohammad Sayeed (later Chief Minister of Jammu and Kashmir). His government agreed to the demand for releasing militants in exchange; partly to end the storm of criticism that followed, he shortly thereafter appointed Jagmohan Malhotra, a former bureaucrat, as Governor of Jammu and Kashmir. (Note: Representatives of the Jammu and Kashmir Liberation Front telephoned the local newspaper Kashmir Times at about 5:30 p.m., stating that their group's mujahideen had kidnapped Dr Rubaiya Sayeed, and that she would remain their hostage until the government released Sheikh Abdul Hameed, a JKLF "area commander" Ghulam Nabi Butt, younger brother of the convicted and hanged terrorist Maqbool Butt; Noor Muhammad Kalwal; Muhammed Altaf; and Mushtaq Ahmed Zargar.)

The Pandits of the Kashmir Valley, were forced to flee the Kashmir valley as a result of being targeted by JKLF and Islamist insurgents during late 1989 and early 1990. Of the approximately 300,000 to 600,000 Hindus living in the Kashmir Valley in 1990 only 2,000–3,000 remain there in 2016.

=== 62 Amendment of 1989 and SC-ST Act ===
In the year 1989, the government by Singh implemented the SC-ST Act of 1989 to prevent the atrocities against the members of Scheduled Castes and Scheduled Tribes. It was enacted when the provisions of the existing laws (such as the Protection of Civil Rights Act 1955 and Indian Penal Code) were found to be inadequate to check these crimes (defined as 'atrocities' in the Act). Recognising the continuing gross indignities and offences against Scheduled Castes and Tribes, the Parliament passed the 'Scheduled Castes and Schedule Tribes (Prevention of Atrocities) Act 1989. The objectives of the Act clearly emphasised the intention of the government to deliver justice to these communities through proactive efforts to enable them to live in society with dignity and self-esteem and without fear or violence or suppression from the dominant castes. The practice of untouchability, in its overt and covert form was made a cognizable and non-compoundable offence, and strict punishment is provided for any such offence. The act was finally passed somehow with controversies.

=== Mandal Commission report ===
Singh himself wished to move forward nationally on social justice-related issues, which would, in addition, consolidate the caste coalition that supported the Janata Dal in northern India, and accordingly decided to implement the recommendations of the Mandal Commission which suggested that a fixed quota of all jobs in the public sector be reserved for members of the historically disadvantaged called Other Backward Classes. (Note: Leading to the formation of the Mandal Commission, Indian society was based largely on the principles of Caste and to that extent a partially closed system. The lack of social mobility created a social stratification that played a dominant role within Indian society, laying the context for the Mandal Commission to be formed. Therefore, during the late 1900s, India witnessed caste and class to stand for different patterns of distribution of properties/occupations for individuals. This directly affected Scheduled Castes and Scheduled Tribes that were known collectively as Other Backward Classes (OBC), which were the focus groups that experienced the severities of caste/class stratification within the social organization (caste) found within traditional India.)

This decision led to widespread protests among the upper caste youth in urban areas in northern India. OBC reservation (less creamy layer) was upheld by the Supreme Court in 2008. Culturally unique features of the protests and riots were self-immolations, bandhs (a version of a strike), hartals (a version of a municipal shut-down), dharnas (a version of swarming). Articles also highlighted politicians and victims of rioting during the protests. Although not advisable, late summer travel by airline and vehicle during the protests was possible without delays, between capitals New Delhi and Chandigarh, and Shimla for example. Police prevented extending the range and duration of the strikes, and some strike activity from even occurring. A national state of emergency was largely not declared to mobilize army units against any one demonstration. The strike helped to give large popularity to the Mandal Commission report and fueled the political grouping of the OBC castes, which later helped a lot for the strengthening of regional political parties and stronger parties and other than Congress and BJP. Due to the loss of the votes of the backward caste neither party opposed it and on seeing the protest nor parties declined it.

Even after the passing of the reservations for the Other Backward Class, he was never accepted by them, and his upper-caste voters also didn't have to trust him. Afterward, OBC leaders flexed their political power and outnumbered upper and lower castes to gain political power in Uttar Pradesh, Bihar, Madhya Pradesh, and Rajasthan. The OBC leaders rejected sharing power with lower caste leaders.

=== Tug of war with the Reliance group ===
In 1990, the government-owned financial institutions like the Life Insurance Corporation of India and the General Insurance Corporation of India stonewalled attempts by the Reliance group to acquire managerial control over Larsen & Toubro. Sensing defeat, the Ambanis resigned from the board of the company. Dhirubhai, who had become Larsen & Toubro's chairman in April 1989, had to quit his position to make way for D. N. Ghosh, former chairman of the State Bank of India.

Map of Ram Rath Yatra by L. K. Advani.

=== Ram temple issue and the fall of the coalition ===
Meanwhile, the Bharatiya Janata Party was moving its own agenda forward. In particular, the Ram Janmabhoomi agitation, which served as a rallying cry for several Hindu organisations, took on a new life. The party president, LK Advani, with Pramod Mahajan as aide, toured the northern states on a rath – a bus converted to look like a mythical chariot – with the intention of drumming up support. Before he could complete the tour by reaching the disputed site in Ayodhya, he was arrested by Lalu Prasad Yadav's orders at Samastipur on the charges of disturbing the peace and fomenting communal tension. Lalu wanted to prevent the communal clashes which took place at different places for this Rath Yatra, and also Bihar faced a similar scenario in 1989 due to the Shilanyas by Rajiv Gandhi Government. Karsevaks reached the site on 30 October 1990, and by the orders of Mulayam Singh Yadav police fired openly upon the Kar sevaks. A deadly riot took place in Ayodhya on 2 November.

This led to the Bharatiya Janata Party's suspension of support to the National Front government. VP Singh faced the vote of no confidence in the Lok Sabha saying that he occupied the high moral ground, as he stood for secularism, had saved the Babri Masjid at the cost of power and had upheld the fundamental principles which were challenged during the crises. "What kind of India do you want?" he asked of his opponents in Parliament, before losing the vote 142–346; only a portion of the National Front remaining loyal to him and the Left parties supported him in the vote.

And then, Singh resigned on 7 November 1990. (Note: On 7 November 1990, V.P. Singh resigned after suffering a vote of no confidence by a stunning margin of 356 to 151.)

=== Chandra Shekhar government ===
External videos
- The race for PM in Janata Dal and SSP. Retrieved from YouTube on 26 May 2018.

Chandra Shekhar immediately seized the moment and left the Janata Dal with several of his own supporters (including Devi Lal, Janeshwar Mishra, HD Deve Gowda, Maneka Gandhi, Ashoke Kumar Sen, Subodh Kant Sahay, Om Prakash Chautala, Hukam Singh, Chimanbhai Patel, Mulayam Singh Yadav, Yashwant Sinha, VC Shukla, and Sanjay Singh) to form the Samajwadi Janata Party/Janata Dal (Socialist). Although Chandra Shekhar had a mere 64 MPs, Rajiv Gandhi the leader of the Opposition, agreed to support him on the floor of the House; so he won a confidence motion and was sworn in as Prime Minister. Eight Janata Dal MPs who voted for this motion were disqualified by the speaker Rabi Ray. His government lasted only a few months before he resigned and called for fresh elections.

== Post-premiership and death ==
VP Singh contested the new elections but his party was relegated to the opposition chiefly due to the assassination of Rajiv Gandhi (May 1991) during the election campaign, and he later retired from active politics. He spent the next few years touring the country speaking about matters related to issues of social justice and his artistic pursuits, chiefly painting.

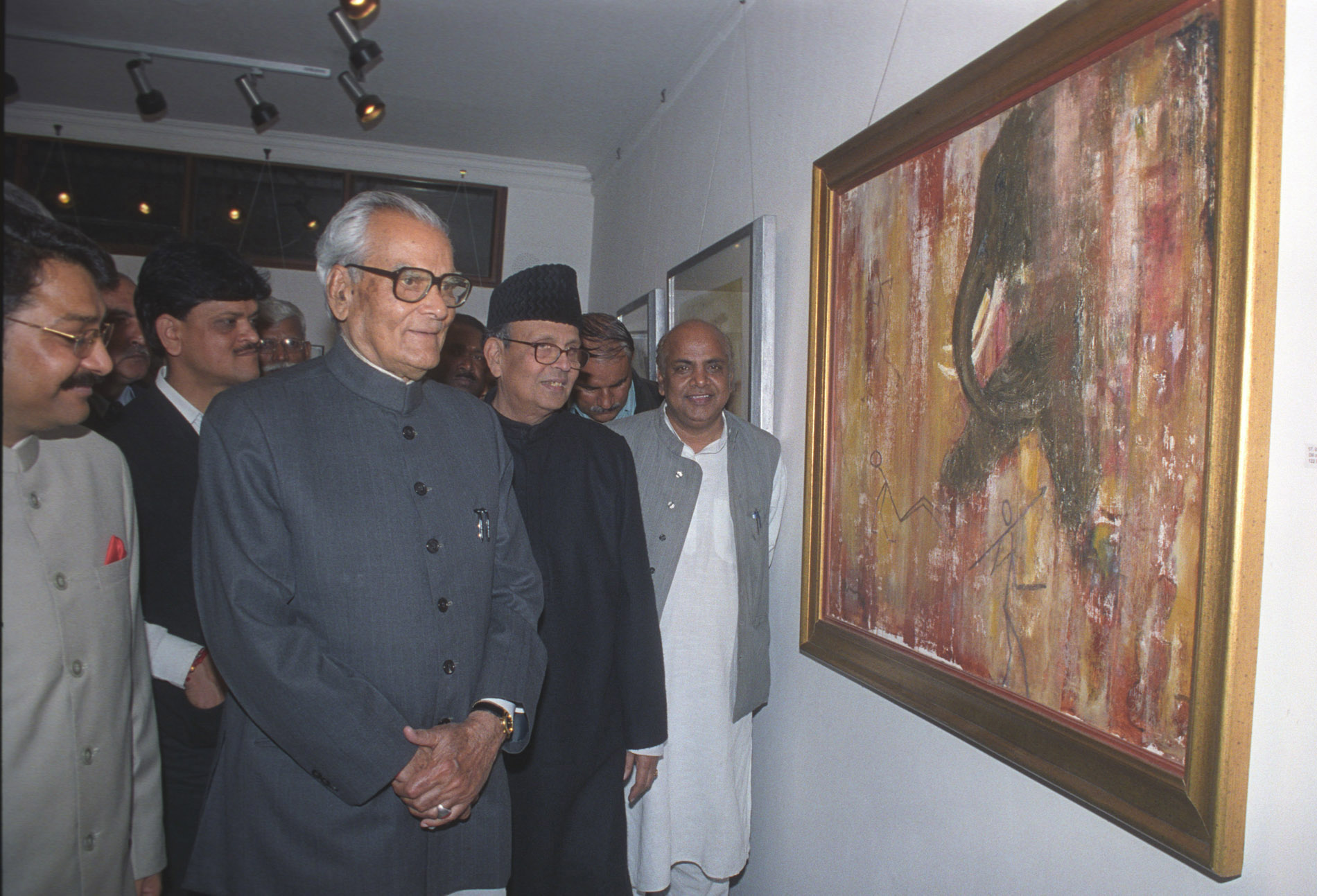
The Vice President of India, Shri Bhairon Singh Shekhawat looking at painting works by the former Prime Minister Shri V. P. Singh, after inaugurating the exhibition, in New Delhi on 14 February 2006

In 1992, Singh was the first to propose the name of the future President KR Narayanan as an (eventually successful) candidate for vice president. Later the same year in December, he led his followers to Ayodhya to oppose the Karseva proposed by LK Advani, and was arrested before he could reach the site; the Masjid was demolished by the Karsevaks a few days later. In 1996, the Congress party lost the general elections and Singh was the natural choice of the winning United Front (Singh was one of the forces behind the broad United Front coalition) for the post of Prime Minister. But he declined the offer made to him by communist veteran Jyoti Basu, Bihar strongman Lalu Prasad Yadav and almost all leaders of the Janata family.

In an interview with Shekhar Gupta in July 2005, Singh said that he had resigned from the Rajiv Gandhi cabinet due to differences that arose in the dealing of information regarding commissions taken by Indian agents in the HDW submarine deal, and not due to Bofors. In April 1987, Singh received a secret telegram from J.C.Ajmani, the Indian ambassador in West Germany. The telegram stated that Indian agents had received large commissions in the HDW deal. These commissions amounted to a staggering Rs. 32.55 crore (7% of the agreed price). Singh informed Rajiv Gandhi about this and instituted an inquiry. However, the handling of this case led to differences and Singh finally resigned from the cabinet.

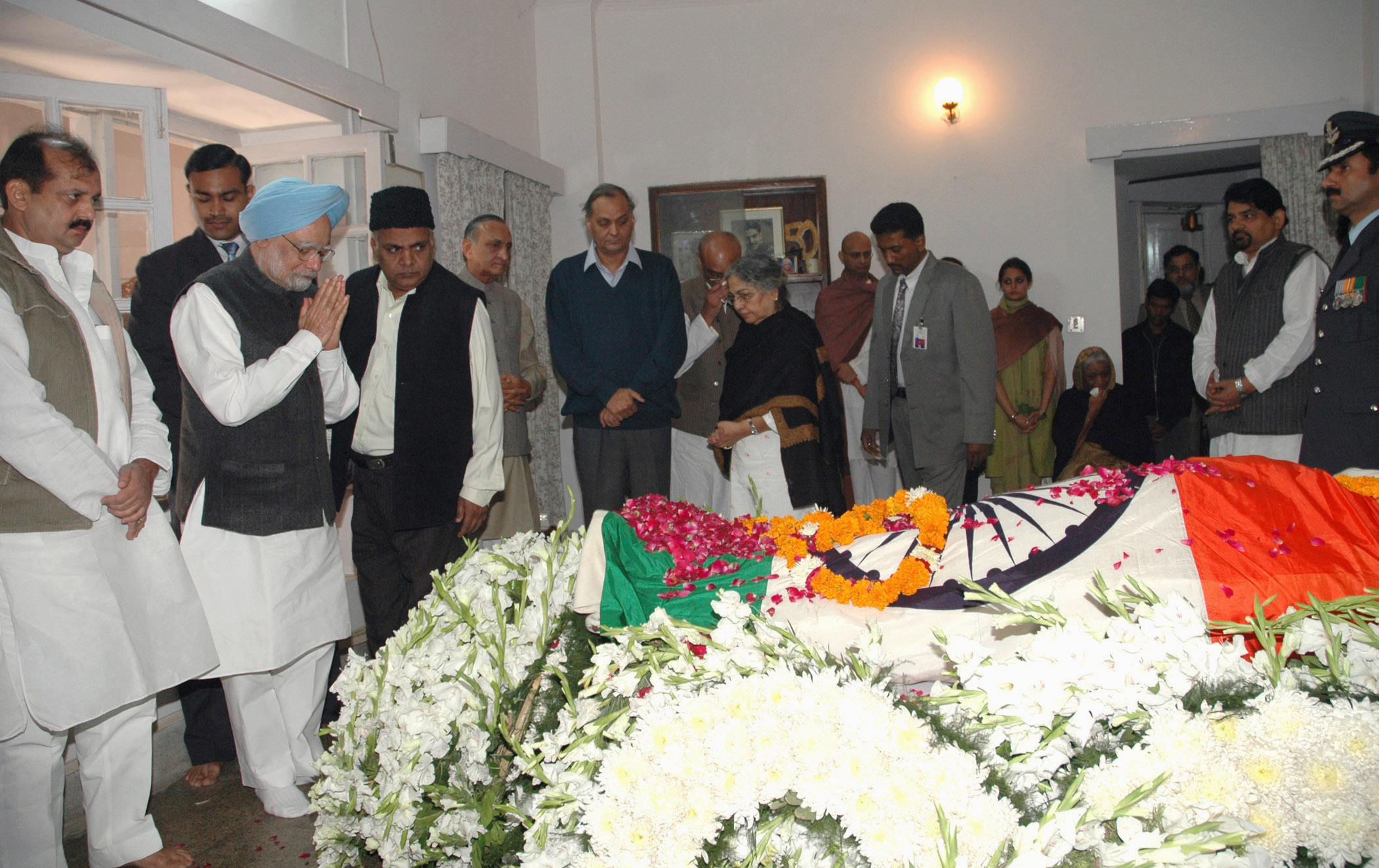
The Prime Minister, Dr. Manmohan Singh, paying homage at the mortal remains of the former Prime Minister, Shri V. P. Singh, in New Delhi on 28 November 2008

Singh was diagnosed with cancer in 1998 and ceased public appearances. When his cancer went into remission in 2003, he once again became a visible figure, especially in the many groupings that had inherited the space once occupied by his Janata Dal. He relaunched the Jan Morcha in 2006 with actor-turned-politician Raj Babbar as president. After Jan Morcha drew a blank in the 2007 UP elections, Raj Babbar joined the Congress, and Singh's elder son Ajeya Singh took over the reins of the party in anticipation of the 2009 General elections. Ajeya Singh then contested as Jan Morcha candidate from Fatehpur, but lost to Rakesh Sachan of the Samajwadi Party. The Jan Morcha was renamed as the National Jan Morcha in June 2009. A month later, the Jan Morcha merged with the Indian National Congress. In 2006, Singh was placed under arrest in Ghaziabad as he and his supporters were proceeding towards a hauling where prohibitory orders under Section 144 had been imposed to join the farmers agitating against the acquisition of land at Dadri by the Anil Ambani-owned Reliance Industries and demanding adequate compensation. Later, Singh and CPI General Secretary AB Bardhan were again arrested on the UP border when they were proceeding to Dadri. However, Singh and Babbar were later able to evade the police, reaching Dadri on 18 August 2006, and ploughing the land in solidarity with the farmers.

Singh died after a very long struggle with multiple myeloma and kidney failure at Apollo Hospital in Delhi on 27 November 2008, aged 77. He was cremated at Allahabad on the banks of the River Ganges on 29 November 2008, his son Ajeya Singh lighting the funeral pyre. He was cremated with full state honour. (Note: After battling with cancer and renal failure for a decade, former Prime Minister Vishwanath Pratap Singh died on Thursday at New Delhi’s Indraprastha Apollo Hospitals, reports HT Correspondent.)

== Office held ==
=== Political Offices ===
| S. No. | Office | Seat | Tenure | Preceded | Succeeded | Ref. |
|---|---|---|---|---|---|---|
| 1. | Member of Legislative Assembly | Soraon | 1969–1971 | – | – | |
| 2. | Member of Parliament, Lok Sabha | Phulpur | 1971–1977 | Janeshwar Mishra | Kamala Bahuguna | |
| 3. | Member of Parliament, Lok Sabha | Fatehpur | 1980-1980 | Janeshwar Mishra | Krishna Prakash Tiwari | |
| 4. | Member of Legislative Assembly | Tindwari | 1980–1983 | – | – | |
| 5. | Member of Parliament, Rajya Sabha | Uttar Pradesh | 1983–1988 | – | – | |
| 6. | Member of Parliament, Lok Sabha | Allahabad | 1988–1989 | Amitabh Bachchan | Janeshwar Mishra | |
| 7. | Member of Parliament, Lok Sabha | Fatehpur | 1989–1996 | Hari Krishna Shastri | Vishambhar Prasad Nishad | |

=== Political Positions ===
| S. No. | Position | Tenure | Preceded | Succeeded |
|---|---|---|---|---|
| 1. | Ministry of Commerce and Industry | 1976–1977 | | |
| 2. | 12th Chief Minister of Uttar Pradesh | 9 June 1980 – 19 July 1982 | Banarsi Das | Sripati Mishra |
| 3. | Finance Minister of India | 31 December 1984 – 23 January 1987 | Rajiv Gandhi | Pranab Mukherjee |
| 4. | Leader of Rajya Sabha | December 1984 – April 1987 | Pranab Mukherjee | N. D. Tiwari |
| 5. | Defence Minister of India | 24 January 1987 – 12 April 1987 | Rajiv Gandhi | Krishna Chandra Pant |
| 6. | External Affairs minister of India | 2 December 1989 – 5 December 1989 | P. V. Narsimaha Rao | Inder Kumar Gujral |
| 7. | 7th Prime Minister of India | 2 December 1989 – 10 November 1990 | Rajiv Gandhi | Chandra Shekhar |
| 8. | Defence Minister of India | 2 December 1989 – 10 November 1990 | Krishna Chandra Pant | Chandra Shekhar |

== Personal life ==
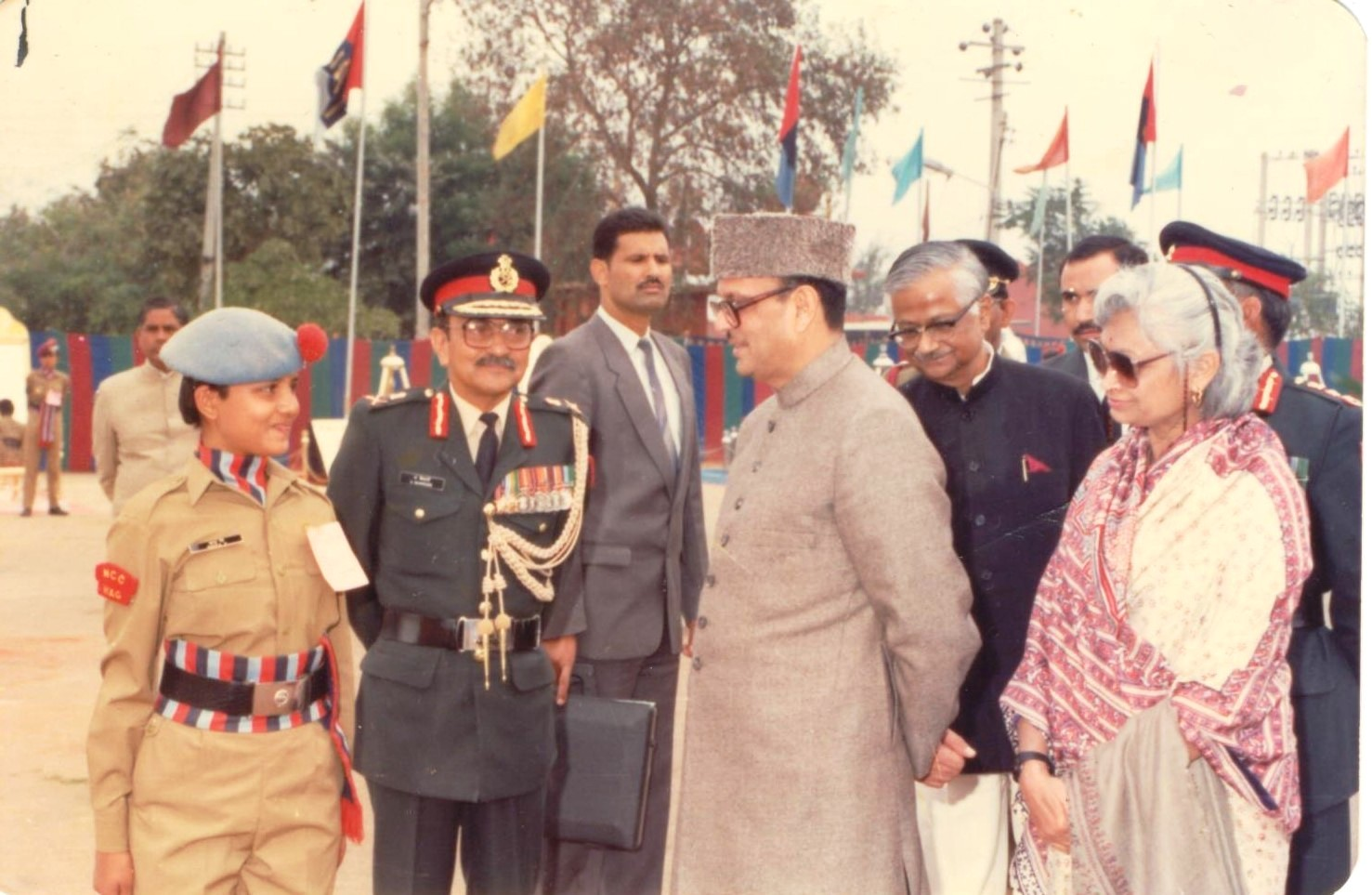
V. P. Singh and his wife Sita Kumari with NCC cadet D. Roopa.

Singh married Princess Sita Kumari, the daughter of the Raja of Deogarh-Madaria, Rajasthan, on his 24th birthday. It was an arranged marriage and she was 18. Kumari was a Sisodia Rajput descended from Maharana Pratap of Udaipur. The couple had two sons, Ajeya Pratap Singh (born 1957), a chartered accountant in New York City, and Abhay Pratap Singh (born 1958), a doctor at the All India Institute of Medical Sciences in New Delhi.

After his death, his elder son Ajeya Singh was sworn as the Raja Bahadur of the Manda estate in 2007 and in 2009, he merged his party Jan Morcha with Indian National Congress.

== Cultural legacy ==
=== Painting ===
V.P. Singh was also a talented artist. His engagement with the arts began long before his political career and continued when he returned to painting while recuperating from illness. Singh's work—primarily sketches, watercolors, and oil paintings—has been exhibited in New Delhi, Mumbai, London, and other cities. In his later years, the themes in his art became more restless and frenzied.

Singh's artistic career paused during his time in politics but resumed after he left public office. On 29 December 2003, 110 of his paintings were exhibited at Aparna Arts Gallery in Delhi.

His son, Ajeya Singh, showcased his father's paintings on 6 May 2015, at Aryan Art Gallery in Delhi. Singh began his artistic journey as an accomplished photographer before progressing to pencil sketches. He later studied under Prof. Sukhvir Sanghal in Allahabad, where he learned wash painting and figurative drawing in the Bengal School style. His works are both impressionist and expressionist in nature, with some surrealist and non-figurative pieces.

=== Statue ===
A statue of V.P. Singh is situated at Presidency College, Chennai. It was inaugurated by Tamil Nadu Chief Minister M. K. Stalin in the presence of V.P. Singh's wife and Akhilesh Yadav on 27 November 2023.

=== Films ===
1. Juliet Reynolds, an art critic and a close friend of Singh, made a short documentary on him, titled The Art of the Impossible (45 minutes long), and covers his political and artistic career.
2. Suma Josson made another film on Singh titled One More Day to Live.
3. Shekhar Gupta had interviewed Singh in 2007, with the episode titled Walk The Talk with V. P. Singh.

=== Books connected ===
1. Shourie, Arun (1991). The State as Charade: V.P. Singh, Chandra Shekhar & the Rest. University of California: Roli Books. ISBN 9788190019910. Archived from the original on 26 December 2007.
2. Gujral, Inder Kumar (2011). Matters of Discretion: An Autobiography. Penguin Books Publication. ISBN 978-93-8048-080-0. Archived from the original on 28 July 2023.
3. Upender, P. (1994). Gatham Swagatham.
4. Ramaswami, Venkatraman (1994). My Presidential Years. University of Michigan: HarperCollins Publishers India. ISBN 81-7223-202-0.

== See also ==
- List of Rajputs
- Ram Rath Yatra
- List of prime ministers of India
- Ministry of Defence (India)
- Ministry of External Affairs (India)
- Minister of Finance (India)
- Seema Mustafa
- Chandra Shekhar
- Janata Dal
- Devi Lal
- V. P. Singh ministry
- Manda (zamindari)
- Jan Morcha
- 1989 kidnapping of Rubaiya Sayeed

Political offices
| Preceded by Banarsi Das | Chief Minister of Uttar Pradesh; 1980–1982 | Succeeded by Sripati Mishra |
| Preceded by Pranab Mukherjee | Minister of Finance; 1985–1987 | Succeeded by Rajiv Gandhi |
| Preceded by Rajiv Gandhi | Minister of Defence; 1987 | Succeeded by Krishna Chandra Pant |
| Preceded by Rajiv Gandhi | Prime Minister of India; 1989–1990 | Succeeded by Chandra Shekhar |
| Preceded by Rajiv Gandhi | Chairperson of the Planning Commission; 1989–1990 | Succeeded by Chandra Shekhar |
| Preceded by Krishna Chandra Pant | Minister of Defence; 1989–1990 | Succeeded by Chandra Shekhar |
