= Jan Morcha =

- Founder: V. P. Singh
- Founded: 1987
- Split from: Indian National Congress
- Merged into: Janata Dal
- Political position: Centre-left

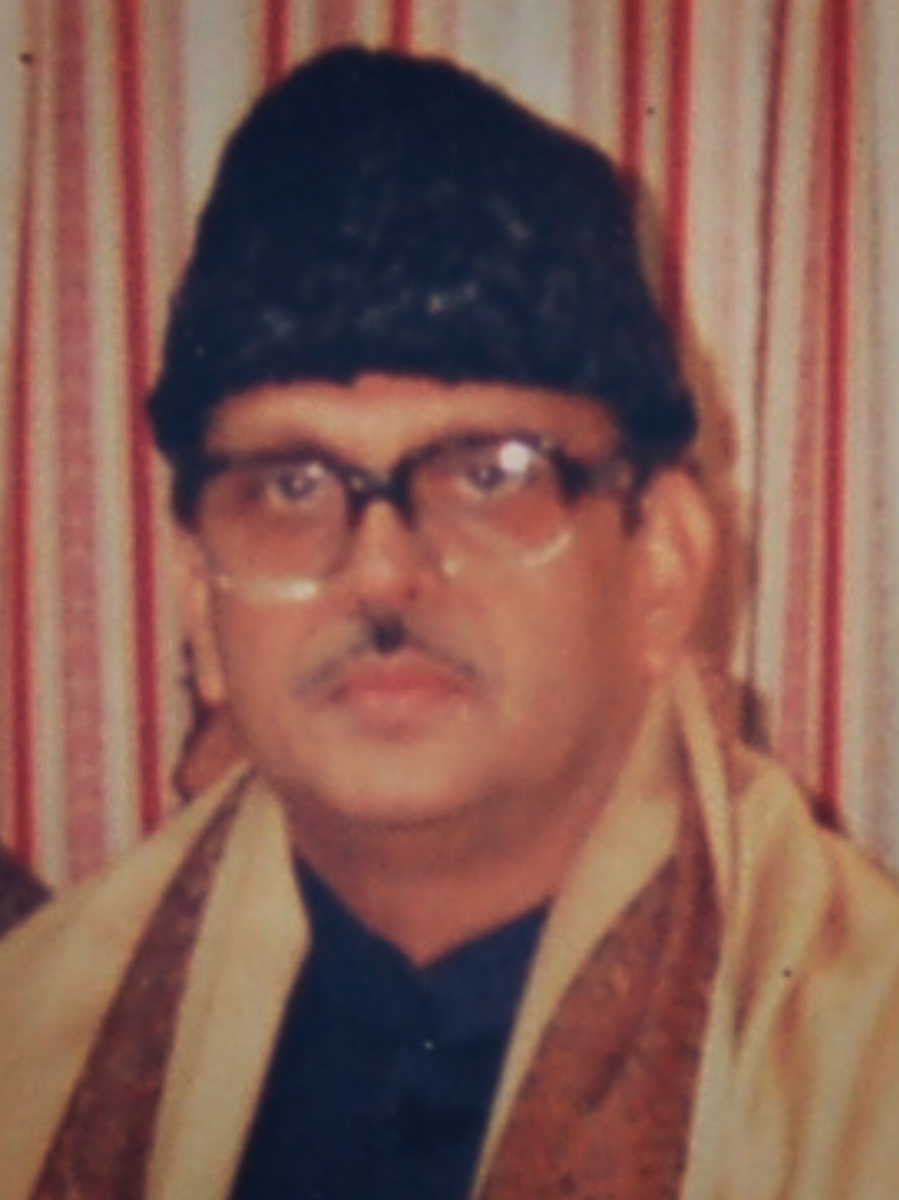
V. P. Singh, founder of the Jan Morcha and Prime Minister of India in 1989–90

The Jan Morcha ('People's Front') was an Indian political party founded by V. P. Singh after he left the Indian National Congress party in 1987 upon being dismissed as Defence Minister by Prime Minister Rajiv Gandhi. Together with Arun Nehru, Arif Mohammed Khan, Mufti Mohammad Sayeed, Vidya Charan Shukla, Ram Dhan, Raj Kumar Rai and Satyapal Malik, Singh formed a nucleus of opposition to the Rajiv Gandhi government that had a commanding majority in the Lok Sabha.

Following the increasing visibility of his stand against corruption in public life and his growing popularity, the social-democratic parties like the Janata Party, Lok Dal and Congress (S) – many of them survivors of the original Janata Party of 1977 – came together and merged with the Jan Morcha to form the Janata Dal to contest the 1989 general elections. In those elections, the National Front, together with the Leftist and Rightist parties opposed to the Congress gained a plurality of seats. Subsequently V. P. Singh served as prime minister of India for eleven months.

Following the Janata Dal's time in power and its subsequent split and decline, V. P. Singh, after surviving a battle with cancer, re-formed the Jan Morcha in 2005 with socialist actor-politician Raj Babbar as its public face. In the 2007 Uttar Pradesh state assembly elections, the party fielded 118 candidates, but other than Dharmpal Singh, who won from Dayalbagh, defeating Kishan Lal Baghel of the Bahujan Samaj Party by three thousand votes (1.7%), no other candidate was successful. After this poor showing, Babbar joined the Congress, and Singh's elder son Ajeya Pratap Singh took over the reins of the party in anticipation of the 2009 general elections.

In March 2009 Ajeya Singh announced that Jan Morcha was to be merged with the Lok Janshakti Party (LJP), of which he became a vice president and its Lok Sabha candidate from Fatehpur constituency. However, later, Ram Vilas Paswan joined hands with the Samajwadi Party (SP) of Mulayam Singh Yadav and the RJD of Laloo Prasad Yadav, to form a Fourth front, and Mulayam Singh declared that the LJP would not contest any seats in UP. Ajeya Singh then contested as Jan Morcha candidate from Fatehpur, but lost to Rakesh Sachan of the SP. The Jan Morcha was renamed as the National Jan Morcha in June 2009 and dedicated to farmer's causes and to forging a third alternative in national politics. A month later, the Jan Morcha merged with the Indian National Congress.
