= Ajeya Pratap Singh =

Indian politician

- Pretender
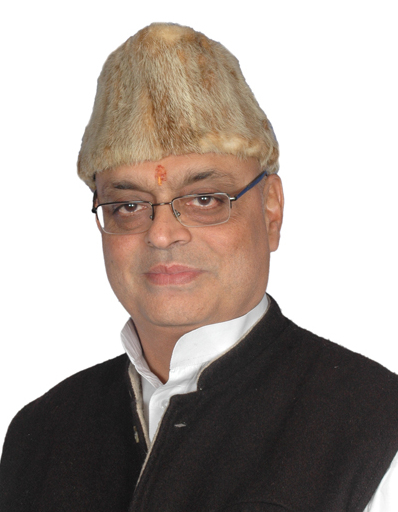
- Portrait of Ajeya Pratap Singh
- Born: 1956 (age 69–70)
- Title(s): 42nd Raja Bahadur of Manda
- Throne(s) claimed: Manda
- Pretend from: 2008–
- Monarchy abolished: Sovereign Monarchy; 1947 (Instrument of Accession); Titular Monarchy; 1971 (26th Amendment of the Indian Constitution)
- Last monarch: V.P. Singh
- Royal House: Gaharwal
- Father: V.P. Singh
- Mother: Sita Kumari
- Spouse: Shruti Kumari
- Children: 2
- Religion: Hinduism

Ajeya Pratap Singh (born 1956), formerly known as Ajeya Singh, is an Indian politician, a member of the Indian National Congress, and the pretender to the throne of Manda.

== Political career ==
He was a president of the Jan Morcha party which was later on merged with Indian National Congress in June 2009 but left active politics in 2012.

== Personal life ==
He is the eldest son of the seventh Prime Minister of India V. P. Singh. He is married to Shruti Kumari with whom he has two daughters.

== Sources ==
- Manda estate
- Jan Morcha merger with Congress party
- Ajeya Singh- Journey from Investment Banker & Businessman to Politics
