= Government M.A.O. College Lahore =

College in Lahore, Pakistan

Government Muhammadan Anglo Oriental College Lahore
- گورنمنٹ ایم۔اے۔او کالج لاہور
- Other name: Govt. M.A.O. College Lahore
- Former name: Santana Dharma College
- Motto: (Arabic) بَسۡطَةً۬ فِى ٱلۡعِلۡمِ وَٱلۡجِسۡمِ
- Motto in English: Allah has increased him abundantly in knowledge and stature
- Type: Public university
- Established: 1933
- Accreditation: Board of Intermediate and Secondary Education, Lahore
- Academic affiliations: Punjab University; Government College University, Lahore; Higher Education Commission of Pakistan
- Principal: Dr. Aaliya Rehman
- Faculty: 170±
- Students: 10,000±
- Undergraduates: 2000±
- Postgraduates: 600±
- Location: Lahore, Pakistan
- Campus: Urban
- Colors: Green, maroon, gold, blue
- Nickname: Anglorians
- Website: official website

Government Muhammadan Anglo Oriental College (abbreviated to Govt. M.A.O. College Lahore; Urdu: گورنمنٹ ایم۔اے۔او کالج لاہور;) is a public college located adjacent to Civil Secretariat Lahore. It is among the oldest educational institutions in Lahore, Punjab, Pakistan.

The college was initially established in 1879 as a Madrassah tul Muslemeen Amritsar in Masjid Khair ud Din by Anjum-e-Islamia Amritsar as center of islamic learning and was later renamed as Muhammad Anglo Oriental (M.A.O) School, Amritsar in 1883 and was made open to general education including English and other subjects such as politics, economics & Science. The school was given the status of college on June 5, 1933 as MAO College by Anjuman-e-Islamia at Amritsar and Professor S. Mercado was appointed the first principal. It had played a significant role in the creation of Pakistan. After the independence of Pakistan in 1947, the college was shifted to Lahore, in the building of a Hindu established college, Sanatan Dharma College, which was in turn shifted to Ambala, Haryana after partition.

== History ==
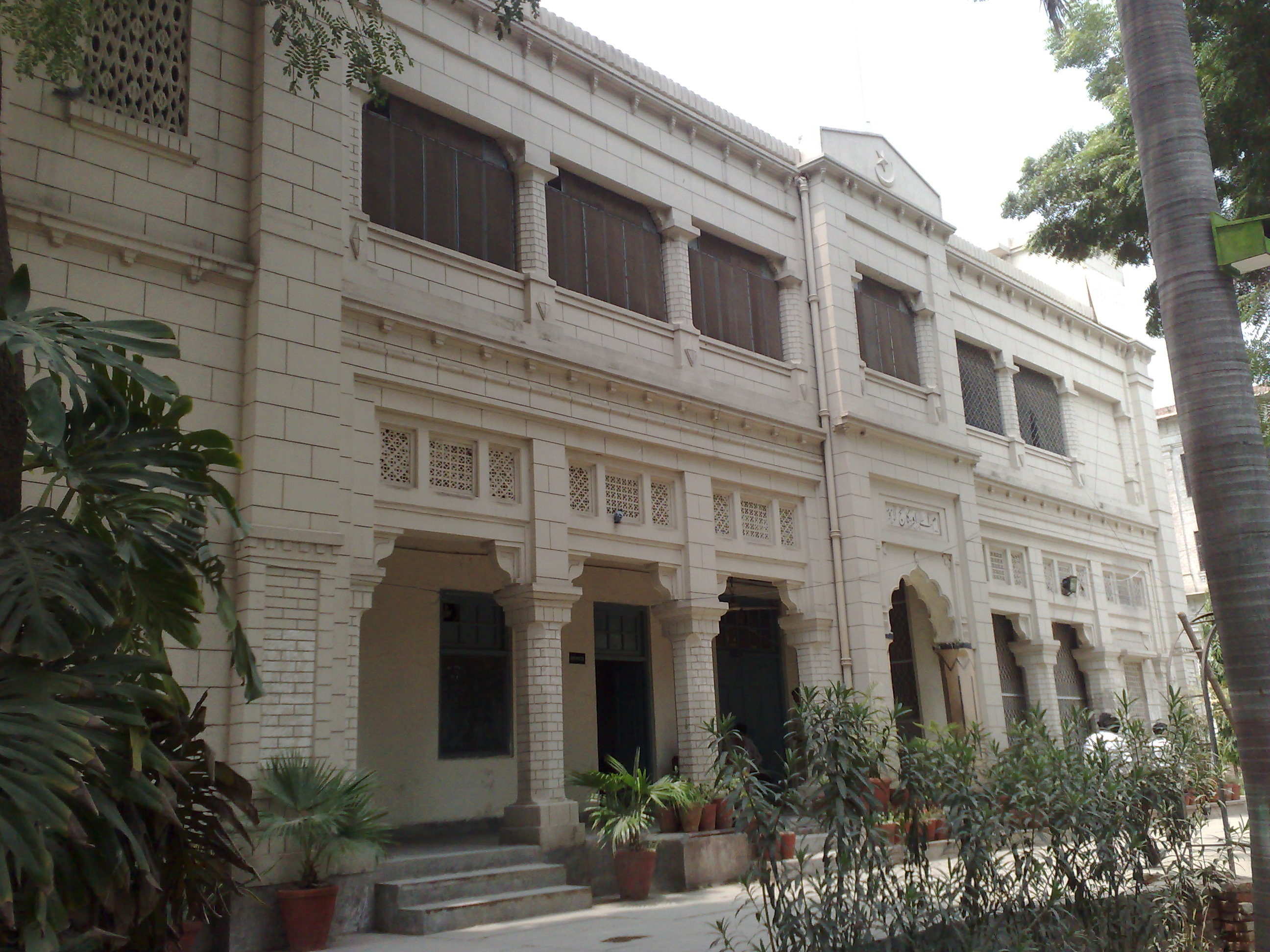
Administration Block

In 1933, MAO College was established by the Anjuman-e-Islamia in Amritsar on the pattern of the MAO College Aligarh to overcome the deficiencies of modern education in local Muslims. Professor S. Mercado was appointed the first principal. At the time of Partition, most of the college staff and students migrated to Lahore, where a new MAO College was established with the same pattern and mostly same staff, in the former Sanatan Dharma College premises, which in turn moved to Ambala.

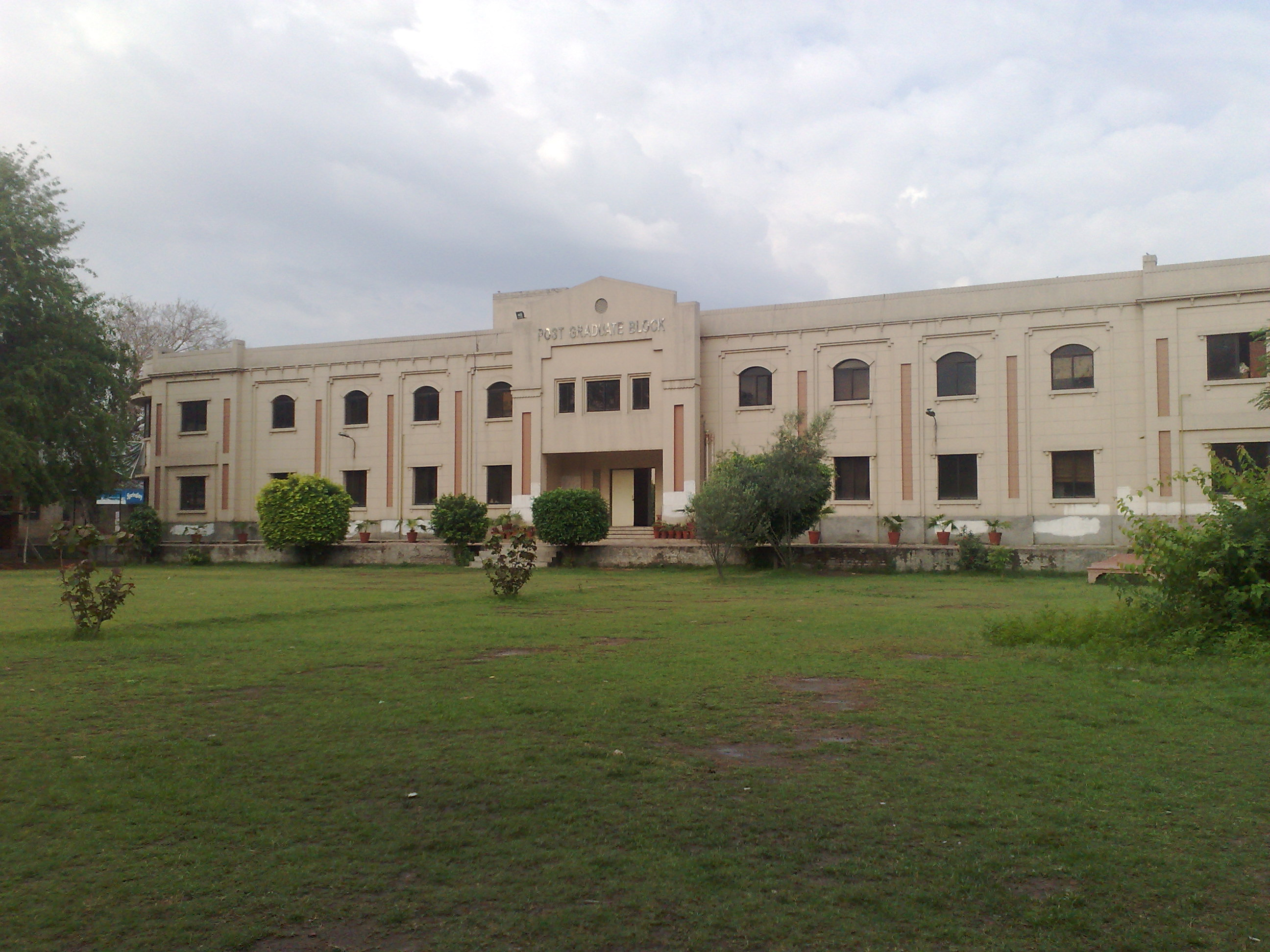
Outside view of Postgraduate Block

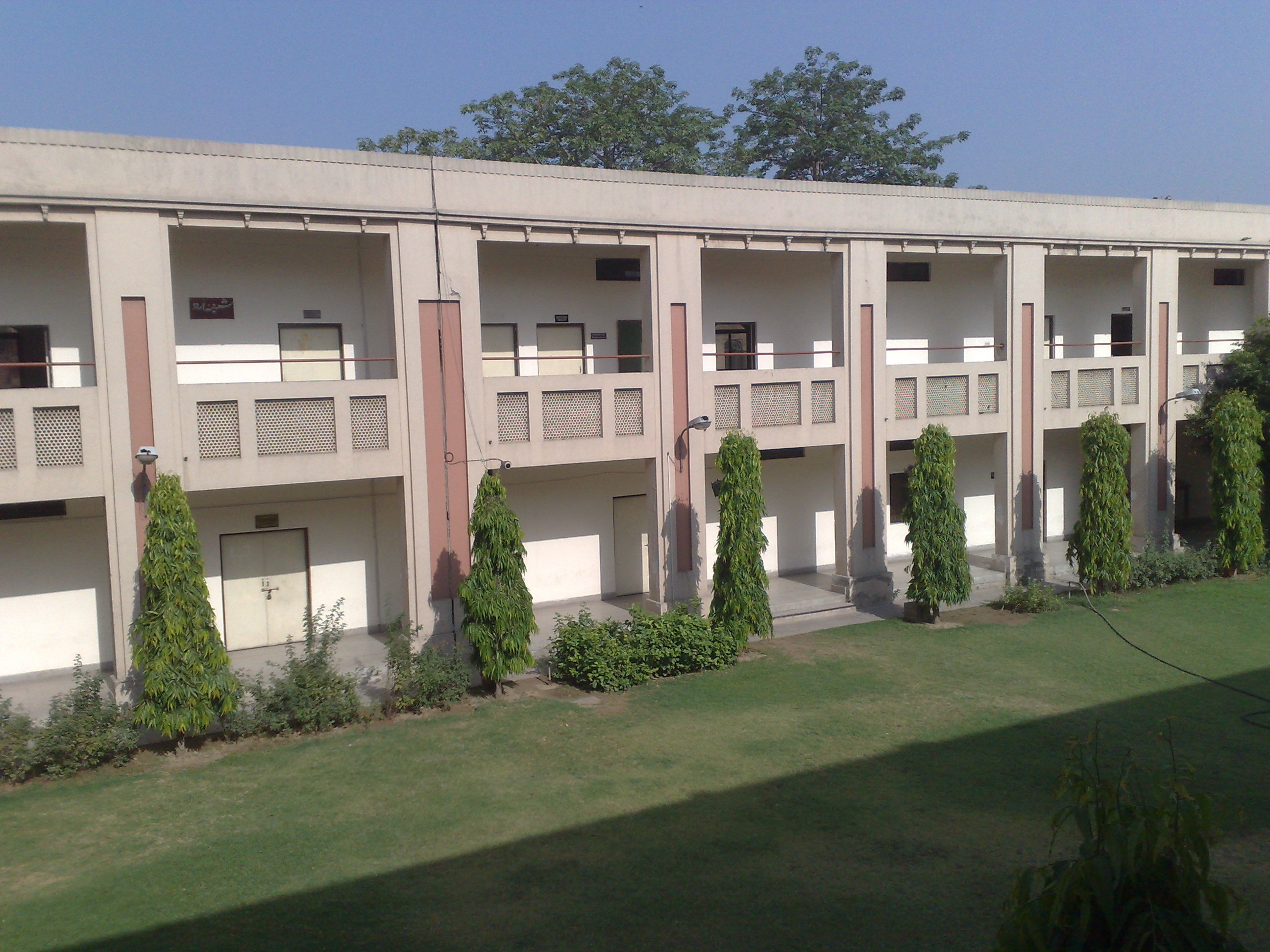
Postgraduate Block inside view

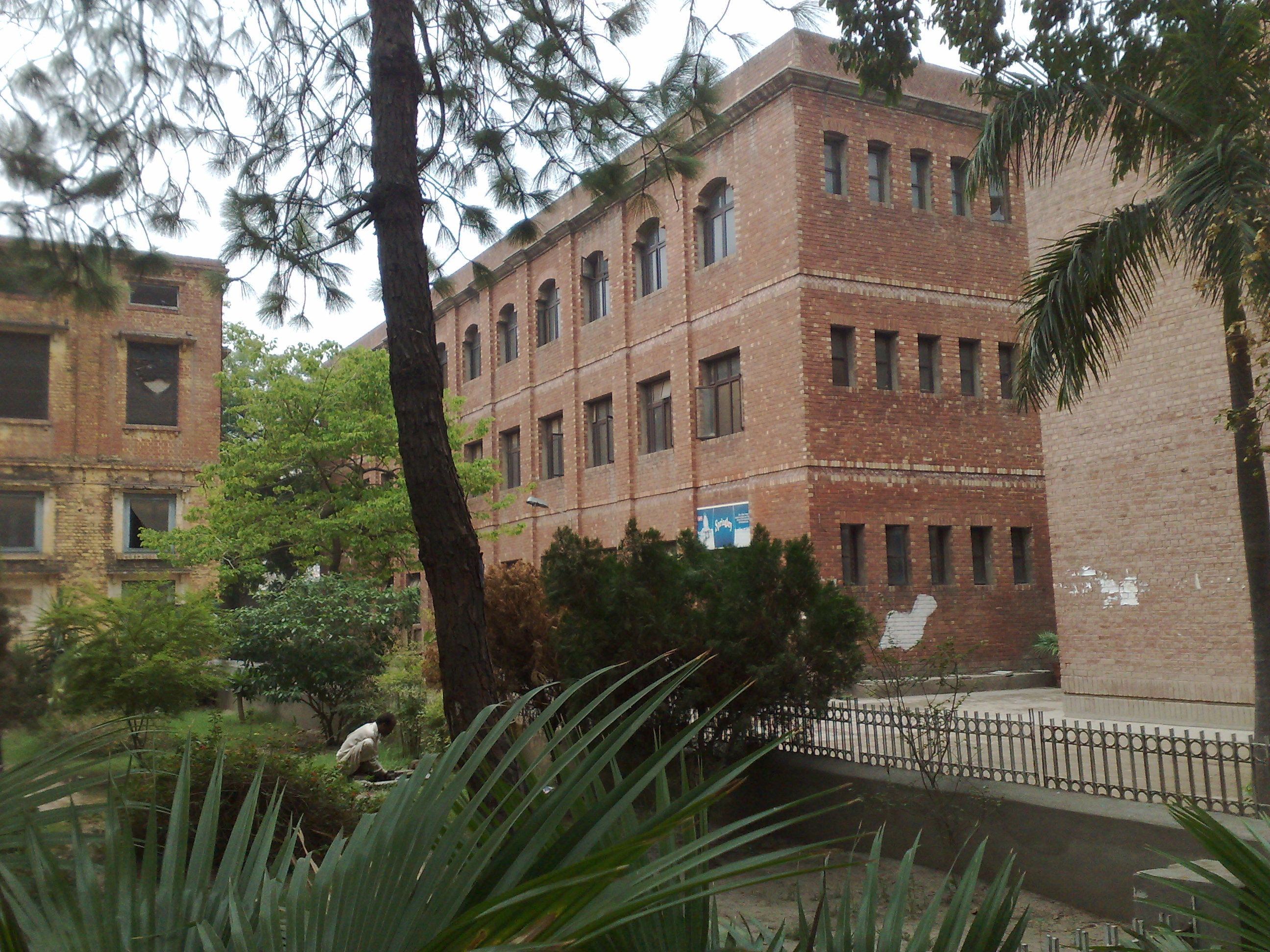
Commerce Block

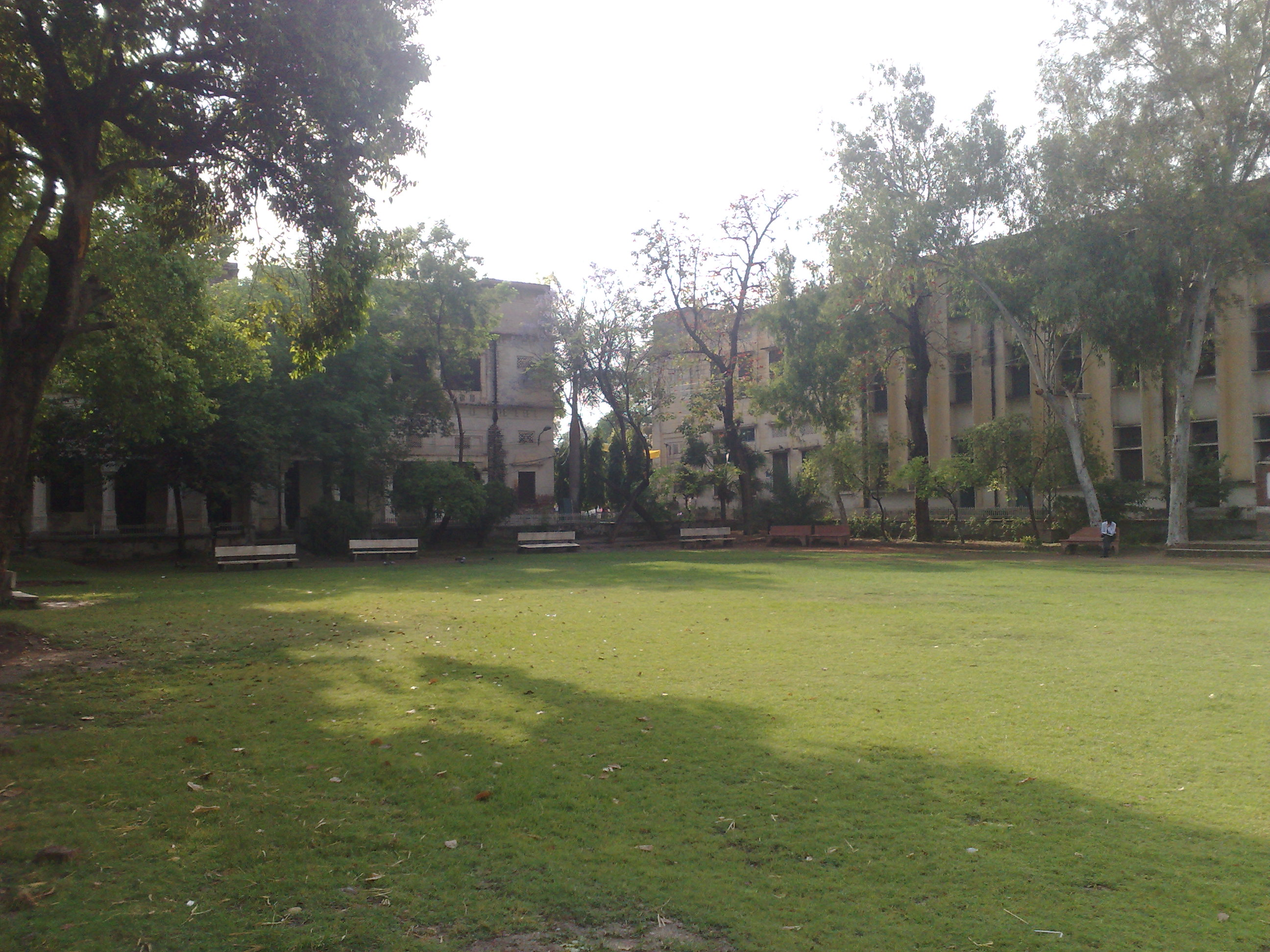
Karamat Block

== Academics ==
MAO College is organized into two divisions, the science and arts division. These divisions are further categorized as academic departments. The core departments include Commerce, Information Technology (I.T.), Chemistry, English, Physics, Mathematics, Mass Communication, Philosophy, Psychology, Statistics, and Social Work.

The college offers the Bachelor of Commerce (B.Com.), Bachelor of Business Administration (BBA), Bachelor of Science (B.S.) Physics, Psychology, English, Mathematics, I.T., Mass Communication, and BS Chemistry degrees at the undergraduate level, and the Master of Arts (M.A.) in English Literature, Urdu, Economics, Mass Communication, Master of Science (M.Sc.) in Mathematics, and M.Sc. Applied Psychology degrees at the graduate level.

There are separate blocks for each level of education. For example, Kramat Block is associated with the Intermediate level, Commerce Block hosts undergraduate students and Postgraduate Block is devoted to Masters Classes. Dilwar Block and Physics Block are currently in the renovation process and are not operational yet. The college has a state of the art, multimedia enriched Auditorium, which is often used to organize different events.

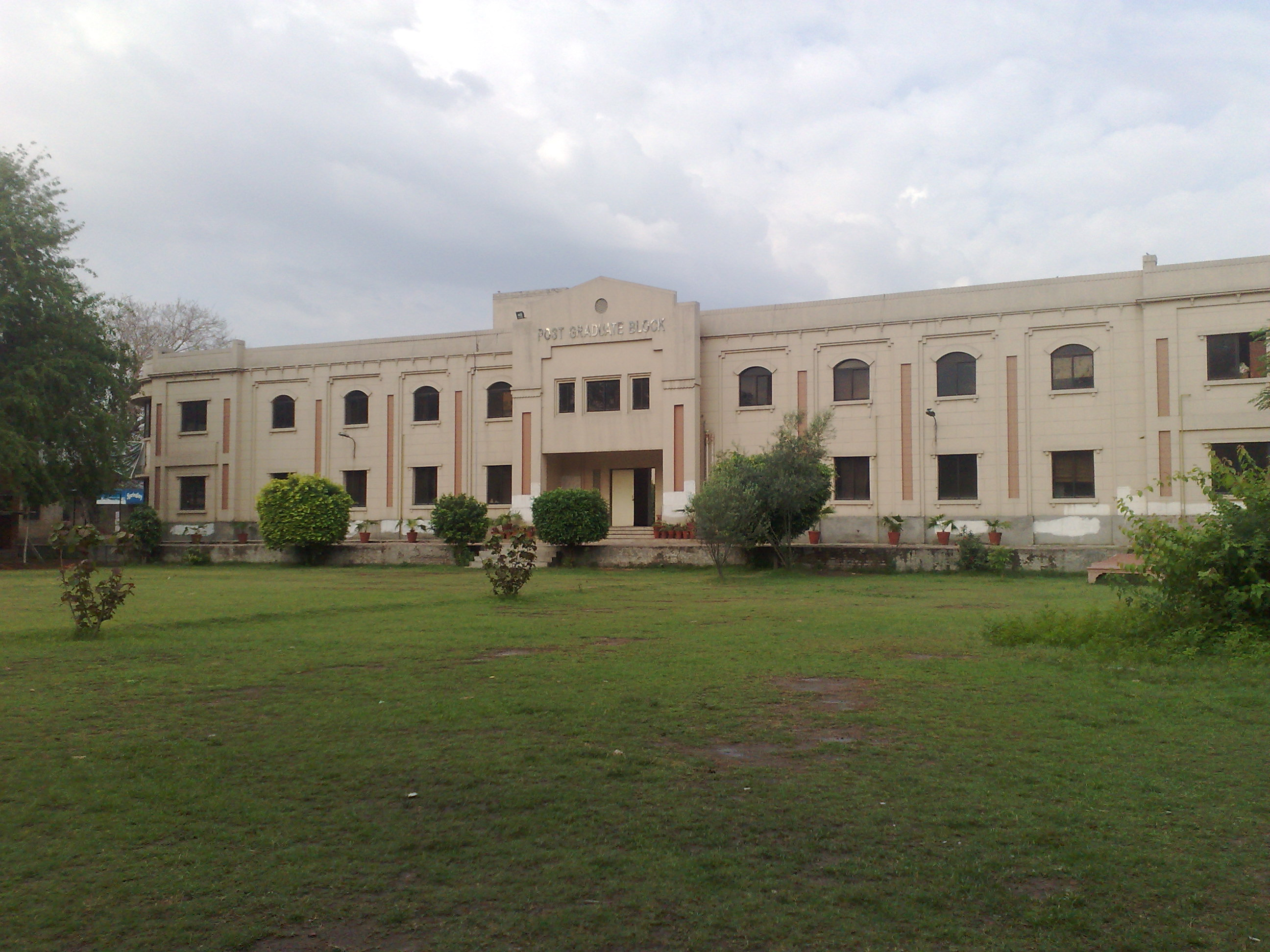
Postgraduate Block

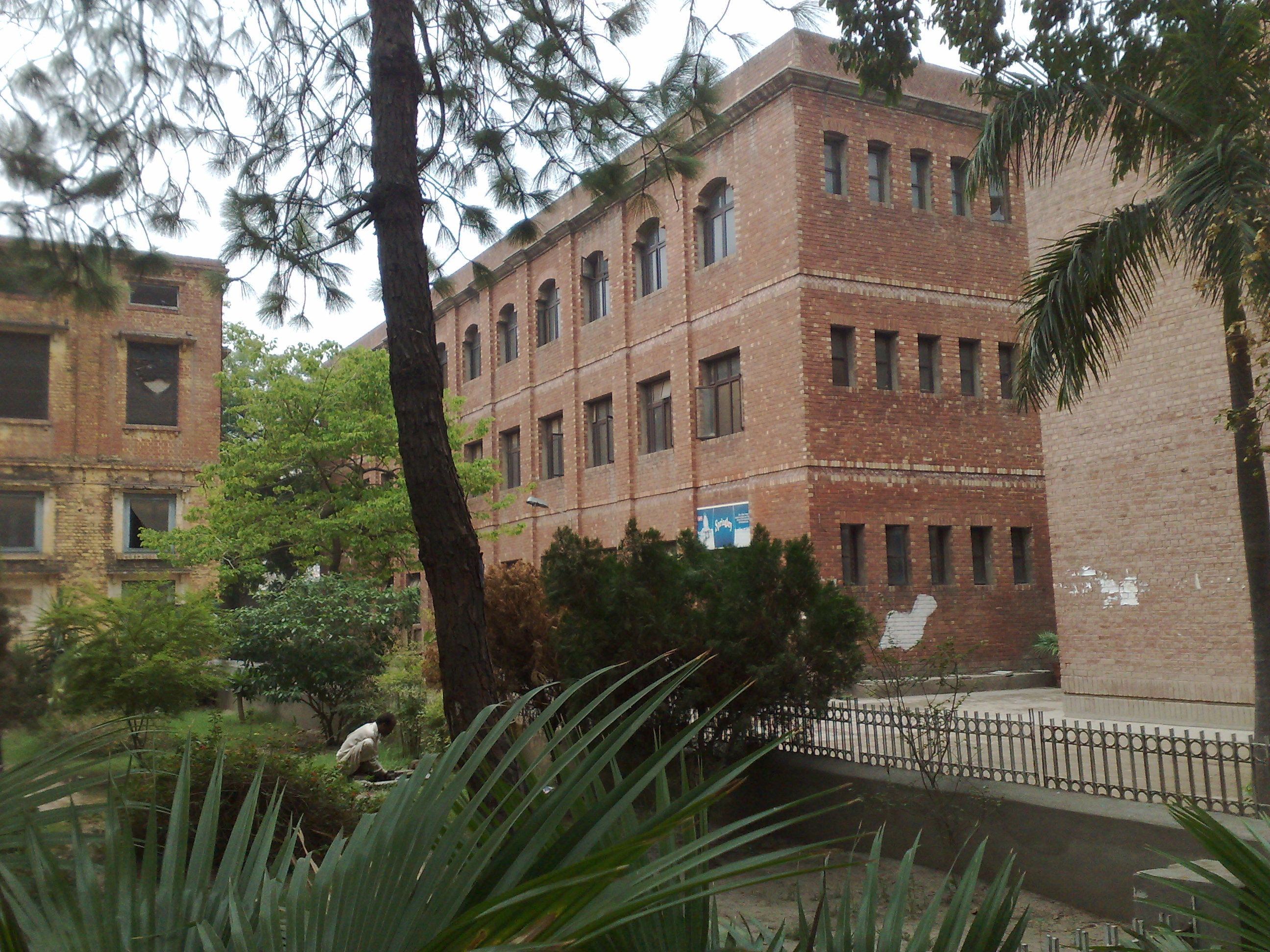
Commerce Block

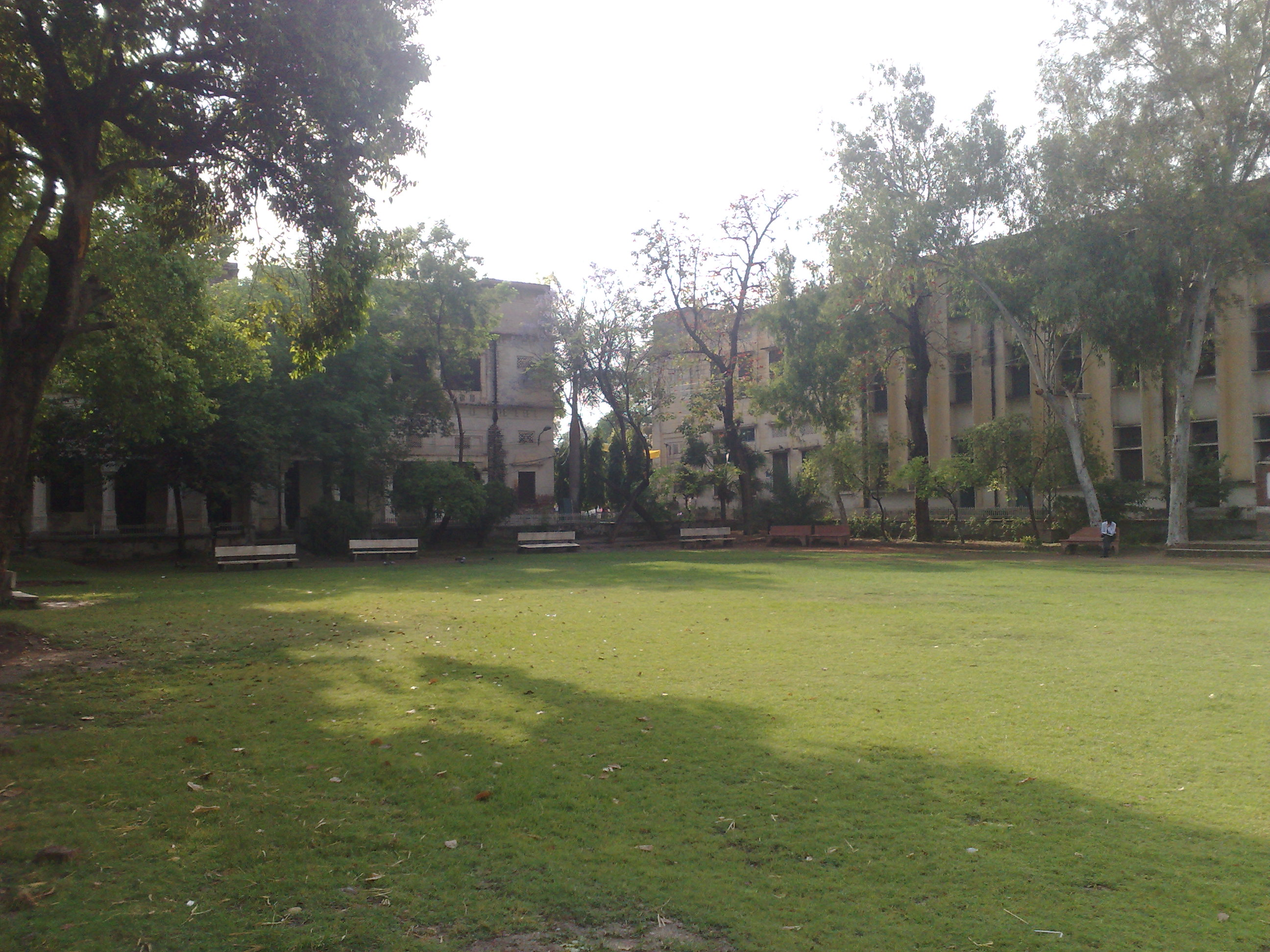
Karamat Block

=== Programs offered ===
Govt. M.A.O. College Lahore is currently offering educational programs at three levels (Intermediate, Undergraduate, and Postgraduate):

==== Intermediate ====
MAO College offers Intermediate programs only for boys and there is no co-education at this level. The College offers:

- F.A.
- F.Sc. (Pre-Medical)
- F.Sc. (Pre-Engineering)
- G.Sc.
- I.Com
- I.C.S (Physics)
- I.C.S (Statistics)

==== Undergraduate ====
Govt. M.A.O. College Lahore provides BS Honors (4-Year) co-education program at the undergraduate level. The College is affiliated with University of the Punjab for the following programs:

- BS Applied Psychology
- BBA
- BCom
- BS Botany
- BS Biochemistry
- BS Chemistry
- BS Data Science
- BS Digital Media
- BS Economics
- BS English
- BS Environmental Sciences
- BS Geographic Information System
- BS Gender Studies
- BS Information Technology
- BS Mathematics
- BS Mass Communication
- BS Physics
- BS Psychology
- BS Political Science
- BS Sociology

And the college is affiliated with Government College University, Lahore for the following programs:

- BS Biotechnology
- BS Computer Science

==== Postgraduate ====
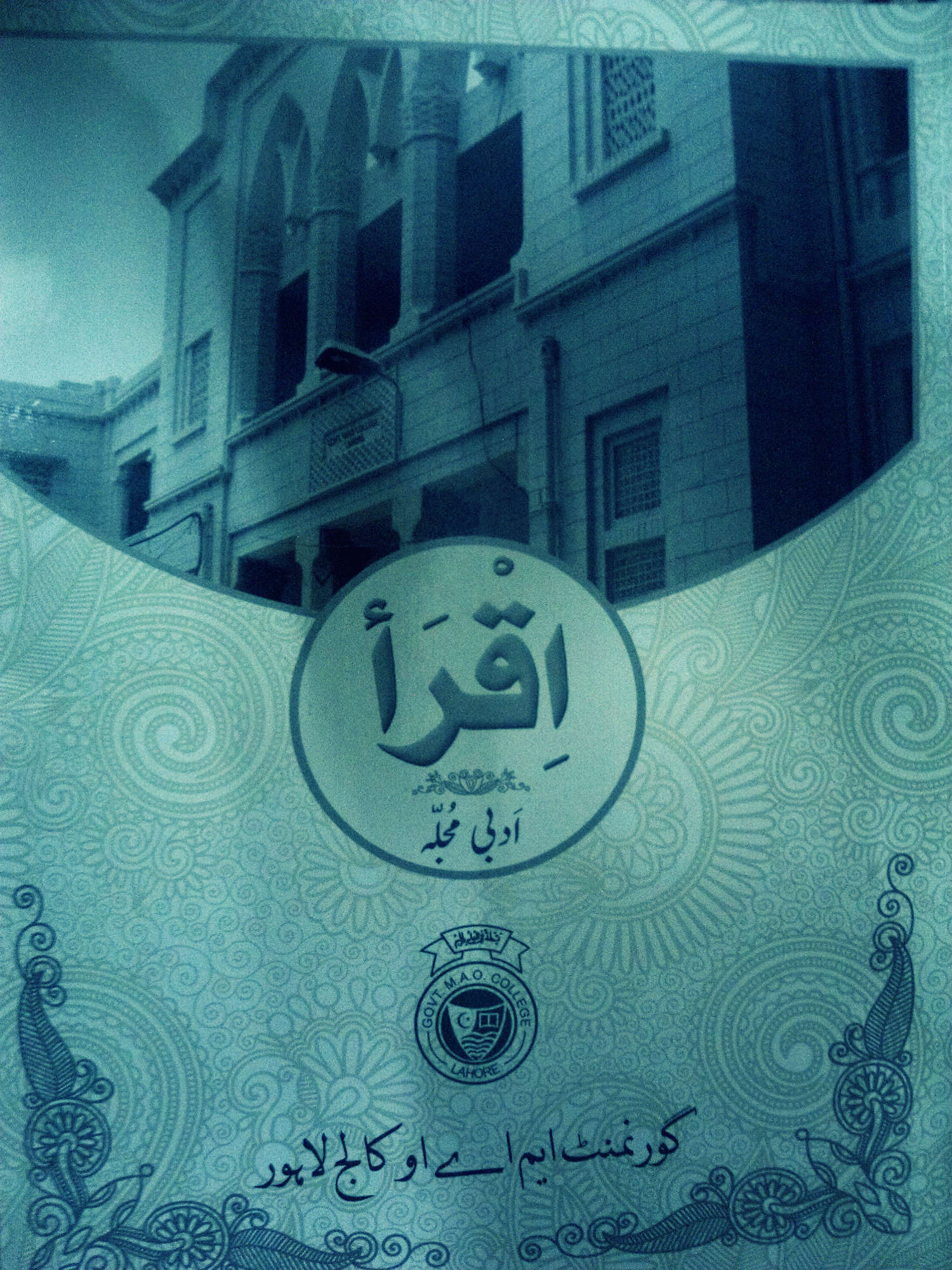
IQRA - College Magazine

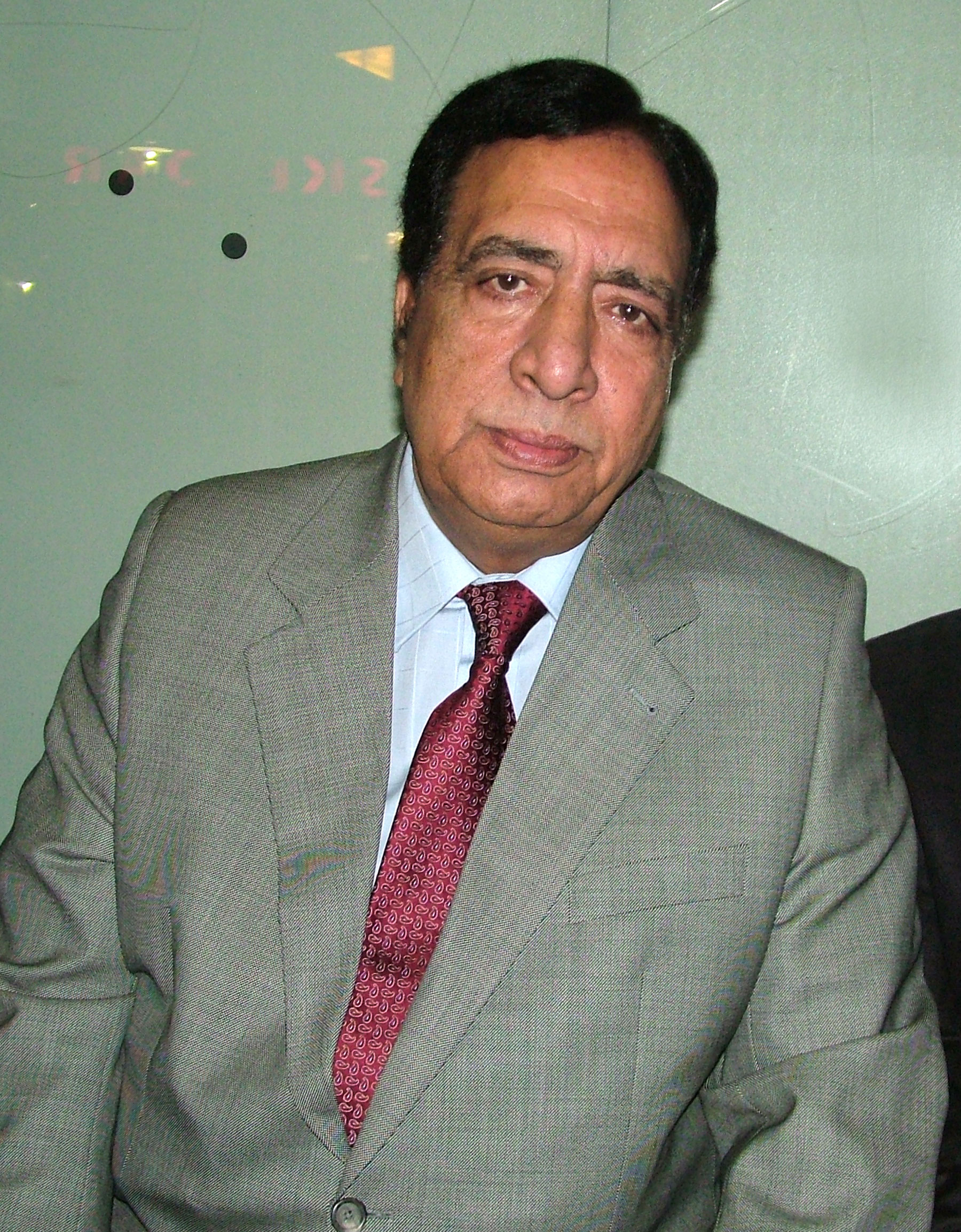
Atta ul Haq Qasmi

The college offers the following co-education postgraduate programs:

- M.A. English
- M.A. Mass Communication
- M.A. Urdu
- M.Sc. Mathematics
- M.Sc. Applied Psychology

== College magazine ==
College magazine “IQRA” is published annually under the supervision of College Magazine and Publication Committee with English, Urdu and Punjabi sections to explore the literary potentials of the students through their writings. Due to undisclosed reasons magazine could not be published in the three years (from 2010 to 2013). However, last Principal Prof. Rashid Najeeb took the responsibility and it was due to his efforts that “IQRA” was published again in 2014.

== Sports ==
MAO College is also well known for co-curricular, extracurricular, and sports activities. College students often take part in College, Board, and University level competitions. Cricket, Field Hockey, and Football teams are major representations of Govt. M.A.O. College in the sports fields. The college's alumni include many national players like Saeed Ajmal, Saqlain Mushtaq, Taufeeq Umar, and Salman Akbar. In addition, M.A.O. College made headlines when its first female principal, Dr. Aaliya Rehman Khan, was seen riding her bicycle to and from M.A.O. College every day. Her act aimed to educate students about the detrimental effects of carbon emissions on the environment while also promoting healthy lifestyles.

== Notable alumni ==
Alumni of Govt. M.A.O. College Lahore include:

=== Literature and arts ===
- Atta-ul-Haq Qasmi (poet, columnist, fournalist)
- Amjad Islam Amjad (poet)
- Masood Akhtar (actor)

=== Politics ===
- Khawaja Saad Rafique (former Minister for Pakistan Railways, politician, member of PML - N)

== Controversy ==
Government M.A.O College became topic of headlines in late 2019 after the suicide of an English professor after alleged harassment accusations which were later founded to be false.
