= Saha, Ambala =

Saha
- Rural
- Location in Haryana, India Saha (India)
- Coordinates: 30°18′N 76°58′E
- Country: India
- State: Haryana
- District: [[ saha district|Ambala]]
- Established: ancient

Government
  - Type: Democratic
  - Body: Government of Haryana
- Elevation: 275 m (902 ft)

Population
  - Total: 50,000

Languages
  - Official: Hindi, Haryanvi
- Time zone: UTC+5:30 (IST)
- PIN: 133104
- Area code: 133104
- ISO 3166 code: IN-HR
- Vehicle registration: HR
- Website: haryana.gov.in

Saha is a town and tehsil in Ambala district of Haryana state of India. The area is situated about 15.14 km from Ambala cantt and 23 km towards East from district headquarters in Ambala city on Ambala-Jagadhri highway. Saha is the major road junction in Ambala district as it provides road links to Jagadhri, Ambala Cantt, Panckula and Delhi towards its east, west, north, and south respectively. The area is considered as the biggest industrial area in Ambala district. Industries like Micron instrument industries, Indiamart, Coca-Cola are based here. Micron instrument industries are known for making scientific instruments like microscopes and other technical equipments. Industries in the area are situated on Saha-Panchkula Highway (NH73) and Saha-Sahabad Highway.

== Geography ==
Saha has an average elevation of 275 m above mean sea level. Nearby villages include Toba, Samlehri, Tepla (3 km), Kalpi (3 km), Rampur (4 km), and Nahoni (6 km). Saha is surrounded by Barara Tehsil towards the south, Shahzadpur Tehsil towards the north, Ambala Tehsil towards the west, and Shahbad Tehsil towards the south.
