= Ambala War Memorial =

- Interactive map of Ambala War Memorial
- Location: Ambala Cantonment, Haryana, India
- Coordinates: 30.3219°N 76.8406°E
- Type: War memorial and museum
- Dedicated to: Participants and martyrs of the Indian Rebellion of 1857
- Website: www.ambalawarmemorial.com

Ambala War Memorial, also known as the 1857 Shaheed Smarak or Azadi Ki Pehli Ladai Ka Shaheed Smarak, is a memorial and museum dedicated to the participants of the Indian Rebellion of 1857. It is located in Ambala, Haryana, India, along the National Highway 44. The complex honours the contribution of soldiers, civilians and other participants against the British rule.

Spread across approximately 22 acres, the complex includes a memorial tower, museum galleries, exhibition spaces and facilities for multimedia presentations. It was developed to highlight Ambala's role in the events of 1857 and recognise participants whose contributions have received comparatively limited attention in historical accounts.

== History ==
=== Background ===
The memorial commemorates the Indian Rebellion of 1857, which began as an uprising among Indian soldiers serving in the British East India Company's army and subsequently spread to several parts of the Indian subcontinent.

Ambala was one of the locations associated with the early events of the uprising. Historical accounts cited by researchers and the Haryana government identify a revolt among soldiers stationed in Ambala on 10 May 1857, several hours before the outbreak of the uprising at Meerut.

=== Construction ===
The memorial was developed along National Highway 44 in Ambala. The project involved the construction of a large museum complex featuring historical galleries, architectural installations and digital exhibits.

In May 2023, the Haryana government invited tenders for artwork and exhibition-related work worth approximately Rs 148.98 crore. At that time, the government had approved approximately Rs 437.90 crore for the project.

The project cost subsequently increased during construction. In October 2026, the estimated cost was reported to be approximately Rs 800 crore.

In June 2025, a committee of historians reviewed the museum's films and exhibition content. The review examined historical chronology, visual material, costumes, weapons and other period-specific details. Approximately 100 documentary-style films and 400 digital panels had been prepared for the museum.

== Architecture and facilities ==
The memorial complex covers approximately 22 acres and features a lotus-shaped memorial tower, which forms a prominent part of its architecture. The tower is equipped with high-speed lifts and includes a sky café.

The complex includes 23 galleries presenting different aspects of the 1857 uprising. These galleries cover events and locations associated with Ambala, Meerut, Delhi, Punjab, Gujarat, Jhansi and other parts of India.

Other facilities and installations include:

- A 2,500-seat open-air theatre.
- A 300-seat auditorium.
- A 360-degree projection system.
- Laser and sound shows.
- Interactive digital displays.
- Multimedia presentations depicting historical events.
- Exhibitions featuring archival material and historical narratives.

The museum uses immersive audiovisual technology to recreate scenes associated with the uprising, including battles, historical locations and the experiences of participants.

== Historical exhibits ==
The museum documents the events of 1857 through historical displays, films, paintings and interactive installations. Its exhibits cover the role of soldiers, farmers, women and civilians in the uprising.

According to reports published in October 2026, the names of more than 700 freedom fighters identified through historical research have been inscribed in gold at the memorial. The authorities have indicated that additional names may be included as further historical records become available.

The official memorial website also features historical material, including a telegram dated 10 May 1857 reporting unrest among Indian troops at Ambala Cantonment. The museum's exhibits are intended to present the events of the uprising in chronological order and explain its spread across different regions.

== Inauguration ==
On 5 November 2026, Union Home Minister Amit Shah inaugurated the memorial. The memorial, named Azadi Ki Pehli Ladai Ka Shaheed Smarak, will become a source of inspiration for the youth in the days to come, Shah said.
