= Ambala–Jagadhri Highway =

Road in Haryana, India

Ambala-Jagadhri highway
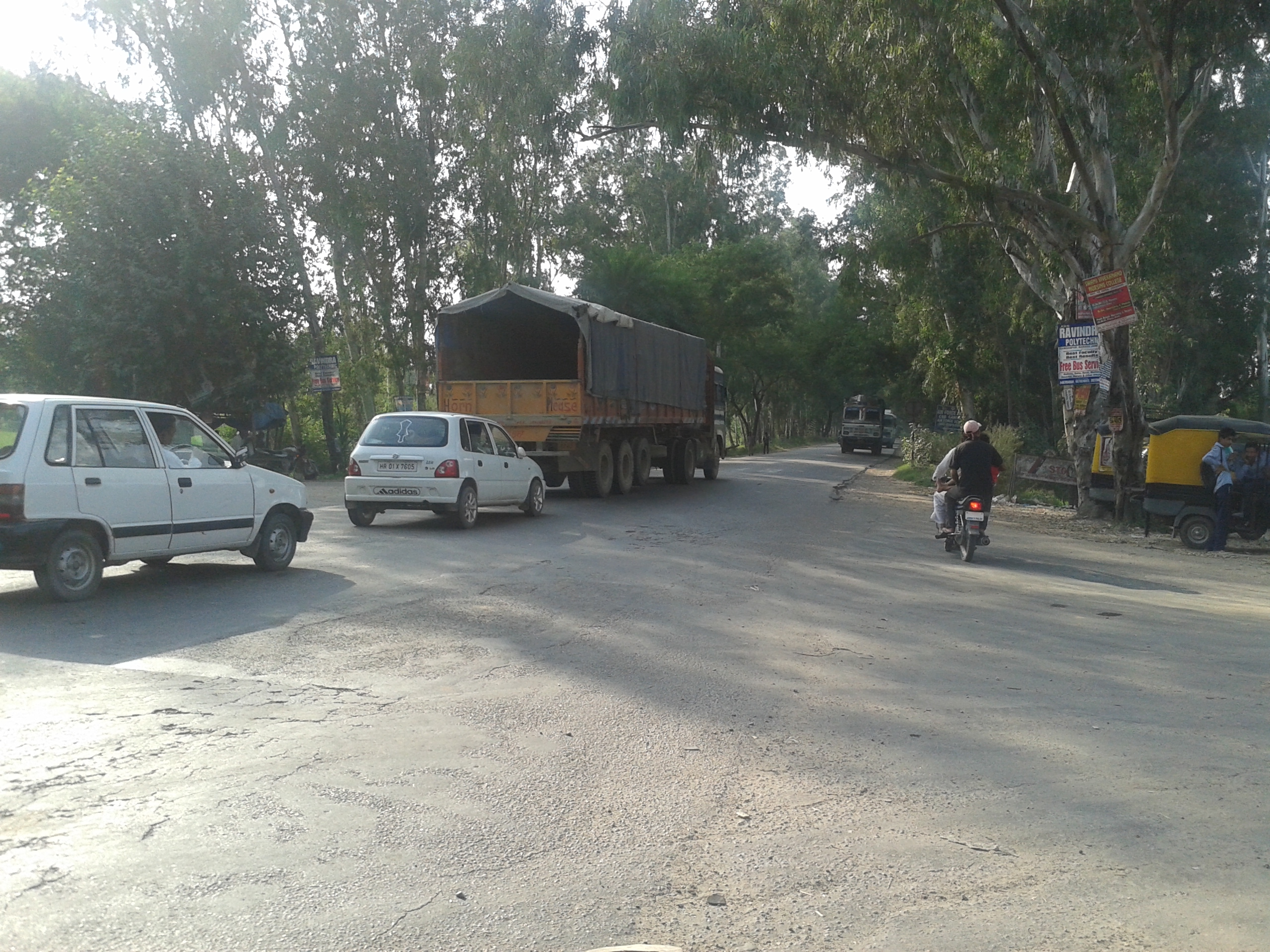
- Ambala-Jagadhri highway near Kalpi, Ambala

Route information
- Maintained by National Highways Authority of India
- Length: 50 km (31 mi)

Major junctions
- From: Ambala Cantonment, Ambala district
- To: Jagadhri, Yamuna Nagar district

Location
- Country: India
- Major cities: Ambala Cantonment, Saha, Mullana, Jagadhri

Highway system
- Roads in India; Expressways; National; State; Asian

Ambala Jagadhri road is the national highway and the road in Haryana, India. The road not only connects Dual city ("Dual city" is used in Ambala) – (Ambala city and Ambala cant) with Jagadhri. The condition of road is not like a national highway due to local politics of Haryana and is considered slow moving and accident prone.

== Geography ==
The total length of road is 50 kilometres (31 mi) and runs through Ambala district and Yamuna Nagar district. The road is maintained by Government of Haryana as it lies entirely in it. The major towns from where the highway passes are Mahesh Nagar, Saha, Kalpi, Mullana, do Sarka etc. Saha-Ambala highway is small section of this road and its length is 15.14 kilometres (9.41 mi). The road runs on almost same reduced level across its length with minimum number of road curves.

== Education ==
There are many engineering and medical colleges situated on the highway. These include Ambala College of Engineering & Applied Research, Kalpi Institute of Technology, Maharishi Markandeshwar University. Sanatan Dharma College, which was established around 1916 in Lahore in undivided India, is also situated on the highway near Ambala Cantonment (the college was uprooted during the partition of India and was reestablished in 1948 near Ambala Cant).

== Transport ==
The transport services on the highway is controlled by Haryana State Road Transport Corporation. Buses run on the road at regular intervals every day.

== See also ==
- Grand Trunk road
