= Kalpi, Ambala =

- Rural
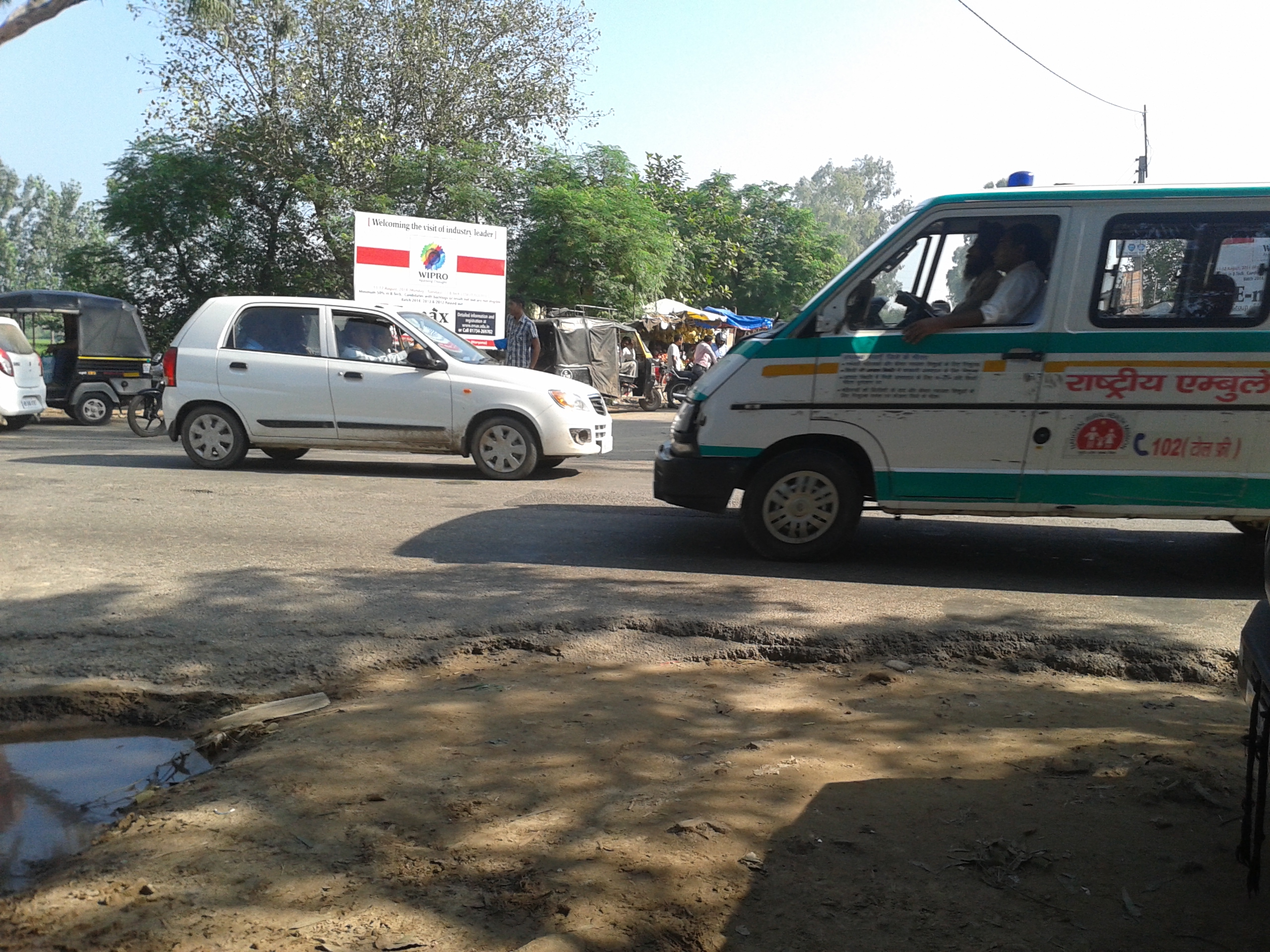

- Location in Haryana, India Kalpi, Ambala (India)
- Coordinates: 30.22°N 76.46°E
- Country: India
- State: Haryana
- District: Ambala
- Established: 14th century CE
- Elevation: 264 m (866 ft)

Languages
  - Official: Hindi, Regional Haryanvi
- Time zone: UTC+5:30 (IST)
- PIN: 133104
- Vehicle registration: HR
- Website: haryana.gov.in

Kalpi is the notified area in municipal committee of Ambala, Haryana, India. It is situated on Ambala-Jagadhri highway (i.e. National highway 73) in Saha tehsil about 19.3 km from Ambala Cantt. The coordinates of the region are latitude=30.3781838 and longitude= 76.7766924. The postal code of the area is 133104. The area is home for big air force base of India. This unit is known as Air Force and has been active in all indo-pak wars. The air force camp also runs the school by the name of Air Force School, to provide quality education to the local residents. Institute of engineering and technology is the institute of higher education situated in the area. Moreover, there are many educational institutes situated in vicinity which include Maharishi Markandeshwar University and Education Maximum School of Engineering and Applied Research. The residential population of the area highly depend upon crop cultivation for their daily earnings. People mostly cultivate rice, wheat, barley, sugar cane and vegetables throughout the year.

== See also ==
- Kalpi
- Ambala Cantonment
- Harbon
- Kurali
