= Philadelphia Hospital & School of Nursing, Ambala =

Nursing school and hospital in Haryana, India

- Type: Private
- Established: 1887
- Accreditation: Indian Nursing Council, Haryana Nursing Council, Medical Council of India
- Director: Sunil Kumar Sadiq
- Undergraduates: 100 per year
- Location: Ambala, Haryana, India; 24.43°N 86.62°E
- Website: www.philhosp.org

The Philadelphia Hospital & School of Nursing, Ambala, comprises two sisterly organisations: the Philadelphia Hospital, Ambala, and the Philadelphia School of Nursing, Ambala. These institutes provide community health and education.

== History ==
The hospital was opened in 1901 by Dr Jessica Carlton, an American missionary from Philadelphia, USA, who came to Ambala in 1887.

The Philadelphia School of Nursing, Ambala, is the sister organisation of the Philadelphia Hospital, Ambala. The School of Nursing is a pioneering institute of medical training in India. The School of Nursing was established in 1924. In the beginning it had a nursing staff of one trained American nurse and ten Indian trainees. The first batch of nurses—when medical care for women was almost unheard of except for the traditional midwives—were trained in general nursing, anatomy, physiology and midwifery. The School of Nursing is recognized by the Indian Nursing Council and the Haryana Nursing Council.

=== Diploma courses ===
	Discipline	Intake	Full-time or part-time
1	General nursing	40	Full-time
2	Midwifery	20	Full-time
