= Philadelphia Hospital, Ambala =

Hospital in Ambala, Haryana, India

Philadelphia Hospital is a hospital in Ambala, Haryana, India. It was started by an American missionary Jessica Carleton R in 1887.

== History ==
In 1887 Dr. Jessica Carlton, an American missionary from Philadelphia, USA, came to Ambala and opened a multi-room dispensary in a small building. Though a pioneer, her predecessors from Philadelphia had already arrived in Ludhiana almost fifty years earlier, dedicating themselves to missionary services in Punjab.

Within two years the dispensary was shifted to a larger building in the market place, and after a few more years, in 1894, with fees from royal patrons in the province, Dr. Carlton built a small hospital which would later be known as the "Old Hospital", and would become the forerunner to the "Philadelphia Hospital for Women". Built with the money from silver offering of the 25th year of the Womans Foreign Missionary Society of the Philadelphia Board - Philadelphia Hospital for Women, as it was named at that time, was constructed in 1901.

The hospital established its Nursing School in 1924. By this time it had grown to a 45-bed hospital, had two missionary doctors, a nursing superintendent and 10 Indian staff members. The appreciation of all these years of selfless missionary work culminated in 1927. Dr Carlton was awarded the Kaisar-i-Hind by the King for her services to health care in India. In 1934 the hospital was opened to male patients.

Being a frontier city with an army cantonment and a busy railway junction, Ambala played a crucial role during the partition of India, and the hospital in those days of conflict and resettlement, served the nation by running refugee camps providing health care. For public services rendered Dr. Ivanoel Gibbins too was awarded the Kaisar-i-Hind gold medal, by King George V.

By 1951, under the directorship of Dr. Gibbins, the current Philadelphia Hospital building was constructed as a 150-bed hospital. It was inaugurated by the first Health Minister of independent India, Rajkumari Amrit Kaur. By 1970s the complete management of Philadelphia Hospital was taken over by Indian Directors and management.
