= Government Polytechnic College, Ambala =

College in Haryana, India

- Government Polytechnic College
- Former names: Govt. Industrial School, Metal Work Institute, Govt. Technical Institute
- Motto: Siksha Sanskar Rozgar
- Motto in English: Education Elegance Employment
- Type: Government agency
- Established: 1929
- Accreditation: AICTE, New Delhi
- Academic affiliations: Haryana State Board of Technical Education, Haryana
- Principal: Rajiv Sapra
- Students: c. 729
- Location: Ambala, Haryana, India
- Campus: 31,577.92 m^{2} (339,901.9 sq ft)
- Colours: Grey & black
- Website: gpambala.ac.in

Government Polytechnic College, Ambala is a co-educational institution of higher learning located in the town of Ambala in the Ambala region of Haryana. The institute was established in 1929, by the government of India. It was re-established in 1958 is affiliated with the Haryana State Board of Technical Education (HSBTE), Panchkula and approved by All India Council of Technical Education, New Delhi (AICTE) and the Department of Technical Education, Government of Haryana (DTE). It is one of the best in North India. Diploma holders from this institute serve in various government organizations and institutions all over India.

== History ==
Govt Polytechnic, Ambala is situated in the heart of Ambala City. The Polytechnic institute began as Government/ Industrial School in 1929 later it was developed to Metal Works Institute in 1933 was recognized in 1948 & was thereafter known as Government Technical Institute. In 1958, the Institution was renamed as Government Polytechnic.

== Location ==
It is situated on Ambala City-Chandigarh road at a distance of 1 km from the bus stand, and 8.1 km from the Ambala Cantonment railway junction. The institution is spread over a land area of 24.6 acres.

== Departments ==
- Architecture
- Auto Engineering
- Applied Science
- Civil Engineering
- Computer Engineering
- Electrical Engineering
- Electronics and Communication Engineering
- Mechanical Engineering
- Plastic Engineering
- Training and Placement Cell
- Workshop

== Academic programs ==
Government Polytechnic College, Ambala awards undergraduate diploma in various engineering fields in a three-year engineering programme. The college also provides the classes of Govt. Polytechnic, Umri in architecture.

=== Diploma courses ===
	Discipline	Intake	Full/part time
1	Architecture	60	Full time
2	Automobile engineering	60	Full time
3	Computer engineering	60	Full time
4	Civil engineering	60	Full time
5	Electronics and Communication engineering	60	Full time
6	Mechanical engineering	60	Full time
7	Plastic engineering	60	Full time
8	Electrical engineering	60	Full time

=== CEGO scheme ===
The following courses are running under CEGO Scheme:

Sr.	Course	Duration
1.	Beautician	720 hours
2.	Computer Operator	720 hours
3.	Garment Making	690 hours
4.	Beautician	690 hours

=== Scheme of Community Development Through Polytechnics (CDTP) ===
Sr.	Course	Duration
1.	Beautician	Six months
2.	Computer Operator	Six months
3.	Electrician & House Wiring	Six months
4.	English & Hindi Typing	Six months
5.	Garment Making	690 hours
6.	Plumbing & Sanitary Fitting	Six months
7.	Textile Designing include Machine Embroidery	Six months
8.	Welding & Fabrication	Six months
