= Talib Dehlavi =

Indian Urdu poet (1910 – 1975)

Talib Delhvi
- طالب دہلوی
- Born: Sheshchandra Saxena; 12 February 1910; Ambala, Haryana, India
- Died: 16 February 1975 (aged 65)
- Education: Hindu College, Delhi
- Occupations: poet, lyricist and translator

Talib Dehlavi (born Sheshchandra Saxena, 12 February 1910 – 16 February 1975, Urdu: طالب دہلوی) was an Indian Urdu poet, lyricist and translator from Delhi.

== Early life and education ==
Talib Dehlavi, born Sheshchandra Saxena, was born on 12 February 1910 in Ambala district, where his father, Rai Sahib Mahesh Das, served as an Honorary Magistrate. He received his early education and training in Ambala, completing his high school education there. He then returned to his native Delhi for higher education, passing his intermediate and BA examinations from Mission College and Hindu College.

== Life ==
Talib began writing poetry during his student days at Mission College (later St. Stephen's College). For guidance and reformation in poetry, he chose to be a student of his real uncle, Munshi Raj Bahadur Barak Dehlvi. Talib was not only an eloquent poet but also an excellent prose writer and translator. Due to financial comfort, he was freed from the hassles of employment. He worked with the monthly "Aaj Kal," the daily "Tej," and the American Reporter in Urdu as a hobby and pastime. Throughout his life, he was dedicated to the promotion of the Urdu language and served it without seeking reward or praise.

Not only did he contribute significantly as a poet, increasing the poetic capital of the Urdu language, but he also organized annual mushairas for twelve years in memory of his teacher, Munshi Barak Dehlvi, thereby setting a historical precedent for Urdu poetry in Delhi. There is hardly any notable poet or writer in India who has not participated in these mushairas or who has not presented a paper on Munshi Barak Dehlvi.

== Selected works ==
Talib Dehlavi authored several notable works. Here are some of his books:

- "Anwar-e-Nazar" (1965): A collection of his ghazals and poems.
- "Harf-e-Natamam" (1941): Another compilation of his poetic works.
- "Kashmeer Ki Sair" (1966): A travelogue that explores the beauty and culture of Kashmir.
- "Khadang-e-Naaz": A recitation collection.
- "Khumnistan-e-Kaifi" (1951): A book associated with the poet Kaifi Azmi.
- "Raag Rang": A poetic work.
- "Sabza-e-Begana" (1968): Yet another collection of his ghazals.
- "Ye Thi Dilli" (1975): A book that reflects on the city of Delhi.
