= Sanatan Dharma College =

College in Ambala Cantonment, Haryana, India

Coordinates: 30.3389971°N 76.8538885°E

- Established: 1916
- Affiliations: Kurukshetra University, Kurukshetra
- Principal: Dr. Rajinder Singh
- Academic staff: >100
- Administrative staff: >30
- Students: 2500-3000
- Undergraduates: 2000-2200
- Postgraduates: 200-300
- Location: Ambala Cantonment, Haryana, India
- Campus: Urban
- Website: www.sdcollegeambala.ac.in

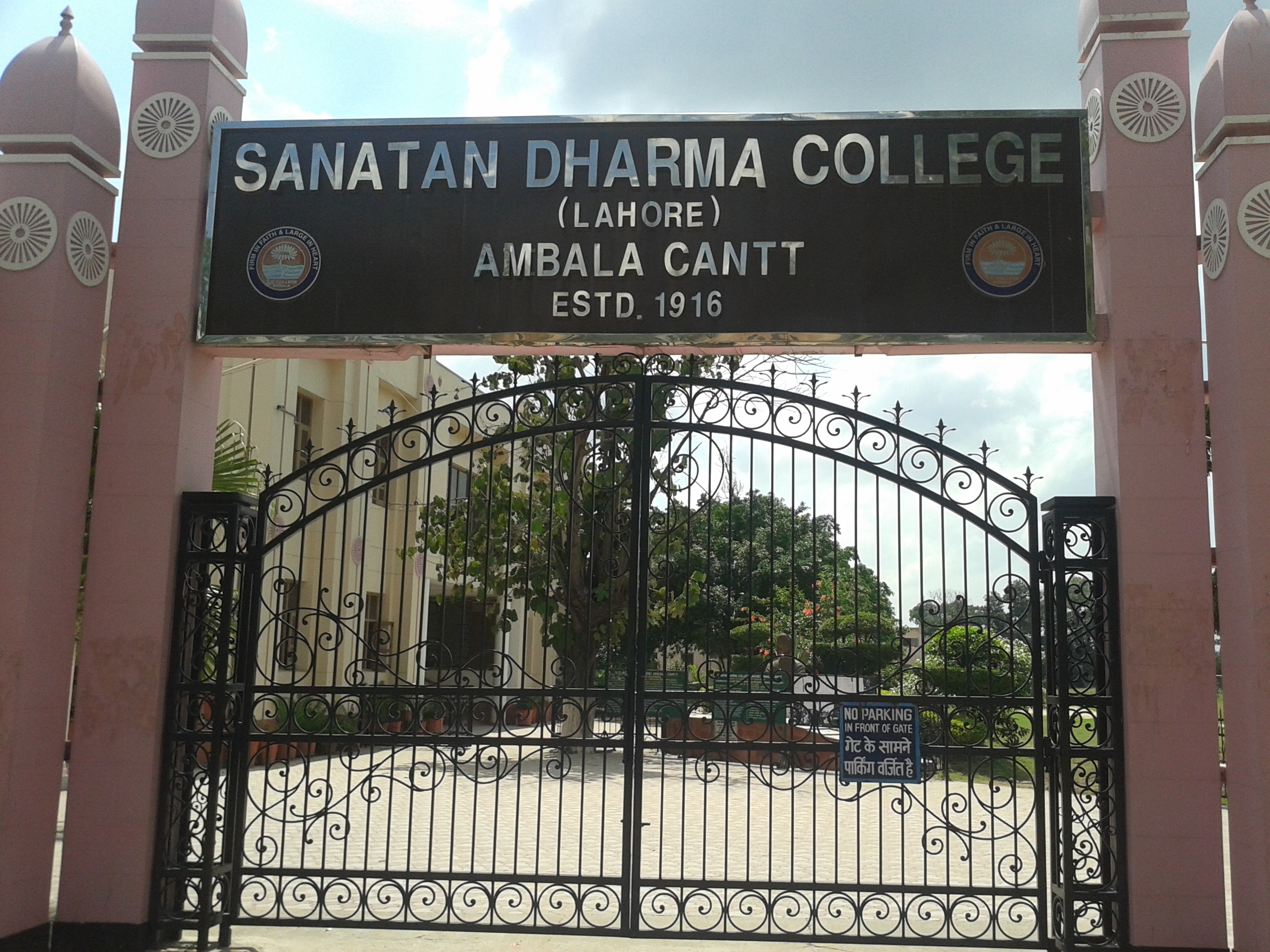
Sanatan Dharma College campus

Sanatan Dharma College commonly known as S.D. College, is a graduate and post graduate college, established in 1916 and situated in Ambala Cantonment, India on the Ambala-Jagadhri highway. Originally established in Lahore, the college was re-established in Ambala in 1948 after the partition of India in 1947.

It amongst three colleges in the state of Haryana to be granted the status of 'College with Potential for Excellence' by the University Grants Commission (UGC), Delhi for 2014 to 2019. It is accredited as a grade "A+" college by the National Assessment and Accreditation Council (NAAC), Bangalore in its 3rd cycle.

== History ==
The college was established in the year 1916 in Lahore, which was then the capital of undivided Punjab, and an education hub. During the last decade of 19th century, and early 20th century, the Sanatana Dharma Sabha had become a popular movement in the region and established a number of schools and colleges in the region. The founders of the college were great sanatanis Pandit Madan Mohan Malviya and Pandit Deen Dayal Vachaspati. Pandit Rekhi Ram was most instrumental in collection of huge amount of donation for development of college. During the partition of India in 1947, the college was uprooted from Lahore and was rehabilitated in 1948 near Ambala Cantt. The Campus of Lahore was reopened as MAO College .The college was re-established at Ambala Cantt due to efforts of Goswami Ganesh Dutt and other members of college's management.

The foundation stone at Ambala was laid by first President of India, Rajendra Prasad. Thereafter a local Sanatana Dharma Sabha played a key role in its development. In May 1949, the convocation of the college was addressed by noted leader Syama Prasad Mookerjee.

The college is affiliated to Kurukshetra University, Kurukshetra for all academic purposes. The college is now run by S.D college society, New Delhi. The parent body of which is Sanatan Dharma Pratinidni Sabha, New Delhi. The college also has a unit of National Service Scheme (NSS) unit with 123 volunteers, 50 males and 73 females.

In 2010, the college was granted the status of ‘College with Potential for Excellence’ by the University Grants Commission (UGC). Thereafter in 2014, it was regranted the status for the period for 2014-2019.

== Notable alumni ==
- Sushma Swaraj, politician and former Minister of External Affairs of India.
- Abdus Salam, Nobel Prize Winner from Pakistan when the college was in Lahore before partition in 1947.
- Anilendra Ganguly, the mathematics teacher of Abdus Salam and the recipient of the Sir Deva Prasad Sarbadhikari Gold Medal (1981) from the University of Calcutta.

== See also ==
- Education Maximum School of Engineering and Applied Research
- Goswami Ganesh Dutta Sanatan Dharma College
