= European Cemetery =

Cemetery in Haryana, India

Coordinates: 30.3454°N 76.8428°E

The European Cemetery or Ambala Christian Cemetery, established around 1843, is a state protected monument at Ambala district in Haryana. The occupancy right and management of the Cemetery is with the British High Commission. There are 66 graves of martyrs of World War I. The war graves comes under the protection of the Commonwealth War Graves Commission ( CWGC). It is also known as a military cemetery, as there are many graves and monuments erected in the memory of soldiers served in the Indian Army of the British era. The graves found here are in the European Architecture. After Independence, the Cemetery is taken care by Ambala Cemetery Committee and the Honorary Secretary of the Committee is the Parish Priest of Holy Redeemer Church (Catholic Church) and maintains approximately 200,000 graves in the cemetery.

== Legend ==
During the period from 1899 to 1902, the British sent hundreds of Boer prisoners to Sri Lanka, India and other colonies. Many of these prisoners were kept at Ambala Jail. A number of Boer prisoners never returned to their country and died in Ambala. Twenty Boers were buried in the European Cemetery. A commemorative pillar was erected to mark their graves. The surviving Boers came to an agreement with the British to fight jointly against the Blacks.

The European Cemetery is also the resting place of some of the last East India Company officials who served in India.

== Gallery ==
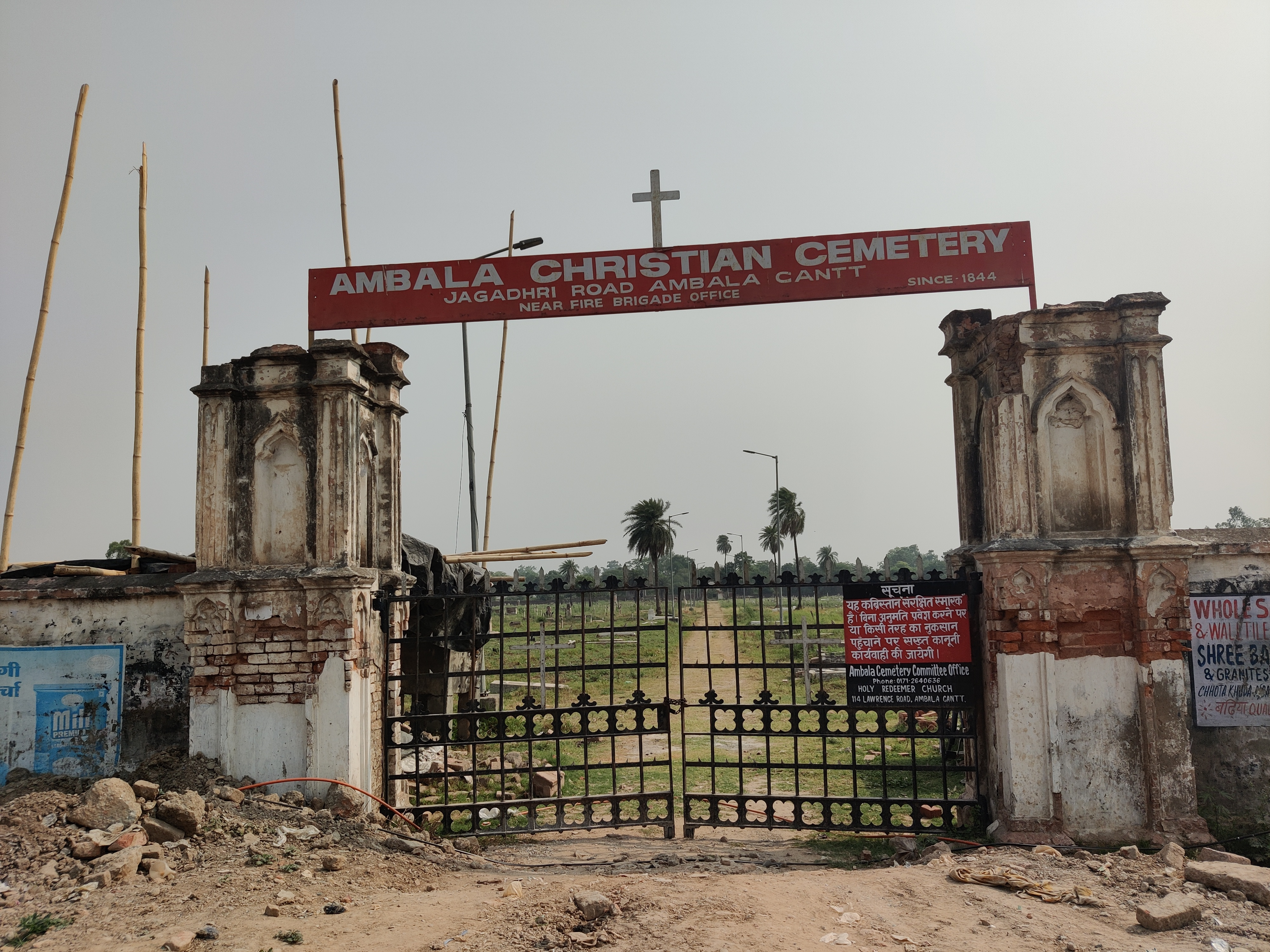
Ambala Christian Cemetery entrance gate

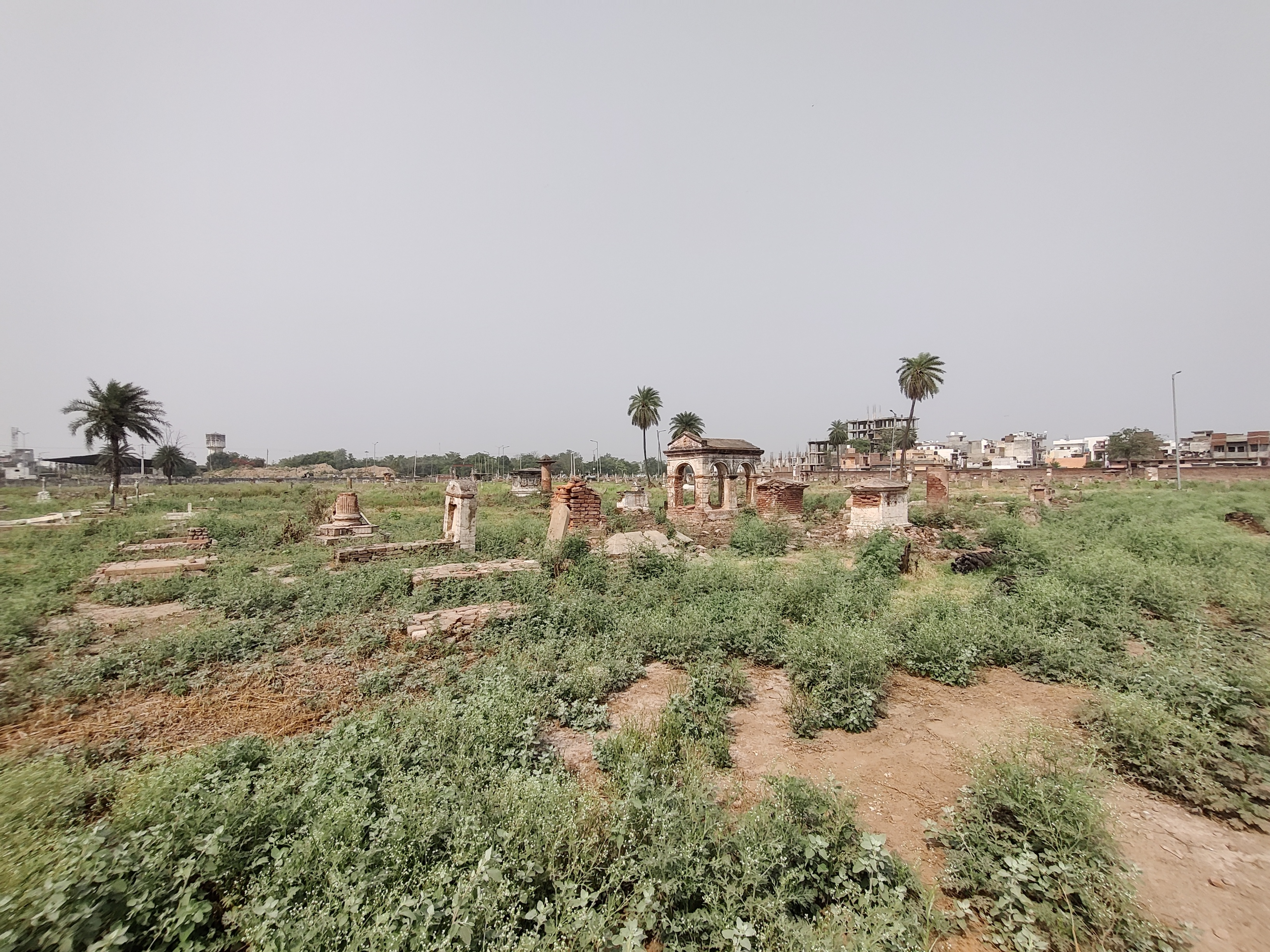
Ambala Christian Cemetery

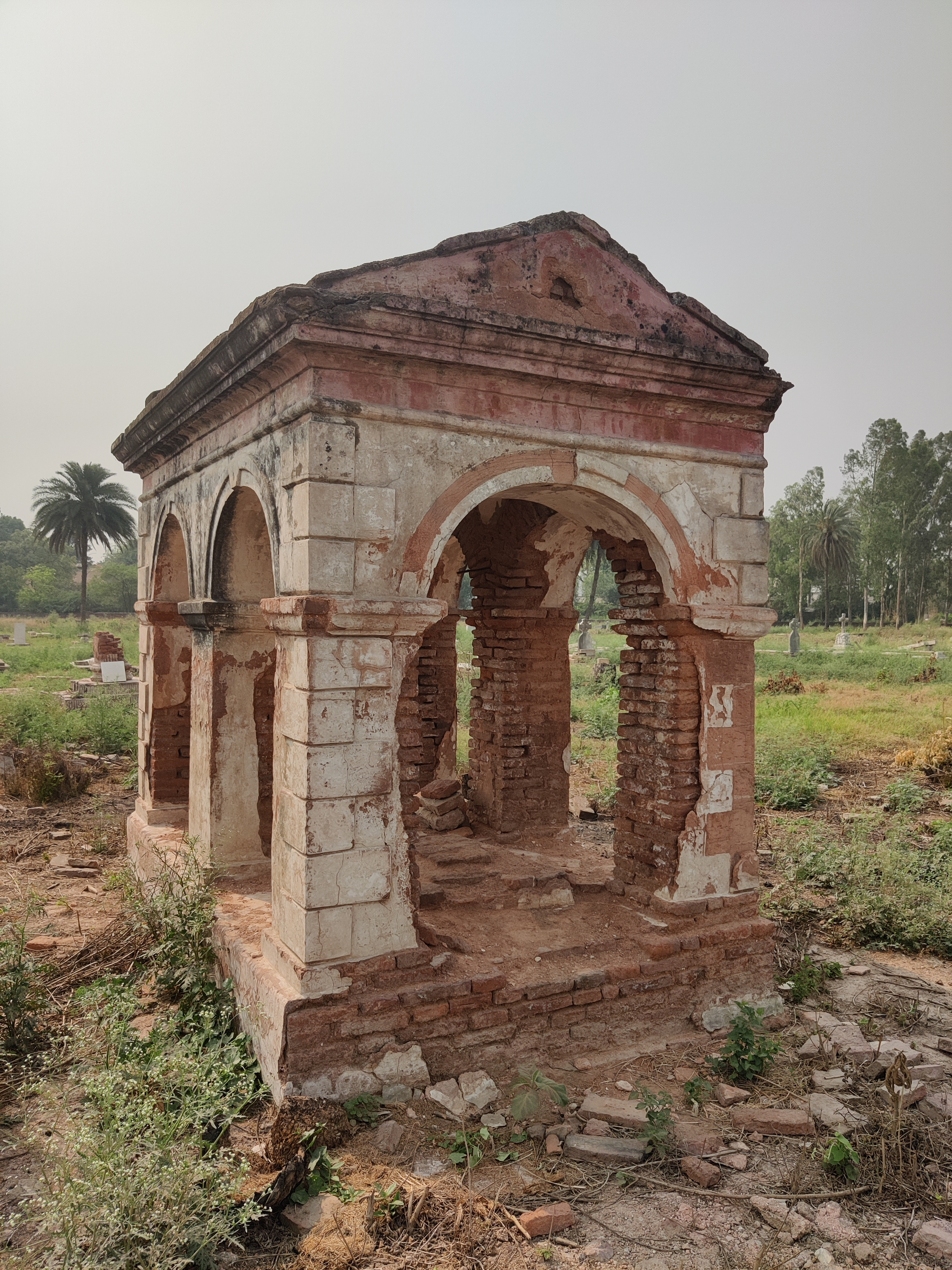
Ambala Christian Cemetery

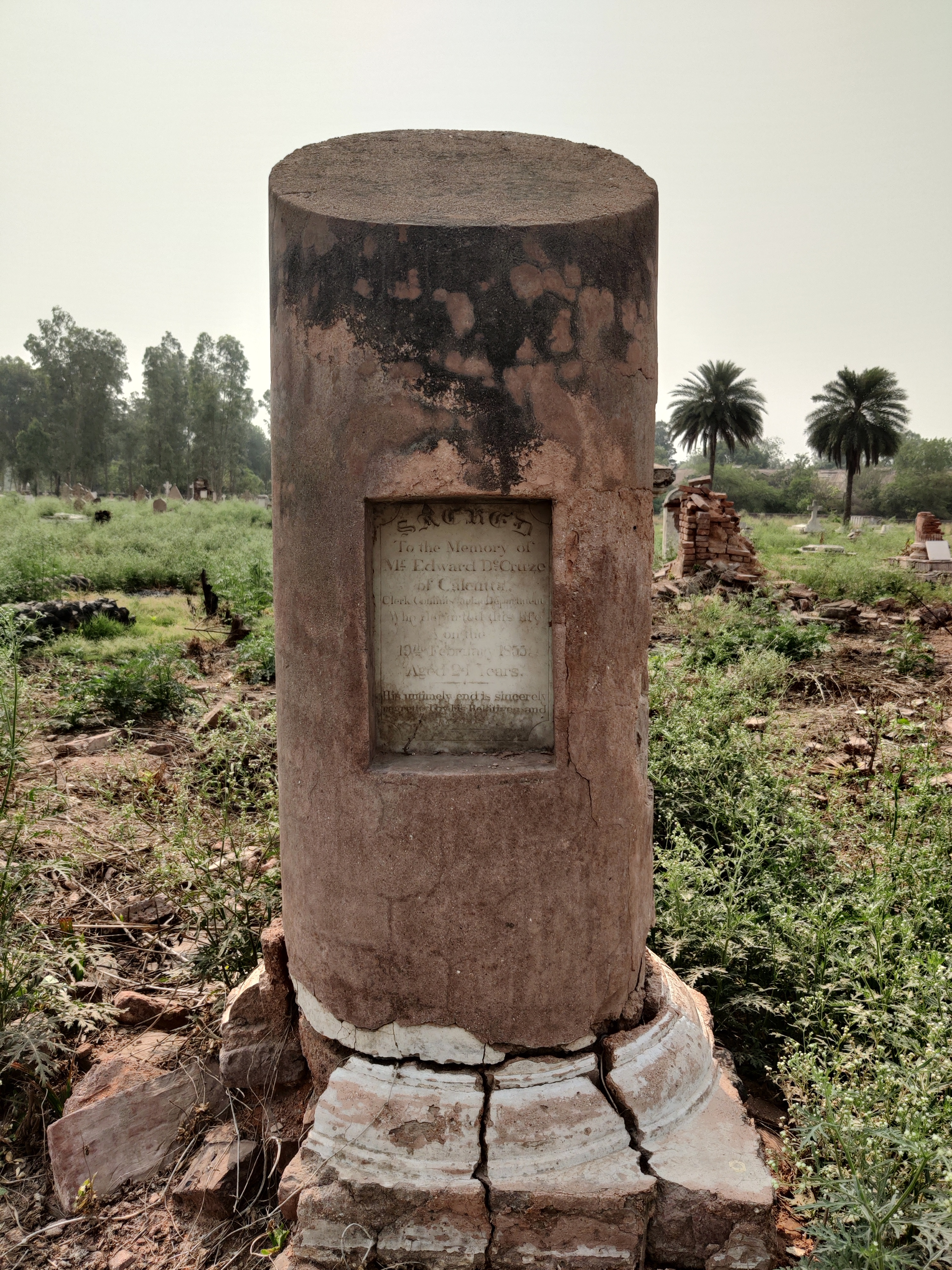
A grave at Ambala Christian Cemetery
