= Ambala =

City in Haryana, India

- City
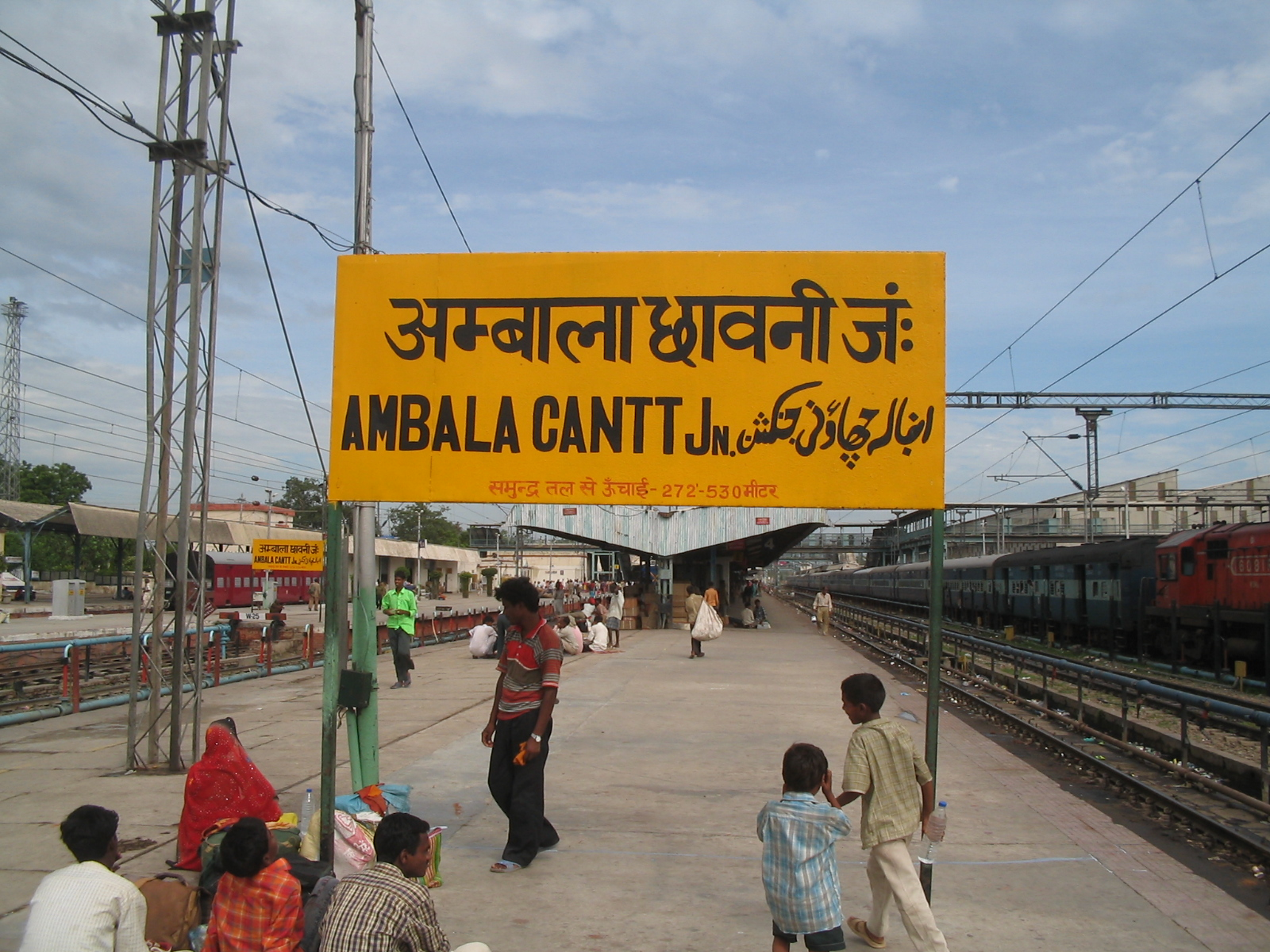
- Ambala Cantonment Railway Station, Haryana, India

- Location in Haryana, India Ambala (India)
- Coordinates: 30.38°N 76.78°E
- Country: India
- State: Haryana
- District: Ambala
- Established: 14th century CE
- Founder: Amba Rajput
- Named for: Amba Rajput, Bhawani Amba (Goddess)

Government
  - Type: Municipal corporation
  - Body: Ambala Municipal Corporation
  - Mayor: Akshita Saini (BJP)
  - Lok Sabha MP: Varun Chaudhary (INC)
  - MLA: Nirmal Singh (INC); Anil Vij (BJP)
  - Municipal Commissioner: Sachin Gupta (IAS)
- Elevation: 264 m (866 ft)

Population (2011)
  - Total: 207,934 (UA)
- Demonym: Ambalvi

Languages
  - Official: Hindi
  - Additional official: English, Punjabi
  - Regional: Puadhi; Haryanvi (Ambalvi)
- Time zone: UTC+5:30 (IST)
- PIN: 1330xx,1340xx
- Telephone code: 0171
- ISO 3166 code: IN-HR
- Vehicle registration: HR 01 (city), HR 04 (Naraingarh), HR 54 (Barara), HR 85 (Ambala Cantonment), HR37 (commercial)
- Website: ambala.gov.in

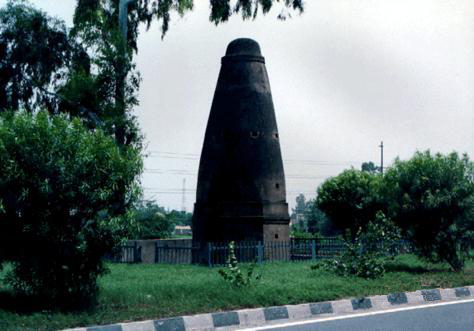
Kos Minar near Ambala along Grand Trunk Road in Haryana

Ambala (Hindi: Ambālā, pronounced [əmbalaː]) is a city and municipal corporation in the Ambala district of Haryana, India. It is situated on the border between the states of Punjab and Haryana, in close proximity to Chandigarh, the shared capital of both states.

Geographically and administratively, the urban area is divided into two distinct parts separated by a distance of eight kilometres: Ambala Cantonment (also known as Ambala Cantt) and Ambala City, collectively referred to as the "Twin Cities". The cantonment hosts a major presence of both the Indian Army and the Indian Air Force. Ambala is located 200 kilometres (124 mi) north of New Delhi, India's capital, and has been designated as a counter-magnet city for the National Capital Region (NCR) to serve as an alternative centre of regional growth.

Ambala acts as a drainage divide separating the Ganges river network from the Indus river network and is surrounded by the Ghaggar and Tangri rivers to the north and south, respectively. Due to its strategic geographic position, the Ambala district is a regional transit hub for tourism. The city is situated 47 km (29 mi) south of Chandigarh, 50 km (31 mi) north of Kurukshetra, 148 km (92 mi) southwest of Shimla, 198 km (123 mi) north of New Delhi and 260 km (160 mi) southeast of Amritsar.

== History ==
=== Etymology ===
The town is said to derive its name from Amba Rajput, who supposedly founded it during the 14th century CE. Alternatively, it is said to be named after the goddess Bhawani Amba, whose temple still exists in the city. The English spelling Umballa has sometimes been used, for example by Rudyard Kipling in his 1901 novel Kim.

=== Classical era ===
Archaeological surveyor C.J. Rodgers found Indo-Parthian Kingdom coins as well as coins of Hunas, Mihirakula, and Toramana, which indicated that after the disintegration of the Mauryan empire, the area was taken over by Indo-Parthians and later incorporated into the domain of the Hunas.

=== Late medieval era ===
In 1709, in the Battle of Ambala, the Sikhs captured Ambala from the Mughals. The city was under the rule of Gill Jats from 1748 to 1825. It was also the capital of Nishanwalia Misl. For some time, the city was under the rule of Jawahir Singh of Mustafabad, a descendant of Desu Singh Randhawa.

=== British colonial era ===
==== The Ambala Cantonment ====
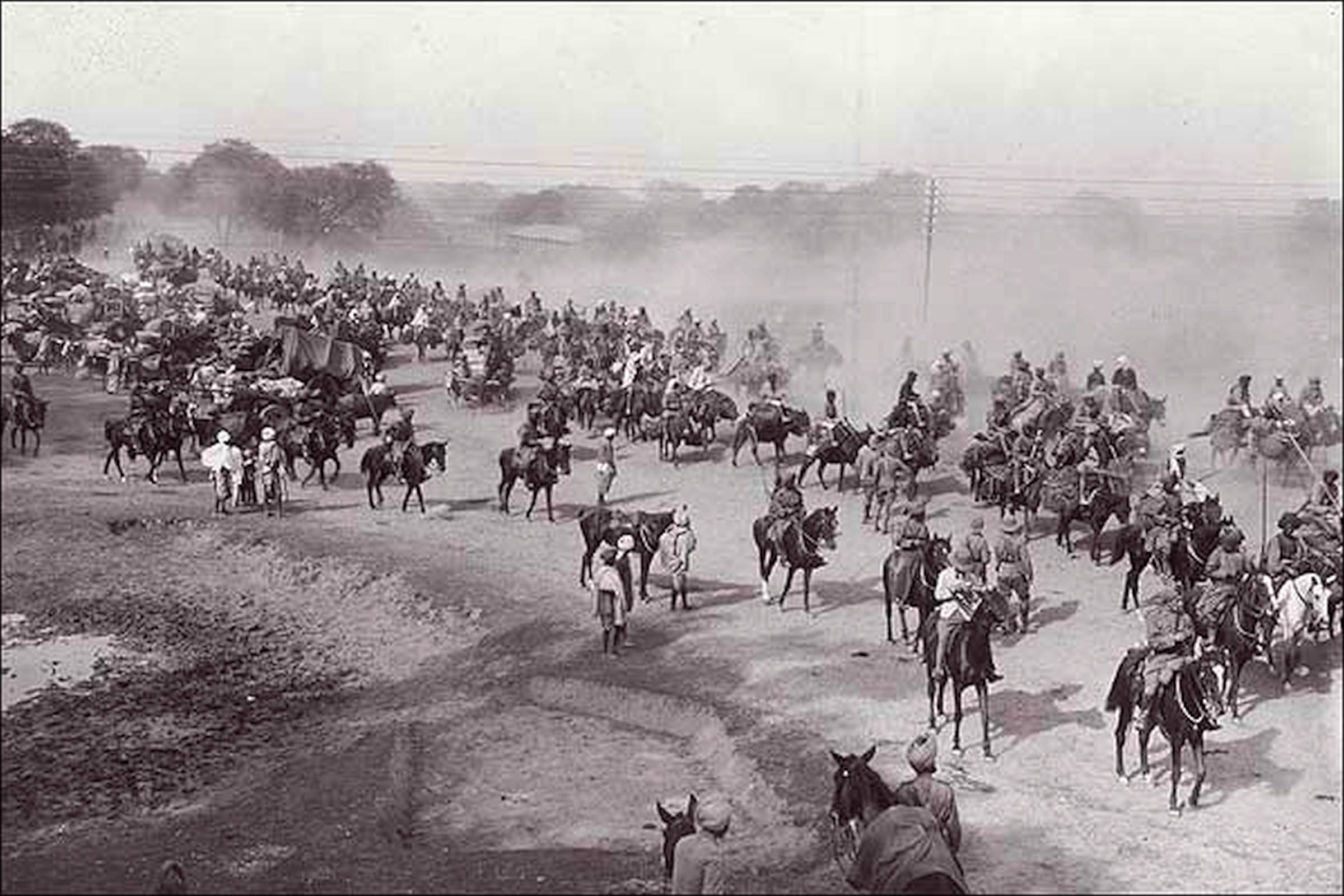
The Grand Trunk Road, at Ambala Cantonment, during the British Raj

===== Ambala Army Base =====
Ambala Army Cantonment was established in 1843 after the British were forced to leave its Karnal Cantonment following the malaria epidemic of 1841–42, as there were (at the time) no known effective means to control malaria epidemics. The cantonment houses the '2 Corps', one of the three Strike Corps of the Indian Army.

===== Ambala Air Force Base =====
Ambala Air Force Base is one of the oldest and largest airbases inherited by the Indian Air Force from the British. It was from this airbase that Spitfires and Harvards flown by instructors of the Advanced Flying Training School took part in the Indo-Pakistani War of 1947–1948. Subsequently, Ambala was the front line airfield for many years. This base was home to various aircraft that were inducted into the Indian Air Force like Harvards, Vampires, Ouragans, Hunters, Liberators, Spitfires, Canberra, and MiG-21. The airbase was briefly attacked in 1965 by B-57 bombers of the Pakistan Air Force. Today, the airbase houses the '7 Wing', with 2 squadrons of Jaguars and 1 squadron of Dassault Rafale.

===== European Cemetery =====
Ambala Cantonment is the location of the historic European Cemetery. It is 200 kilometres (120 mi) north of Delhi and 55 kilometres (34 mi) southwest of Chandigarh.

===== 1857 War Memorial =====
The First War of Independence Memorial, Ambala, also known as the 1857 War Memorial, Ambala or Shaheed Smarak Ambala, is a monument honouring the Indian rebels of 1857 First War of Independence against British colonial Company Raj in India, and spread over 22 acres (8.9 ha) on NH-44 2 kilometres (1.2 mi) southeast of Ambala Cantonment Junction railway station. The memorial has four sections: an administrative building, a museum building, a library and food court, and an open-air theatre. The complex has a 63 metres (207 ft) tall lotus-shaped memorial tower at the centre. The museum showcases the First War of Indian Independence in 1857 in 22 galleries across three sections: the outbreak of war at Ambala, the expansion of war in Haryana, and the martyrs across the country. Short films and light-and-sound shows are displayed on five screens to elaborate the valour of martyrs and the circumstances of the revolution. Before the war, 50 to 60 major movements across India had taken place against the British colonial rule in India.

The war started at Ambala on 10 May 1857, 9 hours before the revolt also began at Meerut, by the Indian sepoys of 5th & 60th regiments of Bengal Native Infantry stationed at Ambala Cantonment. This is evident by the 10 May 1857 telegram to the Chief Commissioner Punjab, John Lawrence, by the Deputy Commissioner of Ambala which states "This morning, the 60th and 5th regiments were in an excited state and under arms on their parade ground. Cavalry and artillery ordered out, but no actual row. The guard over one treasury turned out under arms and were in an excited state. I ordered the police corps to be in readiness and in their own lines. I have consulted with the General, who has sent an officer of the 5th to the treasury guard to dismiss the men to their lines, if necessary. The General will not give any orders without your sanction. This step will not, I think, be necessary unless some further disturbance takes place."

The Ambala rebellion was led by Ananti Mishra, Parmeshwar Pandey, Beni Prasad, Sheikh Faiz Ul-Khan, and Bikhan Khan, who moved towards Red Fort in Delhi via Bilaspur, Sadhaura, Yamunanagar, and Saharanpur. War spread to Ambala, Hisar, Kaithal, Karnal, Gulha Cheeka, Rohtak, Kharkhoda, Rohtak, Jhajjar, Palwal, Sohna, Rewari, and Narnaul.

The Indian revolutionaries were defeated by the British colonisers. After the war was over, the execution of Baba Mohar Singh on 5 June 1857 at Ambala Cantonment was the first recorded execution of a captured Indian rebel by the British colonial regime. The British killed 26 people, who started the revolt at Ambala, by hanging them on trees, including Sardar Mohar Singh, Kahan Singh, and Ramprasad Bairagi. British authorities burnt the villages of Bilaspur and Sadhaura as punishment for providing aid to the rebels. The 5th & 60th Regiments of the Bengal Native Infantry were also disbanded. For their participation in first war of independence, the Chaudharys and Lambardars of villages who participated in the rebellion were also deprived of their land and property, including 368 people of Hisar and Gurugram who were hanged or transported for life, and a fine was imposed on the people of Thanesar (Rs 235,000), Ambala (Rs. 253,541) and Rohtak (Rs. 63,000 mostly on Ranghars, Shaikhs and Muslim Kasai). The museum commemorates the valour and sacrifice of the Indian martyrs and the brutality of British colonial rulers.

==== Science Centre Museum ====
Aryabhatta Vigyan Kendra, a sub-regional science centre and museum on 5 acres costing Rs 40 crore, is located adjacent to the 1857 War Memorial. It houses multiple exhibits across 4 floors with 3D auditorium & planetarium, space science gallery with Indian space technology and satellites, digital adventure gallery for modern science and technology, agricultural technology, popular science, astronomical observatory with telescope for evening sky watching.

==== Formation of Ambala district ====
Ambala was given the status of a district in 1847, formed by the merging of the jagir estates of independent chieftains whose territories had lapsed or had been confiscated by the British Indian Government. In its 160 years of existence as a district, Ambala has witnessed many changes in its boundaries. Previously, it extended across tehsils of Ambala, Chandigarh, Jagadhri, Pipli, Kharar, Ropar, and Nalagarh. Kalka-cum-Kurari State, Pinjore, Mani Majra, Kasauli, and Sanawar were also merged later into the district at different times.

=== Post-independence ===
==== Hanging of Nathuram Godse ====
In November 1949, Mahatma Gandhi's alleged assassin Nathuram Godse was hanged at Ambala Central Jail along with Narayan Apte, a co-conspirator.

== Geography ==
=== Climate ===
Ambala has a humid subtropical climate (Koppen: Cwa), with a monsoon season that is considerably wetter, hotter, and more humid than the mild, dry winter.

Climate data for Ambala (1991–2020, extremes 1901–2012)
Month	Jan	Feb	Mar	Apr	May	Jun	Jul	Aug	Sep	Oct	Nov	Dec	Year
Record high °C (°F)	29.1 (84.4)	33.9 (93.0)	41.7 (107.1)	45.0 (113.0)	47.8 (118.0)	47.8 (118.0)	46.7 (116.1)	43.9 (111.0)	40.6 (105.1)	39.4 (102.9)	35.6 (96.1)	29.4 (84.9)	47.8 (118.0)
Mean daily maximum °C (°F)	18.1 (64.6)	22.5 (72.5)	27.7 (81.9)	35.1 (95.2)	38.4 (101.1)	37.9 (100.2)	34.5 (94.1)	33.5 (92.3)	33.1 (91.6)	31.7 (89.1)	26.9 (80.4)	21.0 (69.8)	30.0 (86.0)
Daily mean °C (°F)	12.4 (54.3)	16.1 (61.0)	21.0 (69.8)	27.4 (81.3)	31.1 (88.0)	31.7 (89.1)	30.1 (86.2)	29.3 (84.7)	28.2 (82.8)	24.8 (76.6)	19.4 (66.9)	14.3 (57.7)	23.8 (74.8)
Mean daily minimum °C (°F)	6.7 (44.1)	9.6 (49.3)	14.3 (57.7)	19.6 (67.3)	23.8 (74.8)	25.5 (77.9)	25.7 (78.3)	25.1 (77.2)	23.3 (73.9)	17.8 (64.0)	11.8 (53.2)	7.5 (45.5)	17.5 (63.5)
Record low °C (°F)	−1.3 (29.7)	−0.6 (30.9)	3.7 (38.7)	9.4 (48.9)	13.9 (57.0)	17.8 (64.0)	19.4 (66.9)	20.0 (68.0)	15.6 (60.1)	8.3 (46.9)	1.8 (35.2)	−0.6 (30.9)	−1.3 (29.7)
Average rainfall mm (inches)	30.7 (1.21)	35.9 (1.41)	29.4 (1.16)	20.1 (0.79)	35.3 (1.39)	111.4 (4.39)	257.0 (10.12)	228.0 (8.98)	136.5 (5.37)	14.3 (0.56)	6.5 (0.26)	15.4 (0.61)	920.5 (36.24)
Average rainy days	2.0	2.4	2.0	1.7	3.0	5.5	8.7	8.9	5.5	0.8	0.4	0.8	41.7
Average relative humidity (%) (at 17:30 IST)	66	55	45	29	30	44	68	72	66	52	53	63	53
Source: India Meteorological Department

== Administration ==
The Ambala city was originally constituted as a municipality in 1867. The separate city councils of Ambala City and Ambala Sadar were merged into the Ambala Municipal Corporation in March 2010 in which 9 wards were allotted to Ambala Sadar and 11 to Ambala City. The First election to the erstwhile Municipal Corporation was held in June 2013. Almost five years later, on February 17, 2018, the Haryana Government decided to abolish Ambala Municipal Corporation again splitting it into two municipal councils—Ambala City and Ambala Sadar, citing reasons of economic problems since in every financial year the expenditures had hugely surpassed the income. Ambala Sadar is around 10–12 km from the main municipal corporation headquarters in Ambala city. Since the city had not only the commissioner's office but also other civic offices, residents were forced to travel a long distance to get to the main municipal corporation office. The Ambala City Council was then upgraded into the present Ambala City Municipal Corporation in 2021.

The present Ambala City Municipal Corporation was formed on January 14, 2021, when Deepti Umashankar, the then Divisional Commissioner of Ambala, administered the oath of office and allegiance to Shakti Rani Sharma, the first directly elected Mayor of Ambala Municipal Corporation, and the Municipal Corporation members elected from all 20 wards of the corporation. It administers a total area of 67.56 km^{2}. An annual budget of the municipal corporation worth ₹162 crore was passed for the financial year 2024–25.

== Demographics ==
Religion in Ambala city
Religion	Percent
Hinduism	81.94%
Sikhism	14.59%
Jainism	1.44%
Islam	1.25%
Others	0.78%

As of 2011 India census, Ambala, UA had a population of 207,934, consisting of 112,840 males and 95,094 females, a ratio of 843. There were 20,687 children ages 0–6, and Ambala had an average literacy rate of 89.31%, with 91.76% of males and 86.41% of females literate.

Religious groups in Ambala City (1868−2011) (Note: 1868-1941: Data for the entirety of the town of Ambala, which included Ambala Municipality, Ambala Civil Lines, Sadar Bazar Ambala Municipality, and Ambala Cantonment.)
Religious group	1868		1881		1891		1901		1911		1921		1931		1941		2011	
Religious group	Pop.	%	Pop.	%	Pop.	%	Pop.	%	Pop.	%	Pop.	%	Pop.	%	Pop.	%	Pop.	%
Hinduism	27,008	53.27%	34,522	51.17%	40,339	50.87%	39,601	50.36%	38,192	47.66%	37,765	49.48%	39,945 (Note: 1931-1941: Including Ad-Dharmis)	46.13%	50,679	47.19%	159,912	81.94%
Islam	19,570	38.6%	27,115	40.19%	30,523	38.49%	32,149	40.88%	31,641	39.49%	31,448	41.2%	38,089	43.99%	47,881	44.59%	2,431	1.25%
Christianity	1,362	2.69%	—N/a	—N/a	4,899	6.18%	3,610	4.59%	5,918	7.39%	2,373	3.11%	3,138	3.62%	1,054	0.98%	739	0.38%
Sikhism	1,235	2.44%	1,867	2.77%	2,407	3.04%	2,168	2.76%	3,392	4.23%	3,622	4.75%	4,143	4.78%	4,926	4.59%	28,471	14.59%
Jainism	—N/a	—N/a	410	0.61%	1,119	1.41%	1,096	1.39%	957	1.19%	1,083	1.42%	1,269	1.47%	1,814	1.69%	2,816	1.44%
Zoroastrianism	—N/a	—N/a	—N/a	—N/a	6	0.01%	14	0.02%	31	0.04%	30	0.04%	2	0%	—N/a	—N/a	—N/a	—N/a
Buddhism	—N/a	—N/a	—N/a	—N/a	0	0%	0	0%	0	0%	5	0.01%	5	0.01%	—N/a	—N/a	55	0.03%
Judaism	—N/a	—N/a	—N/a	—N/a	0	0%	N/A	N/A	0	0%	0	0%	1	0%	—N/a	—N/a	—N/a	—N/a
Others	1,521	3%	3,549	5.26%	1	0%	0	0%	0	0%	0	0%	0	0%	1,008	0.94%	729	0.37%
Total population	50,696	100%	67,463	100%	79,294	100%	78,638	100%	80,131	100%	76,326	100%	86,592	100%	107,383	100%	195,153	100%

== Economy ==
Ambala's economy combines established manufacturing with growing logistics activity. The city is known as the 'City of Scientific Instruments', hosting a major scientific and surgical instruments industry alongside metal casting, kitchen appliance manufacturing, and submersible pump production. It also serves as a trading centre for cotton, sugar, and grain, with local handicrafts including bamboo furniture-making and cloth-weaving. The nearby Ambala-Rajpura industrial cluster has emerged as a warehousing and logistics hub, benefiting from its central location near several Tier II cities and rising demand from e-commerce, retail, and FMCG firms, supported by national infrastructure initiatives such as the PM Gati Shakti scheme. The cluster's location is central to its appea as it sits within one to three hours of major Tier II hubs such as Ludhiana, Jalandhar, Ambala, Amritsar, Shimla, the Chandigarh tricity area, and Dehradun, giving it easy reach into Punjab, Haryana, and Himachal Pradesh, and it is also closer to Uttarakhand than Delhi NCR is.

IT companies in Ambala include Soft Web Stock, KWS Infotech, IB Solutions India, GHS Infotech, Creative Software Solution, and Designing Mart. Finance companies operating in the city include Bajaj Finserv Lending, Tata Motors Finance Limited, Shriram City Union Finance Ltd, Mahindra & Mahindra Financial Services Ltd, and Manappuram Finance Ltd. Among engineering firms are Premium Engineers, Zuko Engineers, Sant Engineering Company, Ashoka Machinery Fabrics (India), and Engineers Consortium. The infrastructure and construction sector features a large number of firms, including Sood Construction Company, Aggarwal Construction Company, Shanti Construction, Singla Builder, Mangal Construction Company, Onkar Builder, Ambience, A. K. Construction Company, Anil Constructions Company, Soma Isolux NH One Toll Way Pvt. Ltd., Ali Construction, K. M. Construction Company, Navreet Construction, S. M. T. Construction, V. K. Constructive Builders, Videhraj Estates Private Limited, Kochhar Land Developers Pvt. Ltd., A. N. Builder, Million Miles Group, and Hi-Tech Builders.

=== Cloth Market ===
The Cloth Market is considered to be the largest textile market in this region. The market is known for catering to wedding-related shopping. The most commonly bought items are sarees and silk clothing.

== Transport ==
Ambala is connected to all of the other major cities of north India. It is an interchange for various commuters for all neighbouring states.

National Highway NH 44, popularly known as GT road and earlier known as NH 1, passes through Ambala and connects it to the national capital (Delhi), Panipat, Ludhiana, and Amritsar. NH 152 connects Ambala to the state capital, Chandigarh, and Kaithal. Apart from the interstate service, Ambala also houses one of the oldest local bus services in Haryana, which is run by both Haryana roadways and private companies. Other means of local transportation include auto rickshaws and cycle rickshaws.

=== Roadways ===
Bus service is the major means of public transport in this district. The Ambala depot came into being on 1 August 1950. The office of the General Manager is situated on the premises of the depot workshop at Ambala City. Ambala depot has a sub-depot at Naraingarh.

Presently, Haryana Roadways, Ambala has 200 buses, which carry about 34.88 lakh passengers daily and cover a distance of about 19000 km daily. Out of these, the total distance covered on interstate routes is 24,711 km (15,355 mi) and 41.469 km (25.768 mi) are operated within Haryana every day.

The new bus stand at Ambala Cantt was inaugurated on 12 July 1999, and the total land of the bus stand is 6.7 acres (2.7 ha). Bus stands in this district exist at Ambala City, Naraingarh, and Barara as well. A sub-depot level workshop has also been provided at Naraingarh. 'Yatri Niwas' exists on the campus of the Ambala Cantt bus stand for the convenience of commuters who wish to stay for the night.

Besides the Haryana Roadways buses, the government has issued permits to private operators on local routes. Presently, 60 buses are plying in Ambala district. The bus stand is very near to Ambala Cantt Jn. (railway station). Most of the buses plying on GT road (NH1) stop in front of the railway station.

=== Railways ===
Ambala is a divisional headquarters of the Northern Railway Zone and is an important railway junction. Ambala Cantt station is among the top 100 booking stations in India. Several railway stations serve the city:

- Ambala Cantt [UMB] – Major junction on the Delhi–Kalka, Moradabad–Ambala, Ambala–Attari, Ambala–Bathinda and Ambala–Una Himachal lines.
- Ambala City [UBC] – Station on the Ambala–Attari line.
- Barara [RAA] – Station on the Ambala–Saharanpur line.
- Dhulkot [DKT] – Station on the Delhi–Kalka line.
- Dukheri [DOKY] – Station on the Ambala–Saharanpur line.
- Kesri [KES] – Station on the Ambala–Saharanpur line.
- Mohri [MOY] – Station on the Delhi–Kalka line.
- Tandwal [TDW] – Station on the Ambala–Saharanpur line.

The Ambala Cantonment railway station was founded on the junction of the Delhi-Kalka and Ludhiana-Saharanpur lines. The historic Delhi-Panipat-Ambala-Kalka railway line dates back to 1889, while the Ludhiana-Saharanpur line was built in 1870. Situated 200 km (120 mi) north of Delhi, the city is well connected by the rail and road network.

Ambala Cantt railway station is the main station of the city and well-connected with the major cities of India. Kalka-Shimla Railway, which is a UNESCO World Heritage site, also comes under Ambala division.

Ambala Cantonment railway station serves maximum Shatabdi Express after New Delhi. Ambala railway station was mentioned in the famous story 'The Woman on Platform 8' by Ruskin Bond, although in reality, there is no platform 8 in Ambala Cantt.

=== Airways ===
Air transport in Ambala is presently served by Shaheed Bhagat Singh International Airport located about 45 km north of the city, which is the nearest major airport to the city and provides domestic and limited international connectivity.

Ambala Domestic Airport has also been developed at Ambala Cantonment through a civil enclave at the Ambala Air Force Station under the Government of India's UDAN regional connectivity scheme. The airport infrastructure and terminal building have been completed and the airport is awaiting inauguration and commencement of commercial flight operations.

== Education ==
Ambala has a large number of schools and colleges. Notable colleges are as follows:

- Convent of Jesus and Mary, Ambala
- D.A.V. College (Lahore), Ambala City
- E-Max School of Engineering and Applied Research
- Government Polytechnic College, Ambala
- Maharishi Markandeshwar University, Mullana
- Maharishi Markandeshwar University, Sadopur
- Philadelphia Hospital & School of Nursing, Ambala
- Sanatan Dharma College (S.D. College)

== Notable people ==
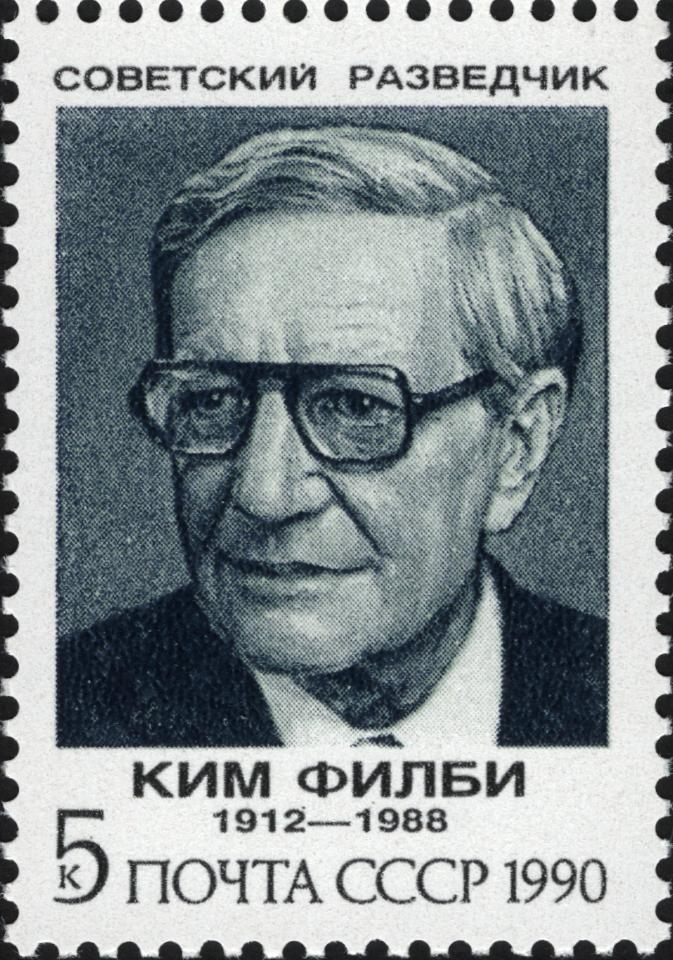
A 1990 Soviet postage stamp of Kim Philby, a British MI6 officer and double agent for the Soviet Union, born in Ambala, British India.

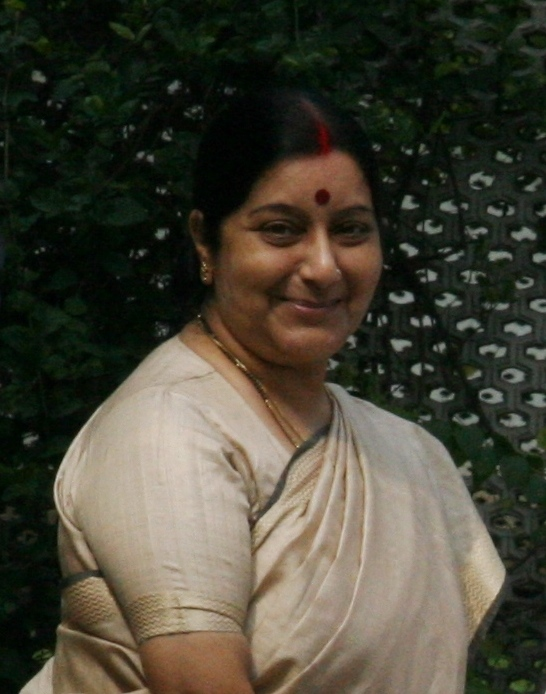
Sushma Swaraj

- Zohrabai Ambalewali
- Hansraj Behl
- Urvashi Butalia
- Simi Chahal
- Juhi Chawla
- Parineeti Chopra
- Swadesh Deepak
- Navneet Kaur Dhillon
- Sanjeev Kapoor
- Manpreet Kaur
- Nasir Kazmi
- Sucheta Kripalani
- Shalabh Kumar
- Selja Kumari
- Talib Dehlavi
- Kim Philby
- Ash K. Prakash
- Om Puri
- Saghar Siddiqui
- Sanjiv Sam Gambhir
- Sushma Swaraj
- Zeba
