= Ambala Cantonment =

- City
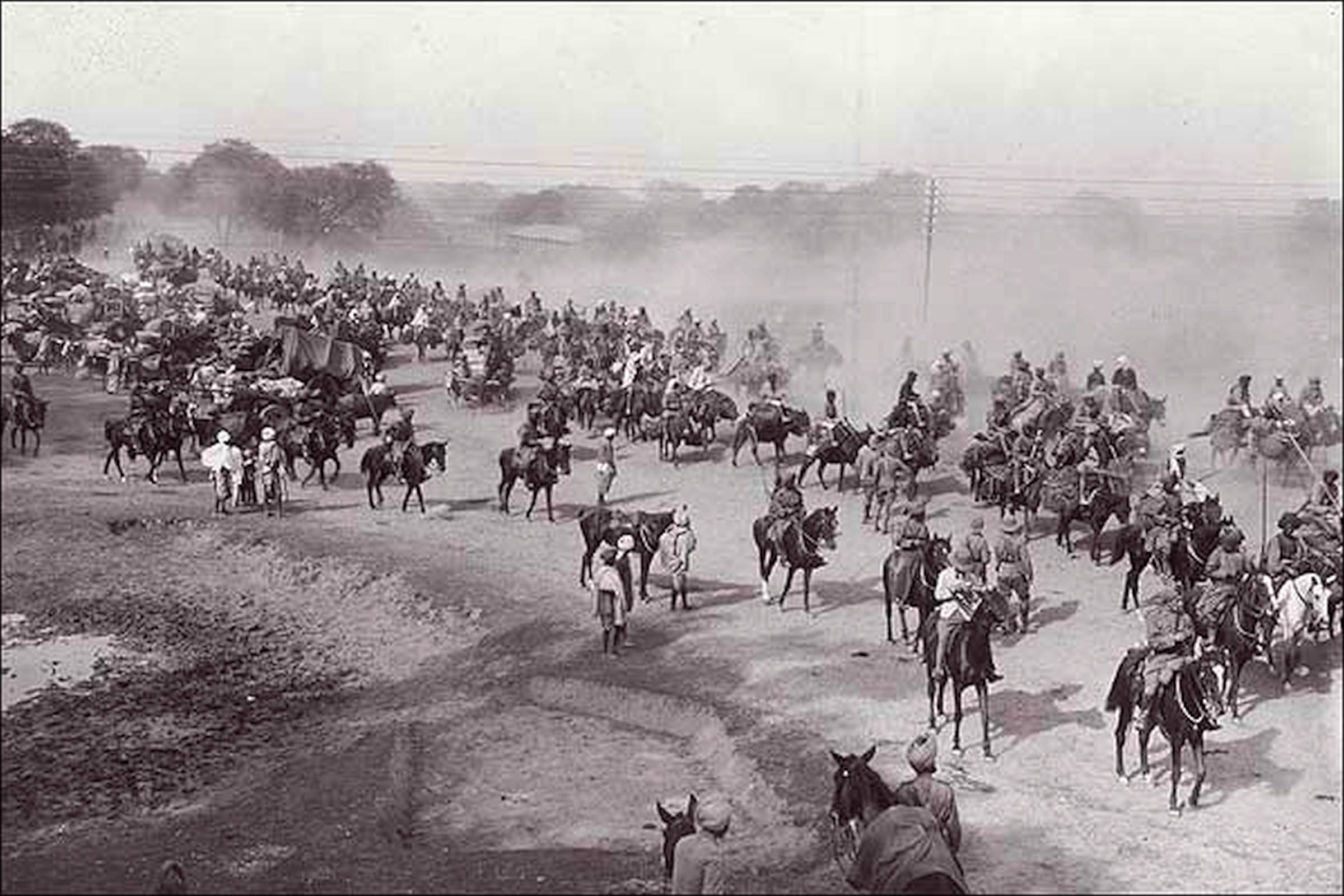
- Grand Trunk Road, at Ambala Cantonment, during British Raj
- Nickname: Science City
- Location in Haryana, India Ambala Cantonment (India)
- Coordinates: 30.361915°N 76.8480778°E
- Country: India
- State: Haryana
- District: Ambala
- Established: 1843(cantonment)

Government
  - Body: Cantonment Board Ambala

Population (2011)
  - Total: 55,370

Languages
  - Official: Hindi
  - Additional official: English, Punjabi
- Time zone: UTC+5:30 (IST)
- Postal code: 1330XX
- Vehicle registration: HR 01, HR 85, HR 37
- Website: haryana.gov.in

Ambala Cantonment is a cantonment town in Ambala district in the state of Haryana, India. It is 200 km north of Delhi and 55 km southwest of Chandigarh. This cantonment was established in the year 1843 and is an important centre for manufacturing of scientific and surgical instruments.

== Demographics ==
Religions in Ambala Cantonment, 2011 Census data
Religion	Percent
Hinduism	91.77%
Sikhism	4.48%
Islam	2.21%
Christianity	1.26%
Others	0.28%

As of 2011 India census, Ambala Cantonment had a population of 55,370. Males constitute 61% of the population and females 39%. Ambala Cantonment has an average literacy rate of 91.24%, higher than the national average of 74%; with 95.07% of the males and 85.32% of females literate. 11.41% of the population is under 6 years of age.

== Economy ==
Scientific and surgical instruments are manufactured in Ambala Cantonment.

== Transport ==
=== Railways ===
Ambala Cantonment Junction railway station is a major junction. Delhi-Kalka and Saharanpur-Ludhiana's railway lines pass through this junction

=== By road ===
G.T. Road passes through Ambala Cantonment.

== Places of interest ==
- European Cemetery

== Education ==
Historic Colleges which were established before independence of India are also present. An example of that is Sanatan Dharma College on Ambala–Jagadhri Highway. Convent of Jesus and Mary is a girls' day-school in Ambala Cantonment.

== Gallery ==
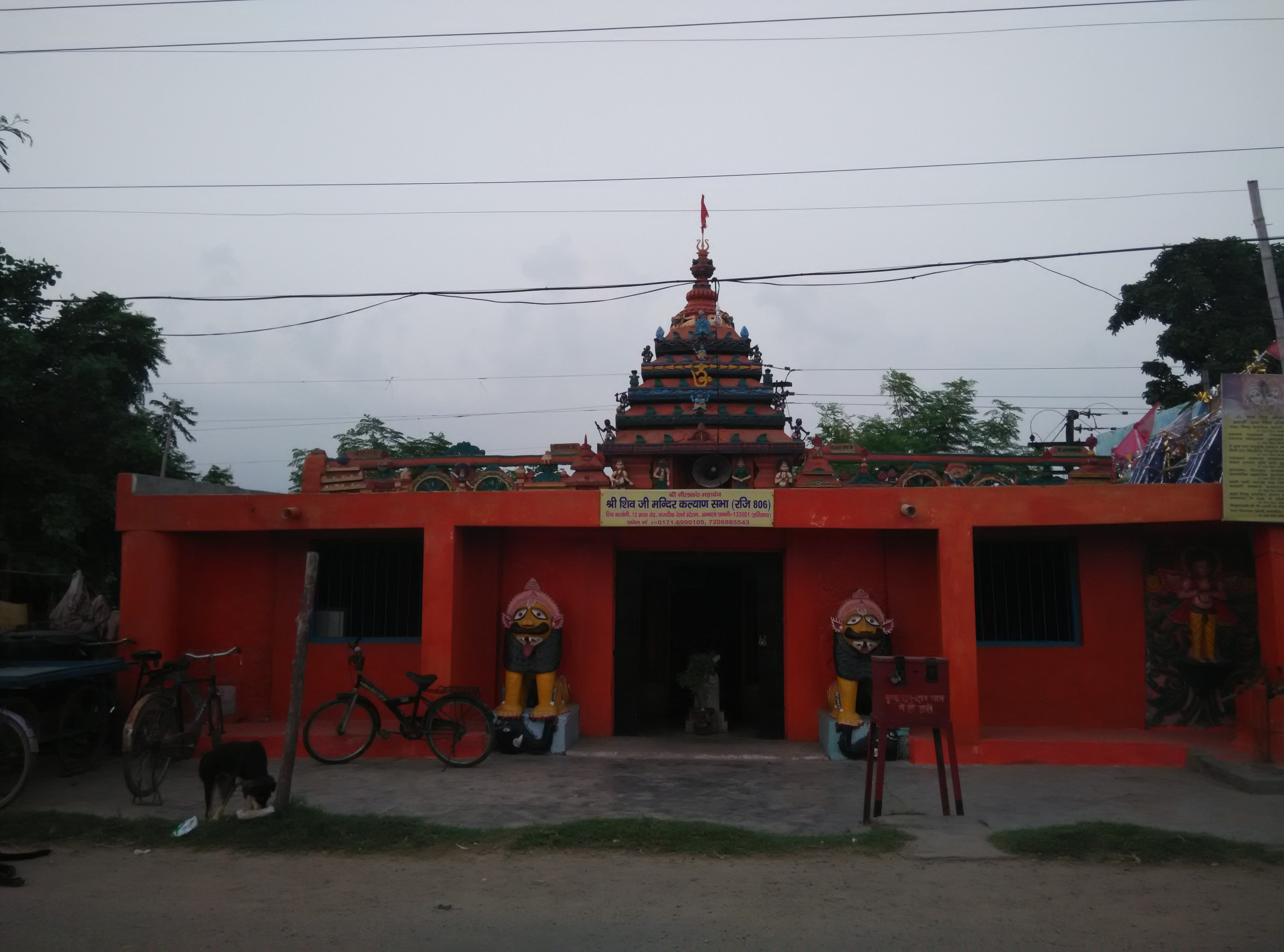
Ambala Cantonment Temple.

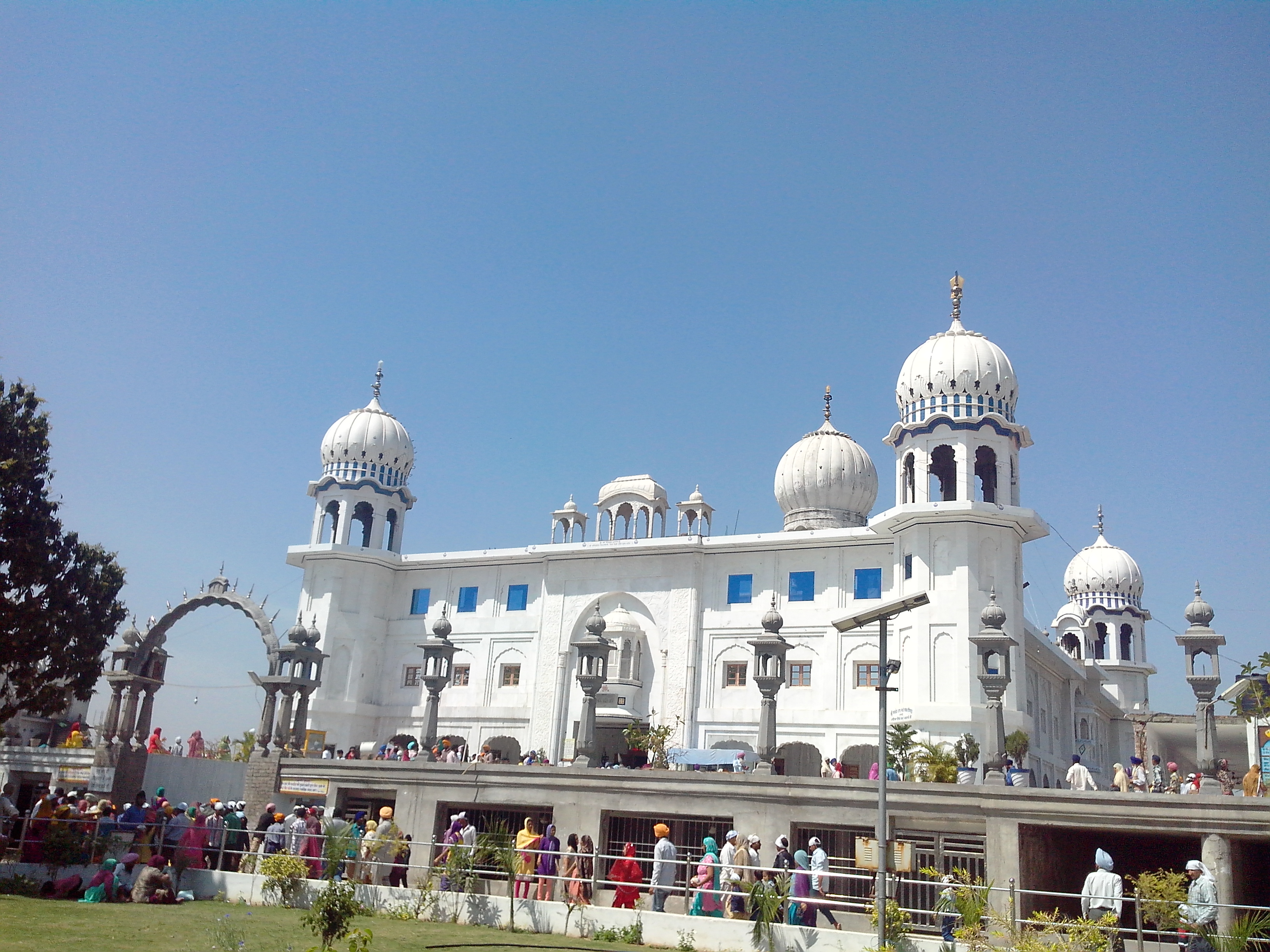
Panjokhra sahib.

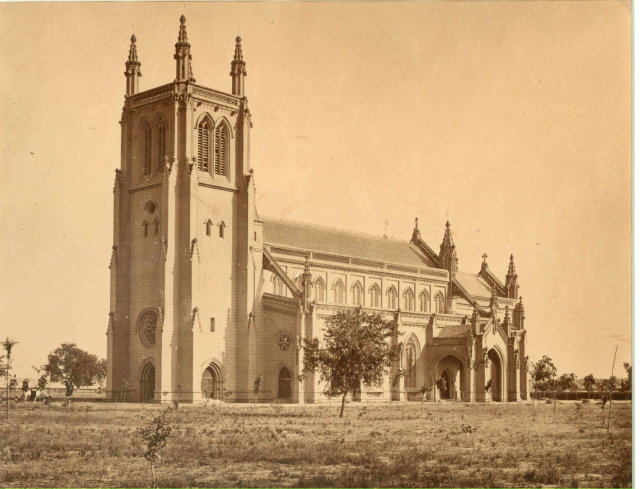
St Paul's Church before being bombed by the Pakistani Air Force in the 1965 conflict.

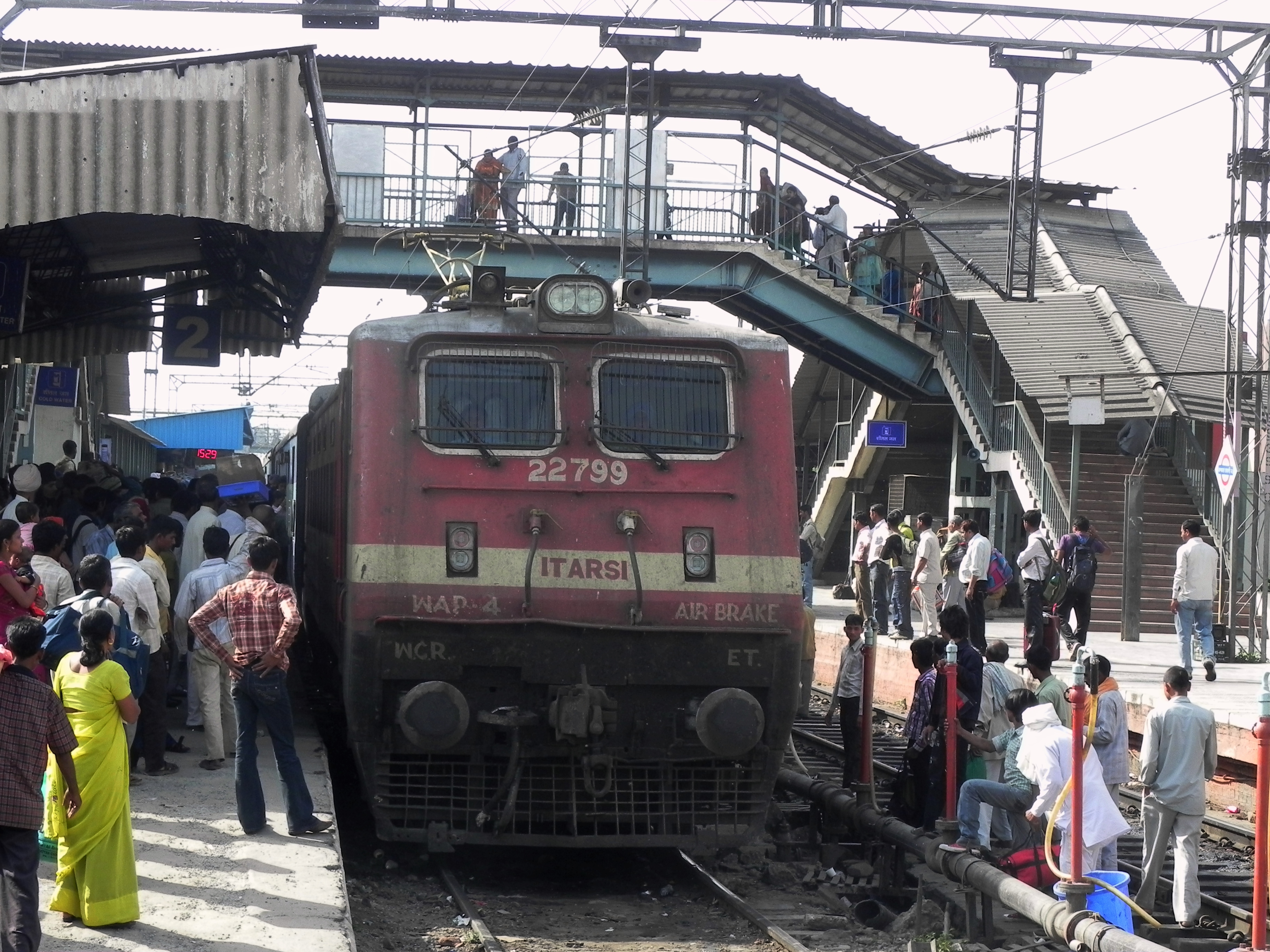
Ambala Cantonment railway station.
