= International reactions to the Malaysia Airlines Flight 17 shootdown =

The shooting down of Malaysia Airlines Flight 17 on 17 July 2014 elicited reactions from numerous countries and organizations.

== Countries ==
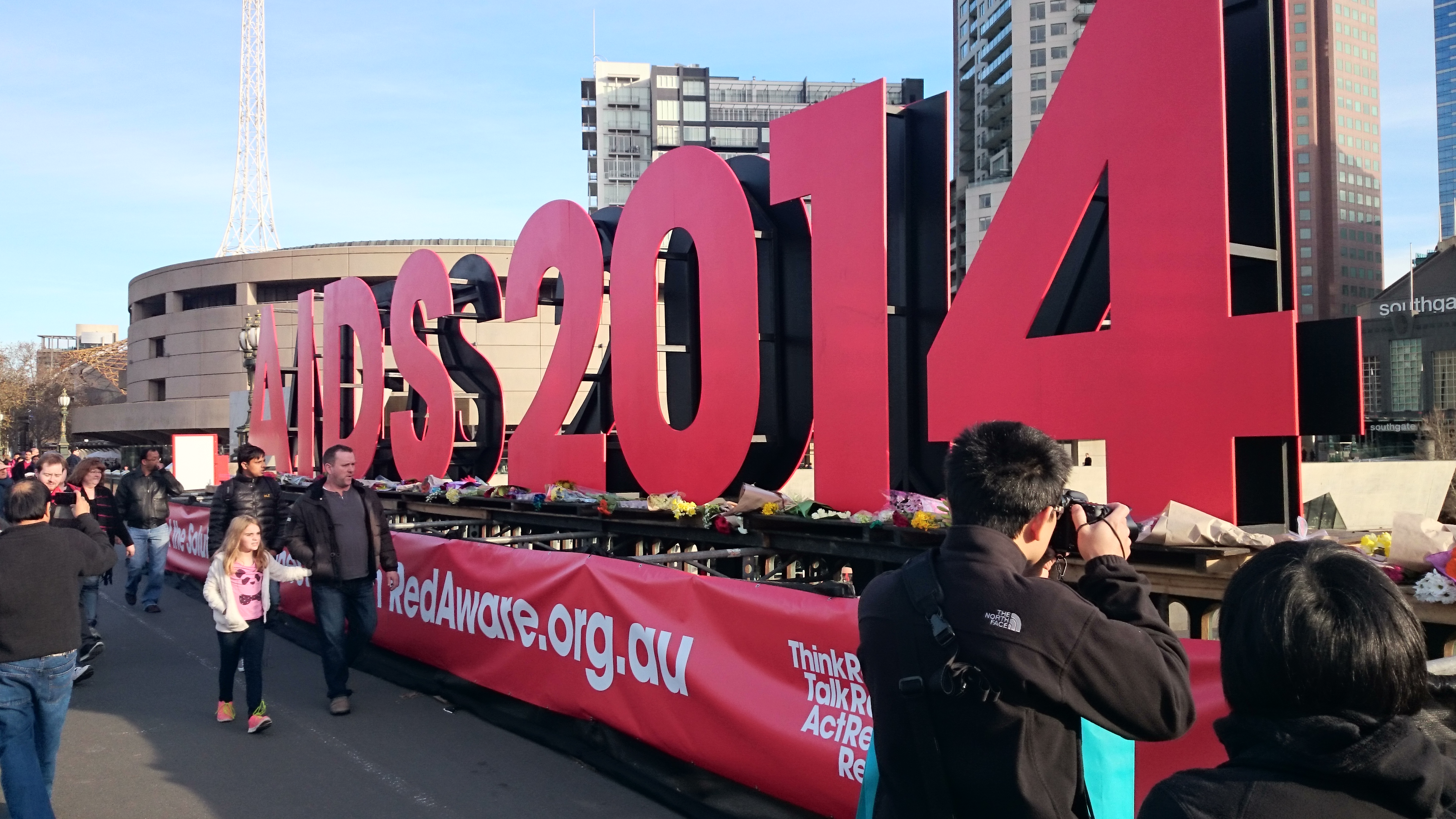
Makeshift memorial at the International AIDS Conference in Melbourne. Six delegates died in the shootdown.

Australia – In an address to Parliament, Australian Prime Minister Tony Abbott stated that the aircraft was downed by a missile, which appeared to have been launched by Russian-backed rebels. Additionally, Julie Bishop, the Australian Minister for Foreign Affairs, remarked in an interview on an Australian television program that it was "extraordinary" her Russian counterparts had refused to speak to her about the shoot-down, even after the Russian ambassador was summoned to meet with her.

The Russian government criticized Abbott's response, describing his comments as "inappropriate" and accusing him of making "an accusation of guilt based on speculation," as he was one of the first world leaders to publicly link the shoot-down to Russia. Abbott later criticized the recovery efforts, calling them "shambolic" and comparing them to "a garden clean-up rather than a forensic investigation." Meanwhile, Bishop publicly warned separatist forces against treating the victims' bodies as hostages.

The downing of the flight resulted in the deaths of 38 Australian citizens and residents. Ahead of the 2014 G20 meeting in Brisbane, Tony Abbott sought to draw attention to Russia's role in the incident. During a meeting with Russian President Vladimir Putin at the APEC summit in Beijing, Abbott reportedly informed Putin that Australia had evidence indicating the missile that destroyed the plane was of Russian origin. He suggested that Russia should consider apologizing and providing appropriate restitution to the victims. However, Russia continued to deny any involvement.

Following the release of the Dutch Safety Board report on the downing, Australian Prime Minister Malcolm Turnbull declared that Australia "will not be bullied by Russia" and emphasized that "those who committed this crime must answer for it." Regarding Russia's veto at the UN Security Council, Turnbull remarked, "[W]e [Australia] deplore the conduct of Russia using its Security Council veto in July to block the establishment of a special international criminal tribunal".

Austria – Austrian Foreign Affairs Minister Sebastian Kurz called for a thorough investigation into the cause of the tragedy and emphasized the need for "free access for the experts."

Bahrain – The Crown Prince of Bahrain, Salman bin Hamad Al-Khalifa, expressed his sincere condolences on behalf of His Majesty King Hamad and the Kingdom of Bahrain to the King, government, and people of Malaysia following the tragic crash of the aircraft. During a telephone conversation with the Malaysian Prime Minister, the Crown Prince prayed for God Almighty to protect Malaysia and other Muslim countries from such tragedies. He also conveyed his deepest sympathy to the families of the victims, praying for their souls to rest in peace and for their families to find strength and courage.

Bangladesh – Bangladeshi Prime Minister Sheikh Hasina expressed deep shock over the crash of the Malaysian passenger airliner. On behalf of her government and the people of Bangladesh, she conveyed her condolences to the Malaysian Prime Minister, stating: "We pray that Almighty Allah may grant eternal peace to the departed souls and courage and fortitude to the families of the victims to bear the loss."

Additionally, Bangladeshi Foreign Minister A.H. Mahmood Ali sent a separate message to his Malaysian counterpart. He expressed his shock over the tragedy and extended his deep condolences and heartfelt sympathy to the families of the victims.

Belarus – Belarusian President Alexander Lukashenko sent condolences to the head of state of Malaysia, the King of the Netherlands, and the Governor-General of the Commonwealth of Australia regarding the victims of the Malaysia Airlines plane crash. In a statement, he said, "On behalf of the Belarusian people, I extend sincere condolences in connection with the terrible crash of the Malaysia Airlines Boeing 777 in Ukrainian airspace."

Belgium – Belgian Prime Minister Elio Di Rupo expressed his condolences following the Malaysia Airlines flight tragedy. He stated, "On behalf of the Belgian government, I express my sincere condolences to the families and friends of the many victims of the Malaysia Airlines flight." He paid particular attention to the five Belgian victims, offering support to their families and friends.

Di Rupo also conveyed deep sympathy to the Dutch people and authorities. He emphasized the need for a thorough investigation, stating, "I want full clarity on the exact circumstances of this tragedy and for those responsible to be quickly identified and brought to justice."

Brazil – Brazilian President Dilma Rousseff stated that "the Brazilian government will remain neutral until there is clearer information about the incident." She emphasized the importance of identifying those responsible for the shoot-down.

Brunei – His Majesty Sultan Hassanal Bolkiah of Brunei sent condolence messages to the leaders of Malaysia and the Netherlands following the crash of Malaysia Airlines flight MH17 in Ukraine. In his messages, the monarch expressed deep sadness upon hearing the shocking news. He further stated that Her Majesty Queen Saleha, the government, and the people of Brunei joined him in offering condolences and sympathies to the victims' families. The Sultan also prayed that "Allah S.W.T would bestow His blessings upon the victims' souls and place them among His loved and pious ones."

Bulgaria – Bulgarian President Rosen Plevneliev sent his condolences to the King of the Netherlands and the leaders of Malaysia on behalf of the Bulgarian people, expressing sympathy for the families and relatives of the victims. The president strongly condemned any act of violence that leads to the loss of life and called for an immediate and thorough international investigation to identify the causes and those responsible for the tragedy.

Canada – Canadian Prime Minister Stephen Harper issued a statement expressing that he was "shocked and saddened" upon learning of the downing of the flight. While the cause of the crash remained unclear, he emphasized that the Government of Canada continued "to condemn Russia’s military aggression and illegal occupation of Ukraine, which is at the root of the ongoing conflict in the region."

Foreign Affairs Minister John Baird called for a "credible and unimpeded" international investigation into the crash and urged pro-Russian forces to withdraw from the crash site. Baird also placed blame for the accident on Russia and the rebels, stating, "The Kremlin may not have pulled the trigger, but it certainly loaded the gun and put it in the murderer’s hand."

Chile – The Chilean government issued its heartfelt condolences to the families of the victims and called for an investigation to be conducted with "extensive, rigorous, and transparent facts." The perpetrators must not go unpunished, and any accomplices should be brought to justice.

China – General Secretary of the Chinese Communist Party Xi Jinping sent condolences to the King of Malaysia and the King of the Netherlands over the loss of lives in the downed aircraft, adding that he called for an independent and fair investigation into the tragedy. Chinese Foreign Ministry spokesman Qin Gang also offered his deep condolences to all the victims.

Colombia – Colombian President Juan Manuel Santos issued a statement, saying he had instructed the embassy to the United Nations to "support any actions aimed at establishing the truth and identifying those responsible for this atrocious crime in Ukraine."

Colombia's Ministry of Foreign Affairs also issued a press release expressing condolences to the friends and families of the 298 victims of the downing of the Malaysia Airlines aircraft. The press release concluded with the Ministry stating, "We (Colombia) join the international community in demanding that the parties involved in Ukraine allow a transparent, credible, and urgent investigation to be conducted as quickly as possible."

Costa Rica – Costa Rica, through its Ministry of Foreign Affairs, condemned the attack.

Cuba – Former First Secretary of the Communist Party of Cuba Fidel Castro blamed the government of Ukraine for the downing of the Malaysian airplane.

Cyprus – Cypriot President Nicos Anastasiades signed the book of condolences at the Dutch Embassy in Nicosia and expressed sympathy to the government and people of the Netherlands. Earlier, the Cypriot Ministry of Foreign Affairs called for an immediate investigation and extended condolences to the families of the victims. The Ministry also conveyed sympathy to the Prime Ministers of the Netherlands and Malaysia, as well as to the governments of all other nations whose citizens senselessly lost their lives in the tragic incident.

Czech Republic – Czech Foreign Minister Lubomír Zaorálek, during a meeting at the Council of the European Union for Foreign Affairs, expressed his deep condolences to the families of the victims and the governments of the involved countries. He added, "Separatists must ensure unrestricted and safe access to the crash site, enabling an examination of the accident and ensuring humane treatment and repatriation of the victims. Those who committed this crime will be held accountable. We demand dignified treatment of the victims' remains and permanent access for international disaster experts to conduct a proper independent investigation."

Denmark – Danish Prime Minister Helle Thorning-Schmidt called for a "thorough and independent" inquiry into the incident and urged the international community to reach an agreement on how to hold the responsible parties accountable. In a statement, she said, "We completely support calls for a thorough and independent investigation to be carried out soon into the circumstances that led to this tragic incident. We also need the international community to discuss what consequences should follow and how to hold those responsible accountable."

East Timor – President Taur Matan Ruak expressed being "shocked" over the tragedy and offered condolences to the Malaysian government, particularly to the bereaved families and the countries of the nationalities involved.

Ecuador – Ecuador, through its Ministry of Foreign Affairs and Human Mobility, expressed its "deep regret" over the downing of the flight and extended "solidarity with the families of the victims." The Foreign Ministry of Ecuador also strongly condemned the action and supported a thorough investigation.

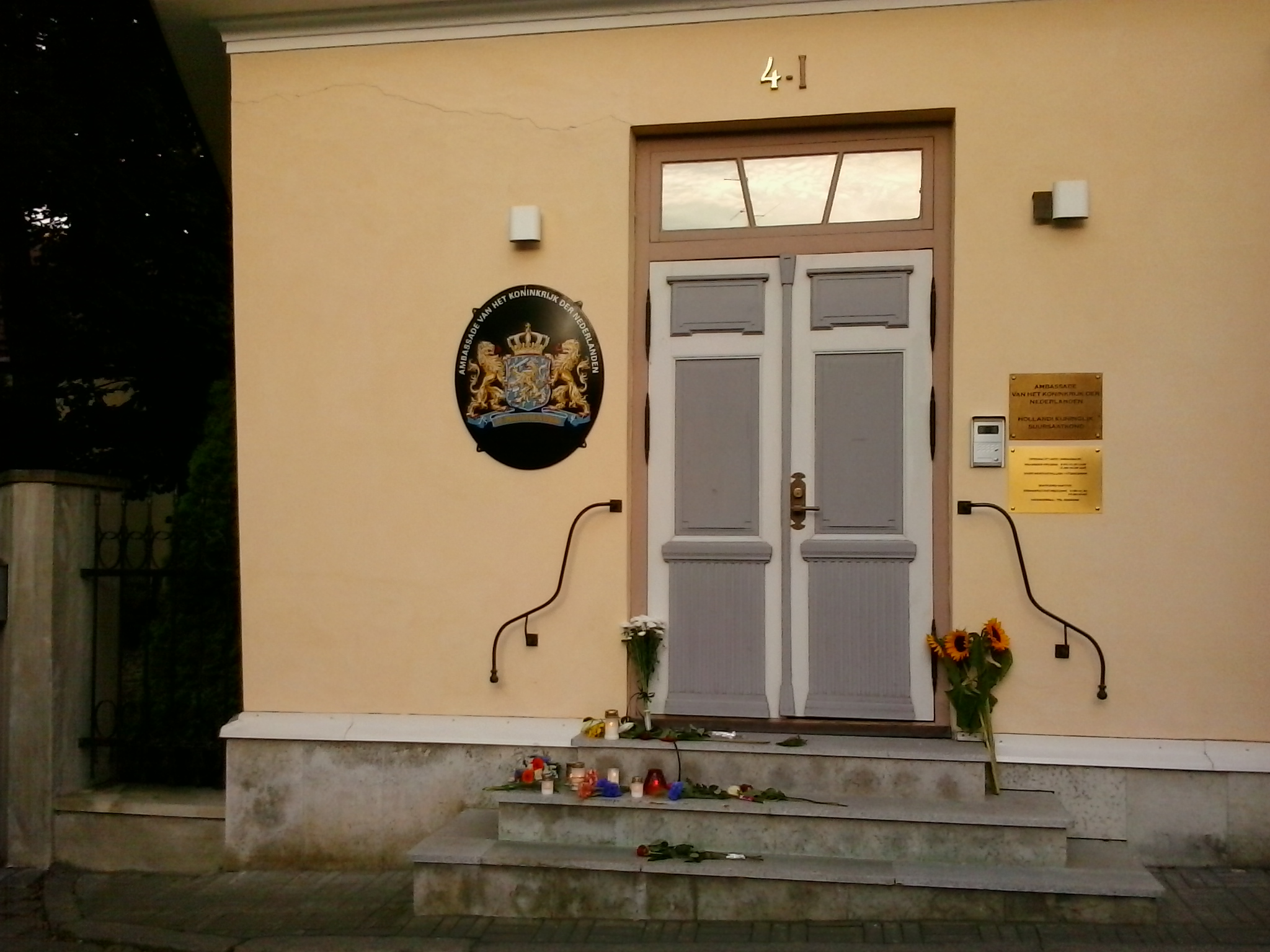
Flowers and candles at the Netherlands Embassy in Tallinn, Estonia

Estonia – Estonian Prime Minister Taavi Rõivas, in his statement, said, "We are going to tighten sanctions against Russia. It is our moral obligation to the victims of MH17." Estonian Foreign Minister Urmas Paet also stated that his country is ready to participate in the MH17 investigation.

Fiji – Fiji's interim Prime Minister Frank Bainimarama sent his condolences to Australia over the loss of lives in the Malaysia Airlines crash.

Finland – Finnish President Sauli Niinistö and Prime Minister Alexander Stubb offered their condolences to those affected by the loss of life aboard the flight. Niinistö expressed his deepest condolences on his own behalf and on behalf of the people of Finland to the families and loved ones of the victims. A written message was sent to the Malaysian Prime Minister and the King of the Netherlands.

Stubb called for all parties to immediately launch a thorough and independent investigation into the events in eastern Ukraine. Niinistö also spoke with Vladimir Putin by telephone to ensure that Russia fully cooperates in probing the shooting down of the flight. He told Putin that the plane's fate must be determined by an impartial, independent international investigation, and that blocking or endangering this would be reprehensible.

Following the crash of flight MH17, Finnair crew aboard flight 915 decided to speak about their own near-shootdown incident by the Soviet Union, which occurred during the Cold War.

France – French President François Hollande offered "all of his solidarity" to the relatives of the crash victims and called for a wide-ranging investigation to determine the cause of the tragedy.

Georgia – The Georgian Foreign Ministry expressed its deep sadness over the crash and demanded an investigation into the causes that led to the tragedy. The Ministry conveyed its sincere condolences to the governments and people of the Netherlands, Malaysia, and all the countries whose citizens were on board the aircraft, and expressed its solidarity with the families of the victims. It added, "At this stage, it can be unequivocally stated that the crash is a disastrous consequence of the armed conflict in Ukraine, which breaches national and international law, as well as the country's sovereignty and territorial integrity."

Germany – German Chancellor Angela Merkel called for an immediate ceasefire in Ukraine to allow a probe into the apparent downing of a passenger plane in the rebel-held eastern part of the country and for a swift, independent inquiry. Merkel stated that Russia, in particular, must do its part to end the conflict, adding that Moscow bore responsibility.

The Chancellor also telephoned Malaysian Prime Minister Najib Razak to express her condolences over the tragedy and said that Germany was prepared to assist Malaysia.

Greece – Greek Deputy Prime Minister and Foreign Minister Evangelos Venizelos expressed deep condolences over the air tragedy, stating, "The loss of so many lives causes deep sorrow. We express our condolences to the families of the victims and expect an independent international investigation that will fully clarify the causes of the tragedy."

In light of information suggesting that the plane was allegedly shot down, the Greek leader reiterated a plea "for the peaceful resolution of the crisis in eastern Ukraine to avoid acts that could lead to an increase in tension."

Guatemala – The Government of Guatemala expressed its condolences to the families of the victims and the governments of the various nationalities of the deceased passengers. The Guatemalan Ministry of Foreign Affairs has urged the relevant authorities to conduct an investigation.

Holy See – Pope Francis has pledged his prayers for the victims of Malaysia Airlines flight MH17. In a statement, the Vatican said the Pontiff had learned "with dismay" of the tragedy involving the airplane downed in eastern Ukraine and stated that the Pope would pray for the numerous victims of the incident and their relatives.

Hungary – Prime Minister Viktor Orbán said in a radio interview that the "unusual, rare, and shocking" downing of the Malaysian passenger jet over eastern Ukraine requires a thorough investigation. Earlier, the Hungarian Ministry of Foreign Affairs and Foreign Trade stated, "It is important that an independent international body investigate the circumstances of the Malaysian airliner tragedy."

Iceland – Icelandic Minister for Foreign Affairs Gunnar Bragi Sveinsson expressed condolences to the families and friends of those on board the airplane and strongly condemned the shooting down of the aircraft. In his statement, he said, "It is horrendous that a passenger plane has been shot down with advanced anti-aircraft weapons." He urged that an objective international investigation be initiated immediately and stressed that rescue workers must be allowed to perform their duties properly. The minister also called on the international community to unite in efforts to stop the conflict in Eastern Ukraine.

India – Indian President Pranab Mukherjee deeply condoled the crash of the passenger jet in eastern Ukraine and expressed grief and sympathy over the tragedy, which claimed 298 lives. In a message to the King of Malaysia, Abdul Halim, the President said, "I wish to convey my sincere grief and sympathy to the government and people of Malaysia on the crash of Malaysia Airlines flight in eastern Ukraine yesterday, leading to the loss of so many precious lives. Our thoughts and prayers are with the families of the nationals of Malaysia and other countries who lost their lives in this tragic incident."

Indian Minister of External Affairs Sushma Swaraj personally wrote to Malaysian Foreign Affairs Minister Anifah Aman to convey that India would stand by the people and government of Malaysia during this difficult time.

Indonesia – Indonesian President Susilo Bambang Yudhoyono called for those responsible for shooting down the aircraft to be punished unequivocally and offered assistance with the investigation. The Indonesian government took a cautious diplomatic stance regarding Russia's alleged involvement in the downing. The President also extended his "deep condolences" to Malaysia and the families of the victims.

Iran – Iranian President Hassan Rouhani expressed his deepest sympathy to the Malaysian Prime Minister and the citizens of Malaysia over the tragic crash. In a message conveyed to Prime Minister Najib, which was made available by the Iranian Embassy in Malaysia, he said, "The news of the air crash has caused deep regret and sorrow. Undoubtedly, this tragedy and the immense grief that affects many nations highlight the importance of peaceful coexistence and collective action against violence and conflict, in the view of the international community."

Ireland – Irish Minister for Foreign Affairs and Trade, Charles Flanagan, said in a statement, "Ireland fully supports calls for a full, independent international investigation to establish the cause of this grave tragedy and to ensure that those responsible are swiftly brought to justice."

Italy – Italian President Giorgio Napolitano is awaiting a "confident, fair, and transparent collaborative effort" to clarify the causes of the crash. He added, "I have learned with dismay and deep sorrow the news of the tragic disaster that occurred in the Ukrainian sky, resulting in the loss of so many innocent lives. At this time of mourning, on behalf of the entire Italian people, I offer sincere sympathy to the families of the victims."

Foreign Minister Federica Mogherini, in a statement, said, "I learned with great suffering about the Malaysian Airlines passenger plane's tragedy. It is now necessary to shed light on what happened as soon as possible through an independent commission of inquiry to uncover the truth."

Jamaica – The Jamaican Senate expressed their deepest "sympathies and heartfelt sorrow" for what had taken place and called for an "immediate investigation into the matter." The international community was also urged to be "more assertive and more effective" against terrorists.

Japan – According to Japanese Chief Cabinet Secretary Yoshihide Suga, Japan will step up sanctions against Russia following the downing of Malaysia Airlines Flight MH17. Japan also expressed its sympathies and declared that the Japanese flag at its embassy in Malaysia would fly at half-mast on 22 August.

Kazakhstan – Kazakhstani President Nursultan Nazarbayev expressed his condolences to Malaysian Prime Minister Najib Razak and the Malaysians who lost their loved ones in the crash of Malaysia Airlines Flight MH17 in Ukraine. In his letter to the Malaysian Prime Minister, he said he "was deeply saddened by the news of the crash of the Malaysian Airlines plane on the territory of Ukraine. On behalf of all Kazakhstanis, he expressed his sincere condolences to Malaysians on their tragic loss."

Kenya – Kenyan President Uhuru Kenyatta conveyed a condolence message to the people of Malaysia via Twitter.

Kosovo – Kosovo's Foreign Affairs Minister Enver Hoxhaj condemned what he called a terrorist attack against the civilian population and the international community, stating that "the Republic of Kosovo strongly supports an international investigation to clarify the circumstances of this shocking tragedy. The people of Kosovo stand by the victim's families, people, and governments during these painful moments of this international tragedy," wrote Mr. Hoxhaj in telegrams sent to his counterparts in the countries whose citizens lost their lives in the tragic crash.

Laos – Laotian Prime Minister Thongsing Thammavong sent his message of condolences to his Malaysian, Indonesian, and Australian counterparts regarding the crash of the airplane. Meanwhile, Deputy Minister of Foreign Affairs Saleumxay Kommasith represented the Lao government in expressing the nation's sadness over the Malaysian plane crash in Ukraine during the signing of a condolence book at the Malaysian Embassy in Vientiane. In his statement, he said, "On behalf of the people of Laos, I would like to express my deepest condolences over the tragic accident involving Malaysia Airlines Flight MH17 that crashed in eastern Ukraine on 17 July 2014, killing all 298 passengers, including 43 Malaysian citizens and crew members. I would like to share this moment of sadness and my heartfelt sympathies with the government and people of Malaysia."

Latvia – Latvian President Andris Bērziņš urged a thorough and conclusive investigation of the MH17 disaster to identify the perpetrators responsible for downing the passenger airliner. The president described it as "a horrific precedent that madmen could just go and murder so many innocent people." He added, "The guilty must be punished so that no one would ever again feel the urge to play with such heavy, sophisticated weapons without considering the consequences — 'let it loose, see where it hits.'"

Meanwhile, Latvian Foreign Affairs Minister Edgars Rinkēvičs banned three popular Russian musicians — Oleg Gazmanov, Joseph Kobzon and Alla Perfilova — from traveling to Latvia indefinitely. The decision was made in accordance with the Immigration Law, and Rinkēvičs previously announced that he had decided to ban "apologists of Russian imperialism and aggression" from attending "high society" events in Latvia. The ministry's press secretary, Karlis Eihenbaums, told LETA that the minister's decision was related to recent events in Ukraine, including the crash of a passenger plane in eastern Ukraine, which resulted in 298 casualties.

Lebanon – Lebanon's Foreign Affairs Ministry condemned all terrorist attacks, regardless of their motivation or cause, and extended condolences to the victims of the plane crash.

Lithuania – Lithuanian President Dalia Grybauskaitė called the incident a "brutal act of terror" and stressed that those responsible must be clearly identified and brought to justice. She stated, "It is a brutal act of terror that has explicitly shown that efforts by the international community to resolve the crisis in Ukraine have been too weak. It is unjustifiable that in the 21st century, Europe, innocent people—dozens of children among them—die from weapons. Perpetrators must be named clearly and held accountable. Conditions must be established for international observers to identify the executors and organizers of this tragedy."

Prime Minister Algirdas Butkevičius also conveyed condolences over the crash, saying, "We are deeply shaken by the event, which killed 298 innocent people, including children. The accident could have clearly been prevented if the conflict in Eastern Ukraine had not escalated."

Raimonda Murmokaitė, Lithuania's Permanent Representative to the United Nations, called for respect for the memory of the victims of the MH17 catastrophe and condemned any attempts to influence or interfere with the independent investigation conducted by the Dutch Safety Board.

Luxembourg – Prime Minister Xavier Bettel expressed his deep sympathy to the families of the victims. In his statement on Twitter, he said, "My thoughts are with the families and friends of the many innocent victims of the MH17 crash. This terrible incident shocked me deeply and highlights the need for us to continue fighting for peace." A memorial service was held on 27 September for all the victims on board.

Malaysia – Malaysian Deputy Foreign Minister Hamzah Zainuddin said that the Foreign Ministry would be working closely with the Russian and Ukrainian governments regarding the incident. Prime Minister Najib Razak later stated that Malaysia was unable to verify the cause of the crash and demanded that the perpetrators be punished. The Malaysian government declared that the national flag would be flown at half-mast from 18 July to 21 July.

Maldives – President Abdulla Yameen sent his condolences to the King of Malaysia and the Netherlands, as well as to Prime Ministers Najib and Rutte, and to all the victims' families involved.

Mauritania – Mauritanian President Mohamed Ould Abdel Aziz sent a message of condolences to the King of the Netherlands following the crash in which many Dutch citizens were killed. In his message, he said, "Your Majesty, it is with great sadness that we learned of the crash on 17 July 2014 of the Malaysia Airlines aircraft in which several Dutch citizens were killed. In these painful circumstances, I express to Your Majesty, and through you, to the people and government of the Netherlands and to the families of the victims, our sincere condolences and compassion, while assuring our solidarity in this painful time."

Mexico – The Mexican Foreign Minister, José Antonio Meade, on behalf of the Mexican government, expressed deep shock and sadness. In a joint statement from MIKTA, Mexico also strongly condemned the downing of Malaysia Airlines Flight MH17, which took the lives of 298 innocent civilians, including many children. They expressed their deepest condolences to the families of the victims and to the governments and peoples of the 12 states whose nationals lost their lives in this heinous act. The statement called for a full, thorough, and independent international investigation into the incident in accordance with international civil aviation guidelines, and demanded that all military activities in the area cease to allow immediate, safe, secure, and unrestricted access for investigating authorities.

Moldova – Moldovan President Nicolae Timofti conveyed a message of condolence. In a statement, the President expressed sympathy for the families of the victims of the disaster involving Malaysia Airlines Flight MH17, which had 298 people on board. "It is with deep regret and sympathy that we learned of the tragic plane crash, resulting in numerous casualties. At this time of mourning, on behalf of the Moldovan people and on my own behalf, I express sincere feelings of solidarity and sympathy."

Namibia – Namibian President Hifikepunye Pohamba described the shooting down as "tragic." In his condolence message to Malaysian Prime Minister Najib Razak, the President extended his deepest sorrow to the "bereaved families of many nationalities who lost their loved ones." He said, "On behalf of the Government and the people of Namibia, and indeed on my own behalf, I wish to extend our most sincere condolences to the government and the people of Malaysia, and I wish the Malaysian government strength as they deal with yet another air tragedy following the disappearance of Malaysia Airlines Flight MH370 on 8 March."

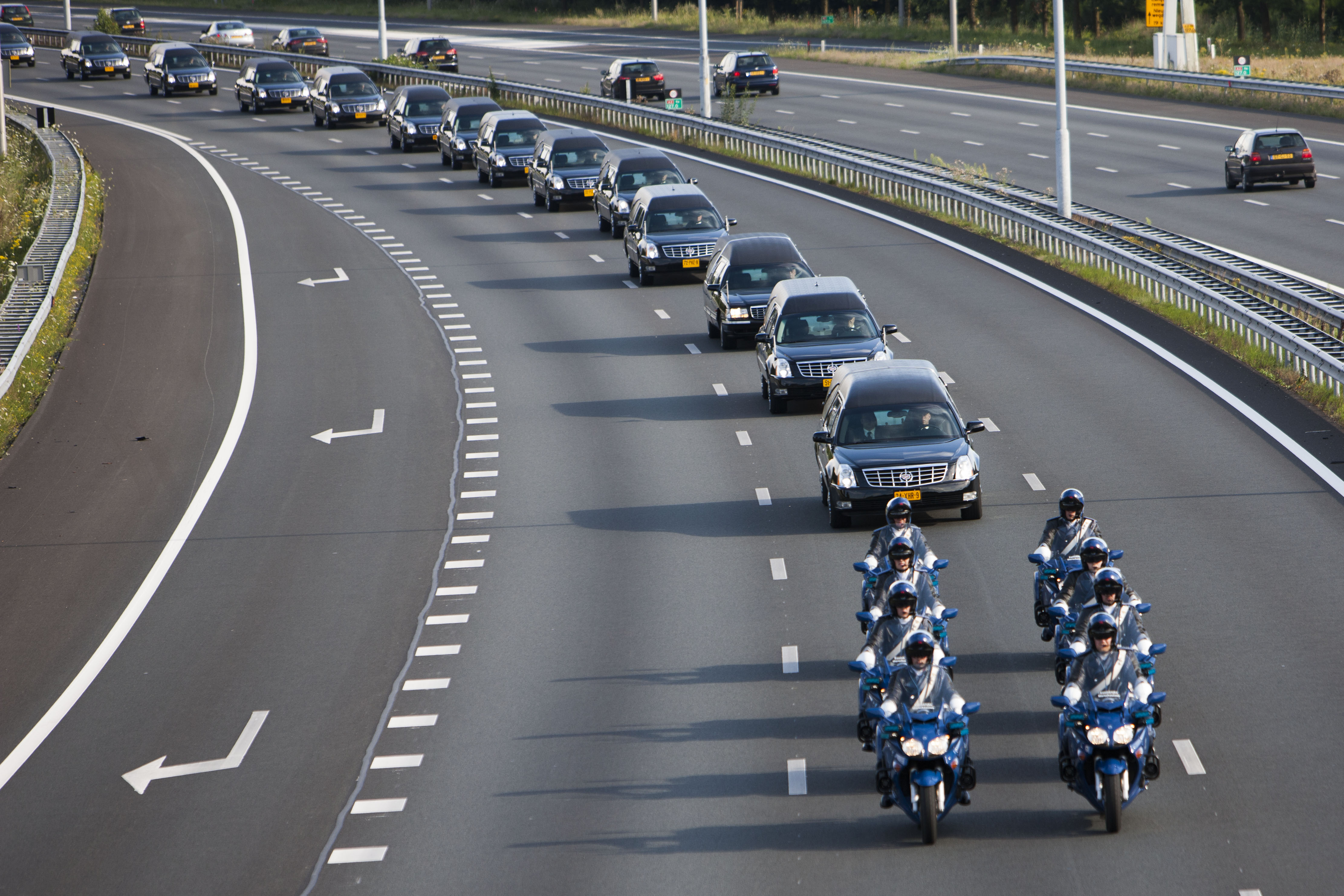
Convoy of 40 hearses heading to Hilversum in the Netherlands, while other traffic is stopped

Netherlands – Dutch Prime Minister Mark Rutte and King Willem-Alexander voiced their shock at the crash. Minister of Foreign Affairs Frans Timmermans joined the Dutch investigation team sent to Ukraine. Dutch government buildings flew the flag at half-mast on 18 July. Music was canceled, and festivities were toned down during the last, usually festive, day of the Nijmegen Marches. On 21 July, the Netherlands officially opened a war crimes investigation into the downing of the aircraft. The country's prosecutor was already in Ukraine for that purpose. Rutte also threatened tough action against Russia if it avoided assisting in the investigation. On 23 July, when the first victims were repatriated, it was a National Day of Mourning in the Netherlands—the first official Day of Mourning since 1962, following the death of Queen Wilhelmina.

New Zealand – The New Zealand Parliament unanimously passed a motion expressing New Zealand's condolences to the families of the victims of Malaysia Airlines flight MH17 and criticizing those who have impeded investigations into the tragedy. Prime Minister John Key said, "New Zealand calls on those groups to cooperate immediately and unreservedly with international authorities," and he urged Russia to use its influence with those groups to ensure the investigation and recovery operation proceed appropriately and unimpeded. New Zealand was also saddened by the "grievous" casualties borne by other nations, particularly the Netherlands, Malaysia, and Australia.

Nigeria – Nigeria expressed full support for an independent international investigation into the airline flight disaster in eastern Ukraine. Nigeria's Permanent Representative to the United Nations, Professor Joy Ogwu, expressed her country's support at an emergency session of the United Nations Security Council. She described the downing of flight MH17 as an "apocalyptic end of the world" and urged the rebels in eastern Ukraine "to cooperate fully and unconditionally with investigations into the crash."

Norway – Prime Minister Erna Solberg, during an interview with NRK, called it a tragic event. "Our thoughts go out first and foremost to all the families and relatives who have lost their loved ones. We have sent our condolences to the Netherlands and Malaysia, where many of the victims came from, and I'm saddened by the terrible Malaysia Airlines incident. My thoughts are with all those affected."

Pakistan – Prime Minister Nawaz Sharif sent a letter to his Malaysian counterpart, Najib Razak, expressing condolences and grief on behalf of the government and people of Pakistan. "In this hour of bereavement and immense grief, the government and people of Pakistan join me in expressing our heartfelt condolences and sympathies to the government and people of Malaysia, and to the families of all passengers who were on board the unfortunate flight."

Panama – The Panamanian government conveyed its condolences to the families of the victims and called on the international community for lasting peace. "Our solidarity and condolences at this difficult time for the Malaysian people and more than nine nations affected by this incident," said the Panamanian Ministry of Foreign Affairs in a statement, which also called for clarification of the cause.

Papua New Guinea – Prime Minister Peter O'Neill expressed his sorrow and concern at the loss of the flight. In his statement, he said, "The loss of this aircraft has shocked the world. This is a tragic day for people from many nations. Our sympathy and prayers are with the families who are now left to deal with this tragic loss. On behalf of the people of Papua New Guinea, I express my deep condolences to the nations of the passengers. We pray for the people in the Netherlands, Malaysia, Australia, Indonesia, the United Kingdom, Germany, Belgium, the Philippines, the United States, Canada, and New Zealand who have lost citizens. The cause of the incident must be fully investigated, and there needs to be a United Nations-led investigation into the crash of this aircraft. If it is found that this aircraft was brought down by human action, justice must be sought."

Philippines – The Department of Foreign Affairs, in a statement, said, "The Philippines condemns in the strongest manner the recent shooting down of Malaysian Airlines flight MH17 over Ukraine. We convey our profound condolences for all who perished in this tragedy, and those responsible should be made fully accountable for this unconscionable assault on a non-military aircraft that posed no threat whatsoever to any party." The Philippine embassy in Malaysia flew its flag at half-mast on 24 July.

Poland – President Bronisław Komorowski described the attack as an "unbelievable and shameful act, which is an act of terror." He stressed that the parties responsible for the downing of the aeroplane over the eastern territories of Ukraine should be held to account. On 24 July, the Polish government canceled the "Polish Year in Russia" and "Russian Year in Poland" events that were planned for 2015.

Portugal – Portuguese President Aníbal Cavaco Silva sent his condolences to the families of the 298 people who lost their lives in the Malaysian aeroplane crash, as well as to all those who "suffered the pain of human loss," and to the Heads of State of the Netherlands, Malaysia, and all concerned countries. The Portuguese government issued a statement expressing condolences to the victims' relatives and stressed that "the circumstances of this tragedy demand an independent investigation." The statement called for full cooperation and information exchange between the parties involved and emphasized that this incident reinforces the need to find a peaceful solution for the territory of eastern Ukraine and the urgency of an immediate ceasefire in the region.

Romania – Romanian President Traian Băsescu expressed his shock and dismay at the tragic event that occurred in Ukraine's airspace. He called for the immediate clarification of the circumstances surrounding the plane crash and emphasized the need for European Union experts to participate in the investigation alongside Ukrainian authorities.

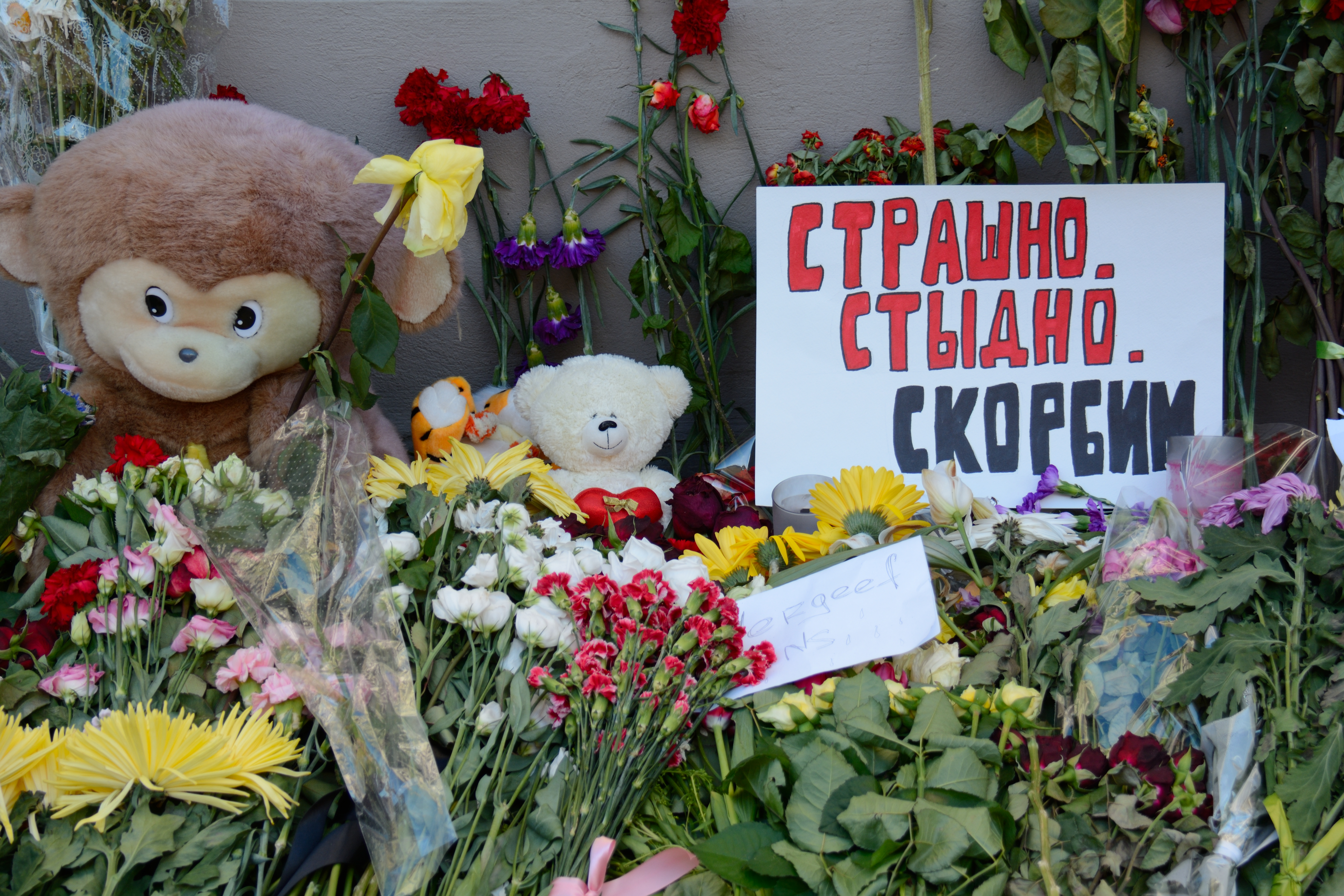
Makeshift memorial at the Embassy of the Netherlands in Moscow, Russia

Russia – Russian President Vladimir Putin stated that responsibility for the crash rested with "the country whose airspace the plane was in when it crashed" and added that "the disaster would not have occurred if military action in southeast Ukraine had not been resumed." He emphasized the importance of refraining from drawing hasty conclusions or making politicized statements before the investigation was complete. Putin affirmed that Russia was prepared to provide the necessary assistance to organize and conduct a thorough international inquiry led by ICAO.

On 19 July, the Russian Ministry of Defence released a statement titled "10 Questions to the Ukrainian Government," reiterating accusations previously published in Russian media. Meanwhile, Russian citizens paid tribute by bringing flowers to the Dutch embassy in Moscow.

Saudi Arabia – Saudi Arabian Ambassador to Malaysia, Fahad A. H. Alrashid, expressed his sympathy and sadness over the aircraft tragedy. In his statement, he said, "I'm sorry about what happened to the aircraft, and I hope God will give strength to the families." His remarks came after attending an Iftar event on 25 July.

Seychelles – Seychellois President James Michel expressed his sincere condolences to the King of the Netherlands, the government and people of the Netherlands, as well as to the Prime Minister of Malaysia and the Malaysian people. He described the attack as "an incomprehensible human tragedy."

Singapore – In a statement issued by the Ministry of Foreign Affairs, the Government and people of Singapore extended their deepest condolences to the families of the victims of the tragic crash. The statement read: "We stand in solidarity with the Government and people of Malaysia during this difficult period. It is important that a full and transparent investigation be conducted to determine the cause of the crash. The investigation team should be granted full access to the affected areas and evidence. We stand ready to provide any possible assistance."

Slovakia – Slovak President Andrej Kiska sent letters of condolence to the Dutch and Malaysian monarchs. In these letters, the President expressed his deep sorrow over the tragic fate of flight MH17 and extended his heartfelt sympathies to the victims' families. He also conveyed his strong belief that the causes and circumstances of the tragedy would be thoroughly investigated with the assistance of international experts without delay. Similarly, the Slovak Foreign Ministry expressed its sincere condolences to all those affected by the tragedy and called on the relevant authorities to ensure an independent international investigation into its potential causes.

Slovenia – The Slovenian Ministry of Foreign Affairs called for an independent and comprehensive international investigation into the crash of flight MH17 over eastern Ukraine. In a statement, the ministry emphasized, "Only on the basis of such an investigation can those responsible for the tragedy be held accountable."

Solomon Islands – Prime Minister Gordon Darcy Lilo expressed his condolences to the families of the victims of the airline disaster. In a statement, he said, "I join world leaders in expressing sympathy to the families of the victims of MH17 and strongly condemn this horrendous act of terrorism against innocent global citizens. I support the call of world leaders for an international, independent investigation into the downing of the plane to identify the perpetrators, who must face justice for this unspeakable act." He further added, "The Government and people of the Solomon Islands are in shock over this act of terrorism and join the rest of the world in mourning the loss of innocent lives on the MH17 flight."

South Africa – South African Minister of International Relations and Cooperation, Maite Nkoana-Mashabane, urged world leaders not to jump to conclusions regarding the incident. President Jacob Zuma sent a message of condolence to Malaysia and called for an independent investigation, stating:

"We also extend our sympathies to the Government and the people of Malaysia, as well as all countries that have lost their citizens in the tragic crash. South Africa calls for a thorough, transparent, and independent investigation to determine the cause of the incident."

South Korea – South Korean President Park Geun-hye sent messages of condolence to Malaysian Prime Minister Najib Razak and Dutch Prime Minister Mark Rutte regarding the downing of Malaysia Airlines flight MH17. The President expressed her condolences and sympathy to the victims and their bereaved families, hoping that in the near future, the Dutch and Malaysian people will be able to overcome this shock and sadness.

Spain – Spanish Prime Minister Mariano Rajoy said in a statement, "The world has a right to know who fired the missile that brought down the Malaysia Airlines plane in pro-Russian separatist territory in eastern Ukraine. The world has a right to know who carried out this barbaric act, and the world has a right to know what happened. Everyone must do everything possible to ensure that a savage act like this doesn't happen again." Earlier, the Spanish Foreign Ministry expressed its condolences, sharing the pain of the families and loved ones of the 298 victims. Spain hopes an investigation can quickly explain the circumstances of the accident and urged the parties involved to participate fully in the investigation.

Sri Lanka – Sri Lankan President Mahinda Rajapaksa conveyed his condolences via Twitter to the families who lost loved ones on Malaysian Airlines Flight MH17. In his statement, he said, "Please convey my condolences to the people of Malaysia on the loss of loved ones on Malaysian Airlines Flight MH17." He also added, "I want to send out my condolences, along with those of the Sri Lankan people, to all other families suffering from the loss of a loved one on MH17." In a statement released by the Sri Lankan Ministry of External Affairs, it said, "The government, together with the people of Sri Lanka, conveys heartfelt condolences and deepest sympathies to the families of the passengers and crew who were on board the flight, and expresses solidarity with those nations whose citizens perished in this appalling incident."

Suriname – Surinamese President Desi Bouterse sent a message of condolence to the Dutch government and expressed his sympathy for the victims and their bereaved families concerning the downing of Malaysia Airlines flight MH17. Schools and members of the Surinamese government signed the book of condolences at the Dutch embassy. Six of the victims were Dutch nationals of Surinamese origin, including a newlywed Indo Surinamese couple and four members of the Javanese Surinamese diaspora community.

Sweden – Prime Minister Fredrik Reinfeldt, on behalf of the Swedish government, sent a condolence letter to Malaysian Prime Minister Najib Razak and Dutch Prime Minister Mark Rutte. The Swedish flag was flown at half-mast on 23 July at the Swedish embassy in The Hague, the Netherlands. Meanwhile, Swedish Foreign Minister Carl Bildt described the downing of the plane as "an act by international gangsters."

Tajikistan – Tajikistani President Emomali Rahmon expressed his condolences to the Malaysian Prime Minister and the King of the Netherlands over the crash of the airplane. In his statement, he said, "The people of Tajikistan are deeply saddened to hear the news about the terrible tragedy of the Malaysia Airlines Boeing 777 that occurred over Ukraine, resulting in numerous casualties. I express my deepest condolences to the friendly and brotherly people of Malaysia and ask you to convey my most sincere words of compassion and support to the families and friends of the victims." In his condolences telegram to the Dutch King, he also expressed his most sincere condolences to the many Dutch people affected.

Tanzania – Tanzanian President Jakaya Kikwete sent a condolence message to the Malaysian Prime Minister. In a statement, he said, "I have learned with great shock and sorrow the sad news of the loss of so many lives due to the crash of a Malaysian airliner on its way from Amsterdam to Kuala Lumpur, which occurred on Ukrainian territory on Thursday, 17th July 2014. The crash is an immense tragedy not only for the loved ones of those who perished but also for all the people of Malaysia and their friends. As a country, our thoughts and prayers are with the people of Malaysia during this time of grief. On behalf of the Government and the people of Tanzania, and indeed on my own behalf, I offer you our sincere condolences, support, and solidarity."

Thailand – The head of the National Council for Peace and Order (NCPO), General Prayuth Chan-ocha, expressed condolences in a statement to the countries impacted by the Malaysia Airlines flight MH17 crash in Ukraine. On behalf of the Thai government, he extended his condolences to world leaders who lost their citizens and to the families of the many victims. He added, "Thailand stands in solidarity with the peoples and governments of the crash victims at this difficult time. Thailand also demands an independent and transparent investigation into the incident and is ready to provide assistance to the international community."

The Gambia – The Gambian Ambassador to Malaysia, Jobe-Njie, representing the Gambian President and the people of Gambia, conveyed her sympathies over the tragic accident involving the Malaysian national air carrier.

Trinidad and Tobago – Prime Minister Kamla Persad-Bissessar, expressed her condolences. She said, "It is with great sadness that I learned of the tragedy of Malaysia Airlines flight MH17 on 17 July 2014, in which 289 people lost their lives. Among the victims, 189 are reported to be Dutch nationals, 44 are citizens of Malaysia, 27 are from Australia, and others are from Indonesia, the United Kingdom, Germany, Belgium, the Philippines, Canada, and New Zealand. On behalf of the Government and People of the Republic of Trinidad and Tobago, I extend deep condolences to the Governments and Peoples of these countries on the loss of their loved ones—family members, friends, and colleagues. I join our prayers with theirs and trust that our expression of solidarity will strengthen their spirit during this very challenging time."

Turkey – Turkish President Abdullah Gül offered his condolences to the Dutch and Malaysian Kings. The Turkish Foreign Ministry called the plane crash an act of terrorism that requires a thorough investigation.

Turkmenistan – Turkmen President Gurbanguly Berdimuhamedow sent condolences to the Malaysian Prime Minister, Dutch King, and Australian Governor-General over the plane crash, which resulted in the deaths of passengers, most of whom were citizens of these countries. In his statement, he said, "On behalf of the people and government of Turkmenistan, I express deep sympathy and support to the families and friends of the victims."

Ukraine – Ukrainian President Petro Poroshenko vowed support for a Dutch probe into the crash, which he called an act of terrorism. He offered condolences for the air disaster during a telephone conversation with Dutch Prime Minister Mark Rutte. Ukrainian citizens brought flowers to the Dutch and Malaysian embassies in Kyiv in support.

United Arab Emirates – UAE President Sheikh Khalifa bin Zayed Al Nahyan sent a message of condolence to Malaysian King Tuanku Abdul Halim Mu'adzam Shah regarding the tragedy. UAE Vice President, Prime Minister, and Ruler of Dubai Sheikh Mohammed bin Rashid Al Maktoum, along with Abu Dhabi Crown Prince and Deputy Supreme Commander of the UAE Armed Forces General Sheikh Mohamed bin Zayed Al Nahyan, also sent similar messages of condolence to Malaysian Prime Minister Najib Razak. The UAE Disaster Victims Identification (DVI) team was sent to assist in identifying the remains of the victims killed in the downing of the aircraft.

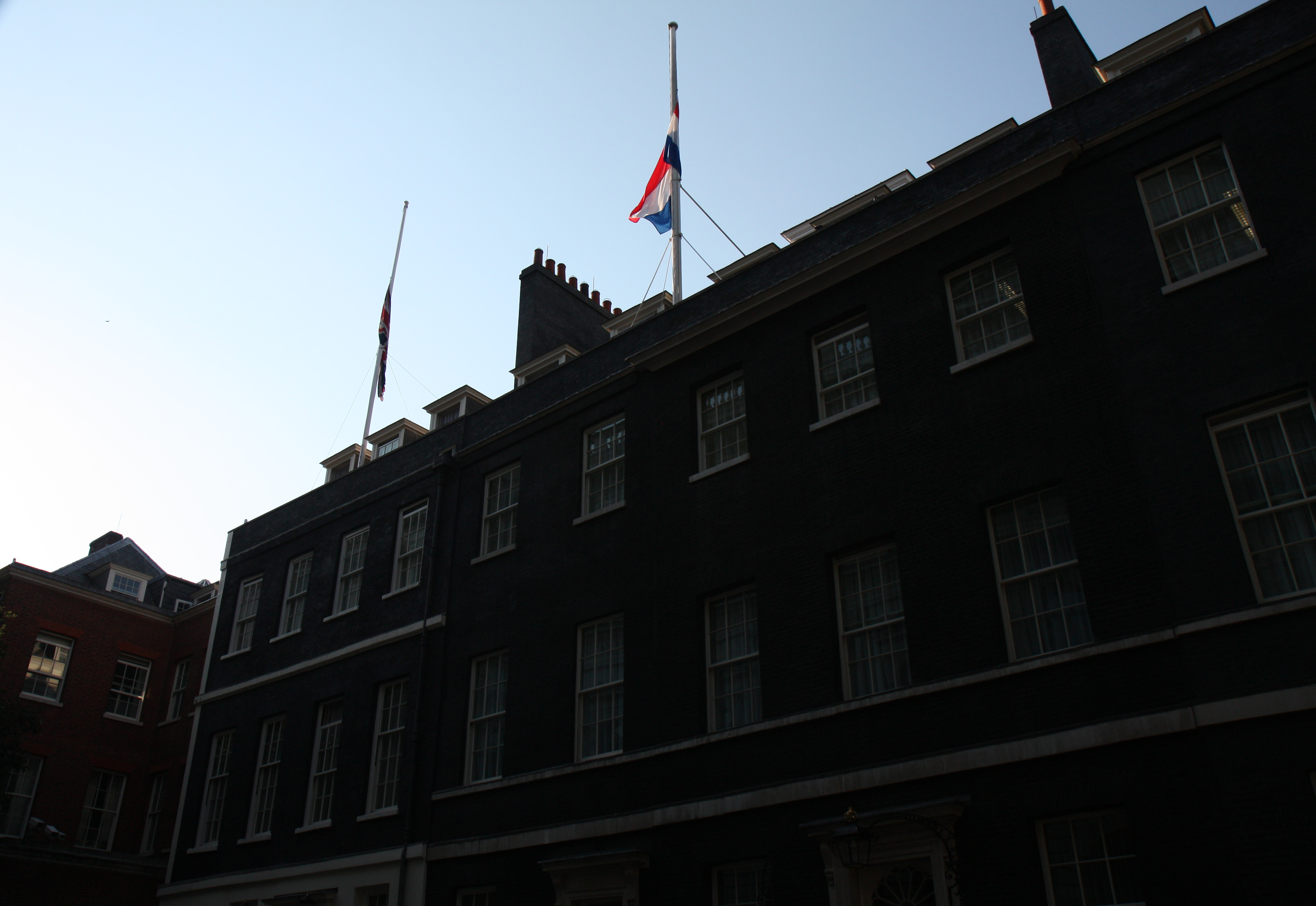
Flags flying half-mast at Downing Street, London

United Kingdom – The British government requested an emergency meeting of the United Nations Security Council and called an emergency Cobra meeting after the incident. Prime Minister David Cameron stated that he was "shocked and saddened by the Malaysian air disaster" and emphasized that "those responsible must be brought to account." The Department for Transport ordered that "flights already airborne" bypass the southeastern regions of the country.

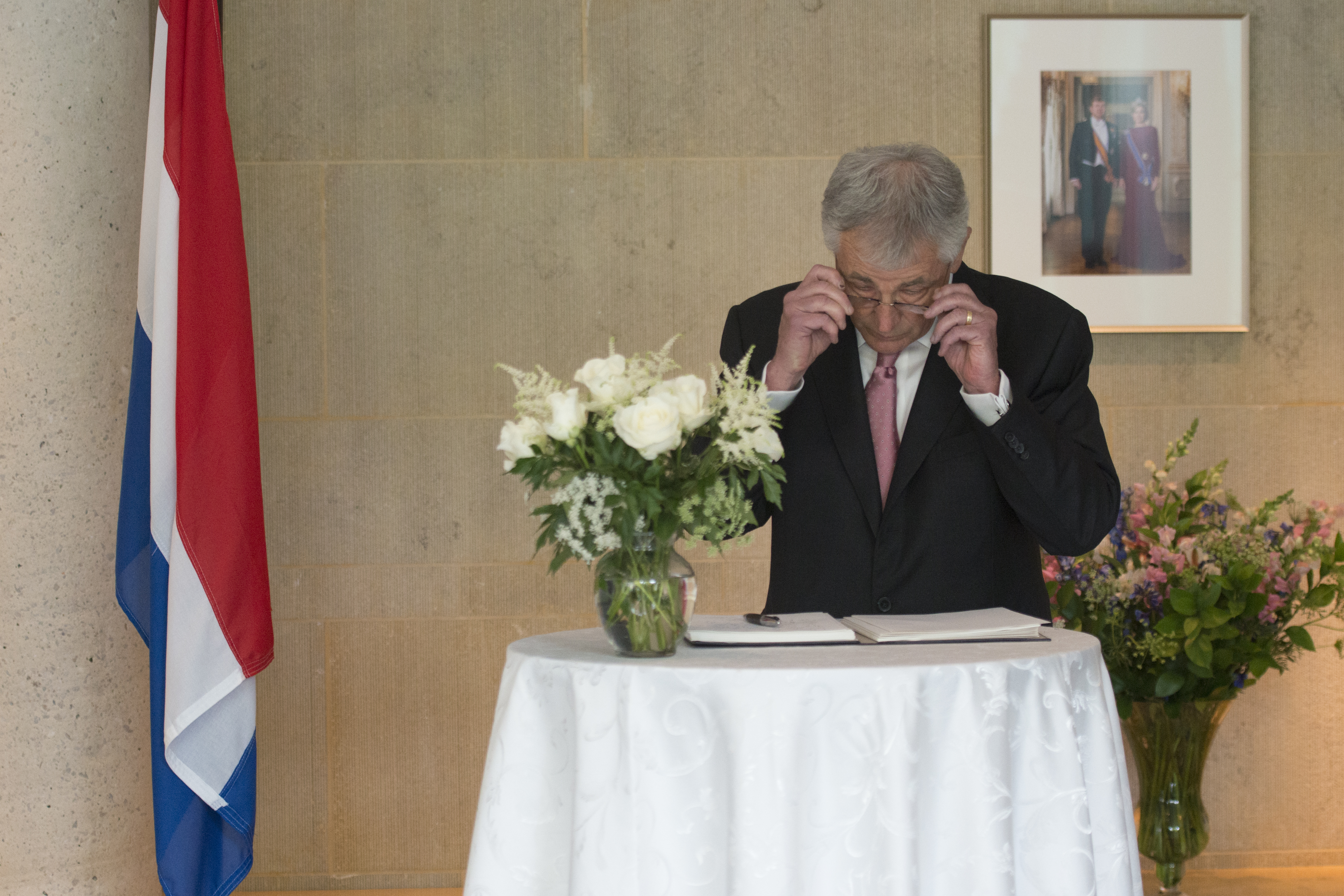
United States Secretary of Defense Chuck Hagel signs a condolence book in the Netherlands embassy in Washington D.C.

United States – US President Barack Obama stated that the US would help determine the cause of the crash. In a press statement, White House spokesman Josh Earnest called for an immediate ceasefire in Ukraine to allow for a full investigation. Vice-President Joe Biden said the plane appeared to have been deliberately shot down and pledged US assistance for the investigation. US Ambassador to the United Nations Samantha Power stated that the flight "was likely downed by a surface-to-air missile, an SA-11, operated from a separatist-held location in eastern Ukraine," adding that the US could not "rule out technical assistance by Russian personnel" in operating the system. She also stated that "Russia must end this war." President Obama later emphasized that Russia should "pivot away from the strategy they've been taking and get serious about trying to resolve hostilities within Ukraine."

Uruguay – The Uruguayan government condemned "any act of aggression" and sent a message of sympathy to the families of the victims. The government, under President José Mujica, expressed "deep regret over the tragic death of 298 people." According to the Uruguayan Foreign Ministry, they condemned the use of violence and "any act of aggression," but made no clear reference to the suspicion that the plane was shot down by a missile.

Venezuela – The Venezuelan Foreign Ministry, in a statement about the plane crash, highlighted that the people and government of Venezuela join in mourning with the victims' families and hope for a necessary investigation to accurately identify those responsible for these acts.

Vietnam – President Trương Tấn Sang sent a message of condolences to the Malaysian King, while Prime Minister Nguyễn Tấn Dũng and Deputy Prime Minister and Foreign Minister Phạm Bình Minh offered sympathies to the Malaysian Prime Minister and Foreign Minister, as well as to the Dutch Prime Minister. The Vietnamese Ministry of Foreign Affairs, through its spokesman Lê Hải Bình, said in a statement, "We are deeply saddened to hear about the crash of Malaysia Airlines flight MH17, which caused massive fatalities. We would like to extend our deepest condolences and sympathy to the governments and people of the countries whose citizens were killed in the accident, as well as to the families of the victims."

== Organisations ==
- Association of Southeast Asian Nations – ASEAN member states strongly condemned the downing of Flight MH17 and called for an independent and transparent investigation into the tragedy. ASEAN member states also expressed their profound sorrow and extended heartfelt condolences to the families of those on board.
- Donbass People's Militia – Pro-Russian-rebel commander Igor Girkin was quoted as saying that "a significant number of the bodies weren't fresh," though he admitted he could not confirm this information. He further stated, "Ukrainian authorities are capable of any baseness." Girkin also claimed that large quantities of blood serum and medications were found among the plane's remnants.
- European Union – European Union representatives José Manuel Barroso and Herman Van Rompuy issued a joint statement calling for an immediate and thorough investigation into the incident. They also stated that Ukraine has the primary claim to the plane's black boxes.
- International Civil Aviation Organization – ICAO announced that it would send a team of experts to assist Ukraine's National Bureau of Incidents and Accidents Investigation of Civil Aircraft (NBAAII). According to ICAO, Ukraine is responsible for leading the investigation under Article 26 of the Convention on International Civil Aviation.
- North Atlantic Treaty Organization – NATO emphasized that the incident underscored the increasing danger of the conflict in the region. NATO Secretary General Anders Fogh Rasmussen stated, "I am profoundly shocked and saddened by the crash of a Malaysia Airlines passenger aircraft in Ukraine today, with the loss of many lives." After extending his condolences to those affected, he added, "It is important that a full international investigation be launched immediately, without any hindrance, to establish the facts, and that those who may be responsible are swiftly brought to justice."
- Organization for Security and Co-operation in Europe – Chairperson-in-Office and Swiss President Didier Burkhalter expressed his "sincere condolences to the families of the many victims of the shocking crash of Malaysia Airlines Flight MH17 over Ukrainian territory." He further stated, "The OSCE stands ready to support Ukraine in this difficult rescue operation in every possible way."
- United Nations Security Council – The U.N. Security Council held an emergency meeting on the Ukraine crisis. A British-drafted statement calling for "a full, thorough, and independent international investigation" into the cause of the crash was discussed. The statement also stressed the need for "all parties to grant immediate access to investigators at the crash site to determine the cause of the incident." On 21 July, the UNSC adopted Resolution 2166 to investigate the possible criminal aspects of the crash.

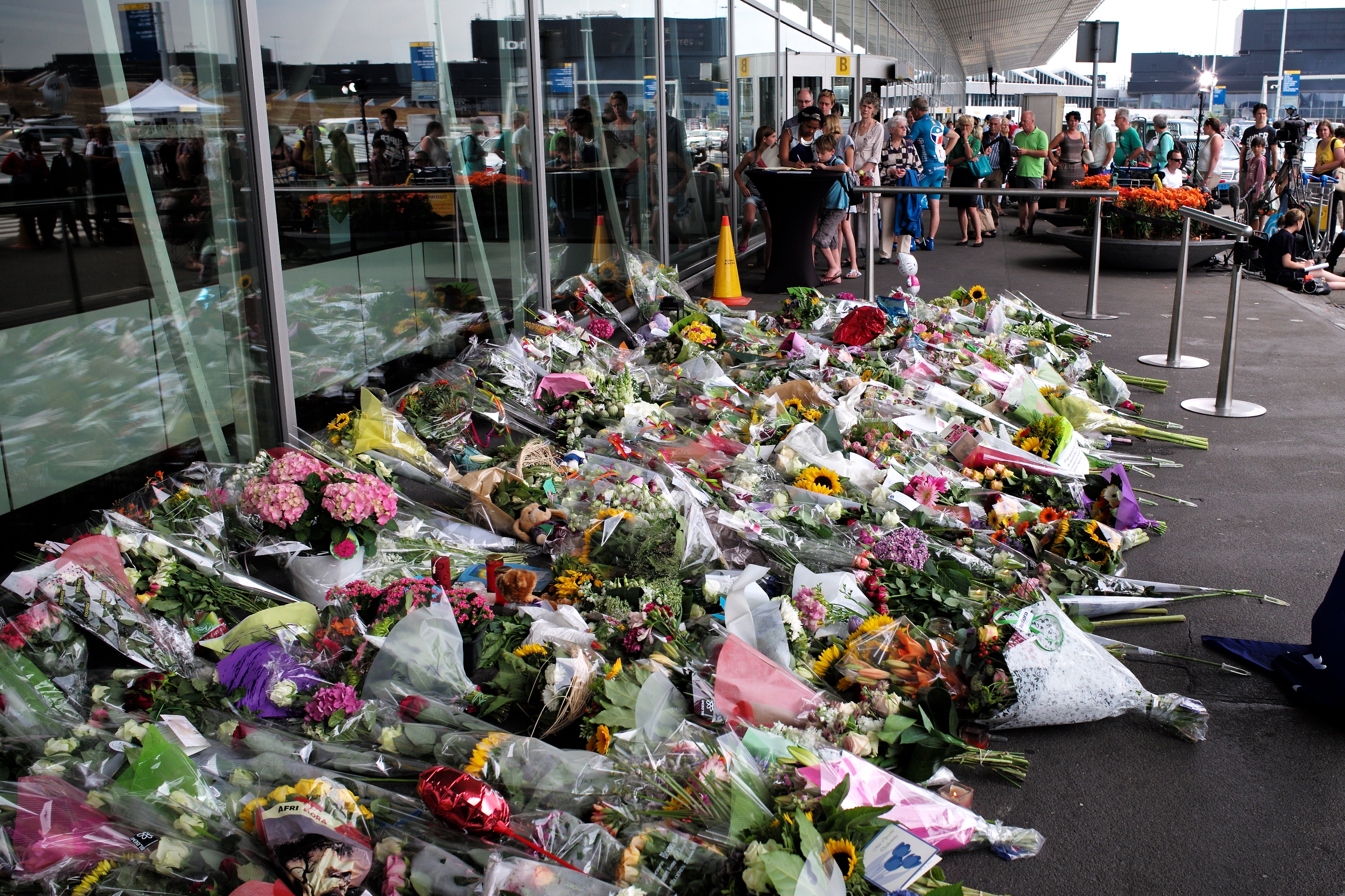
A makeshift memorial at Amsterdam Schiphol Airport, Netherlands, for the victims of flight MH17.

== Memorials ==
Since the crash, memorial services have been held in Australia and the Netherlands, with the Netherlands declaring a national day of mourning. The opening ceremony of the AIDS 2014 conference, which included several delegates aboard flight MH17, began with a tribute to the victims. In Malaysia, makeshift memorials were established in the capital city of Kuala Lumpur.
