= Sushma Swaraj =

Indian politician (1952–2019)

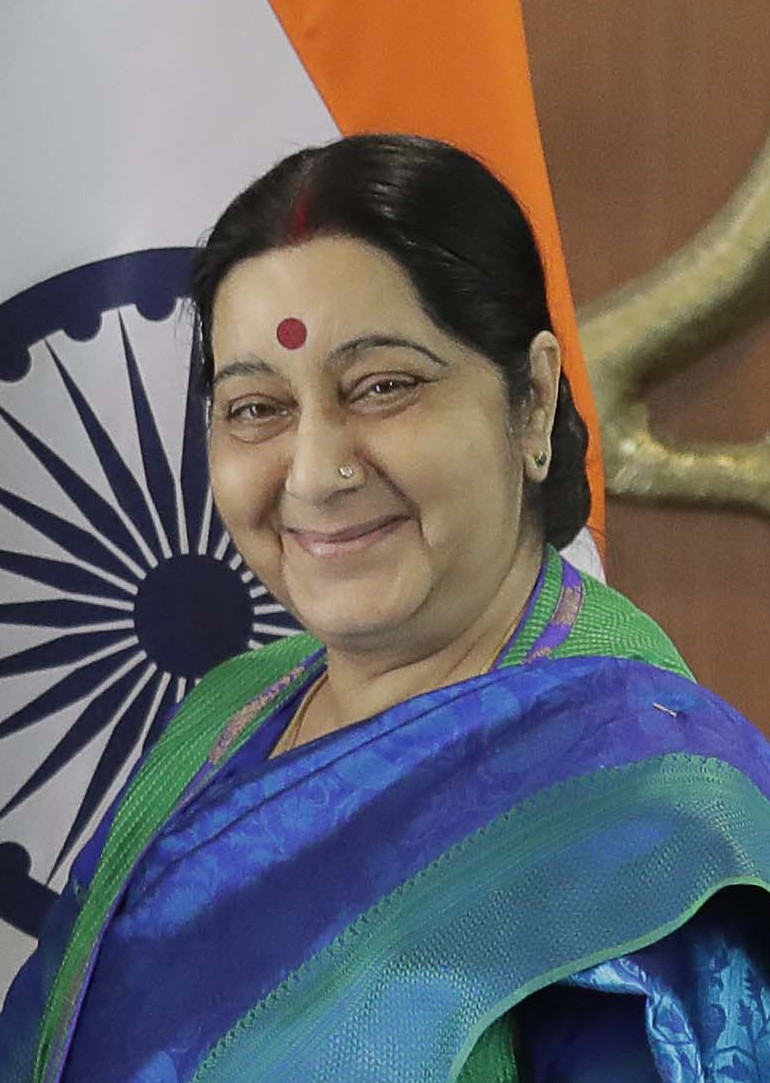
- Official portrait, 2017

29th Union Minister of External Affairs
- In office 26 May 2014 – 30 May 2019
- Prime Minister: Narendra Modi
- Preceded by: Salman Khurshid
- Succeeded by: S. Jaishankar

4th Union Minister of Overseas Indian Affairs
- In office 26 May 2014 – 7 January 2016
- Prime Minister: Narendra Modi
- Preceded by: Vayalar Ravi
- Succeeded by: office abolished

11th Leader of the Opposition in Lok Sabha
- In office 21 December 2009 – 19 May 2014
- Deputy: Gopinath Munde
- Speaker: Meira Kumar
- Preceded by: L. K. Advani
- Succeeded by: Rahul Gandhi (2024) (Note: This position was vacant from 26 May 2014 to 9 June 2024.) (Note: Succeeded by Mallikarjun Kharge Ravneet Singh Bittu Adhir Ranjan Chowdhury as Leader of INC in Lok Sabha)

19th Union Minister of Parliamentary Affairs
- In office 29 January 2003 – 22 May 2004
- Prime Minister: Atal Bihari Vajpayee
- Preceded by: Pramod Mahajan
- Succeeded by: Ghulam Nabi Azad

29th Union Minister of Health and Family Welfare
- In office 29 January 2003 – 22 May 2004
- Prime Minister: Atal Bihari Vajpayee
- Preceded by: C. P. Thakur
- Succeeded by: Anbumani Ramadoss

21st Union Minister of Information and Broadcasting
- In office 30 September 2000 – 29 January 2003
- Prime Minister: Atal Bihari Vajpayee
- Preceded by: Arun Jaitley
- Succeeded by: Ravi Shankar Prasad
- In office 19 March 1998 – 11 October 1998
- Prime Minister: Atal Bihari Vajpayee
- Preceded by: S. Jaipal Reddy
- Succeeded by: Pramod Mahajan
- In office 16 May 1996 – 1 June 1996
- Prime Minister: Atal Bihari Vajpayee
- Preceded by: P. A. Sangma
- Succeeded by: C. M. Ibrahim

Member of Parliament, Rajya Sabha
- In office 10 April 1990 – 9 April 1996
- Constituency: Haryana
- In office 3 April 2000 – 8 November 2000
- Constituency: Uttar Pradesh
- In office 9 November 2000 – 2 April 2006
- Succeeded by: Satyavrat Chaturvedi
- Constituency: Uttarakhand
- In office 3 April 2006 – 30 May 2009
- Constituency: Madhya Pradesh

5th Chief Minister of Delhi
- In office 13 October 1998 – 3 December 1998
- Lieutenant Governor: Vijai Kapoor
- Preceded by: Sahib Singh Verma
- Succeeded by: Sheila Dikshit

Member of Parliament, Lok Sabha
- In office 31 May 2009 – 24 May 2019
- Preceded by: Rampal Singh
- Succeeded by: Ramakant Bhargava
- Constituency: Vidisha, Madhya Pradesh
- In office 7 May 1996 – 3 October 1999
- Preceded by: Madan Lal Khurana
- Succeeded by: Vijay Kumar Malhotra
- Constituency: South Delhi, Delhi

Minister of Labour and Employment, Government of Haryana
- In office June 1977 – June 1979
- Chief Minister: Devi Lal

Minister of Education, Government of Haryana
- In office July 1987 – December 1989
- Chief Minister: Devi Lal

Personal details
- Born: Sushma Sharma; 14 February 1952 Ambala Cantonment, Punjab, India (present-day Haryana)
- Died: 6 August 2019 (aged 67) New Delhi, Delhi, India
- Cause of death: Cardiac arrest
- Party: Bharatiya Janata Party
- Other political affiliations: Janata Party
- Spouse: Swaraj Kaushal (m. 1975)
- Children: Bansuri Swaraj (daughter)
- Education: Sanatan Dharma College (BA); Panjab University (LLB)
- Profession: Advocate; politician; statesperson; diplomat
- Awards: Padma Vibhushan (2020)

Sushma Swaraj (née Sharma; 14 February 1952 – 6 August 2019) (Hindi pronunciation: [suʃmaː sʋəɾaːd͡ʒ]) was an Indian lawyer, politician and diplomat who served as the 5th Chief Minister of Delhi, and also the Minister of External Affairs of India in the First Modi ministry from 2014 to 2019. She was the second person to complete a 5-year term as the Minister of External Affairs, after Jawaharlal Nehru. A senior leader of the Bharatiya Janata Party (BJP), Swaraj was the second woman to hold the office of Minister of External Affairs, after Indira Gandhi. She was elected seven times as a Member of Parliament and three times as a Member of the Legislative Assembly. At the age of 25 in 1977, she became the youngest cabinet minister of the Indian state of Haryana. She also served as Chief Minister of Delhi for a short duration in 1998 and became the first female Chief Minister of Delhi.

In the 2014 Indian general election, Swaraj won the Vidisha constituency in Madhya Pradesh for a second term, retaining her seat by a margin of over 400,000 votes. She became the Minister of External Affairs in the union cabinet on 26 May 2014. Swaraj was called India's "best-loved politician" by the US daily Wall Street Journal. She decided not to contest the 2019 Indian general election as she was recovering from a kidney transplant and needed to "save herself from dust and stay safe from infection" and hence did not join the second Modi Ministry in 2019.

Swaraj died after cardiac arrest following a heart attack on the night of 6 August 2019. She was awarded the Padma Vibhushan, India's second highest civilian award, posthumously in 2020 in the field of Public Affairs.

== Early life and education ==
Sushma Swaraj (née Sharma) was born on 14 February 1952 at Ambala Cantonment, Punjab (now Haryana), into a Brahmin family, to Hardev Sharma and Shrimati Laxmi Devi. Her father was a prominent Rashtriya Swayamsevak Sangh member. Her parents hailed from the Dharampura area of Lahore, Pakistan. She was educated at Sanatan Dharma College in Ambala Cantonment and earned a bachelor's degree with majors in Sanskrit and Political Science. She studied law at Panjab University, Chandigarh. A state-level competition held by the Language Department of Haryana saw her winning the best Hindi Speaker award for three consecutive years. Sushma Swaraj was a strict vegetarian.

== Advocacy career ==
In 1973, Swaraj started practice as an advocate in the Supreme Court of India. She began her political career with Akhil Bharatiya Vidyarthi Parishad in the 1970s. Her husband, Swaraj Kaushal, was closely associated with the socialist leader George Fernandes and Sushma Swaraj became a part of George Fernandes's legal defence team in 1975. She actively participated in Jayaprakash Narayan's Total Revolution Movement. After the Emergency, she joined the Bharatiya Janata Party. Later, she became a national leader of the BJP.

== Political career ==
=== Early political career ===
She was a member of the Haryana Legislative Assembly from 1977 to 1982, winning the Ambala Cantonment assembly seat at the age of 25; and then, again from 1987 to 1990. In July 1977, she was sworn in as a Cabinet Minister in the Janata Party Government headed by then Chief Minister Devi Lal. She held the Labour and Employment ministries from 1977 to 1979. Later she became Minister of Education, Food and Civil supplies during 1987 to 1990. She became State President of the Janata Party (Haryana) in 1979, at the age of 27. She was Education Minister of Haryana state in the Bharatiya Janata Party–Lok Dal coalition government from 1987 to 1990.

In April 1990, she was elected as a member of the Rajya Sabha and remained there until she was elected to the 11th Lok Sabha from South Delhi constituency in 1996. Swaraj was elected to the 11th Lok Sabha from the South Delhi constituency in the April 1996 elections.

=== Minister of Information and Broadcasting (1996) ===
She served as Union Cabinet Minister for Information and Broadcasting during the 13-day government of PM Atal Bihari Vajpayee in 1996.

=== Chief Minister of Delhi (1998) ===
After a tenure in national level politics, she resigned from the Union Cabinet in October 1998 to take over as the Chief Minister of Delhi. She became the first female Chief Minister of Delhi. Swaraj resigned from the position in December the same year.

=== Minister of Information and Broadcasting (2000–2003) ===
She was re-elected to the 12th Lok Sabha from South Delhi Parliamentary constituency for a second term, in March 1998. Under the second PM Vajpayee Government, she was sworn in as Union Cabinet Minister for Information and Broadcasting with an additional charge of the Ministry of Telecommunications from 19 March 1998 to 12 October 1998. Her most notable decision during this period was to declare film production as an industry, which made the Indian film industry eligible for bank finance. She also started community radio at universities and other institutions.

In September 1999, Swaraj was nominated by the BJP to contest against the Congress party's national President Sonia Gandhi in the 13th Lok Sabha election, from the Bellary constituency in Karnataka, which had always been retained by Congress politicians since the first Indian general election in 1951–52. During her campaign in Bellary, she addressed public meetings in Kannada. She secured 358,000 votes in just 12 days of her election campaign. However, she lost the election by a 7% margin.

She returned to Parliament in April 2000 as a Rajya Sabha member from Uttar Pradesh. She was reallocated to Uttrakhand when the new state was carved out of Uttar Pradesh on 9 November 2000. She was inducted into the Union Cabinet as Minister for Information and Broadcasting, a position she held from September 2000 until January 2003.

A chance visit to Pakistan became one of the highlights of her term. As the Union Minister of Information and Broadcasting, she traveled to Pakistan in 2002 to represent India in the SAARC Ministerial Conference on Information. On March 8, she was invited for an interview in the studio of the state-run PTV, hosted by Talaat Hussain, a newspaper journalist at the time who went on later to become a prominent TV anchor. She deftly handled pointed questions about Kashmir by stating she wouldn't give a harsh answer as a guest in the country, upholding Indian culture and diplomatic decorum. That clip went viral years later on social media

=== Minister of Health & Family Welfare (2003–2004) ===
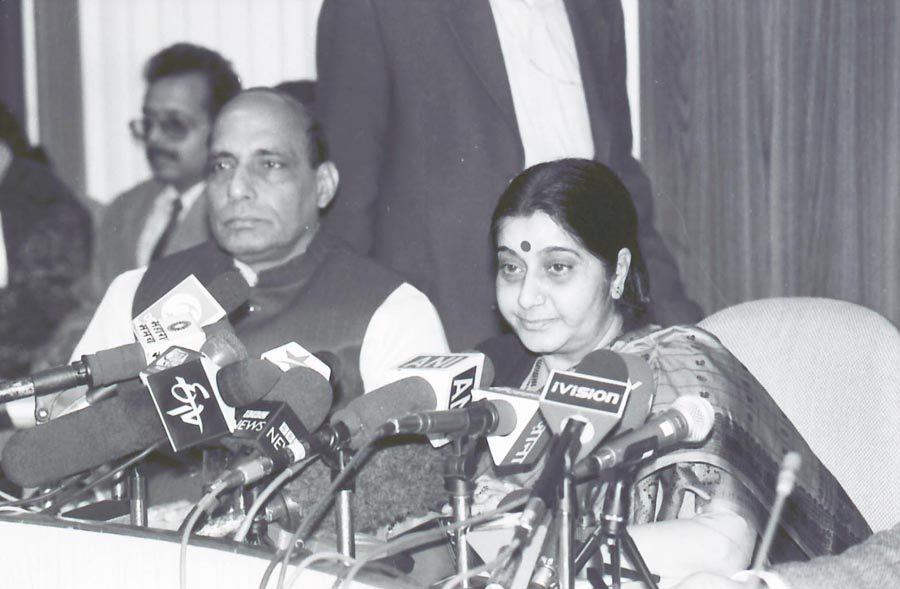
The Union Minister for Health and Family Welfare Smt. Sushma Swaraj addressing the Press on "Birds flu" in New Delhi on 29 January 2004

She was Minister of Health, Family Welfare and Parliamentary Affairs from January 2003 until May 2004, when the National Democratic Alliance Government lost the general election.

As Union Health Minister, she set up six All India Institute of Medical Sciences at Bhopal (MP), Bhubaneshwar (Odisha), Jodhpur (Rajasthan), Patna (Bihar), Raipur (Chhattisgarh) and Rishikesh (Uttrakhand).

Swaraj was re-elected to the Rajya Sabha for a third term in April 2006 from Madhya Pradesh state. She served as the Deputy leader of Opposition in Rajya Sabha until April 2009.

=== Leader of Opposition, Lok Sabha (2009–2014) ===
She won the 2009 election for the 15th Lok Sabha from the Vidisha Lok Sabha constituency in Madhya Pradesh by the highest margin of over 400,000 votes. Sushma Swaraj became Leader of Opposition in the 15th Lok Sabha in place of Lal Krishna Advani on 21 December 2009, and retained this position until May 2014 when, in the 2014 Indian general election, her party won a major victory.

== Minister of External Affairs (2014–2019) ==
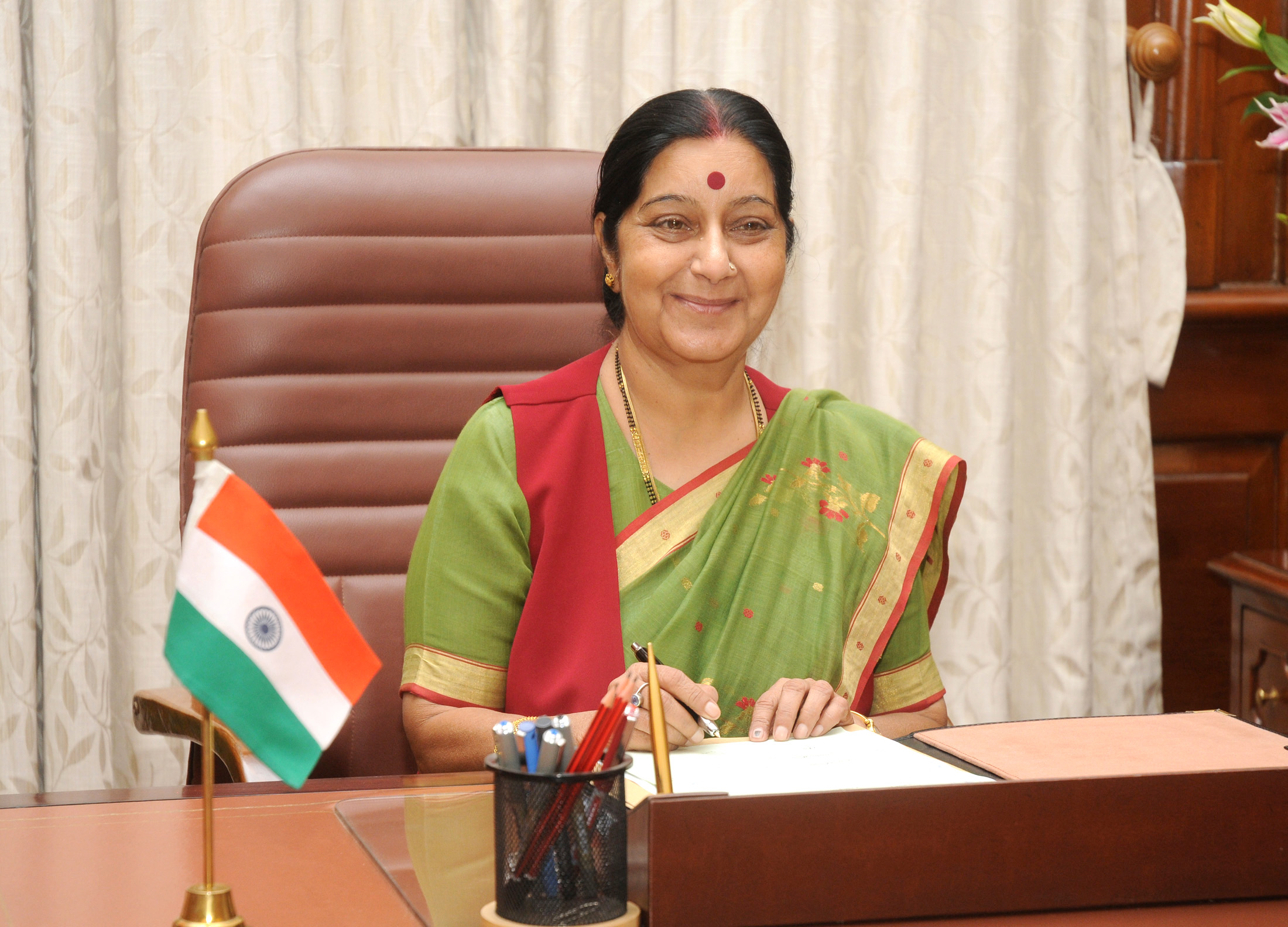
Sushma Swaraj taking charge as the Union Minister for External Affairs, in New Delhi on 28 May 2014

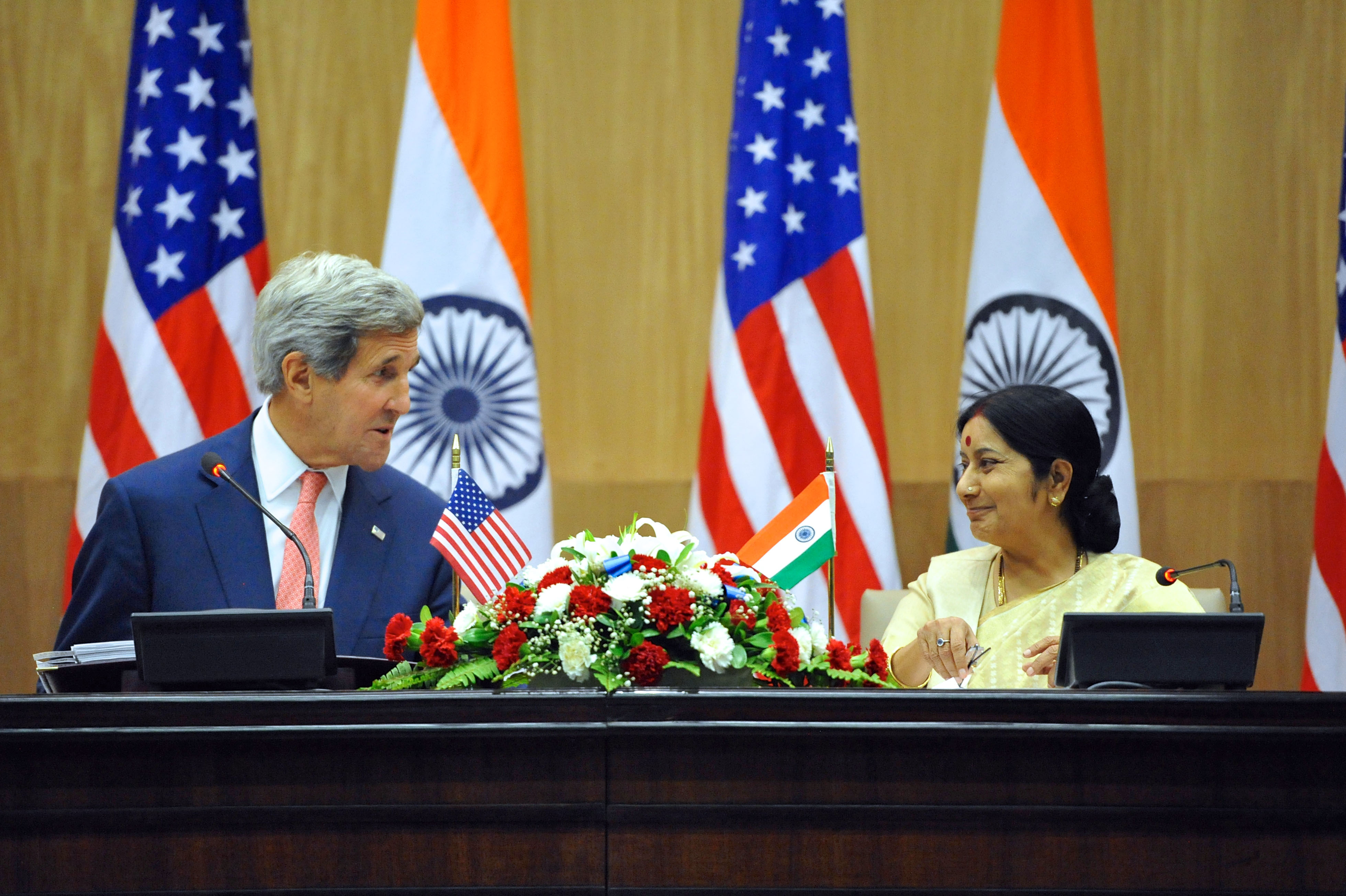
Secretary of State John Kerry and Sushma Swaraj address reporters during news conference following strategic dialogue

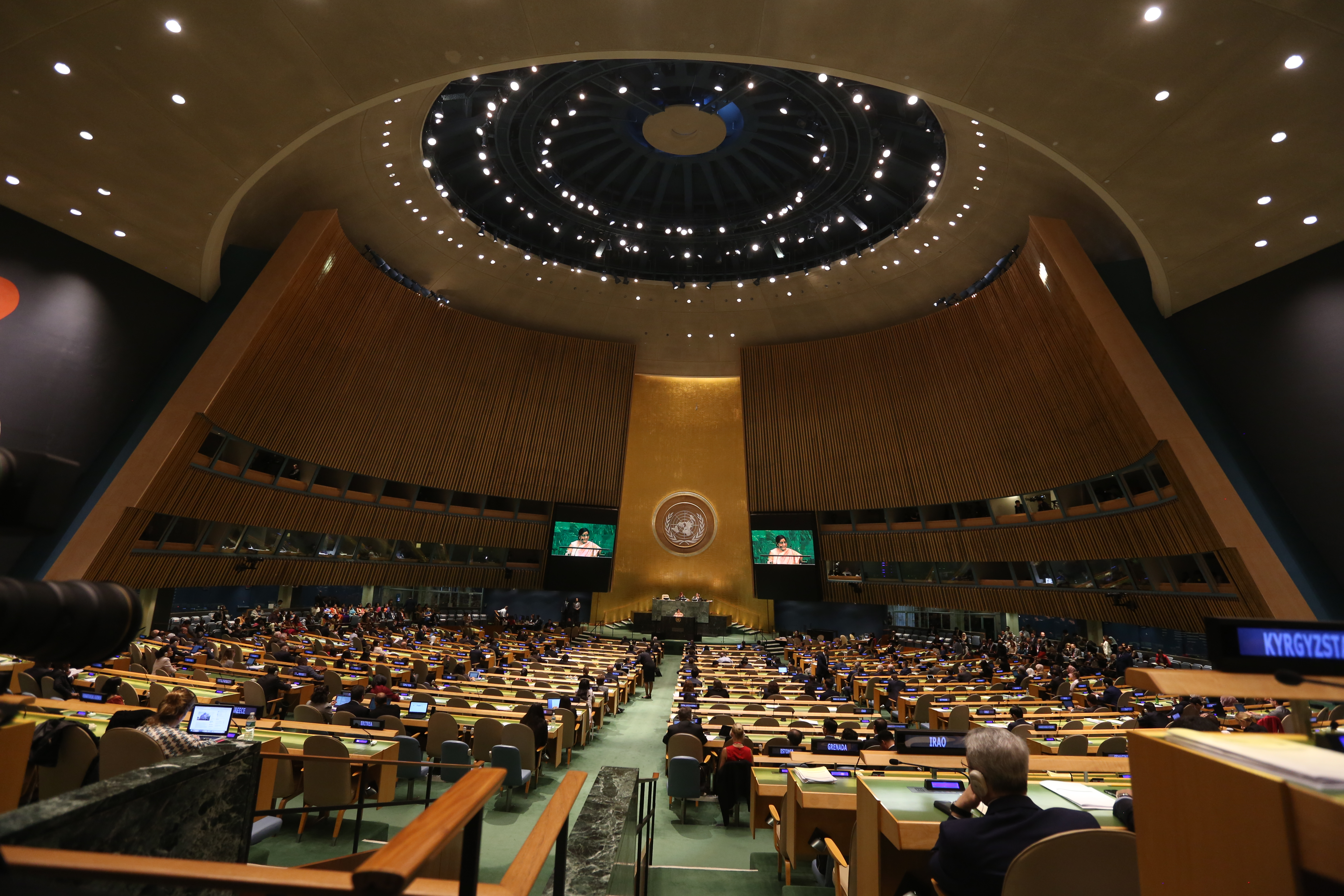
Sushma Swaraj addressing at 73rd United Nations General Assembly in 2018

Swaraj had served as the Indian Minister of External Affairs under Prime Minister Narendra Modi from May 2014 to May 2019. She was responsible for implementing the foreign policy of Narendra Modi. She was only the second woman to hold this position after Indira Gandhi.

As Minister of External Affairs of the NDA government, Swaraj issued an NOC against a specific query raised by the UK government about the Indo-UK bilateral relationship if the UK granted permission to Lalit Modi, an Indian fugitive in a cricket scandal who had been staying in Britain since 2010, to attend his wife's surgery in Portugal. She conveyed to the British High Commissioner that they should examine Modi's request as per their rules and wrote "if the British government chooses to give travel documents to Lalit Modi -– that will not spoil our bilateral relations". However, some people mentioned this incident as Swaraj helping Lalit Modi in the travel visa process.

On 12 August 2015, the leader of the Indian National Congress, Mallikarjun Kharge, moved an Adjournment Motion in the lower house seeking the resignation of Sushma Swaraj due to her alleged conduct in this regard. Initially, the motion was rejected by the Speaker, but it was accepted on Swaraj's insistence. Intervening in the motion, Swaraj clarified that Lalit Modi's right of residency was not cancelled, since the Enforcement Directorate did not file an extradition request. The Adjournment Motion was subsequently rejected with a voice vote. Sushma Swaraj was heavily criticised in 2014 when she urged Prime Minister Modi to declare the Bhagavad Gita as the national book of India.

As External Affairs Minister, she played a pivotal role in bringing back the then 23-year-old hearing and speech-impaired Indian girl named Gita who was stranded in Pakistan for 15 years.

In December 2015, the Norwegian government took custody of an Indian origin child from his parents citing child abuse. Swaraj, then the External Affairs Minister, stepped in after the mother of the child formally requested help from Indian government.

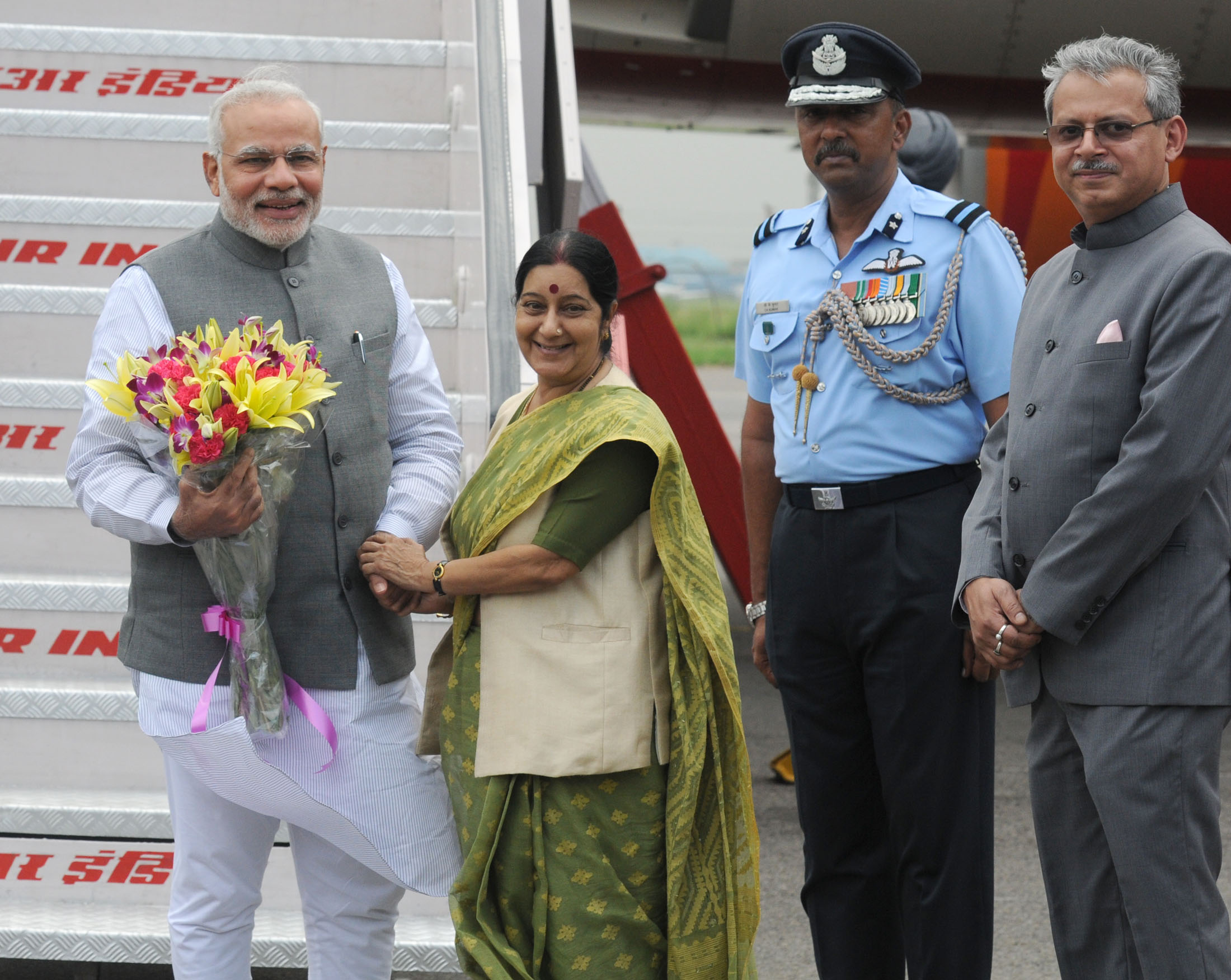
Swaraj with Prime Minister Narendra Modi

== Distinctions and records ==
In 1977, she became the youngest ever Cabinet Minister in the Government of Haryana at 25 years of age. In 1979, she became State President of Janata Party, Haryana State at the young age of 27. Sushma Swaraj was the first female Spokesperson of a national political party in India. She has many firsts to her credit as BJP's first female Chief Minister, Union Cabinet Minister, general secretary, Spokesperson, Leader of Opposition and Minister of External Affairs.She was the second female chief minister after Tamil Nadu's V. N. Janaki who did not the member of the legislature. She is the Indian Parliament's first and the only female MP honoured with the Outstanding Parliamentarian Award. She has contested 11 direct elections from four states. She has served as the President of the Hindi Sahitya Sammelan in Haryana for four years.

In February 2016, during the International Roma Conference, then Indian Minister of External Affairs, Sushma Swaraj stated that the people of the Roma community were children of India. The conference ended with a recommendation to the government of India to recognise the Roma community spread across 30 countries as a part of the Indian diaspora.

On 19 February 2019 Swaraj accepted the prestigious Grand Cross of Order of Civil Merit, which was conferred by the Spanish government in recognition of India's support in evacuating its citizens from Nepal during the earthquake in 2015.

== Elections Contested ==
=== Lok Sabha ===
| Year | Constituency | Party | Votes | % | Opponent | Opponent Party | Opponent Votes | % | Result | Margin | % |
|---|---|---|---|---|---|---|---|---|---|---|---|
| 1996 | South Delhi | BJP | 2,94,570 | 54.69 | Kapil Sibal | INC | 1,80,564 | 33.52 | Won | 1,14,006 | 21.17 |
| 1998 | South Delhi | BJP | 3,31,756 | 58.24 | Ajay Maken | INC | 2,15,043 | 37.75 | Won | 1,16,713 | 20.49 |
| 1999 | Bellary | BJP | 3,58,550 | 44.70 | Sonia Gandhi | INC | 4,14,650 | 51.70 | Lost | -56,100 | -7.00 |
| 2009 | Vidisha | BJP | 4,38,235 | 78.80 | Ch. Munavver Salim | SP | 48,391 | 8.70 | Won | 3,89,844 | 70.10 |
| 2014 | Vidisha | BJP | 7,14,348 | 66.55 | Lakshman Singh | INC | 3,03,650 | 28.29 | Won | 4,10,698 | 38.26 |

=== Rajya Sabha ===
| Position | Party | Constituency | From | To | Tenure |
|---|---|---|---|---|---|
| Member of Parliament, Rajya Sabha (1st Term) | BJP | Haryana | 10 April 1990 | 9 April 1996 | 5 years, 365 days |
| Member of Parliament, Rajya Sabha (2nd Term) | BJP | Uttar Pradesh | 3 April 2000 | 8 November 2000 | 219 days |
| Member of Parliament, Rajya Sabha (2nd Term) | BJP | Uttarakhand | 9 November 2000 | 2 April 2006 | 5 years, 144 days |
| Member of Parliament, Rajya Sabha (3rd Term) | BJP | Madhya Pradesh | 3 April 2006 | 30 May 2009 | 3 years, 57 days |

== Personal life ==
During the times of the Emergency, on 13 July 1975, Sushma Sharma married Swaraj Kaushal, a peer and fellow advocate at the Supreme Court of India. The Emergency movement brought the couple together, who then teamed up for the defence of the socialist leader George Fernandes. Swaraj Kaushal, a senior advocate of Supreme Court of India and a criminal lawyer, also served as Governor of Mizoram from 1990 to 1993. He was a member of parliament from 1998 to 2004.

The couple has a daughter, Bansuri, who is a graduate from Oxford University and a Barrister at Law from Inner Temple. Bansuri was elected to the Lok Sabha on 2024 from New Delhi constituency.

Sushma Swaraj's sister Vandana Sharma is an associate professor of political science in a government college for girls in Haryana. Their brother Dr. Gulshan Sharma is an Ayurveda doctor based in Ambala.

On 10 December 2015 she underwent a kidney transplant at AIIMS, Delhi with the organ being harvested from a living unrelated donor. The surgery was reported to be successful.

== Death ==
On 6 August 2019, Sushma Swaraj reportedly suffered a heart attack in the evening after which she was rushed to AIIMS New Delhi, where she later died of a cardiac arrest. She was cremated the next day with full state honours at the Lodhi crematorium in Delhi.

== Positions held ==
Positions Held
| Position | Duration |
|---|---|
| Minister of External Affairs | 16 Feb. 2016 - 29 May 2019 |
| Minister of External Affairs & Overseas Indian Affairs | 27 May 2014 - 16 Feb. 2016 |
| Member, 16th Lok Sabha | Re-elected in May 2014 (4th term) |
| Leader of Opposition, Lok Sabha | |
| Leader, BJP Parliamentary Party, Lok Sabha | 21 Dec. 2009 |
| Member, General Purpose Committee | 19 Oct. 2009 |
| Member, Committee on Ethics | 7 Oct. 2009 |
| Member, Rules Committee | 23 Sep. 2009 |
| Chairperson, Standing Committee on External Affairs | 31 Aug. 2009 - 1 Jan. 2010 |
| Member, 15th Lok Sabha | Re-elected in 2009 (3rd term) |
| Member, House Committee, Rajya Sabha | May 2008 - 2009 |
| Member, Parliamentary Forum on Population and Public Health | May 2006 - 2009 |
| Member, Rajya Sabha | Re-elected in Apr. 2006 (3rd term) |
| Member, Consultative Committee, Ministry of Defence | Oct. 2004 - 2009 |
| Member, Ethics Committee, Rajya Sabha | Sep. 2004 - 2009 |
| Member, General Purposes Committee, Rajya Sabha | |
| Member, Business Advisory Committee, Rajya Sabha | |
| Chairperson, Standing Committee on Home Affairs | Aug. 2004 - 2009 |
| Union Cabinet Minister, Health and Family Welfare and Parliamentary Affairs | 29 Jan. 2003 - 22 May 2004 |
| Union Cabinet Minister, Information and Broadcasting | 30 Sep. 2000 - 29 Jan. 2003 |
| Member, Rajya Sabha | Re-elected in Apr. 2000 (2nd term) |
| Chief Minister, N.C.T. of Delhi | 13 Oct. - 3 Dec. 1998 |
| Union Cabinet Minister, Information and Broadcasting and Telecommunications (Additional Charge) | 19 Mar. - 12 Oct. 1998 |
| Member, 12th Lok Sabha | Re-elected in 1998 (2nd term) |
| Member, Committee of Privileges | |
| Chairperson, Sub-Committee on Upgradation and Modernisation of Naval Fleet | |
| Member, Standing Committee on Defence | 1996–98 |
| Union Cabinet Minister, Information and Broadcasting | 16 May - 1 Jun. 1996 |
| Member, 11th Lok Sabha | Elected in 1996 |
| Chairperson, Committee on Petitions, Rajya Sabha | 1994–96 |
| Member, Committee on Government Assurances, Rajya Sabha | |
| Chairperson, Joint Committee on Catering | 1992–94 |
| Member, Rajya Sabha | Elected in 1990 |
| Cabinet Minister, Education, Food and Civil Supplies, Govt. of Haryana | 1987–90 |
| Cabinet Minister, Labour and Employment, Govt. of Haryana | 1977–79 |
| Member, Haryana Legislative Assembly | 1977-82 and 1987-90 (two terms) |

== Awards and honours ==
=== National honours ===
- India:
  - Padma Vibhushan (2020, posthumous)

=== Foreign honours ===
- Spain:
  - Order of Civil Merit, Grand Cross (19 February 2019)

=== Posthumous honours ===
- In 2020, Government of India renamed Foreign Service Institute of India after her as Sushma Swaraj Institute of Foreign Service.
- In 2020, Government of India renamed Pravasi Bharatiya Kendra after her as Sushma Swaraj Bhawan.
- The bus station of Ambala City is named after her in 2020.

== See also ==
- List of current foreign ministers

== Notes ==
Lok Sabha
| Preceded by Madan Lal Khurana | Member of Parliament for South Delhi; 1996–1999 | Succeeded by Vijay Kumar Malhotra |
| Preceded by Rampal Singh | Member of Parliament for Vidisha; 2009–2019 | Succeeded by Ramakant Bhargava |
Political offices
| Preceded by Sahib Singh Verma | Chief Minister of Delhi; 1998–1998 | Succeeded by Sheila Dikshit |
| Preceded by Arun Jaitley | Minister of Information and Broadcasting; 2000–2003 | Succeeded by Ravi Shankar Prasad |
| Preceded by C. P. Thakur | Minister of Health and Family Welfare; 2003–2004 | Succeeded by Anbumani Ramadoss |
| Preceded by Pramod Mahajan | Minister of Parliamentary Affairs; 2003–2004 | Succeeded by Ghulam Nabi Azad |
| Preceded by L. K. Advani | Leader of the Opposition in the Lok Sabha; 2009–2014 | Vacant |
| Preceded by Salman Khurshid | Minister of External Affairs; 2014–2019 | Succeeded by Subrahmanyam Jaishankar |
| Preceded by Vayalar Ravi | Minister of Overseas Indian Affairs; 2014–2016 | Position abolished |
