= Bansuri Swaraj =

Member of Parliament, Lok Sabha

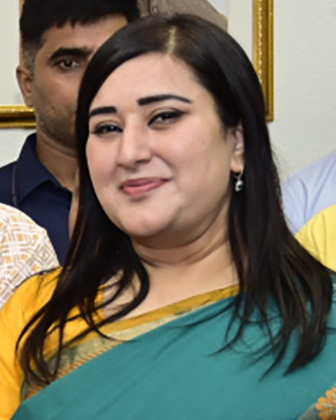

Member of Parliament, Lok Sabha
- Incumbent
- Assumed office 4 June 2024
- Preceded by: Meenakshi Lekhi
- Constituency: New Delhi

Personal details
- Born: 3 January 1984 (age 42) New Delhi, India
- Party: Bharatiya Janata Party
- Parent(s): Sushma Swaraj (mother); Swaraj Kaushal (father)
- Education: St. Catherine's College, University of Oxford (M.St.); Inner Temple (Barrister)
- Occupation: Advocate; politician

Bansuri Swaraj (born 3 January 1984) is an Indian lawyer and politician. She is a member of Lok Sabha from New Delhi. Bansuri Swaraj is the daughter of former Union Minister Sushma Swaraj and former Governor of Mizoram Swaraj Kaushal.

== Education ==
Bansuri Swaraj is a graduate of the University of Warwick and of Oxford University and a barrister-at-law from Inner Temple. She has completed her Master of Studies from St. Catherine's College, Oxford.

== Political career ==
Swaraj won her first election in 2024 as a Member of Parliament 18th Lok Sabha defeating her nearest rival candidate Somnath Bharti with a margin of 78,370 votes.
