= Second Devi Lal ministry =

Government of Haryana from 1987 to 1989

- Ministry of Haryana
- Date formed: 17 July 1987
- Date dissolved: 2 December 1989

People and organisations
- Chief Minister: Devi Lal
- Deputy Chief Minister: Banarsi Das Gupta; Mangal Sein
- Member parties: Janata Dal

History
- Predecessor: Bansi Lal
- Successor: Om Prakash Chautala

The Second Devi Lal ministry was the Council of Ministers in Haryana headed by Devi Lal, who served as Chief Minister of Haryana for the second time from 17 July 1987 to 2 December 1989. The following is the list of ministers in his second ministry:

== Council of ministers ==
Name	Office	Portfolio	Took office	Left office
Devi Lal	Chief Minister	—	17 July 1987	2 December 1989
Banarsi Das Gupta	Deputy Chief Minister	—	17 July 1987	2 December 1989
Dr. Mangal Sein	Deputy Chief Minister	—	17 July 1987	2 December 1989
Verender Singh	Cabinet Minister	Irrigation and Power	17 July 1987	2 December 1989
Dr. Kirpa Ram Punia	Cabinet Minister	Industries	17 July 1987	2 December 1989
Suraj Bhan	Cabinet Minister	Revenue	17 July 1987	2 December 1989
Sampat Singh	Cabinet Minister	Home	17 July 1987	2 December 1989
Hukam Singh	Cabinet Minister	Development	17 July 1987	2 December 1989
Ram Bilas Sharma	Cabinet Minister	Public Health	17 July 1987	2 December 1989
Kamla Verma	Cabinet Minister	Health and Ayurveda	17 July 1987	2 December 1989
Luxmi Narain	Cabinet Minister	Industrial Training	17 July 1987	2 December 1989
Om Parkash Bhardwaj	Cabinet Minister	Public Works	17 July 1987	2 December 1989
Sushma Swaraj	Cabinet Minister	Education	17 July 1987	2 December 1989
Rao Ram Narain	Cabinet Minister	Excise and Taxation	17 July 1987	2 December 1989
Parma Nand	Cabinet Minister	Forests and Wild Life Preservation	17 July 1987	2 December 1989
Subhash Chand Katyal	Cabinet Minister	Social Welfare	17 July 1987	2 December 1989
Ranjit Singh Chautala	Cabinet Minister	Agriculture	17 July 1987	2 December 1989
Dr. Maha Singh	Cabinet Minister	Tourism	17 July 1987	2 December 1989
Ved Singh Malik	Cabinet Minister	Transport	17 July 1987	2 December 1989
Dr. Raghuvir Singh	Minister of State	Cooperation	17 July 1987	2 December 1989
Dharambir	Minister of State	Transport	17 July 1987	2 December 1989
Balbir Singh	Minister of State	Labour and Employment	17 July 1987	2 December 1989
Azmat Khan	Minister of State	Animal Husbandry	17 July 1987	2 December 1989
Sita Ram Singla	Minister of State	Sports and Cultural Affairs	17 July 1987	2 December 1989
Nar Singh	Minister of State	Food and Supplies	17 July 1987	2 December 1989
Hari Singh	Minister of State	Civil Aviation	17 July 1987	2 December 1989
Manphool Singh	Minister of State	Printing and Stationery	17 July 1987	2 December 1989
Hasan Mohammad	Minister of State	Wakf	17 July 1987	2 December 1989
Lachhman Singh	Minister of State	Housing	17 July 1987	2 December 1989
Sachdev	Minister of State	Dairy Development	17 July 1987	2 December 1989

== See also ==
- First Devi Lal ministry (1977–1979)
