= Swaraj Kaushal =

Indian criminal lawyer (1952–2025)

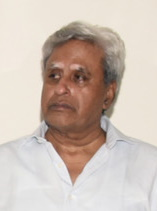
- Kaushal in 2019

3rd Governor of Mizoram
- In office 8 February 1990 – 9 February 1993
- Chief Minister: Lal Thanhawla
- Preceded by: Williamson A. Sangma
- Succeeded by: Paty Ripple Kyndiah

Member of Parliament, Rajya Sabha
- In office 1998–2004
- Constituency: Haryana

Advocate General of Mizoram
- In office 1987–1990

Personal details
- Born: 12 July 1952 Solan, Patiala and East Punjab States Union, India (present-day Himachal Pradesh)
- Died: 4 December 2025 (aged 73) New Delhi, Delhi, India
- Party: Haryana Vikas Party
- Spouse: Sushma Swaraj (m. 1975; died 2019)
- Children: Bansuri Swaraj (daughter)
- Education: Delhi University
- Occupation: Lawyer; politician

Swaraj Kaushal (12 July 1952 – 4 December 2025) was an Indian criminal lawyer practising in New Delhi. He was designated as a senior advocate by the Supreme Court of India at age 34, and he became the Governor of Mizoram at the age of 37, serving between 1990 and 1993.

== Early life ==
Swaraj Kaushal was born to Madan Lal and Lajyawati on 12 July 1952 in Solan, Patiala and East Punjab States Union (present-day Himachal Pradesh). He received his Bachelor of Arts degree from D.A.V. School, Chandigarh and completed LLB from Faculty of Laws, Panjab University, Chandigarh.

== Career ==
During the Emergency of 1975–77, he defended socialist leader George Fernandes in the famous Baroda dynamite case. He secured release of the underground Mizo leader, Laldenga, in the conspiracy trial in 1979. Thereafter, he was the constitutional adviser to the underground Mizo National Front during negotiations with the Government of India. Many years of negotiations resulted in the signing of the Mizoram Peace Accord, which he helped write on 30 June 1986, which ended 20 years of insurgency. He was appointed the first Advocate General of Mizoram, the state's premier legal officer in 1987 at the age of 34. He was an expert on India's northeast region and its insurgency problem.

He was designated as a senior advocate by the Supreme Court of India on 20 December 1986 at the age of 34, a notable achievement in the legal profession.

== Governor of Mizoram ==
He was the Governor of Mizoram from 8 February 1990 to 9 February 1993.

== Member of Parliament ==
He was a member of parliament between 1998 and 2004 as a member of the Haryana Vikas Party, representing the state of Haryana. During 1998-99 and 2000–2004, he was a member of Rajya Sabha.

== Personal life and death ==
Kaushal married Sushma Swaraj on 13 July 1975. Their only child, Bansuri Swaraj, is a graduate from Oxford University and a barrister from Inner Temple. On 6 August 2019, Sushma Swaraj died of a cardiac arrest at AIIMS Delhi, following a heart attack that evening.

On the afternoon of 4 December 2025, Kaushal complained of chest pain, after which he was brought to AIIMS Delhi, where he later died. He was 73. His last rites were performed the same day at the Lodhi Road crematorium.
