= First Devi Lal ministry =

Government of Haryana from 1977 to 1979

- Ministry of Haryana
- Date formed: 21 June 1977
- Date dissolved: 28 June 1979

People and organisations
- Chief Minister: Devi Lal
- Member parties: Janata Party

The First Devi Lal ministry was the Council of Ministers in Haryana headed by Devi Lal, who served as Chief Minister of Haryana from 21 June 1977 to 28 June 1979. The ministry was formed after the Janata Party came to power in the state. The following is the list of ministers in his first ministry:

== Council of ministers ==
Name	Office	Portfolio	Took office	Left office
Devi Lal	Chief Minister	—	21 June 1977	28 June 1979
Mangal Sein	Minister	Industries	21 June 1977	28 June 1979
Ran Singh	Minister	Agriculture	21 June 1977	28 June 1979
Mool Chand Jain	Minister	Finance	21 June 1977	28 June 1979
Verander Singh	Minister	Irrigation and Power	21 June 1977	28 June 1979
Bhajan Lal	Minister	Cooperation and Dairy Development	21 June 1977	28 June 1979
Prit Singh	Minister	Revenue	21 June 1977	28 June 1979
Bir Singh	Minister	Development	21 June 1977	28 June 1979
Lachhman Singh	Minister	Public Works	21 June 1977	28 June 1979
Kamla Verma	Minister	Health; Printing and Stationery	21 June 1977	28 June 1979
Ram Lal Wadhwa	Minister	Local Government	21 June 1977	28 June 1979
Hira Nand	Minister	Education	21 June 1977	28 June 1979
Mehar Singh Rathi	Minister	Jails; Cultural Affairs	21 June 1977	28 June 1979
Sher Singh	Minister	Excise and Taxation	21 June 1977	28 June 1979
Gajraj Bahadur Nagar	Minister	Food and Supplies	21 June 1977	28 June 1979
Sardar Khan	Deputy Minister	Home Affairs	21 June 1977	28 June 1979

== See also ==
- Second Devi Lal ministry (1987–1989)
