= Finnair Flight 915 =

1987 alleged attempted missile attack over Norway

Coordinates: 79°49′N 023°00′E

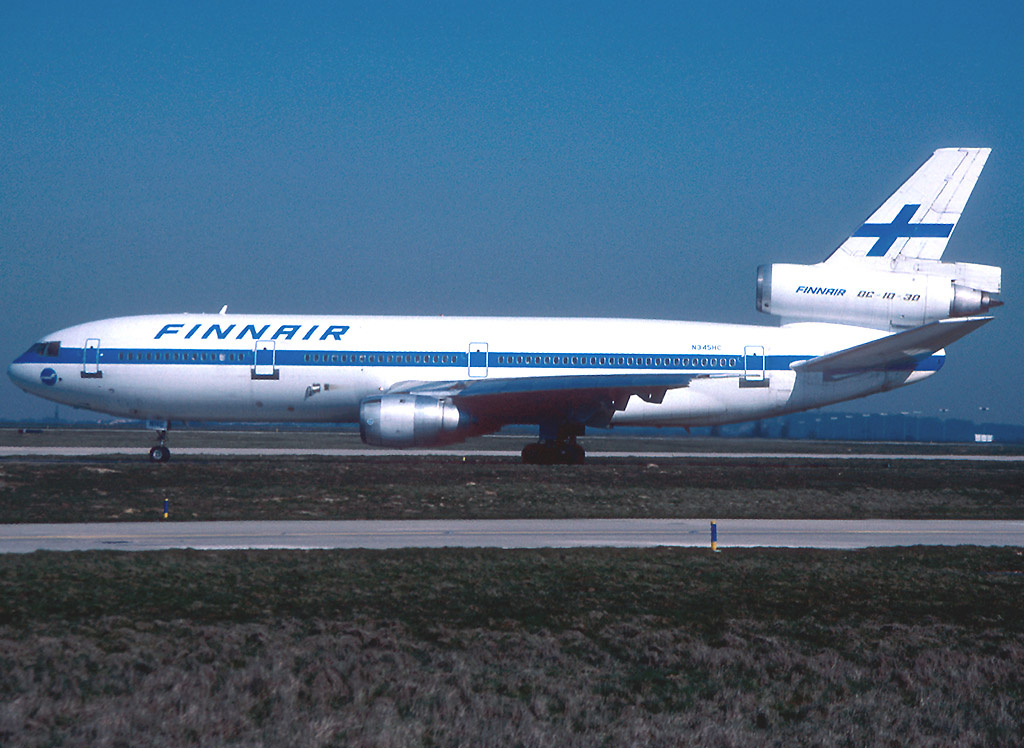
- The Finnair McDonnell Douglas DC-10 aircraft involved in the incident

Incident
- Date: 23 December 1987
- Summary: Alleged attempted missile attack, near miss
- Site: Edgeøya, Svalbard, Norway

Aircraft
- Aircraft type: McDonnell-Douglas DC-10-30ER
- Operator: Finnair
- Registration: OH-LHC / N345HC
- Flight origin: Narita International Airport, Tokyo, Japan
- Destination: Helsinki-Vantaa Airport, Vantaa, Finland
- Occupants: 219
- Passengers: 201
- Crew: 18
- Fatalities: 0
- Survivors: 219

Finnair Flight 915 (AY915) was a scheduled flight by Finnair from Tokyo, Japan, over the North Pole to Helsinki, Finland, on 23 December 1987. In 2014, Finnish media reported a claim by two of the flight's pilots that the Soviet Union had fired a missile at the aircraft, which exploded less than 30 seconds before impact. The allegations came out only in September 2014, when Helsingin Sanomat, the leading Finnish daily newspaper, published an extensive article on the matter. The Finnish Broadcasting Corporation YLE reported on the article on the Internet the same day.

When the matter came out, it caused outrage in Finland among those politicians and civil servants to whom it should have been reported at the time, and it was widely publicised and commented upon in the Finnish media, amidst allegations of Finlandization.

The alleged incident has been compared to other similar incidents involving the Soviet Union, such as the Aero Kaleva in 1940, Aeroflot Flight 902 in 1962, Korean Air Lines Flight 902 in 1978, and Korean Air Lines Flight 007 in 1983. Co-captain Kaukiainen said that the Finnair pilots decided to speak out on the matter after Malaysia Airlines Flight 17 had been shot down in Ukraine on 17 July 2014.

== Background ==
Finnair was the first airline in the world to fly non-stop scheduled flights between Europe and Japan starting in 1983. The aircraft they used was McDonnell Douglas DC-10-30ERs, which had extra fuel tanks fitted in the cargo space that enabled the plane to take on 24,000 litres (5,300 imp gal; 6,300 US gal) of additional fuel. This made it possible to cover the 5,413 nautical miles (10,025 km; 6,229 mi) from Tokyo to Helsinki on a non-stop flight that lasted 13 hours. The flight was carried out in international air space, over the North Pole, since the Soviet Union had demanded extra payments for flights over its territory in Siberia, in addition to ordinary navigation fees. The range of the aircraft of other western airlines did not allow for such flights, and they landed in Anchorage, Alaska, for refuelling. Japanese airlines did not fly non-stop over Siberia, as they thought that the Soviet Union would have demanded bilateral flight rights in return.

== Flight ==
The aircraft involved was a DC-10-30/ER leased to Finnair and flying in Finnair livery. It was originally registered in Finland with the registration OH-LHC, but it was mostly known for its re-registration in the United States as N345HC. It was built and delivered to Finnair in 1981. The same aircraft was later painted with Moomin characters. It was used by Finnair between 1981 and 1995, although on two occasions in the 1990s it was leased to Garuda Indonesia.

The Finnair aircraft had taken off from Tokyo's Narita International Airport almost on schedule, around 10 a.m. Japanese time (3 a.m. Finnish time) on 23 December 1987, and it carried 201 passengers, four pilots, and 12 Finnish and 2 Japanese flight attendants. The cruising altitude was 10,600 m (34,800 ft).

The flight proceeded north from Tokyo to Bering Strait and on over the North Pole and then with the aid of an inertial navigation system south toward Svalbard and on toward Helsinki. Before the Bering Strait, the plane crossed the International Date Line over the Aleutian Islands and thus for some time flew during the previous day, 22 December.

== Events ==
According to the pilots' 2014 report of the incident, when the aircraft was over the Edgeøya island of Svalbard, between 1 and 2 p.m. Finnish time, the assistant pilot in command Esko Kaukiainen and assistant first officer Markku Soininen saw a rocket approaching the aircraft ahead, at 30 degrees to the left of the flight path of the plane. The pilot in command and the first officer were having a rest at the time. Visibility was good, and the pilots followed the flight of the rocket for more than half a minute. At first, they thought it was a Soviet weather rocket on its way to the troposphere, but when it reached the cruising altitude of the aircraft, it turned and came straight at it. Then the rocket exploded. It was clear to the pilots that the rocket had been locked to its target, the Finnair aircraft.

The inertial navigation system equipment of the aircraft allowed the crew to determine their position. After the explosion, Kaukiainen started a stopwatch. 60 to 80 seconds later the aircraft came to the dust cloud left by the explosion. With the cruising speed of the aircraft being 900 km/h (560 mph) and that of the missile at least 1,800 km/h (1,100 mph), the pilots calculated that the explosion had taken place only about 20 seconds before impact. The pilots watched as the hull of the missile fell down towards the sea in a spirallike motion.

The pilot in command came to the cockpit later and took care of the landing at about 4 p.m. Finnish time. The pilots who had been in the cockpit during the events reported orally to him.

== Conjectures about the events ==
The pilots had no doubt the missile had come from somewhere in the Soviet Union. They surmised that it had been fired from the Kola Peninsula or from a submarine. When they talked to Helsingin Sanomat in 2014, they said they thought it had been some kind of exercise. They thought that either things had gone as planned in the exercise, or then they had gone wrong. In case it had gone according to plan, it meant that the Finnair aircraft had been used for target practice. One possibility they had considered was that it was a missile gone astray, as had been the case three years previously with the so-called Lake Inari missile incident in the north of Finland.

Professor Stefan Forss Ph.D. from the Strategic and Defence Studies of the National Defence University of Finland, a specialist in the technology of war, especially that of nuclear weapons systems, pointed out that missile could not have been a conventional ground-launched ballistic or cruise missiles with intermediate range, which were due to be eliminated as a result of Intermediate-Range Nuclear Forces or INF Treaty ratified between the United States and the Soviet Union ratified in early 1987, as the elimination of these missiles began only in late July the following year.

Turun Sanomat, a daily newspaper published in Turku, Finland, interviewed Colonel Ahti Lappi (retired), who worked from 1988 to 1996 as the anti-aircraft inspector of the Finnish Defence Forces, in the highest position in this branch of the defence forces. Lappi stated the following things:

- The path of the missile, in particular the fact that it changed its course, suggests a surface-to-air missile. Ballistic missiles do not have the ability to change their courses at an altitude exceeding 10,000 metres (33,000 ft). He says he believes the pilots' observations were accurate.
- Soviet territories, those of Novaya Zemlya and the Kola Peninsula, were too far away from Svalbard even for the heaviest anti-aircraft weapons of the time. Thus Lappi was inclined to believe that the missile was fired from a surface vessel.

According to Lappi, the explosion of the missile in mid-air is a mystery. He does not remember any missile from the 1980s that could have been detonated from the ground with remote control. Surface-to-air missiles have self-destruction systems, which detonate the charge automatically before the end of the trajectory of the missile (possibly meaning before they hit the ground). Lappi thought that the missile could have been a S-125 Pechora, which within NATO is called SA-3 Goa, of which there is a version that is used on surface vessels. It was used by the Soviet Union and as of 2014 was still being used in dozens of countries. Its ceiling is 17 kilometres (11 mi; 9.2 nmi) and it has a range of 27 kilometres (17 mi; 15 nmi).

The huge dust cloud, however, speaks against a Pechora missile, in Lappi's opinion. The 60 kilograms (130 lb) charge of the missile does not produce an explosion that would be spectacular.

== Lack of reports ==
The pilots had agreed that the pilot in command would file a report after the flight, as it was his duty to report on such matters. Kaukiainen reminded him of this on two occasions in the weeks following the alleged incident. However, it seems the pilot in command never did do it, due in part to the fact that the celebration of Christmas interfered with the process. Kaukiainen also speculated that perhaps he did not want to write it, as he had not witnessed the incident himself, and it would have been difficult for him to argue that it had taken place.

When the Helsingin Sanomat article came out in 2014, he had already died. Lauri J. Laine, retired director of flights for Finnair at the time, confirmed that no report was ever written about the incident.

However, the events had been discussed within Finnair, especially in pilot training. One Finnair official from the flight's direction team, who chose to remain anonymous, told Helsingin Sanomat that he had heard about the incident at the time: "It was talked about. Other pilots also said that they saw explosions on that particular route. Were they perhaps missile tests?" Kaukiainen also related the incident to at least one official within the Finnish Civil Aviation Administration, which in 2014 is called Finavia. But it turned out that there was little interest in the matter within the Finnish government, because "people were so damned Finlandized back then, especially within the Finnish Government". In 2014 the Finnish Transport Safety Agency (TraFi) had no knowledge of the matter, and reports or flight log books for 1987 no longer existed.

The co-captain of the flight said in an interview with HSTV, a video service of Helsingin Sanomat that he thought of the incident again after Malaysia Airlines Flight 17 had been shot down in Ukraine on 17 July 2014. The surviving pilots, both of whom witnessed the missile and its explosion from the cockpit, then decided to speak about the incident in public.

Pekka Henttu, director of the aviation department at TraFi, said that today such an incident would not be hushed. It is likely that the authorities and the top executives of the airline would have been informed of it even before the plane lands.

== Reactions by former ministers and the head of the Finnish Security Intelligence Service ==
Pekka Vennamo, who was the Minister of Transport in 1987, as well as Pertti Salolainen, who was the Minister of Foreign Trade at the time, only heard about the incident when they read the Helsingin Sanomat article in September 2014. The same was the case with Seppo Tiitinen, Director of the Finnish Security Intelligence Service at the time. Tiitinen said that "the matter would absolutely been of interest within the Security Intelligence Service … Information concerning an incident like this should have been passed on automatically from civil servants in the aviation branch to the authorities — then just as now. … It would have been passed on to the top people in the government, and they would have decided whether some kind of action would have been required."

Salolainen is said to have been enraged when he read about the incident. He considers the incident to have been "outrageous", and he continued saying that "it would not have been civilized behaviour, it would have been low-life military gangsterism, if the description of the events is accurate." Salolainen said that even in 2014 information is withheld from the Parliament of Finland and the ministers of the government "in a manner that is deplorable." Vennamo stated that "it is a heinous offence if the Finnair plane had indeed been used for target practice."

== See also ==
- List of airliner shootdown incidents
