= Nahan =

Town in Himachal Pradesh, India

- Town
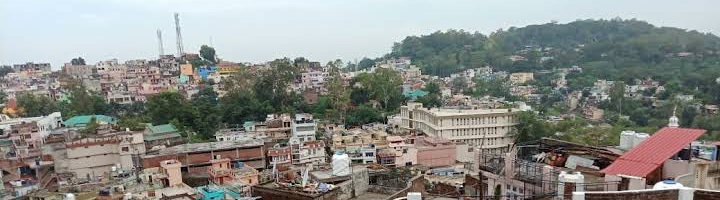
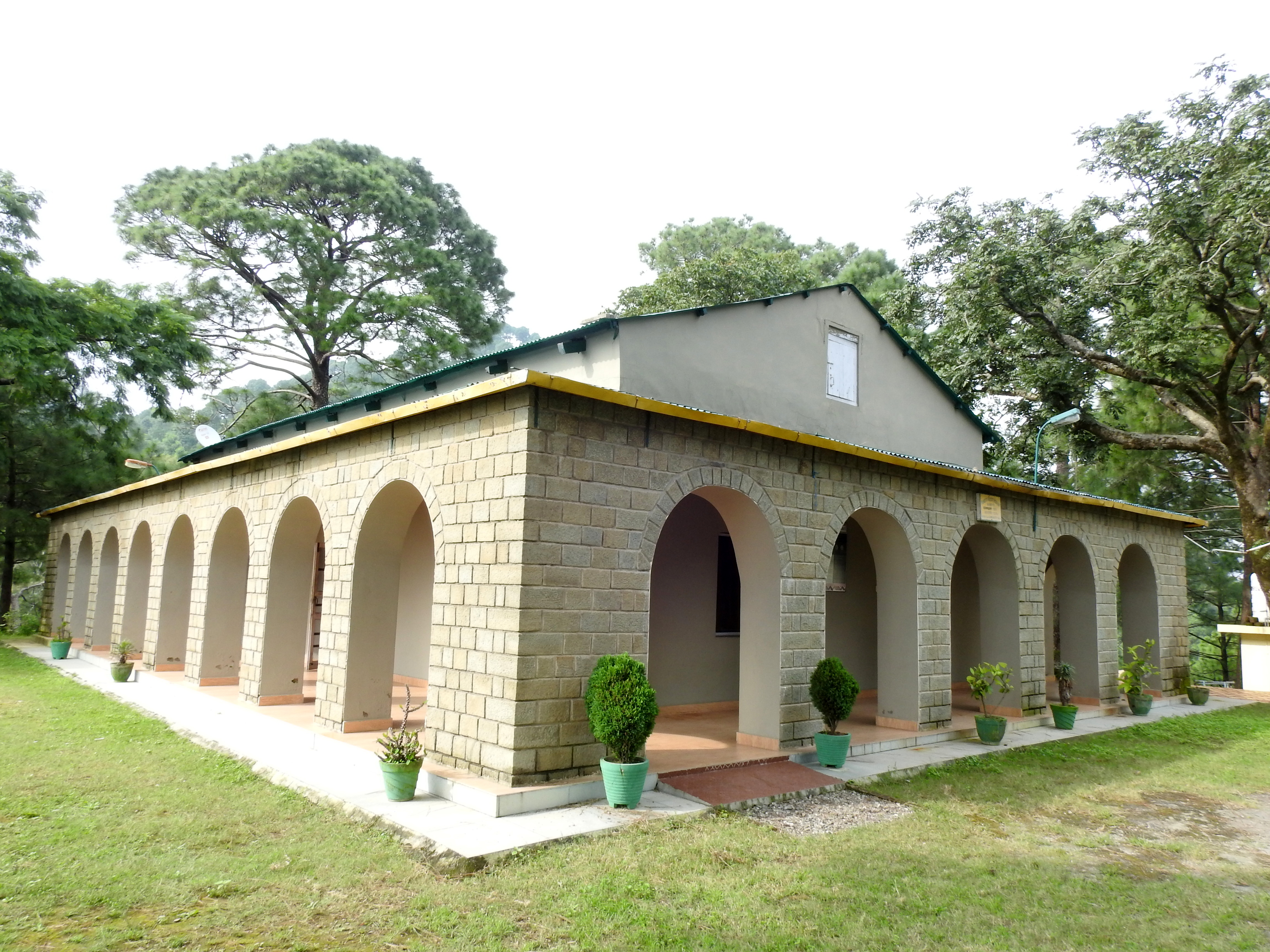
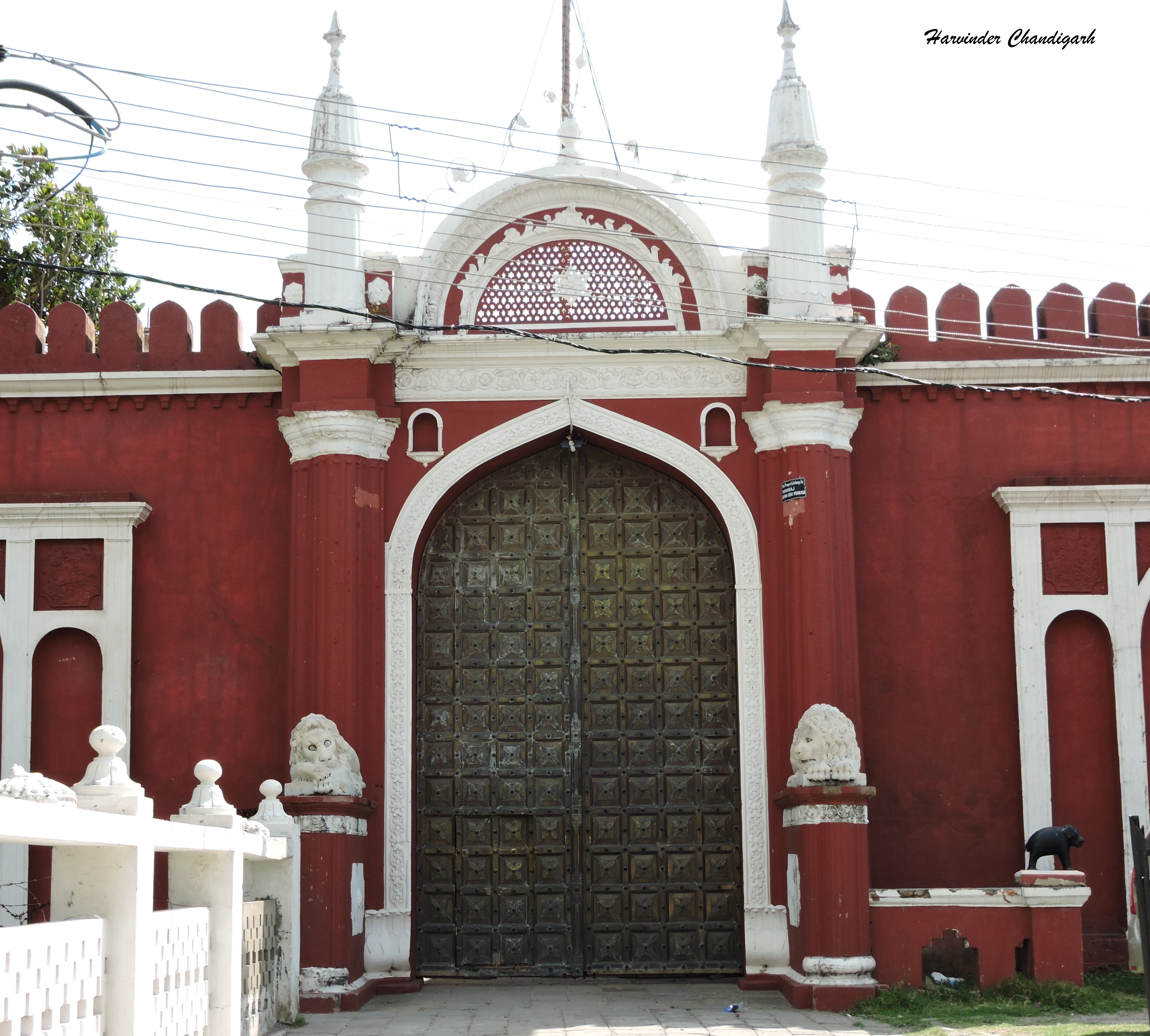
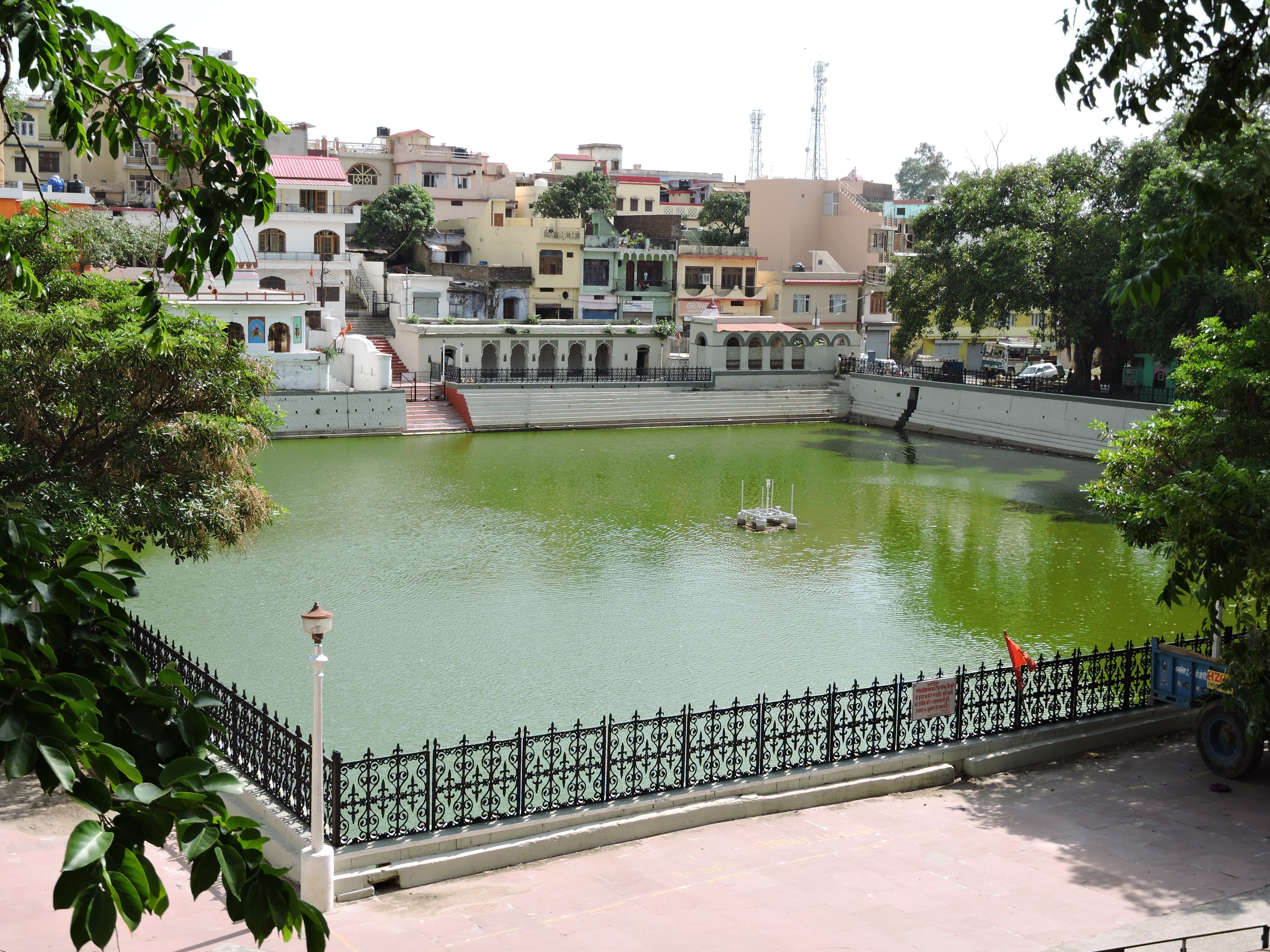
- From top, left to right: Nahan town panoramic view, Banethi Forest Rest House, Nahan Fort, Pakka Tank Pond

- Location in Himachal Pradesh, India Nahan (India)
- Coordinates: 30.55°N 77.3°E
- Country: India
- State: Himachal Pradesh
- District: Sirmaur

Government
  - Type: Municipal corporation
  - Body: Nahan Municipal Corporation
- Elevation: 932 m (3,058 ft)

Population (2011)
  - Total: 28,899
  - Rank: 5 in HP

Languages
  - Official: Hindi
  - Native: Sirmauri
- Time zone: UTC+5:30 (IST)
- PIN: 173001
- Vehicle registration: HP-18, HP-71
- Climate: Csa

Nahan is a town located in the Sirmaur district of the Indian state of Himachal Pradesh. It serves as the administrative headquarters of Sirmaur district. It was formerly the capital of the princely state of Sirmur, during the British Raj in Colonial India. Nahan is also known as the "Town of Ponds".

== Geography ==
Nahan is located at 30.55°N 77.3°E. The town has an average elevation of 932 metres (3,058 feet) above sea level.

== Demographics ==
According to the 2001 Census of India, Nahan tehsil had a population of approximately 35,000. Males constituted 54% of the population, while females accounted for 46%. The average literacy rate was 85%, which was higher than the national average of 59.5%; male literacy stood at 86%, and female literacy at 79%. Children below the age of six comprised about 11% of the population.

As per the 2011 Census of India, Nahan had a population of approximately 56,000. The sex ratio was 916 females per 1,000 males. The overall literacy rate was 83.4%, with male literacy at 87.01% and female literacy at 76.71%.

== Nahan City ==
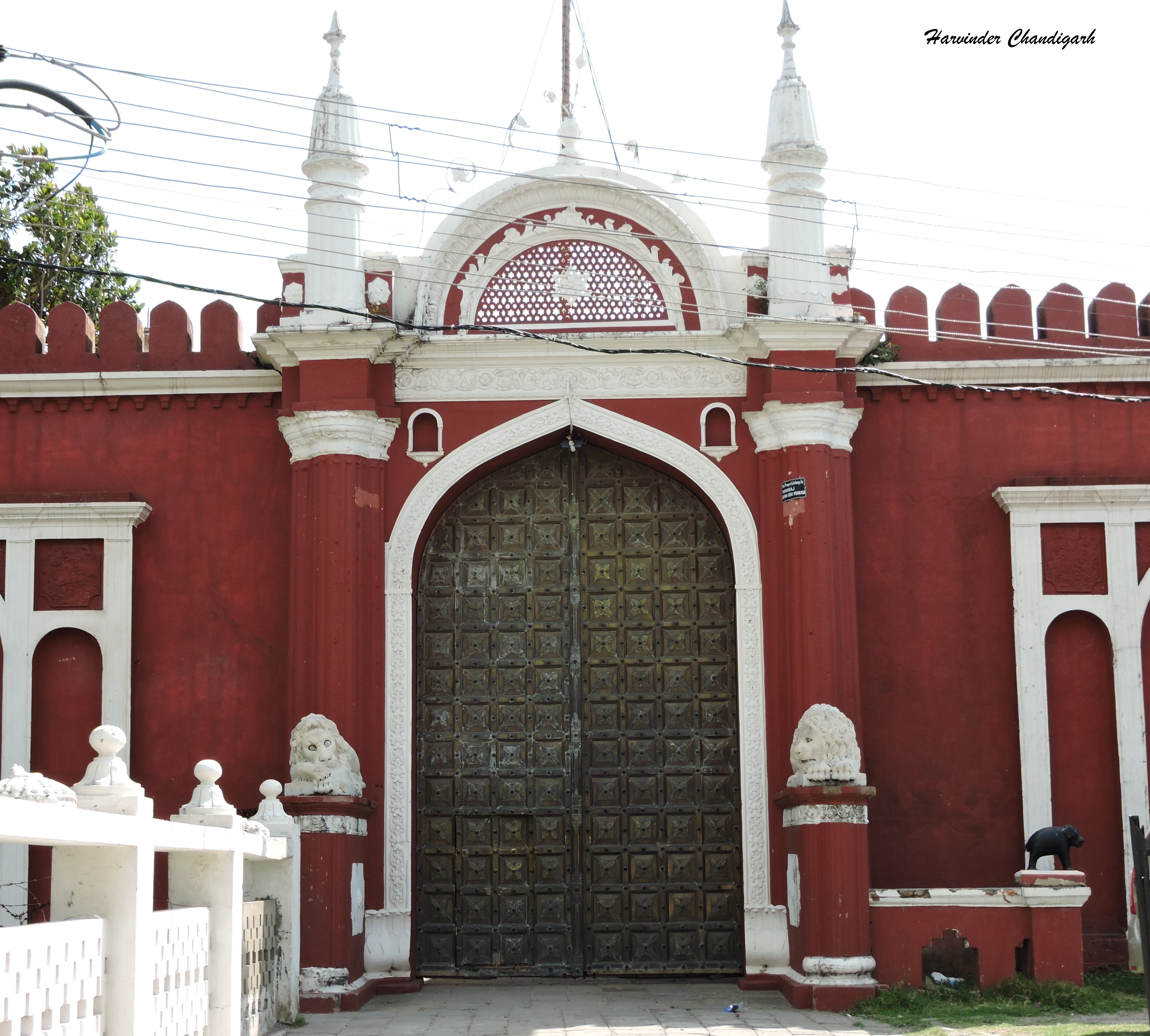
Nahan fort (as on 15 May 2016)

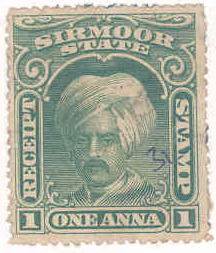
Stamp of Sirmour in 1800s

Nahan is situated atop a hill in the Shiwalik Hills, offering views of the surrounding green landscape. The town is traditionally associated with both saints and royalty. It was founded in 1621 by Raja Karam Prakash. According to another account, a saint named Baba Banwari Das lived at the site along with a companion named Nahar. The word "Nahar" is said to mean "do not kill," and the name Nahan is believed to have originated from an incident in which a saint stopped a king from killing a lion by uttering the word "Nahar." An alternative interpretation suggests that "Nahar" means lion in Sanskrit, and the presence of lions in the area may have influenced the name, which eventually evolved into "Nahan."

Located at an altitude of 932 metres (3,058 feet), Nahan serves as a base for visiting nearby attractions such as Renuka Lake, Paonta Sahib, Trilokpur, and the Suketi Fossil Park. The town features a man-made lake, along with several temples and gardens. Nahan is known for establishing the second Municipal Corporation in India, after Kolkata.

The town is reputed for its well-maintained underground sewerage system and is often regarded as a clean and orderly settlement. Its well-planned streets contribute to smooth traffic flow, and narrow pedestrian pathways are commonly used for quicker movement on foot.

The Municipal Corporation office is located near the Pakka Tank. Sirmaur district, in which Nahan is situated, is intersected by numerous rivers and streams, most of which have a perennial flow. As a result, fishing has been a longstanding activity in the region. Common fish species include mulle, mahseer, gid, and mirror carp, which contribute to the local economy.

Sirmaur district was not historically industrially advanced. The first industrial unit in the area was established in 1875 and was later taken over by the government in 1964. The main products of this foundry included cane crushers, cast iron and black sheet panels, flour mills, centrifugal pumps, monoblock pump sets, and other agricultural implements. During British rule, the foundry, located near the Kalisthan Temple, was taken over by the British administration. A building opposite the Nahan Foundry, constructed in 1945 to serve as the residence of the foundry's general manager, is currently used as the Sessions House and serves as the official residence of the District and Sessions Judge of Nahan.

== Places of interest ==
Nahan offers several attractions that reflect its cultural and historical heritage. The gentle level walks of Villa Round and Hospital Round (locally known as Chakkar ke Sadak) are reminiscent of the town's colonial past. The main hub of activity in Nahan is Chaugan, while Mall Road is a popular evening promenade, especially among college students and residents who enjoy evening walks. Social interaction is an integral part of local life, with people regularly meeting in the market or visiting friends' homes during their evening strolls.

Notable attractions include local gift shops, the Rosin and Turpentine Factory, and various temples. Points of interest in the surrounding areas include Markanda (8 km), Jamta, and Renuka Ji Lake (35 km from Nahan).

Located in the heart of the town is Rani Tal, which features a large temple and a historical water pond associated with the erstwhile rulers of the Sirmaur State. Ducks and cranes can often be seen in the pond, and the adjacent Rani Tal Garden enhances the location's charm. Another notable site is Pakka Talab, a renovated pond with garden seating. It serves as the venue for two major local festivals — the Baman Dwadshi Fair and the Gugga Peer Fair. Pakka Tank also hosts the town's wholesale vegetable market, which was recently shifted to Kanshiwalla. The only railway reservation centre in Nahan is located at the Panchayat Ghar near Pakka Tank.

Gunnu Ghat is considered the central point of Nahan, with several shortcut pathways connecting to various parts of the town. The historical Miyan Ka Mandir is especially popular during Krishna Janmashtami celebrations.

=== Religious places ===
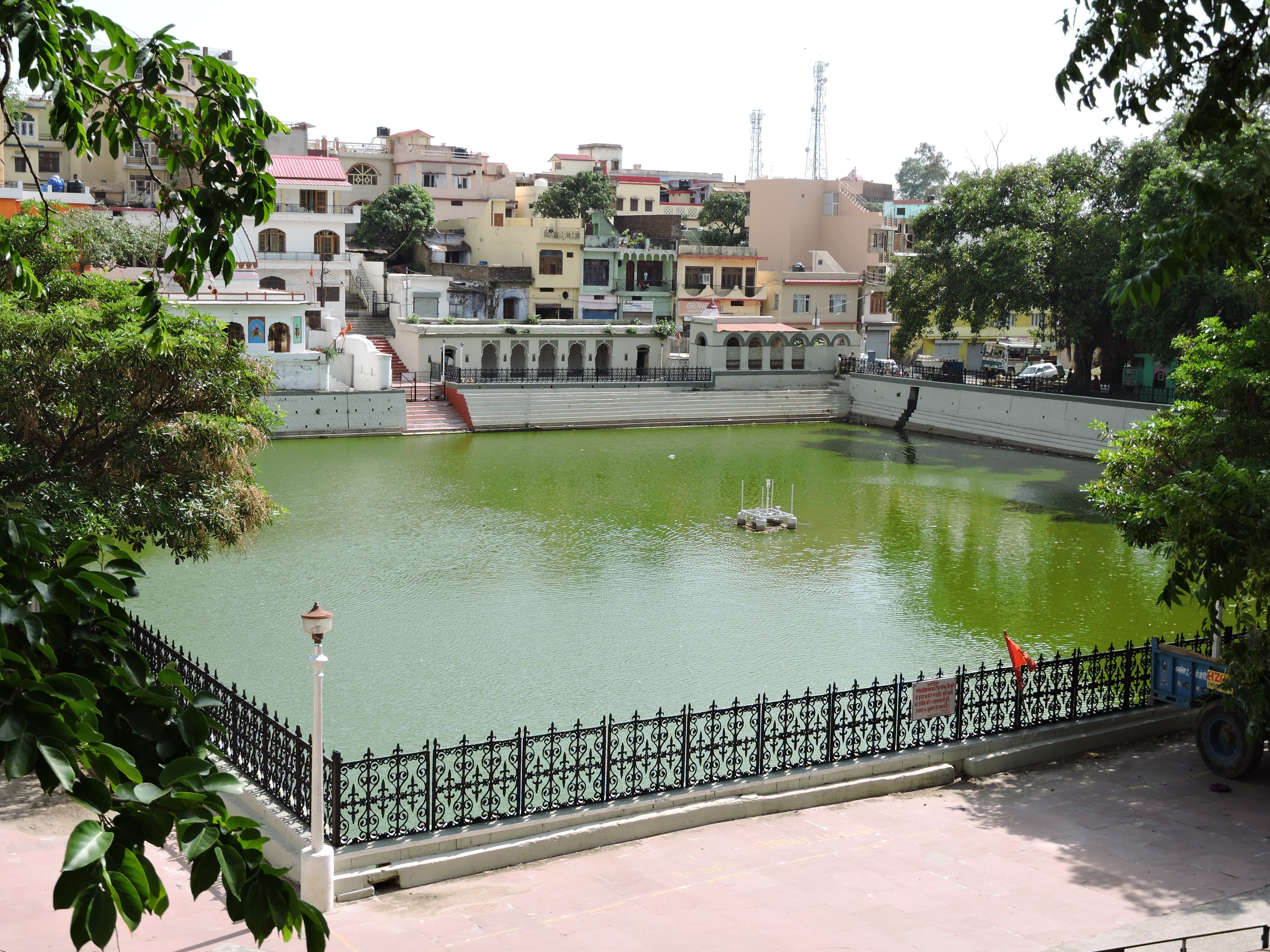
Packka Tank, Nahan, Himachal Pradesh, India

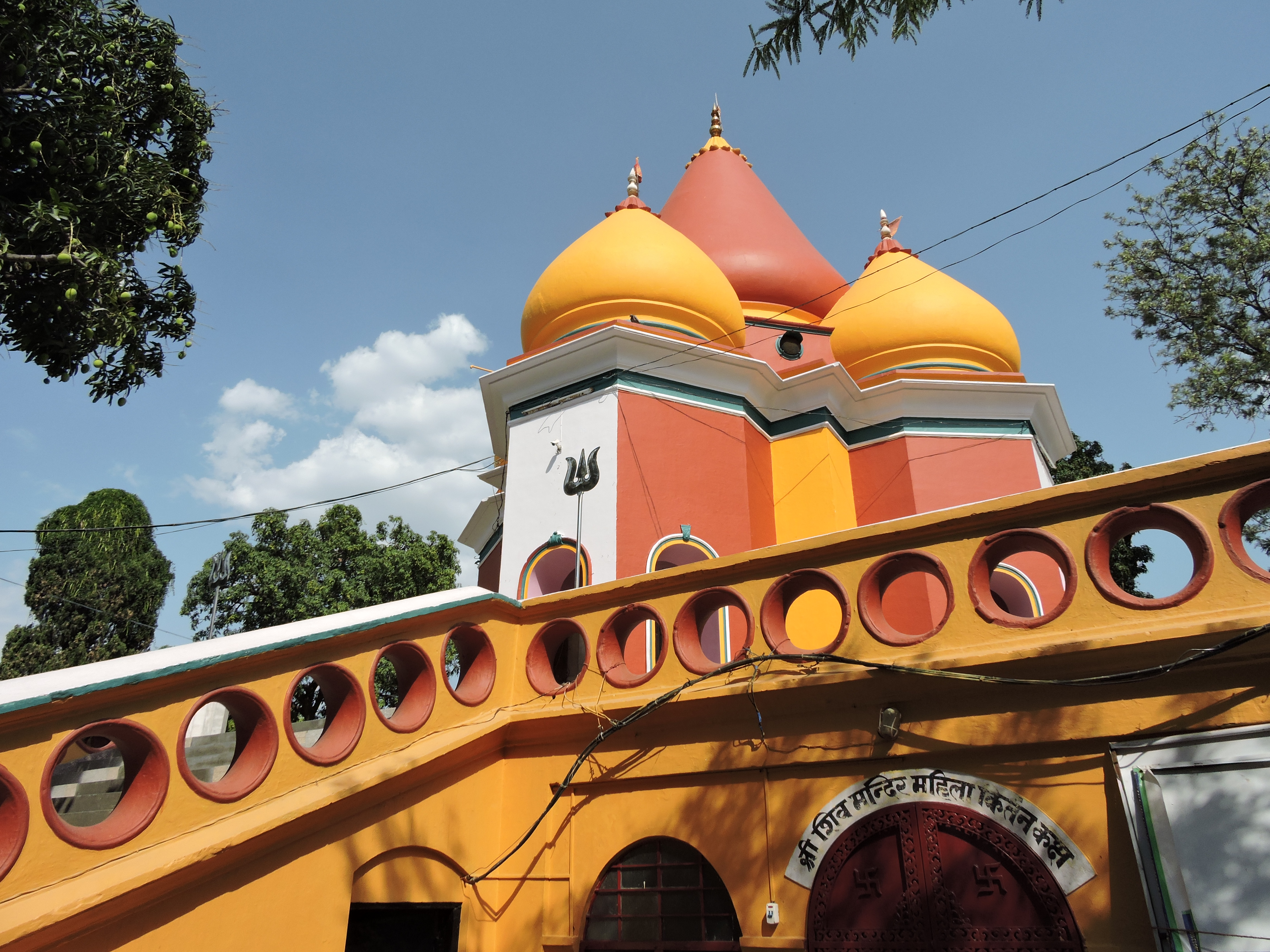
Rani Tal Shiv Temple, Nahan, Himachal Pradesh, India

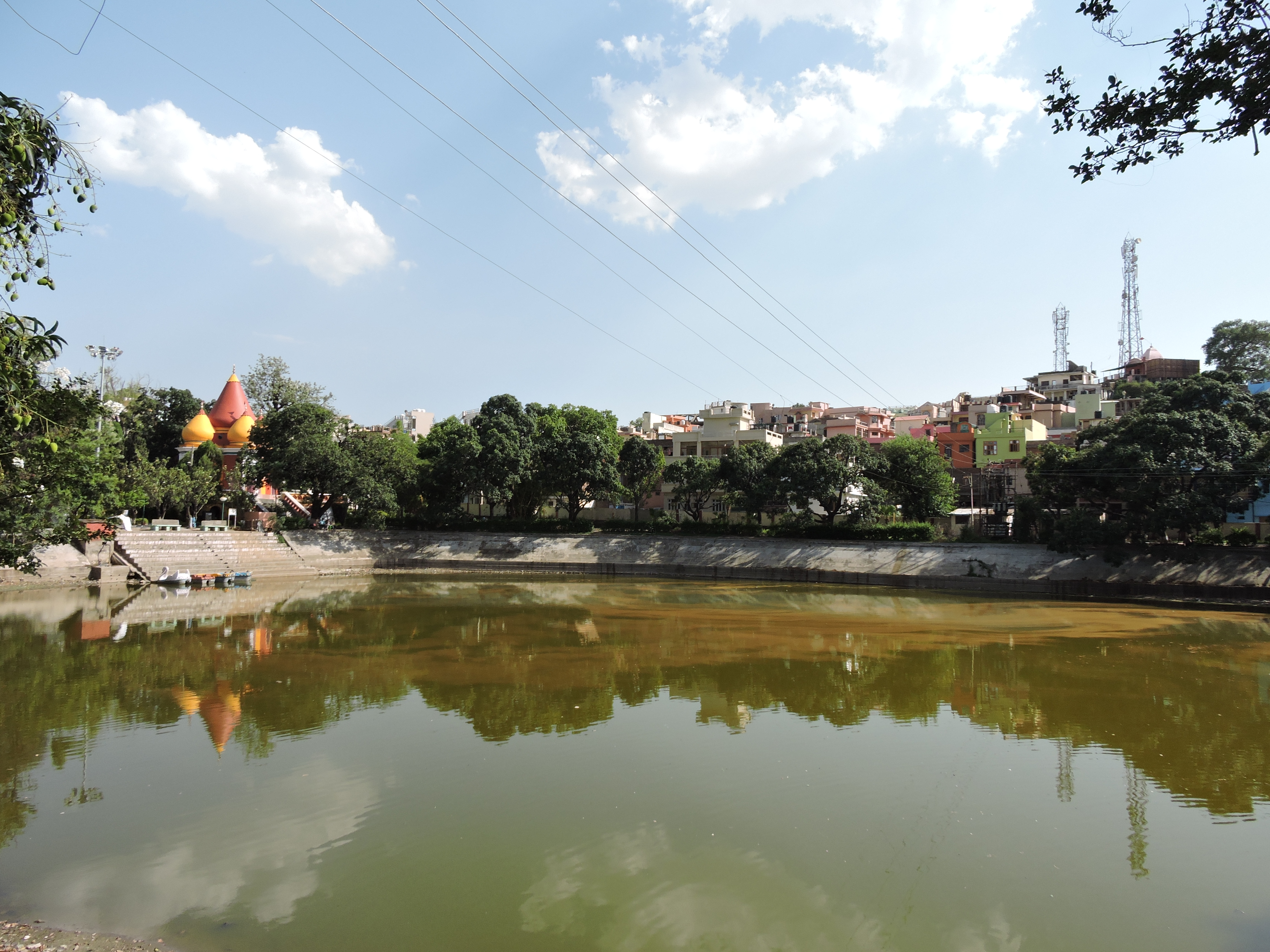
Rani Tal Shiv Temple Srovar, Nahan, Himachal Pradesh, India

- Shri Digambar, Jain Mandir
- Sri Sathya Sai Baba Temple
- Shiv Ji Temple, Saltevni
- Kalisthan Temple
- Jagannath Temple
- Rani Tal Shiv Temple
- Shiva Parvati Temple, Kumhar Gali (300 years old)
- Gurudwara Dashmesh Asthaan, Nahan
- Gurudwara Jhanda Ji, Shimla Road, Nahan
- Shri Krishna Temple, Nahan Cantt.
- Miyan Ka Mandir
- Lakshmi Narayan Temple, Upper Street
- Shudh Dhaar Shiv Mandir
- Nainidhar Shiv Mandir
- Bhagnari Shiv Mandir
- Sanatan Dharam Mandir
- Mata Balasundari Temple, Hospital Round
- Masjid Shamsher Ganj, Police Line
- Lakhdata peer ji, Kacha Tank
- Jamia Masjid

== Nearby places ==
Nahan is well connected to several nearby towns and tourist destinations. The following are approximate distances from Nahan to nearby locations:

- Paonta Sahib – 45 km
- Dhaulakuan - 24 km
- Rajban – 55 km
- Rama Dhaun – 14 km
- Kala Amb – 17 km
- Suketi – 21 km
- Trilokpur – 23 km
- Giri Nagar – 28 km
- Renuka Ji – 35 km
- Kotla-Molar – 55 km
- Palnoo – 50 km
- Yamunanagar – 65 km
- Ambala – 65 km
- Chandigarh – 85 km
- Dehradun – 92 km
- Mussorie – 125 km
- Sarahan – 43 km
- Sadhaura – 31 km
- Mandhana – 35 km
- Jamta – 13 km
- Jaitak Fort – 18 km
- Shimla – 135 km

Model Central Jail, Nahan (Himachal Pradesh)

Located in Sirmaur district, the Model Central Jail at Nahan is one of the oldest and most prominent prisons in Himachal Pradesh, established during the erstwhile Sirmour State and designated a Model Central Jail in 1962.

It houses both undertrials and convicted prisoners, with a capacity of around 470+ inmates, though it often exceeds this number. The jail is recognized for its reformative and vocational initiatives, including carpentry, tailoring, weaving, bakery, and horticulture, aimed at inmate rehabilitation.

Under the Himachal Pradesh Department of Prisons, the facility emphasizes Custody, Care, and Rehabilitation, and has even provided employment opportunities to inmates in local industries under rehabilitation programs.

== Climate ==
Climate data for Nahan (1991–2020, extremes 1953–2020)
Month	Jan	Feb	Mar	Apr	May	Jun	Jul	Aug	Sep	Oct	Nov	Dec	Year
Record high °C (°F)	27.4 (81.3)	31.4 (88.5)	37.6 (99.7)	43.1 (109.6)	46.2 (115.2)	46.0 (114.8)	42.7 (108.9)	39.4 (102.9)	37.5 (99.5)	36.0 (96.8)	32.6 (90.7)	30.4 (86.7)	46.2 (115.2)
Mean daily maximum °C (°F)	17.1 (62.8)	19.9 (67.8)	25.4 (77.7)	31.2 (88.2)	33.6 (92.5)	32.4 (90.3)	28.6 (83.5)	27.8 (82.0)	27.7 (81.9)	27.4 (81.3)	23.0 (73.4)	19.0 (66.2)	26.2 (79.2)
Mean daily minimum °C (°F)	7.6 (45.7)	10.2 (50.4)	15.1 (59.2)	21.0 (69.8)	23.2 (73.8)	22.7 (72.9)	21.6 (70.9)	21.2 (70.2)	20.4 (68.7)	18.2 (64.8)	13.6 (56.5)	9.8 (49.6)	17.1 (62.8)
Record low °C (°F)	−2.6 (27.3)	−1.1 (30.0)	2.2 (36.0)	6.1 (43.0)	10.0 (50.0)	10.5 (50.9)	13.7 (56.7)	12.8 (55.0)	11.5 (52.7)	6.4 (43.5)	0.6 (33.1)	−1.3 (29.7)	−2.6 (27.3)
Average rainfall mm (inches)	46.1 (1.81)	64.5 (2.54)	40.3 (1.59)	22.9 (0.90)	39.9 (1.57)	234.4 (9.23)	479.8 (18.89)	504.5 (19.86)	232.7 (9.16)	40.7 (1.60)	5.8 (0.23)	21.7 (0.85)	1,733.1 (68.23)
Average rainy days	2.3	3.3	2.8	2.0	3.2	8.4	15.7	15.1	8.5	1.8	0.5	1.1	64.7
Average relative humidity (%) (at 17:30 IST)	63	57	44	30	34	56	82	86	79	58	54	59	58
Source: India Meteorological Department

== Suketi Fossil Park ==
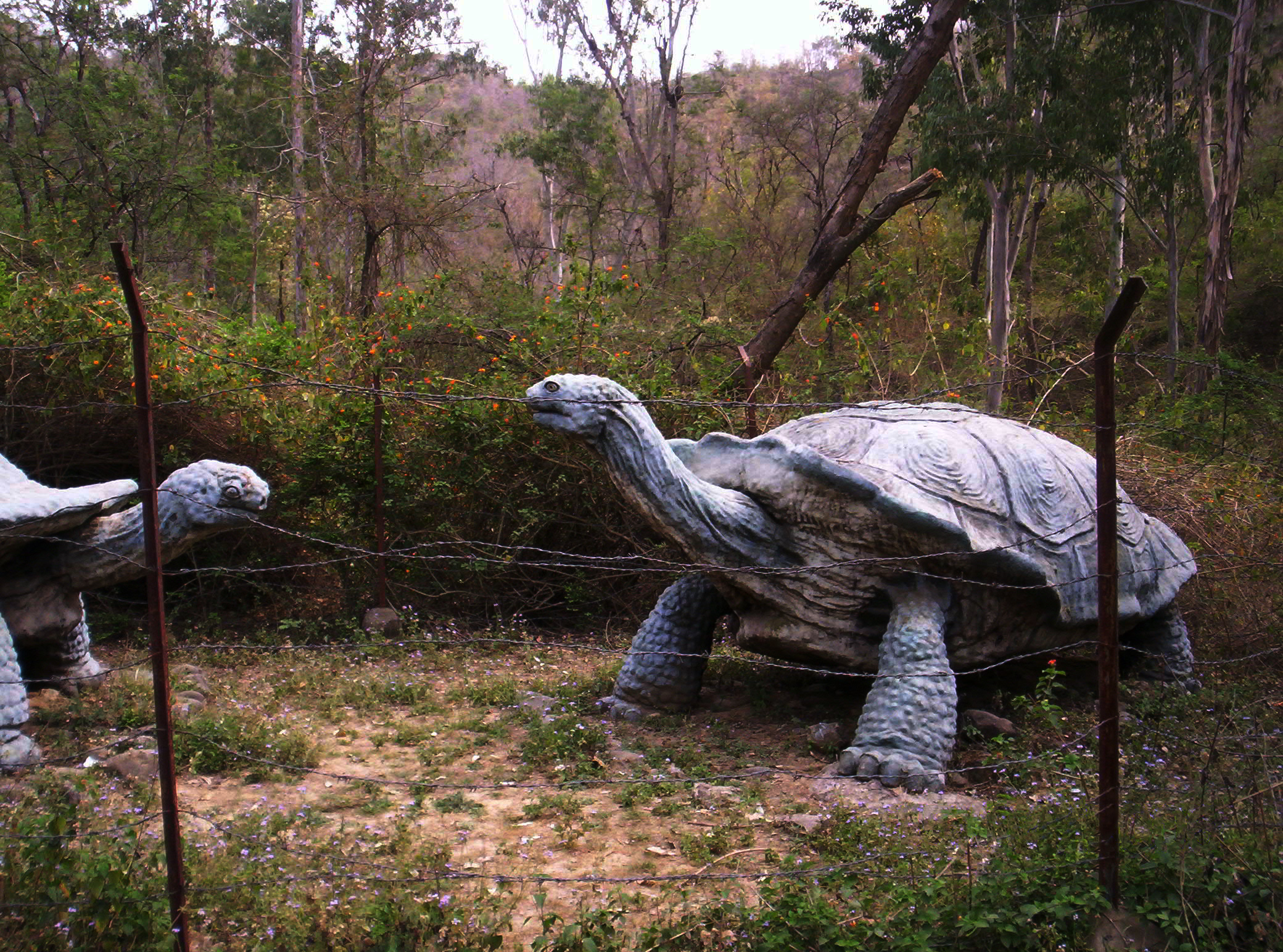
Fibre glass life size model of extinct giant tortoises of Siwalik Hills

Suketi Fossil Park, also known as Shivalik Fossil Park, is located approximately 21 km from Nahan. The park displays life-size fibre-reinforced plastic (FRP) models of prehistoric animals whose fossilised skeletons were discovered at the site. It is the first park of its kind in Asia to be developed at the actual location where fossils were found.

The park is situated on the left bank of the Markanda River and can be reached via a 4 km link road from the highway in Haryana. Located in the upper and middle Shiwaliks Hills, which consist mainly of soft sandstone and clay rocks, the park currently features six sets of life-size models representing species such as Stegodon ganesa, Sivatherium, Hexaprotodon sivalensis, Colossochelys atlas, Paramachaerodus, and Crocodilia. These Mesozoic animals once inhabited the region.

On 31 October 2010, a senior lecturer with the Department of Geological Survey discovered an approximately two-and-a-half-foot-long piece of ivory buried in sandy soil at the site. Based on previous carbon dating conducted in the region, the ivory is estimated to be around 150,000 years old.

== Trilokpur Temple ==
Trilokpur Temple, dedicated to Goddess Mahamaya Bala Sundari, was built in 1573 by Raja Dip Prakash. It is located approximately 23 km from Nahan and 6 km from Kala Amb, which serves as the gateway to Nahan from Haryana.

Trilokpur holds significant religious importance and attracts lakhs of devotees from across northern India, particularly from Haryana and Himachal Pradesh. A major fair is organised at the temple twice a year during the Navaratri festivals in April and October, during which large numbers of devotees visit to offer their prayers to the goddess.

== Giri Nagar ==
Giri Nagar is located approximately 5 km from Dhaula Kuan, along the Nahan–Paonta Sahib highway. The town derives its name from the Giri River, on whose banks it is situated.

Giri Nagar is notable for its hydroelectric power house with a capacity of 60 MW, which was constructed by diverting the Giri River through a 6 km long tunnel. The power generated here is supplied to the states of Uttar Pradesh and Punjab.

== Transport infrastructure ==
=== Air ===
The nearest airport to Nahan is Chandigarh Airport. Dehradun's Jolly Grant Airport also serves as an alternative. Shimla Airport is another nearby option.

=== Rail ===
The nearest railway stations to Nahan are Barara, Ambala, Chandigarh, and Kalka, all of which are connected by regular bus services. Yamunanagar is another nearby railway station providing access to the town.

=== Road ===
Nahan is well connected to the rest of Himachal Pradesh and other parts of India via National Highway 7 and National Highway 907A. The town is accessible from multiple directions: via Baila from Rajban; via Dehradun through Paonta Sahib; via Panchkula–Naraingarh–Kala Amb from Chandigarh; via Yamunanagar–Hathnikund from Haryana; and via Solan–Kumarhatti from Shimla.

Regular bus services operate between Nahan and major cities such as Shimla, Chandigarh, Dehradun, Delhi, and Haridwar. The most convenient route from Delhi is via Saha, which can be reached by taking a right exit from NH1 after crossing Shahbad and the bridge over the River Markanda.

Direct bus services to Nahan are available from several cities, including Amritsar, Chandigarh, Delhi, Ambala, Shimla, Ludhiana, Bathinda, Jammu, Katra, Dehradun, Haridwar, Vikasnagar, Chopal, Nerwa, and Haldwani. These services are operated by various state transport corporations such as HRTC, PRTC, CTU, Haryana Roadways, and Punbus. The main bus stand is located in the centre of the city. Buses can also be boarded from Do Sarka (Shaktinagar), which serves as a bypass point for Nahan.

== Fairs and festivals ==
=== Vaaman Dwadshi ===
Vaaman Dwadshi is celebrated in Nahan towards the end of the monsoon season. During this festival, fifty-two cult images of local deities are carried in a ceremonial procession to the Jagannath Temple. These images are then floated in a ritualistic manner in a sacred pond and are returned to their respective niches at midnight.

=== Gugga Veer Fair ===
The Gugga Veer Fair is held in honour of Gogaji, also known as Gugga, a revered folk deity of Rajasthan. He is celebrated as a warrior-hero and is venerated by both Hindus and Muslims. Among Hindus, he is known as Goga, while Muslims refer to him as Jahar Peer. He is also considered a snake deity. The Kaimkhani Muslim community claims descent from him and honours him as a saint (peer).

=== Jamta Fair ===
The Ashtami Fair is organised annually in the village of Jamta, two days prior to the Dussehra festival. The event is conducted by the local Gram Panchayat and attracts participation from nearby areas.

== Education facilities ==
A residential school operated by the Ministry of Human Resource Development (HRD), Government of India, is located at Judda Ka Johar, approximately 5 km from the main town. Students from various distant regions enrol in this institution for quality education.

Dr. Yashwant Singh Parmar Government Medical College, Nahan, was established in 2016 as the third medical college in Himachal Pradesh. Initially set up with an intake of 100 students, the capacity was later increased to 120. Named after Dr. Yashwant Singh Parmar, the first Chief Minister of Himachal Pradesh, the college aims to provide quality medical education and healthcare services. The institution offers both undergraduate and postgraduate medical courses and is equipped with modern facilities such as laboratories, libraries, and advanced medical technologies. It also plays a significant role in regional healthcare and medical research.

A college in Nahan offers a dual-degree programme, awarding both Shastri and Bachelor of Arts (B.A.) degrees. The college has its own dedicated building and provides hostel facilities for male students.

The Government Post Graduate College, Nahan, affiliated with Himachal Pradesh University, is the primary institution for undergraduate and postgraduate education in the region. Students from nearby and remote areas come here for higher education. The college also provides hostel facilities for female students.

Nearby, two engineering colleges are located: Himalayan Group of Professional Institutions in Kala Amb (20 km away) and Green Hills Engineering College in Kumarhatti (approximately 60 km away).

Despite Himachal Pradesh being ranked among the leading states in health and education, the Sirmaur district has faced challenges in these sectors.

Sirmaur also hosts several computer education centres.

Prominent schools in and around Nahan include:

- Jawahar Navodaya Vidyalaya, Nahan
- Career Academy Senior Secondary School
- Carmel Convent School
- Army Public School Nahan
- A.V.N public school
- D.A.V Public School
- Sirmaur Hills Public School
- Arihant International School
- Holy Heart Public School
- Silver Bells Public School Nahan (Primary and Middle School)
- S.V.N Public School
- Model Primary School
- Shamsher Senior Secondary School
- Cantt Primary School
- Mandir Primary School
- Parangat Primary School
- Aastha Special School (for special children)
