= Himalayan Natural Mineral Water =

Bottled water brand

- Type: Private
- Industry: Mineral water
- Founded: 1991
- Headquarters: Paonta Sahib, Himachal Pradesh, India
- Number of locations: India, United Kingdom, United States

Himalayan Natural Mineral Water is a brand of bottled natural mineral water produced by Tata Consumer Products. The water is sourced from an underground aquifer in the Shivalik range of the Himalayas in India and is bottled at a facility in Paonta Sahib, Himachal Pradesh.

== History ==
The brand was established in 1991 by Dadi Balsara, who founded Mount Everest Mineral Water Limited (MEMW). A bottling facility was built at Dhaula Kuan, Paonta Sahib, Himachal Pradesh, to bottle natural mineral water.

In 2007–2008, Tata Tea Limited (later renamed Tata Consumer Products Limited) acquired a stake in MEMW. By 2008, Tata Tea held 31.73% of MEMW's paid-up share capital and subsequently acquired the remaining shares, making MEMW a wholly owned subsidiary.

== Source and composition ==
The water is drawn from a confined aquifer in the foothills of the Shivalik range and is naturally filtered through rock strata before collection, according to Tata Consumer Products. The company states that the water retains its naturally occurring minerals and is not chemically treated, in line with standards for natural mineral water under Bureau of Indian Standards specification IS 13428 and Food Safety and Standards Authority of India (FSSAI) regulations.

== Distribution ==
Packaged natural mineral water in India is regulated under the Food Safety and Standards Regulations and Bureau of Indian Standards specification IS 13428, which set requirements for source, composition, treatment, packaging, and quality control. According to the manufacturer, the water is bottled at source and retains its naturally occurring mineral composition.

The brand is distributed within India and exported to markets including Singapore, the Maldives, Nepal, Mauritius, Russia, Malaysia, and South Korea.

== Recognition ==
- 2021: National Award for Excellence in Water Management by Confederation of Indian Industry
