= Palnoo =

- Village
- Interactive map of Palnoo
- Country: India
- State: Himachal Pradesh
- District: Sirmaur

Population
  - Total: 150

Languages
  - Official: Hindi
  - Native: Sirmauri

Palnoo or Palnu is a small village in Sirmaur district, in the Shiwalik hills range of Himachal Pradesh, India. It is in Nahan tehsil, 55 kilometres (34 mi) from Nahan town and about 17 kilometres (11 mi) from Renuka Lake (the largest and longest natural lake in Himachal Pradesh).

The post office is at Kotla Molar that located approximately 1 km away from the village. The population of this village is around 150 and one third of the villagers have been moved to nearby towns (Dadahu and Nahan) for the education of their children and for earning money.

There is a registered Mahila Mandal in the village (Santosh Mahila Mandal) and the objectives of this Mahila mandala are: family welfare, educating each and everyone in the village, provision of bathrooms and toilets for every family, smokeless chulhas, a women's crafts centre, small saving accounts for women, providing vocational training and credit facilities to women for self-employment and working for the unity of villagers. Raksha Sharma is president (Pradhan) of this Mahila Mangal (Women's Group). There are several temples of Maahsu Dev and Shirgul Dev. Ganesh Mandir at Kotla Molar, Baddu Saahid and Becher ka Bagh are nearby attractions.
