= Gurdwara Paonta Sahib =

Sikh worship place in Sirmour, India

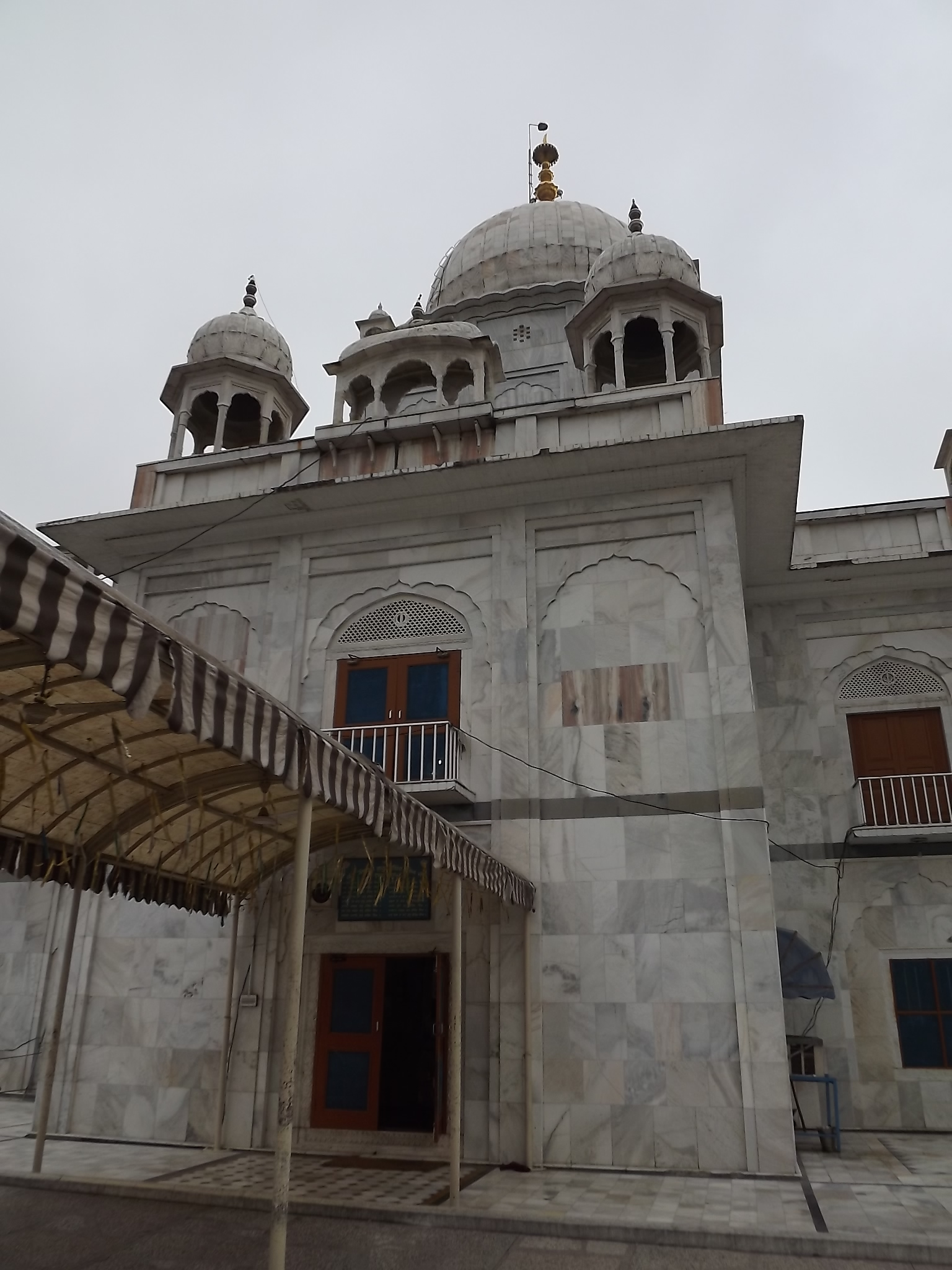
- Gurdwara photographed in September 2012

Religion
- Affiliation: Sikhism

Location
- Location: Paonta Sahib, Sirmur district, Himachal Pradesh
- Interactive map of Gurdwara Paonta Sahib

Gurdwara Paonta Sahib is a noted gurdwara in Paonta Sahib, district of Sirmaur, Himachal Pradesh.

== History ==
This Gurdwara was built in memory of Guru Gobind Singh, the tenth guru of sikhs. The gurdwara enjoys a high historic and religious importance among the followers of the Sikh religion world over. The Gurudwara has a palanquin "Palki" made of pure gold, donated by devotees.

== Attractions ==
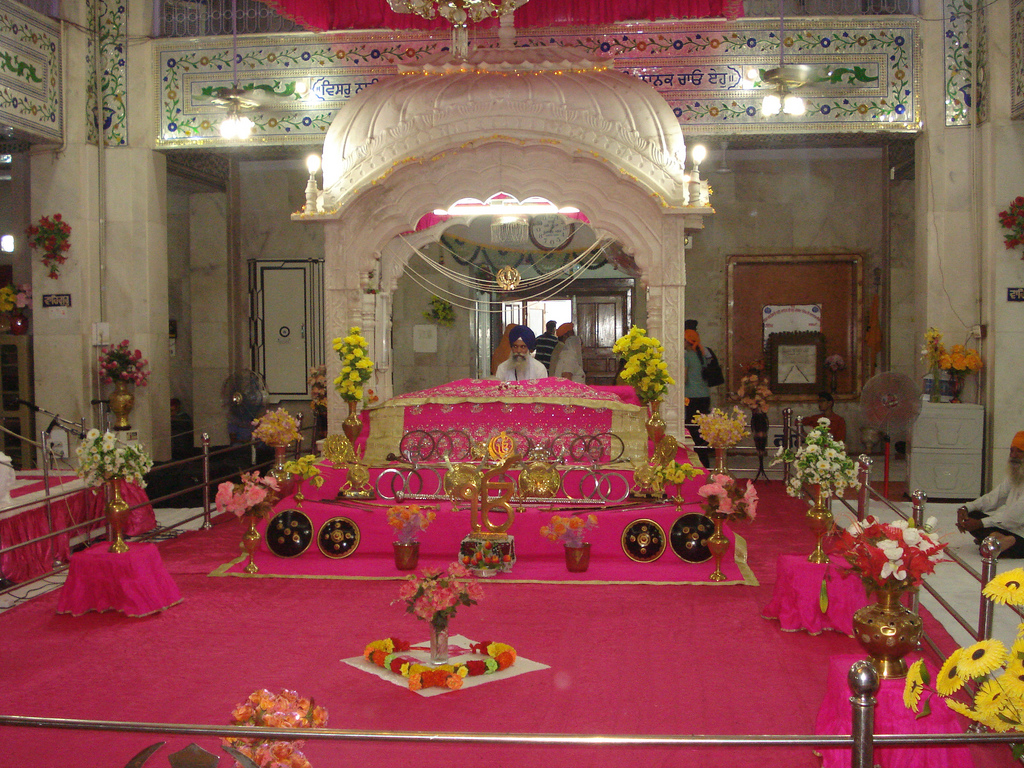
Inside the Gurudwara Paonta Sahib, Sirmour dist., Himachal Pradesh.

Sri Talab Asthan and Sri Dastar Asthan are the vital places inside the Sikh shrine. Sri Talab Asthan is used for disbursing salaries and Sri Dastar Asthan is used for organizing the turban tying competitions. A legendary temple is also attached to the Gurdwara which is rebuilt recently in the vicinity of Gurdwara compound. Kavi Darbar, a prominent place near the Gurdwara is the venue for holding the poetry competitions. The weapons and pens used by Guru Gobind Singh are displayed in a museum near the Paonta Sahib Gurdwara. The Gurdwara is visited by tourists from different states. The site is situated on the bank of the River Yamuna. This gurdwara serves langar (parshada) for all. The gurdwara contains the Sahibzada Baba Ajit Singh Library and Museum.

Another place of religious and historical importance is the Gurdwara built at Bhangani Sahib, about 1 km from Gurdwara Tir Garhi Sahib. With its proximity to the river Yamuna, the whole area presents a picturesque sight.

== Gallery ==
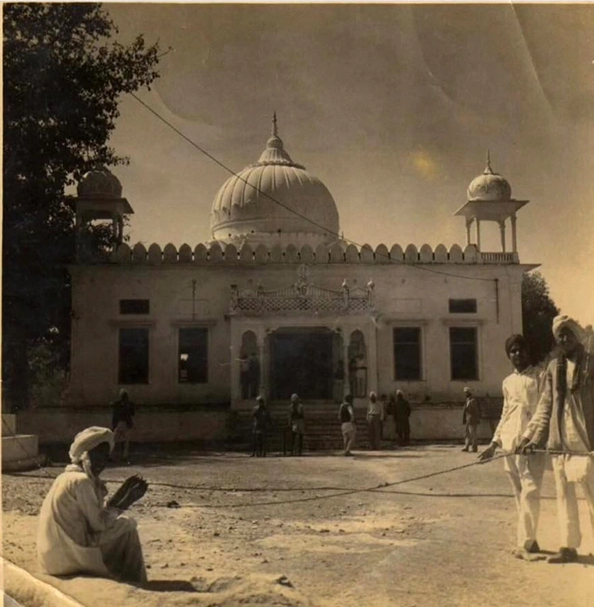
Photograph taken of Gurdwara Paonta Sahib in circa 1944

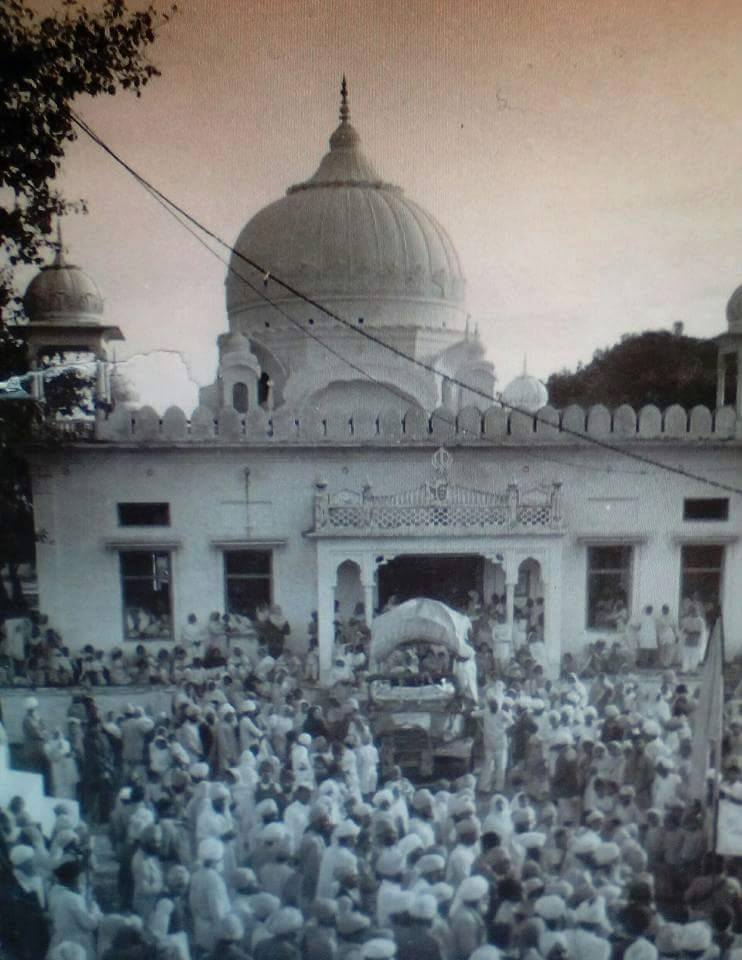
Photograph taken of Gurdwara Paonta Sahib in circa 1962 during a celebration or festival

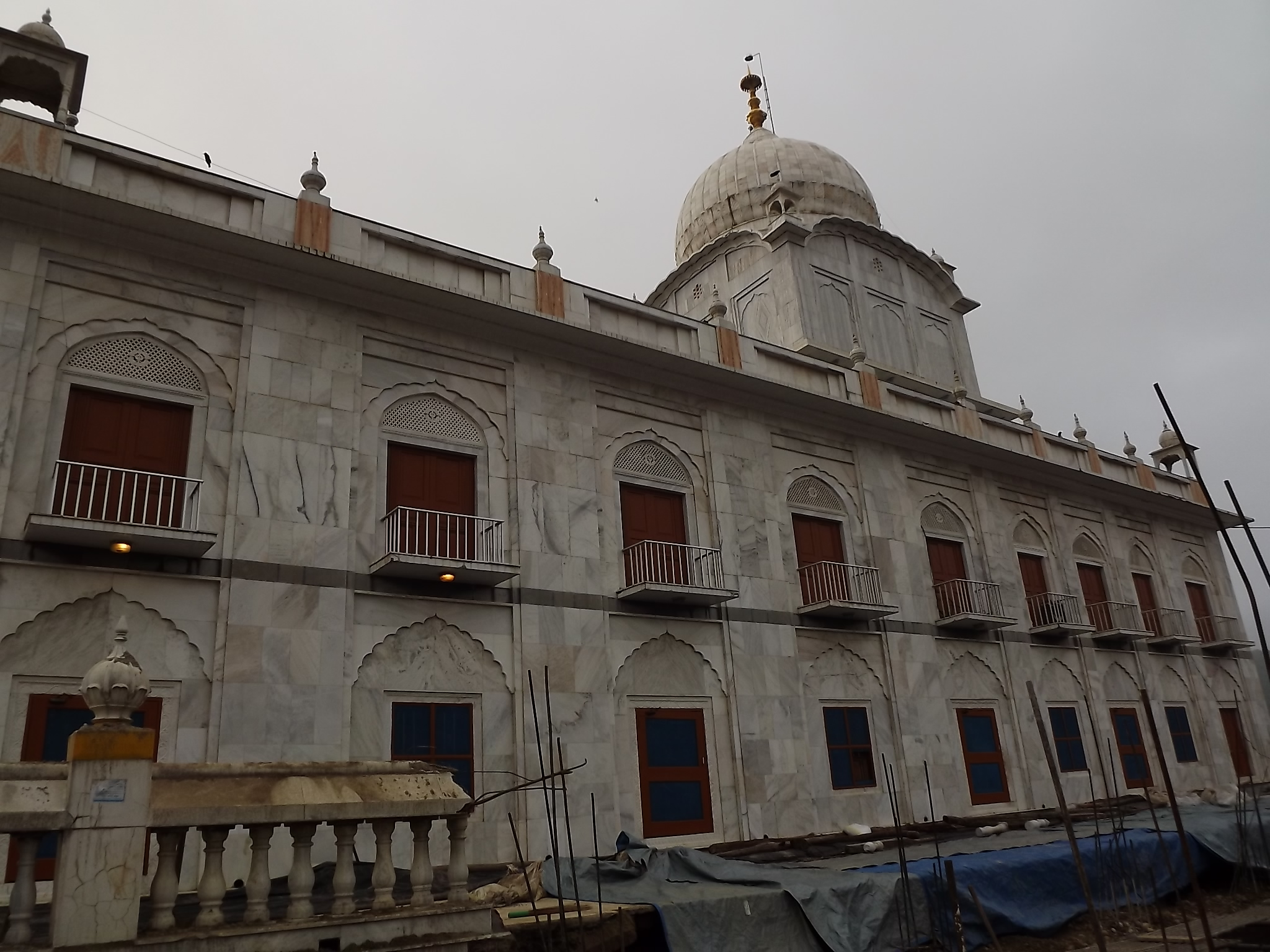
Present-day shrine

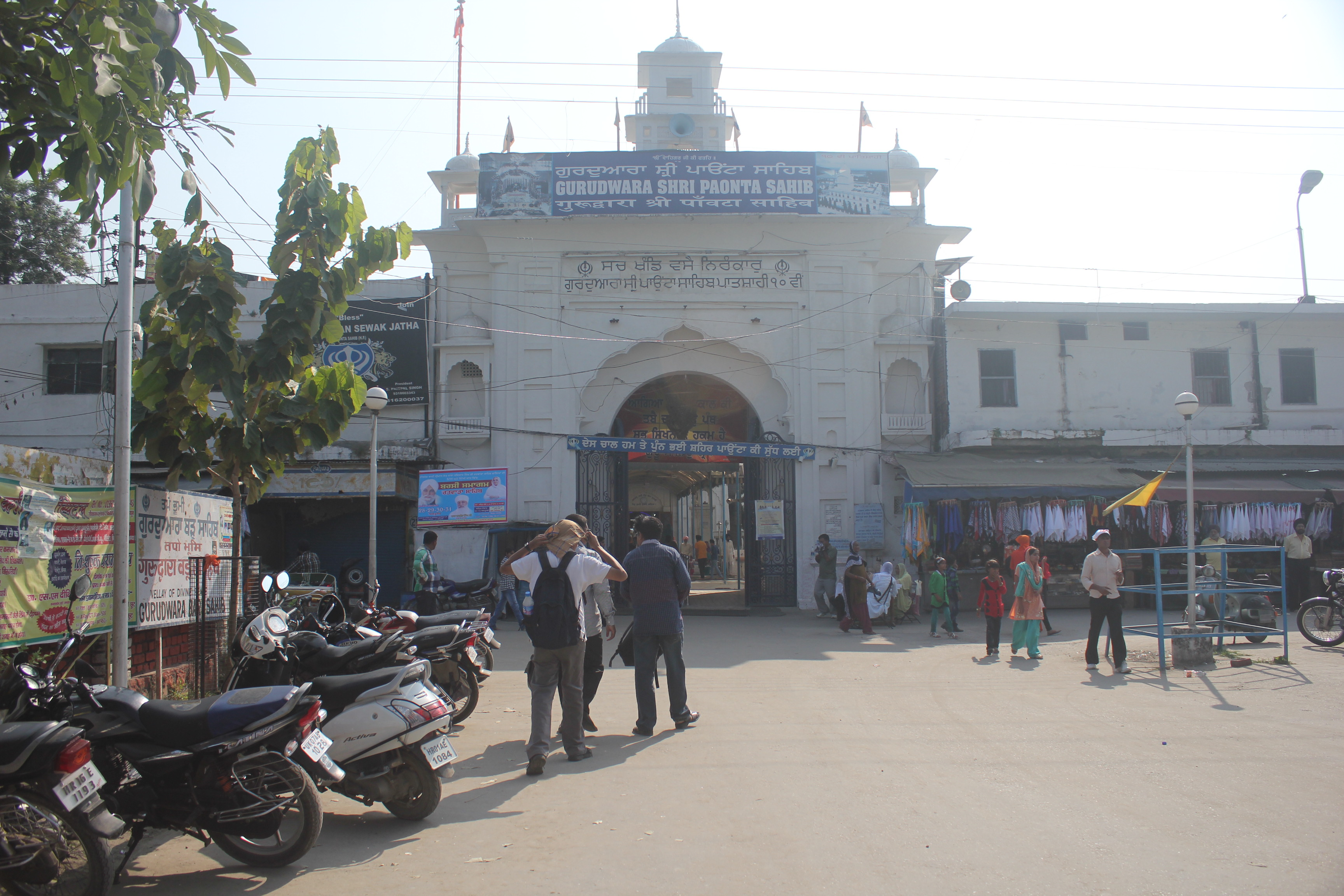
Gateway to the complex

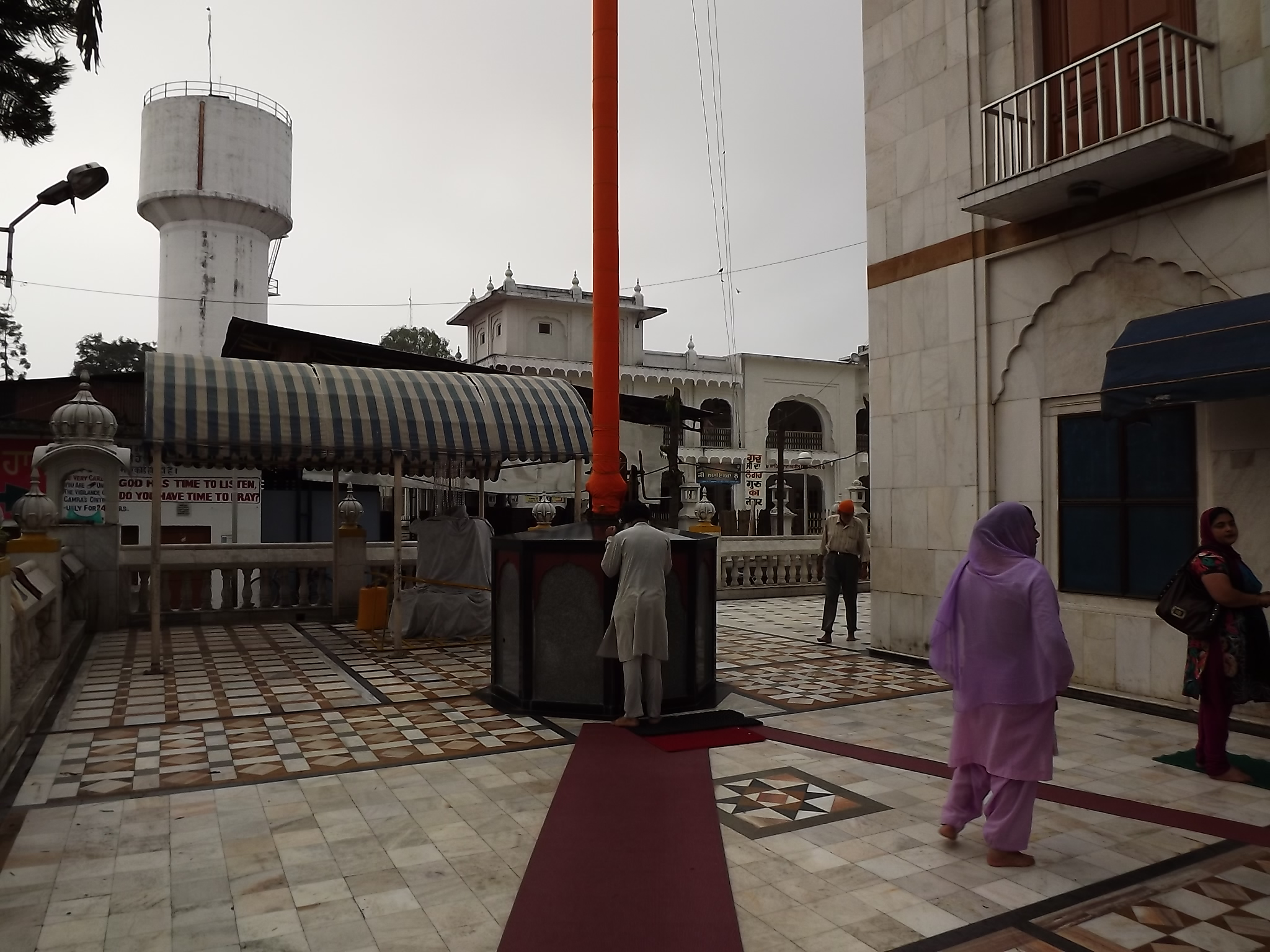
Reverence of the Nishan Sahib

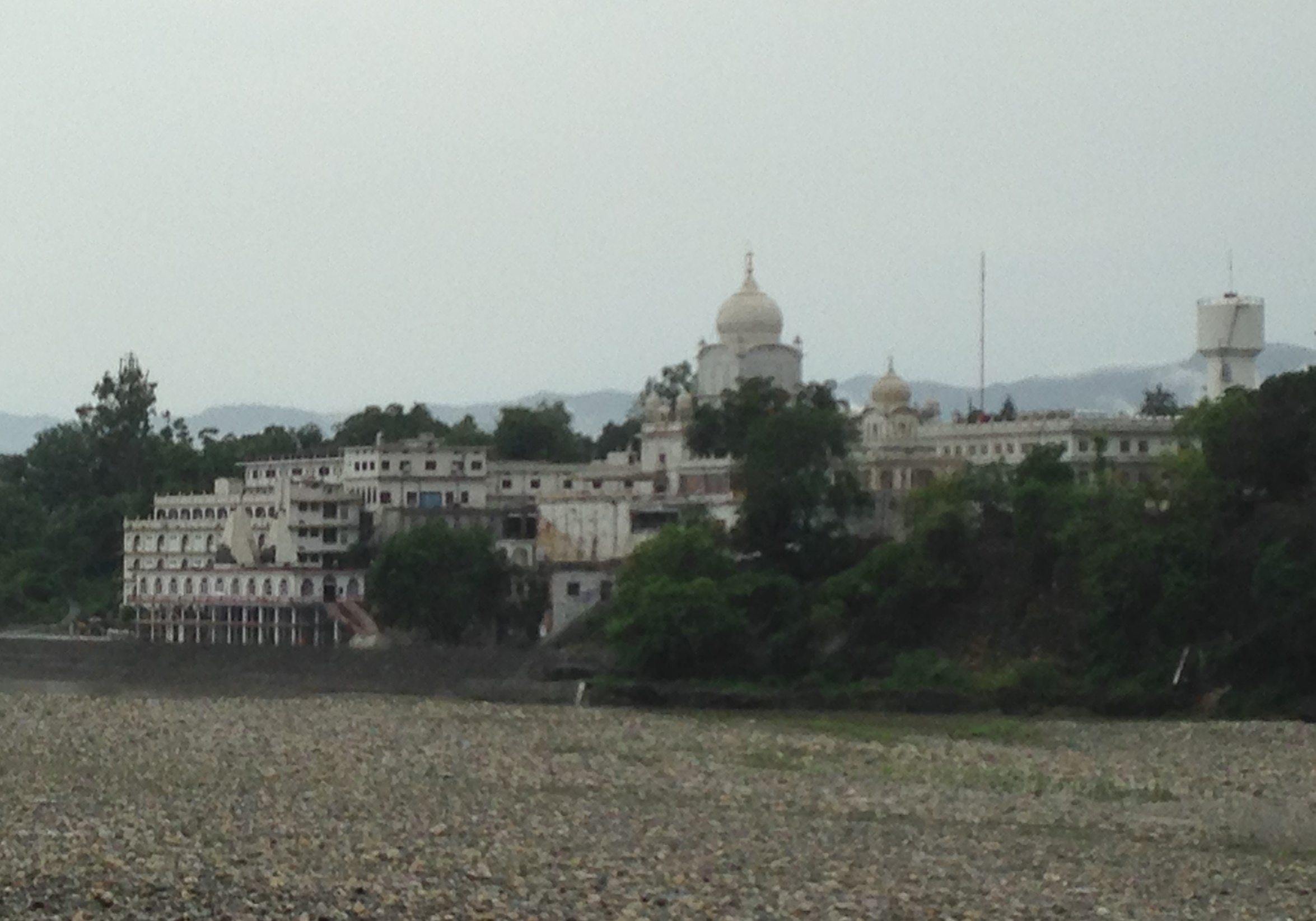
View of the entire complex

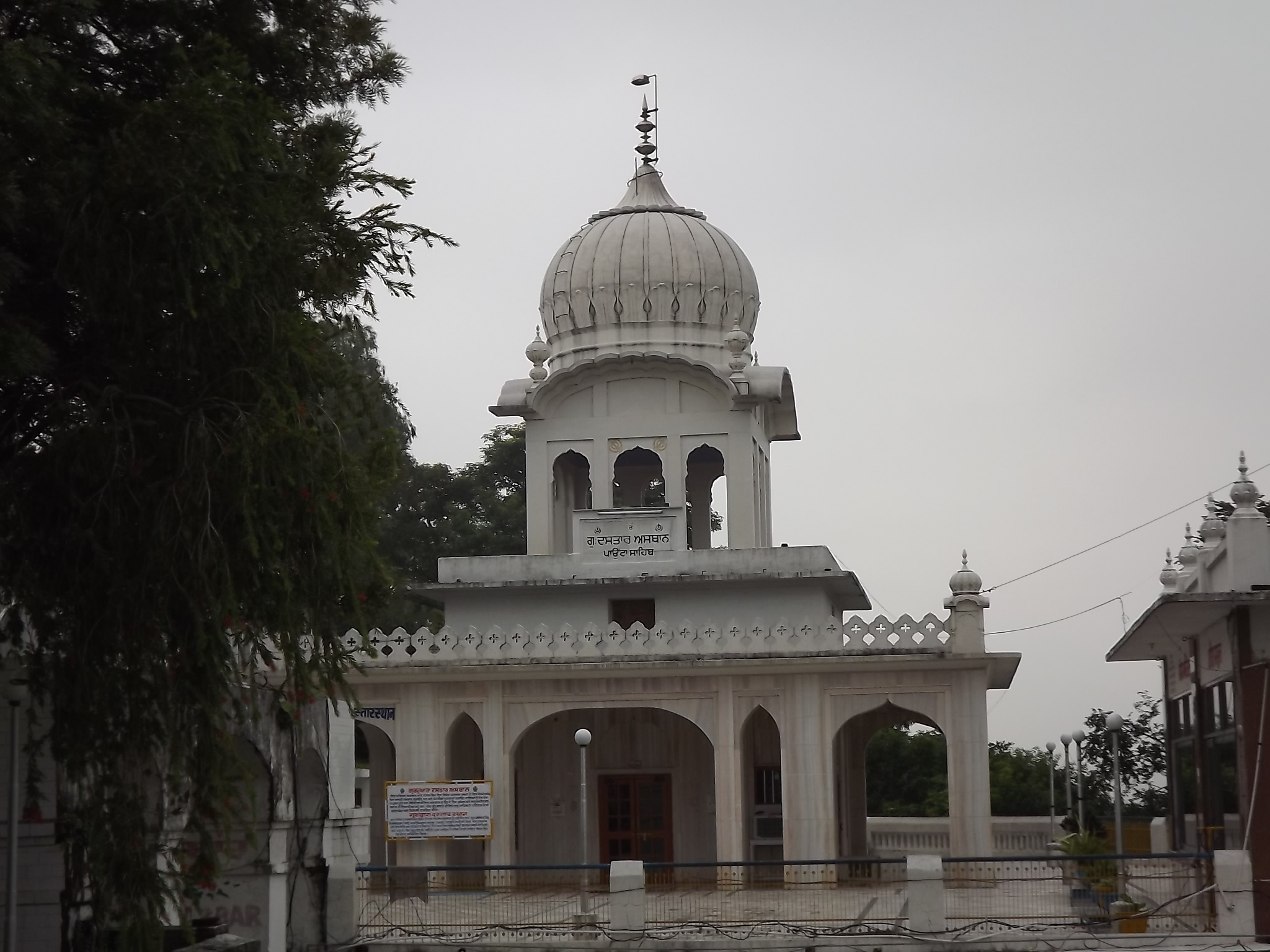
Gurdwara Sri Dastar Asthan Sahib, located within the Gurdwara Paonta Sahib complex

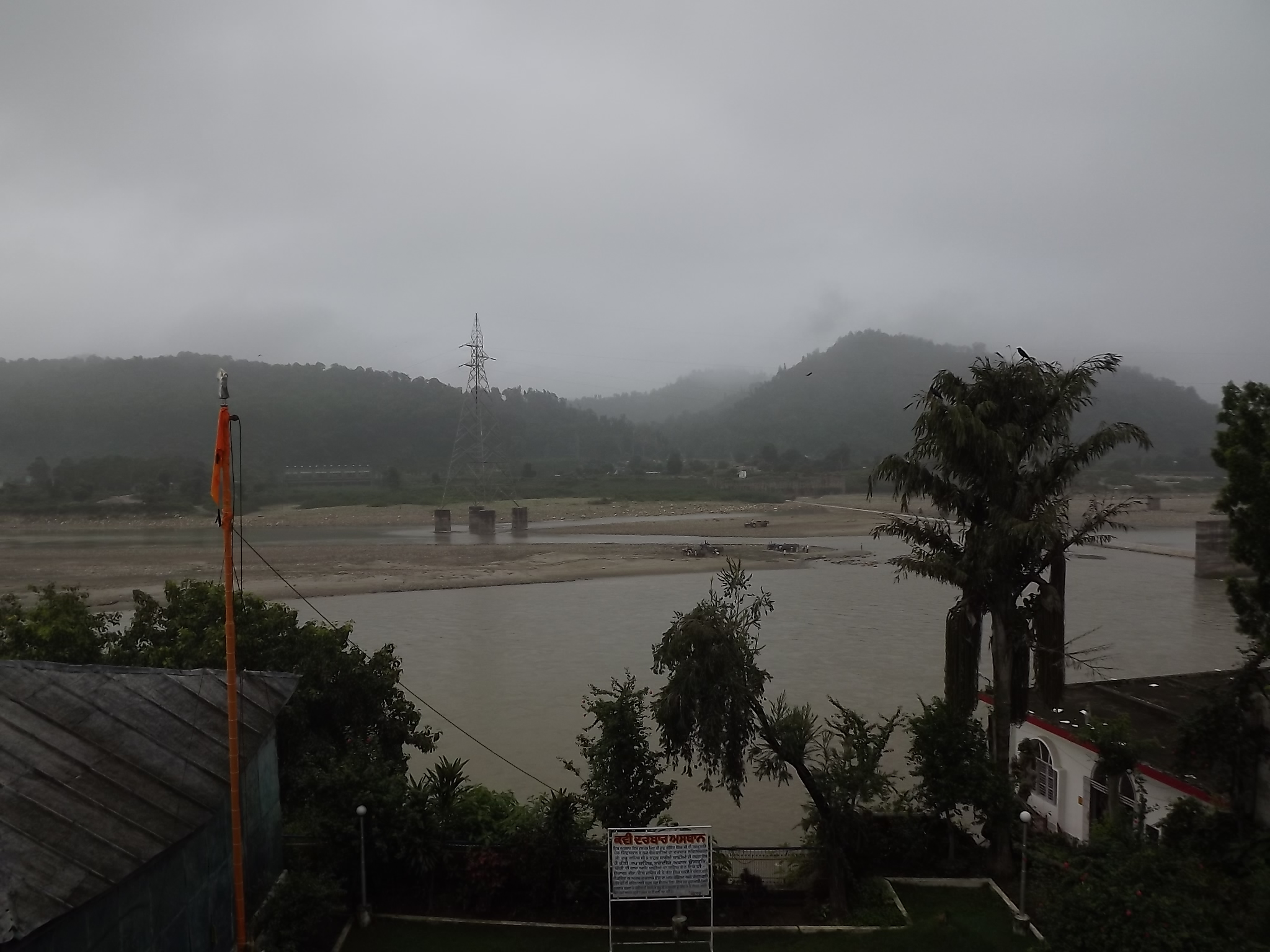
View of the Yamuna River from the complex
