= Suketi =

Village in Sirmaur district, Himachal Pradesh

Coordinates: 30.506°N 77.241°E

Suketi is a village in Sirmaur District, Himachal Pradesh, India. It has Asia's oldest Fossil park Shivalik Fossil Park.

== Details ==
At a distance of 21 km from Nahan, it displays lifesize fiber reinforced plastic (FRP) models of prehistoric animals whose fossil skeletons were unearthed here. The park is the first of its kind in Asia to be developed at the actual discovery site of fossils. The Park is located on the left bank of the Markanda River and is approachable by a link road 4 km from highway from Haryana. Located on upper and middle Shiwaliks, consisting mainly of soft sandstone and clay rocks, the park at present has six sets of life-size models, of Stegodon Ganesha, Sivatherium, Hexaprotodon sivalensis, Colossochelys atlas, Paramachairodus and Crocodilia, Mesozoic animals which once thrived in the region.

== How to reach Suketi fossil park ==
From Chandigarh you can get bus facility to reach Kala Amb town 70 km away in Himachal Pradesh. From Kala Amb it is 5 km distance you can get taxi to reach.

From Ambala city you can get bus facility to reach Kala Amb 40 km away. From Kala Amb it is 5 km distance you can get taxi to reach. After crossing the Markanda River bridge toward Yamunanagar, there is a board of Himachal tourism indicate the Shivalik Fossil Park.
