= Jaitak Fort =

Fort in Himachal Pradesh, India

- Part of Himachal Pradesh
- Nahan, Himachal Pradesh, India
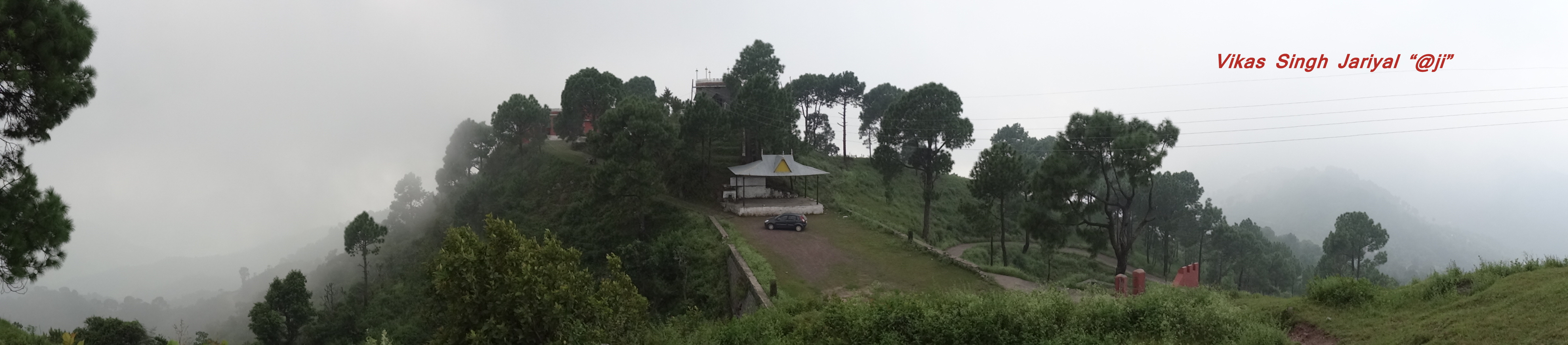
- Jaitak Fort

Site information
- Type: Fort
- Controlled by: Government of Himachal Pradesh
- Condition: Ruins

Location
- Coordinates: 30.593°N 77.331°E

Site history
- Materials: Granite Stones and lime mortar

Jaitak Fort is situated about 15 km from district headquarters Nahan in Sirmaur district in the state of Himachal Pradesh in India. Situated 1,479 meters above sea level, Jaitak Fort is notable due to its location and its view of the surrounding countryside due to its strategic setting.

== History ==
Jaitak Fort, situated in the Jaitak Hills, is believed to have been built using the material recovered from the destroyed Nahan Fort. The Jaitak Fort was built by the Gurkha leader, Ranjor Singh Thapa, and his brave men in 1810, after attacking and ransacking the Nahan Fort and Palace.

It was here that the most important battle was fought between the British forces and the Gurkhas. From the Gurkhas, Kaji Amar Singh Thapa led the Kingdom of Nepal's Army. The battle fought between 26 December 1814 to 15 May 1815. As a result, the Nepali Army defeated the British and Sirmour joint army under the leadership of Amar Singh Thapa. 600 soldiers were reported to die in this war.

== Location ==
About 15 km to the north of Nahan, Jamta falls on the Nahan-Dadahu motorable road. An ascent of about 3 km has to be negotiated form Jamta to gain Jaitak. A hill fortress one crowned the Jaitak hill which is a steep ridge of slate and which rises above the Kayarda Dun, 30–36' north and 77-24' east, in the Nahan tehsil. The elevation above the sea level is about 1479 m.

== Gallery ==
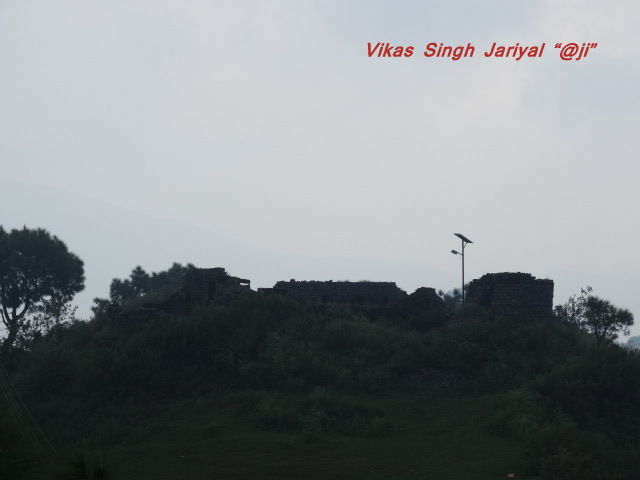
Ruins of Jaitak Fort from Haweli

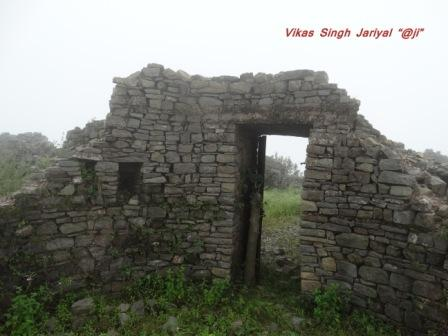
Ruins of the fort

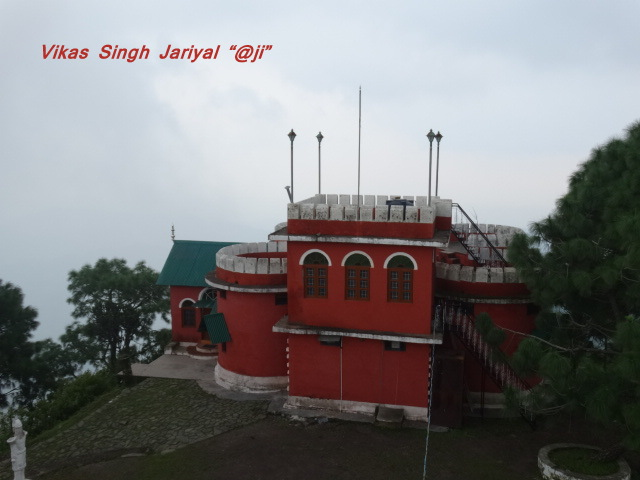
Jaitak Fort Haweli

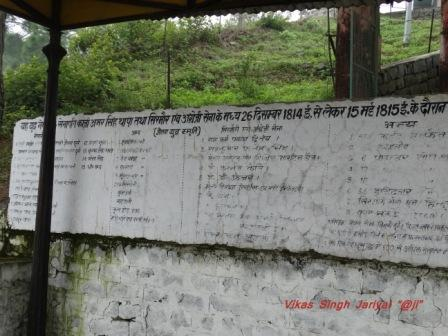
War memorial in Jaitak fort

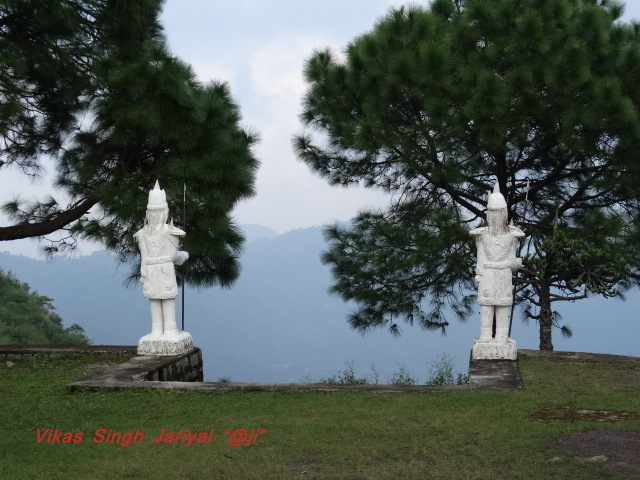
Statues in Jaitak fort
