= Bain Kuan =

Village in India

Coordinates: 30°27′17″N 77°35′22″E

Bain Kuan is a small village in Tehsil Paonta sahib, district Sirmour, Himachal Pradesh, India. It is situated at Paonta-Jamniwala road which is further connected to NH-72 at Majra. This village comes under the Jamniwala Gram Panchayat. This village is about 5 km (3.1 mi) away from the Paonta sahib. The nearest villages are Jamniwala and Kishanpura. It is on the bank of the river Bata.

Pin code: 173025 STD Code: 01704 Language: Hindi, Punjabi Time Zone: GMT+5:30 Altitude: 389m
