= Trilokpur Temple =

Hindu temple site in Himachal Pradesh, India

- त्रिलोकपुर
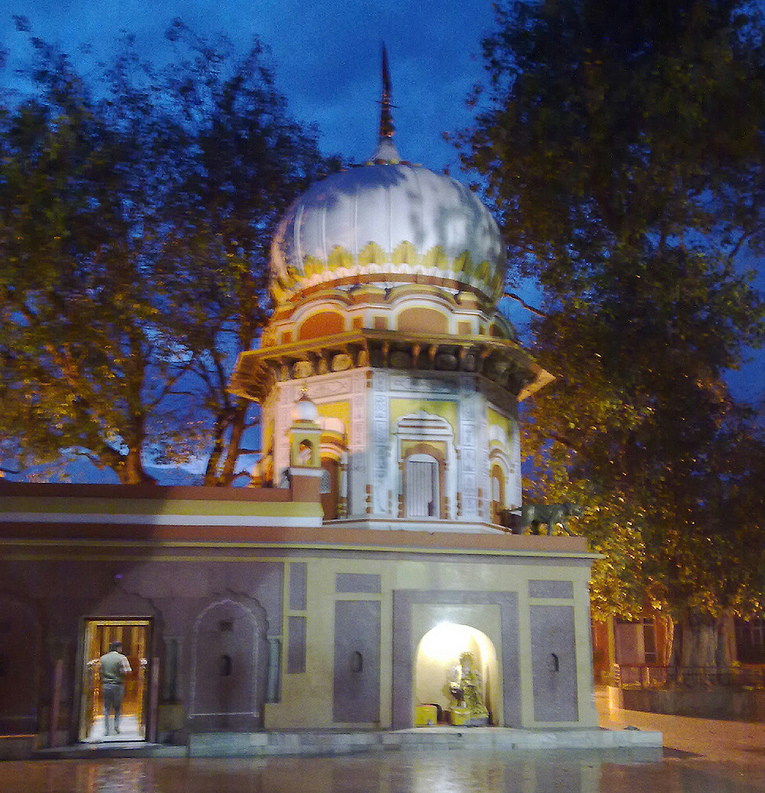
- Maa Trilokpur Devi Temple

- Location within India

Religion
- Affiliation: Hinduism
- District: sirmour
- Province: Himachal Pradesh

Location
- Country: India
- Interactive map of Trilokpur Temple
- Coordinates: 30.54035°N 77.20855°E

Trilokpur (Hindi: त्रिलोकपुर) is a Hindu temple site in Himachal Pradesh, India. It is located on an hillock about 24 km south-west of Nahan at an elevation of about 430 m. The temple is an amalgam of Indo-Persian styles of architecture.

The name Trilok Pur means a triangle of three Shakti Temples in the area. Each temple depicts a different face of the Goddess Durga. The main temple at Trilok Pur is the Temple of Bhagwati Tripur mahamaya Bala Sundry, which depicts a childhood image of Durga. The second Temple, dedicated to Bhagwati Lalita Devi, is 3 km from Bala Sundry. The third temple’ is situated 13 km northwest of Bala Sundry temple.

== History ==
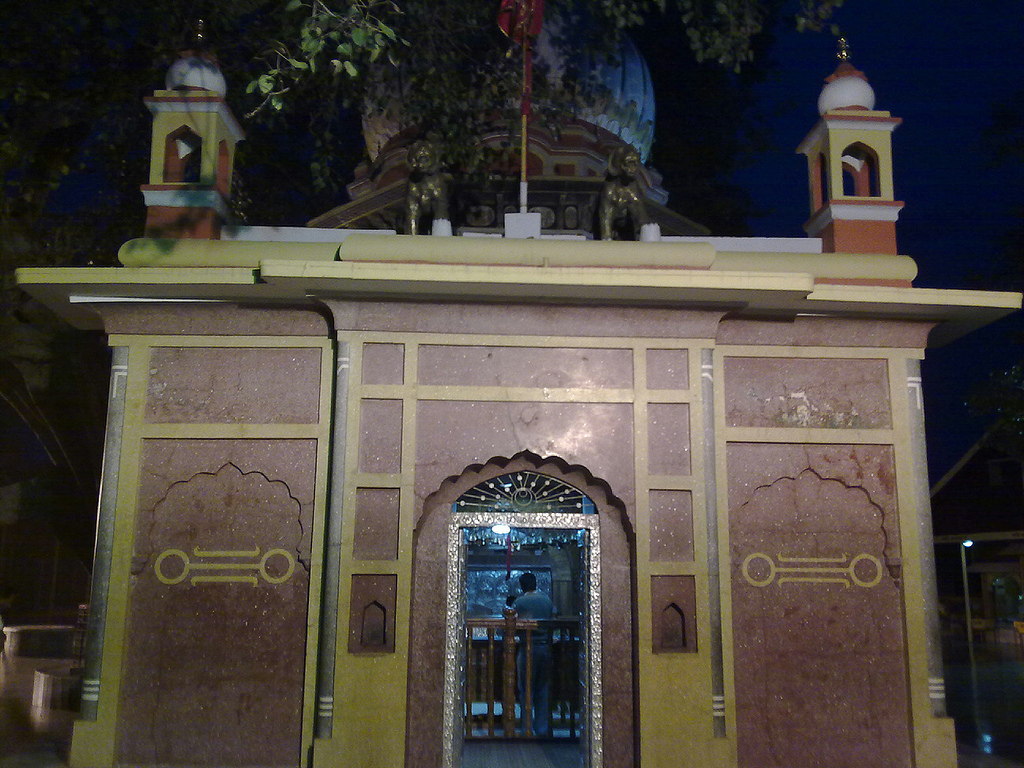
Mata Trilokpur Devi Temple

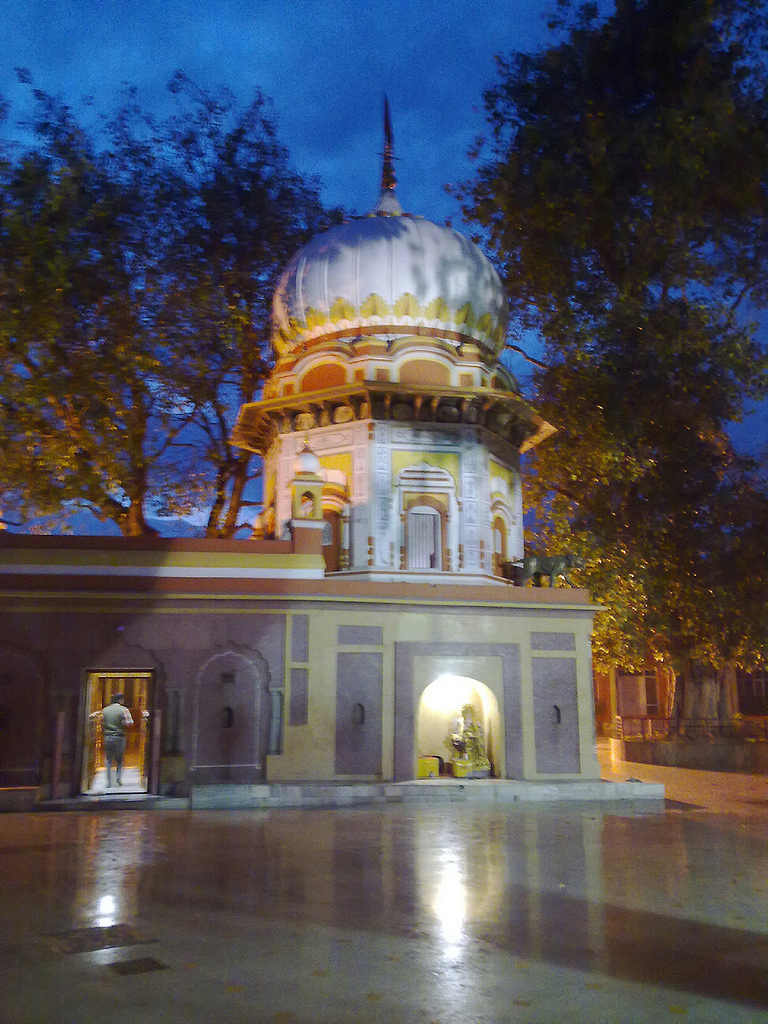
The temple, as seen from the side,

In 1570 CE, according to legend, a pindi (a sacred stone; regarded as a symbol of the goddess) appeared in a bag of salt, purchased by Sh Ram Dass. a local trader. It meant that Maa Balasundari Jee had appeared in the bag. Dass kept selling salt all day from the bag, but it always remained full. The goddess then appeared in Dass' dream. She told him how she had disappeared from Devban and instructed him to build a Temple at Trilok Pur to establish her PINDI Swaroop (which already existed inside the bag of salt). She instructed Dass also directed to worship in the name of Mahamaya Balasundari – an infant state of Goddess Vaishno Devi . Dass did not have enough money to build a temple, so he approached the ruler of Sirmour state for funding. After getting the money, Dass started building the temple.

The king invited some artisans from Jaipur in 1570 CE to create the marble temple. It was finished and dedicated to Goddess Tripura Bala Sundri in 1573 CE. After the temple was completed, the royal family started worshipping Goddess Bala Sundri.

In 1823, the temple was renovated by Maharaja Fateh Prakash and by Maharaja Raghubir Prakash in 1851.

== Current operation ==
Every year, over 32 lacs of devotees visit the temple of Bhagwati Bala Sundri. The traditional Pujari of the Bhagwati belongs to the business community and Vaish by the caste. It is another feature of this Shakti Peeth of North India. Since the temple's inception, the descendants of Lala Ram Dass have been performing the main Puja there.

At present, the temple is run by a Temple trust headed by Deputy Commissioner Sirmour. The Temple Trust had executed several developmental works in Trilok Pur village during the past three decades.

== Dhyanu Bhagat Temple ==
According to the local's beliefs, this temple houses the Hindu Goddess Jwala Ji. The Dhyanu Bhagat Temple is a major tourist attraction when visiting the shrines in Trilokpur.

== Shiva Mandir Temple ==
It is located right next to the temple of Dhyanu Bhagat's which houses the Lord Shiva.

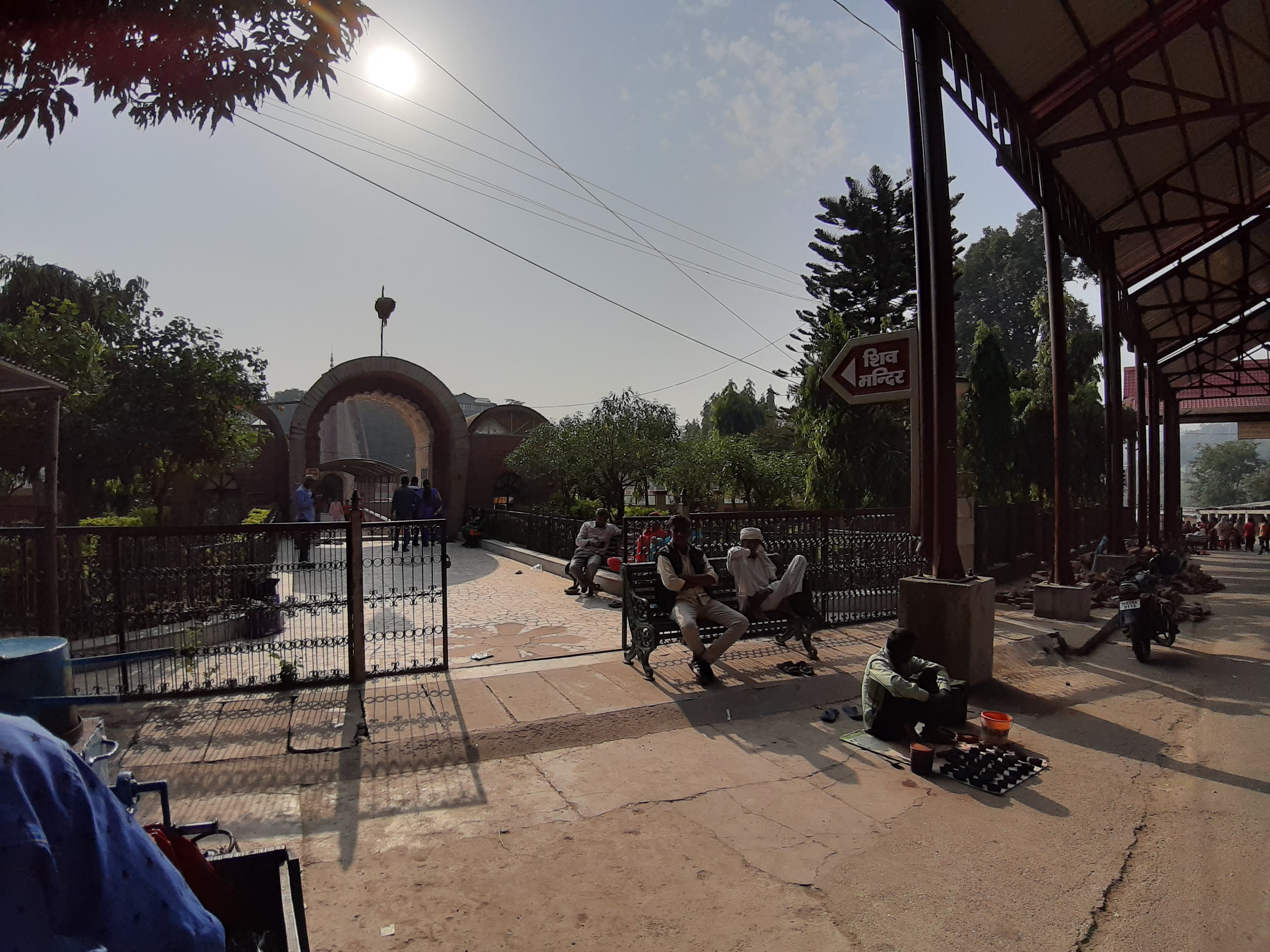
The temple of Shiva Mandir, Trilokpur

== Lalita Mata Temple ==
The gate to Lalita Mata's temple way is situated on the road to the main temple. Pilgrims often visit this temple, which is also within walking distance

== Importance ==
Trilokpur is a place of great religious importance. It is considered to be the childhood place of Maa Vaishno Devi. The temple of the goddess Mahamaya Bala Sundri ji attracts lakhs of pilgrims from all over Northern India.

An important fair is held at Trilokpur twice a year i.e.in the month of Chaitra and Ashvina on Sudi ashtmi to chaudas (from the 8th to the 14th of the bright half). During this period, people visit consistently, but a mammoth gathering is seen on ashtmi and chaudas viz, the first and final days. The mela in Chaitra draws more people than the one held in Ashvina. During this period, a large number of devotees visit this temple and pay their respects to the goddess. Mata Bala Sundri is known as Kul Devi of many castes (e.g., Kshatriyas, Brahmana, Baniyas, Jats, Kamboj, etc.) in Haryana.
