= Kala Amb =

- Town
- Location in Himachal Pradesh, India Kala Amb (India)
- Coordinates: 30.510°N 77.206°E
- Country: India
- State: Himachal Pradesh
- District: Sirmaur
- Founder: Kala Singh Ambane wala

Population
  - Total: 29,425
- Demonym: Kalambi

Languages
  - Official: Hindi
  - Regional: Puadhi, Sirmauri (Dharthi)
- Time zone: UTC+5:30 (IST)
- PIN: 173030
- Telephone code: 91-1702
- Vehicle registration: HP or sometime PB

Kala Amb is the industrial capital of the Sirmaur district in Himachal Pradesh. It is a small town and an industrial area near Nahan which is the district headquarter of Sirmaur district in the state of Himachal Pradesh, India.

At present Kala Amb has had developments in several industries. The town hosts the production of paper, metal, chemicals, thread mills and air-conditioners; causing air pollution to be a significant concern.

This town is on the border of Himachal Pradesh and Haryana, hence half of the town falls in Haryana, However the industrial area is situated in Himachal only. Kala Amb is increasing in area due to an increase in industrialization. Now the boundaries of the town have reached until the village Trilokpur which is famous for Bala Sundri Temple in northern India.

== Climate ==
Kala Amb has been ranked 39th best “National Clean Air City” under (Category 3 population under 3 lakhs cities) in India.
