= Paonta Sahib =

- City
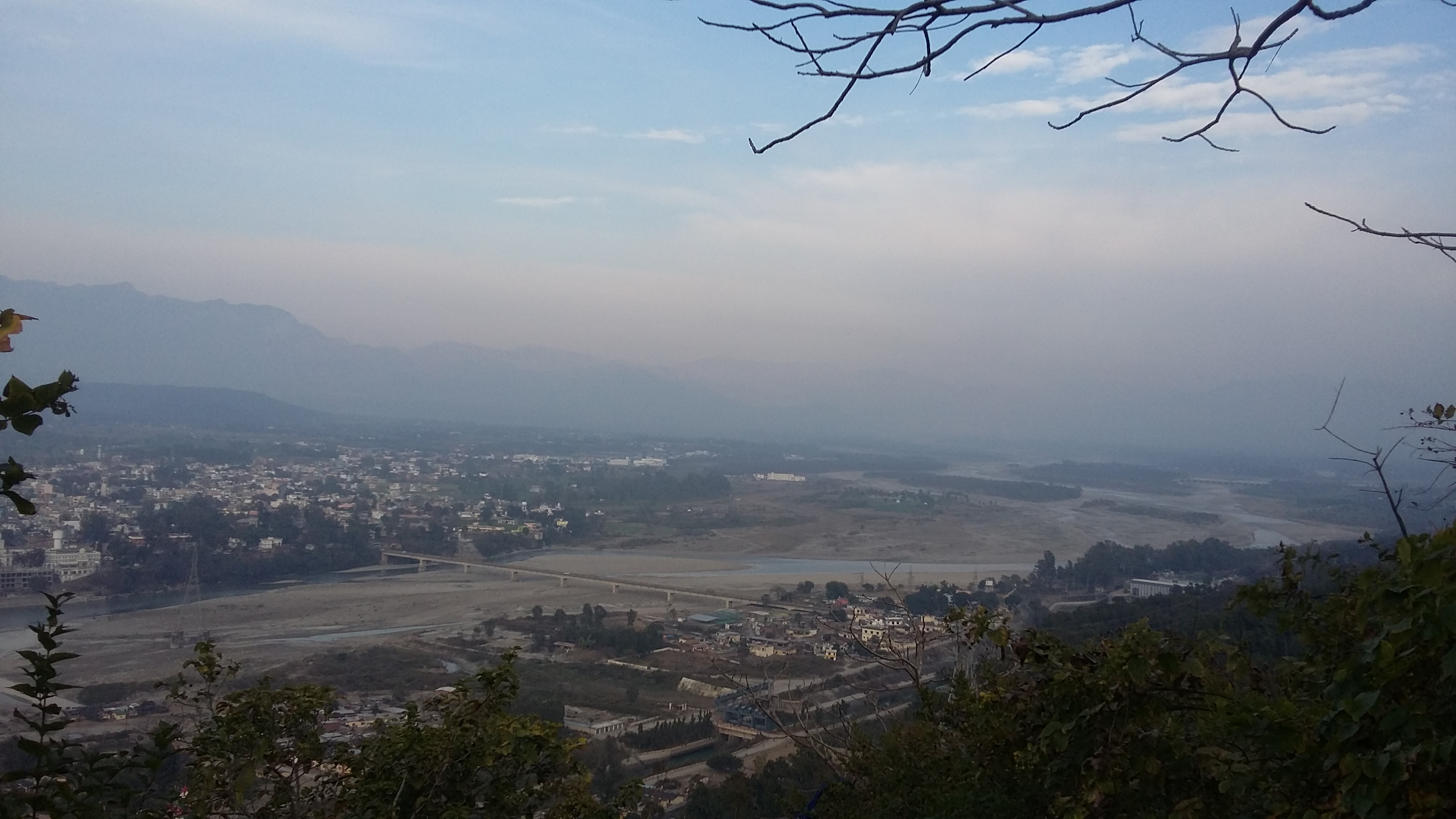
- View of Paonta Sahib from uphill with Yamuna seen flowing

- Location in Himachal Pradesh Paonta Sahib (India)
- Coordinates: 30.438°N 77.624°E
- Country: India
- State: Himachal Pradesh
- District: Sirmaur
- Municipality: Sirmaur
- Elevation: 389 m (1,276 ft)

Population (2011)
  - Total: 25,183
  - Rank: 8 in HP

Languages
  - Official: Hindi
  - Native: Sirmauri
- Time zone: UTC+5:30 (IST)
- Postal code: 173025
- Vehicle registration: HP17

Paonta Sahib is an industrial city of Himachal Pradesh in India. It is located in the south of Sirmaur district, on National Highway 72 (New NH 7) in Kyarda Doon valley. Paonta Sahib is an important place of worship for Sikhs, hosting a large Gurdwara named Gurudwara Paonta Sahib, on the banks of the river Yamuna. The river is the boundary between the states of Himachal Pradesh and Uttarakhand.

== History ==
The town was founded by Sikh Guru Shri Guru Gobind Singh in 1685. The Gurudwara Paonta Sahib has linkages to the tenth Sikh Guru, Shri Guru Gobind Singh Ji and the Sikh leader Banda Singh Bahadur. Its original name was Paontika. In Hindi language, Paon means "feet" and tika means "became stable". It is believed that Shri Guru Gobind Singh Ji and his horse stopped at this place, and he decided to stay here. He lived here for four and a half years, having never stayed so long at any other place in his entire life. He wrote many Sikh religious books during the stay and moved to Anandpur Sahib to establish the Khalsa Panth. The Gurudwara houses a museum containing antiques and weapons used by Shri Guru Gobind Singh Ji. Paonta Sahib is the birthplace of Sahibzada Ajit Singh Ji, the eldest son of Shri Guru Gobind Singh Ji.

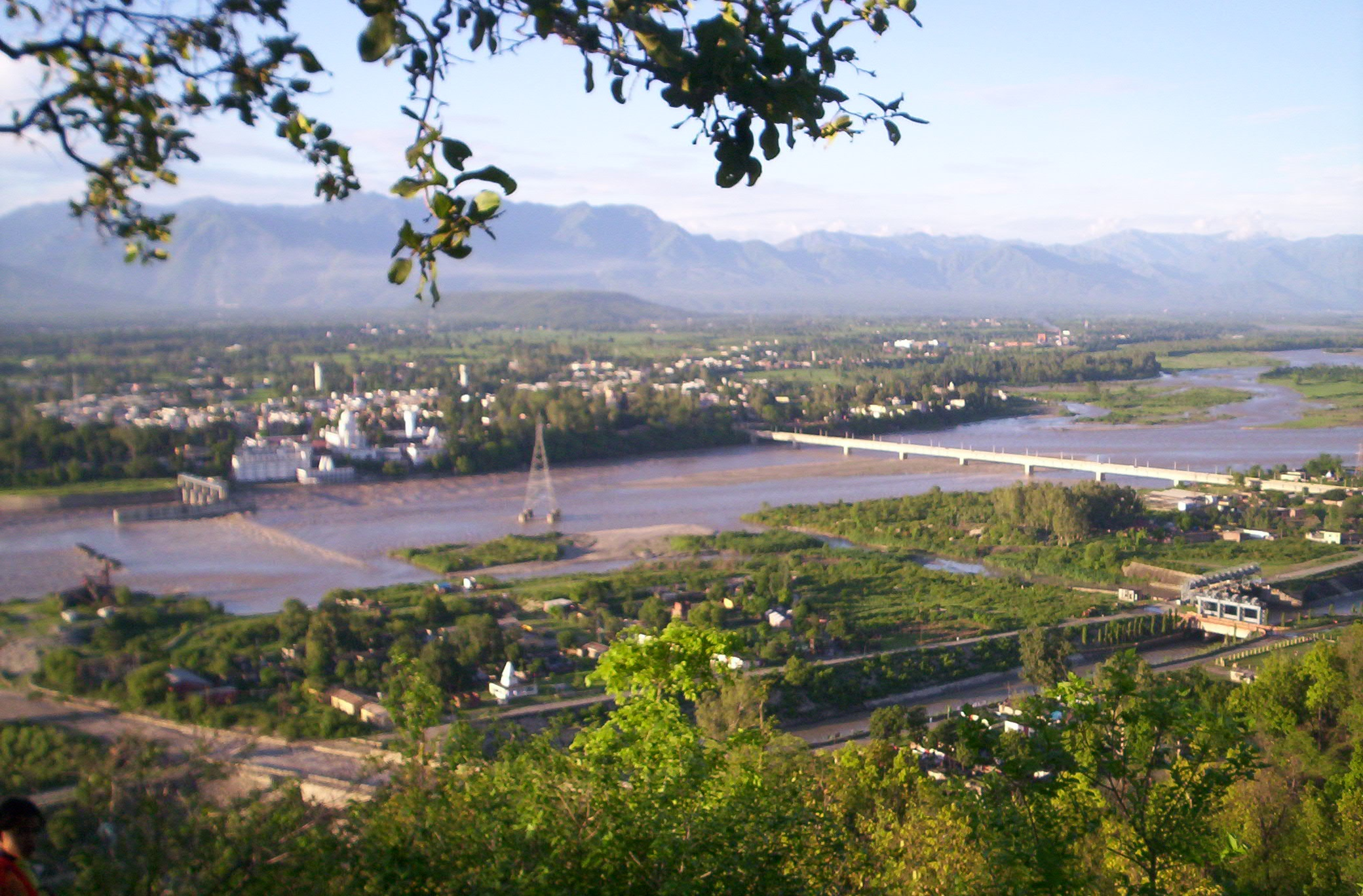
Paonta Sahib as seen from Baba Bhure Shah's Dargah on the Uttarakhand Himachal border

== Geography ==
Paonta Sahib is located at 30.438°N 77.624°E. It has an average elevation of 389 metres (1,276 feet). It is on the bank of the river Yamuna, the river being the boundary between the states of Himachal Pradesh and Uttarakhand. It is situated near the towns of Nahan in Himachal Pradesh, and at the border of Yamunanagar in Haryana, Saharanpur in Western Uttar Pradesh and Dehradun in Uttarakhand. It is on the western extreme of the Doon Valley, which is at a distance of about 44 km from Dehradun. Kalesar National Park is 12 km from Paonta Sahib. Colonel Sher Jung National Park is around 7 km from the main town. Some luxury hotels to stay in Paonta Sahib are Hotel Guru Surbhi, Hotel Yamuna, and Hotel Paonta Valley.

== Climate ==
Paonta Sahib has a sub-tropical continental monsoon climate characterised by a seasonal rhythm, hot summers, slightly cold winters, unreliable rainfall and great variation in temperature (1 °C to 40 °C). In winter, frost sometimes occurs during December and January. It also receives occasional winter rains from the western disturbance.

Average temperatures:

- Summer: Temperatures may rise to a maximum of 44 °C. The temperature generally remains 35 °C to 40 °C.
- Autumn: The temperature may go to a maximum of 36 °C. The temperature usually remains between 16 °C and 27 °C in autumn. The lowest temperature may go to 13 °C.
- Winter: Temperatures are cool and sometimes chilly. Average temperature in winters (November to February) remains at (max.) 2 °C to 7 °C and (min.) 0 °C to 5 °C.
- Spring: The climate remains quite pleasant. The temperature remains (max.) 16 °C to 25 °C and (min.) 9 °C to 18 °C.

Paonta Sahib has been ranked 40th best “National Clean Air City” under (Category 3 population under 3 lakhs cities) in India.

== Demographics ==
As of the 2011 Census of India, Paonta Sahib had a population of 25,183. Males constitute 53% of the population and females 47%. Paonta Sahib has an average literacy rate of 76%, higher than National average of 74.04% (2011 figure).: male literacy is 79%, and female literacy is 72%. In Paonta Sahib, 13% of the population is under 6 years of age.

Paonta Sahib is a municipal council which has 13 wards. This council looks after the development of the city, maintenance of roads, streets, cleanliness etc. The election takes place every five years to elect ward members and a chairman.

The Paonta Sahib tehsil comprises 141 villages, among which Bain Kuan.

Religion in Paonta Sahib
Religion	Percent
Hinduism	78.63%
Sikhism	15.01%
Islam	5.04%
Christianity	0.29%
Others	1.01%

== Industries ==
Major industries are cement (Cement Corporation of India in Rajban), power generation - renewable energy (Power Group), aviation (Air Himalayas), pharmaceutical (Sun Pharmaceutical, Mankind Pharma Limited), textiles, and chemicals. Apart from these, Asia's biggest limestone market is located at Sataun. Apart, Pharma Industry includes Tirupati Medicare Limited, Tirupati Life Sciences Pvt. Ltd., Tirupati Wellness Pvt. Ltd. and Pontika Aerotech Limited, all 4 are part of 'The Tirupati Group' in Paonta Sahib on Nahan Road.
