= Rajban =

Town in India

Coordinates: 30°31′06″N 77°39′35″E

Rajban is a small town near Paonta Sahib in the Sirmaur district in the Indian state of Himachal Pradesh.

Rajban is home to one of the oldest cement factories (Cement Corporation of India) in Himachal Pradesh. It is located on the river bank, where the Tons River and the Giri River converge. Rajban is a very small town with a dense forest adjacent to it and the high steep hills can be seen easily.

Rajban is known for its central government establishment, known as Cement Corporation of India. It employs approximately 500 workers. This industrial establishment has developed a residential colony near the plant known as C.C.I Rajaban Colony for its employees. It has various facilities including a hospital, school, small parks, and a large playground within the boundaries of the colony. Earlier Kendriya Vidyalaya Sangathan was there for the education of employees' children but with the span of time the school has been changed and now Doon Valley School provides education on the premises.

Rajban is a popular place for neighbouring people to celebrate Durga Puja and other festivals of the year. The temple La Devi also attracts a number of pilgrims throughout the year because of its vicinity. Rajban has also see growth and new residential development following the start of a Defence Research and Development Organisation project near the town.

== Climate ==
During summer the temperature of the town remains between 0 and 40 °C and in the winters it comes down to 7 °C. During winter the temperature here remains a bit mild between 18 and 27 °C.
