= List of villages in Ambala district =

This is a list of villages in Ambala district.

== Jandheri ==
- Kurali
- Ahmadpur
- Akbarpur
- Ambli
- Andheri
- Azampur
- Badhauli
- Badi Kohri
- Bakarpur
- Baktuha
- Ballopur
- Banaundi
- Bapauli
- Bara Gaon
- Bara Korwa
- Baragarh
- Barheri
- BadiBarheri
- ChhotiBasi
- BassiBari
- Rasaur
- Baroli
- Barsu Majra
- Batora
- Behloli
- Ber Kheri
- Berpura
- Bharanpur
- Bharog
- Bheron
- Bibipur
- Bichpari
- Bilaspur
- Boron
- Brahman Majra
- Budha Khera
- Bukhari
- Burj Shahid
- Chand Sauli
- Chautan
- Chechi Majra
- Chhajal Majra
- Chhajju Majra
- Chhotagarh
- Chhoti Bassi
- Chhoti Kohri
- Chhoti Rasaur
- Danora
- Dehar
- Dehri
- Dera
- Dhamauli Bichli
- Dhamauli Majri
- Dhamauli Uparli
- Dhanana
- Dudhli
- Fatehpur
- Ferozepur
- Ferozepur Kathka
- Gadauli
- Ganauli
- Ganeshpur
- Gharauli
- Haldari
- Hamidpur
- Handi Khera
- Harbon
- Hassanpur
- Husaini
- Jagatpur
- Jangoo Majra
- Jangu Majra
- Jeoli
- Jhar Sahala
- Kakar Majra
- Kalal Majra
- Kalal Majri
- Kaleran
- Kalpi
- Kalyana
- Kanjala
- Karasan
- Kathe Majra
- Khanna Majra
- Khanpur Labana
- Khanpur Brahman
- Khanpur Rajputan
- Khera Jattan
- Kherki Manakpur
- Khirki Jatan
- Khurd
- Kohra Bhura
- Korwa Khurd
- Kullarpur
- Laha
- Lakhnaura
- Lalpur
- Loton
- Magharpura
- Majra
- Manakpur
- Manglor
- Mawa Kheri
- Mianpur
- Milk
- Mirpur
- Mirzapur Kath
- Mugal Majra
- Muna Majra
- Mukand Pur
- Nabipur
- Nagal
- Nagauli
- Nagla
- Nahoni
- Nakhrauli
- Nalvi
- Nanduwali
- Nanehra
- Nangawan
- Nasrauli
- NauGawan
- Nek Nawan
- Okhal
- Panjauri
- Panjeton
- Panjlasa
- Parail
- Patrehri
- Patwi
- Pulewala
- Rachheri
- Raiwali
- Rajawali
- Rajpura
- Raju Majra
- Ramgarh
- Rampur
- Rao Majra
- Rasidpur
- Rattanheri
- Rataur
- Rerh Viran
- Sadaqpur
- Salehpur
- Salola
- Sam Bhalva
- Sangrani
- Santokhi
- Shahpur
- Shahzadpur
- Shakarpura
- Sherpur
- Shiammru
- Sian Majra
- Sontli
- Surgal
- Tandwal
- Tanka Majra
- Tapparian Rulduki
- Tapri Shahid
- Tepla
- Thamber
- Toka
- Ujjhal Majri
- Wasalpur

== See also ==
- Ambala District
- List of villages in India Tamroli
