= Sountli =

- Village
- Location within Haryana Location within India
- Coordinates: 30°25′53″N 77°00′33″E
- Country: India
- State: Haryana
- District: Ambala
- Tehsil: Naraingarh
- Sub-Tehsil: Shahzadpur, Haryana

Population (2011)
  - Total: 1,255

Languages
  - Official: Hindi
  - Second: Haryanvi
- Time zone: UTC+5:30 (IST)
- Postal Cod: 134202
- Literacy: 77.99 %

Sountli village Situated in Tehsil Shahzadpur Tehsil in Ambala District of Haryana State, India. It is located 26 km towards East from District headquarters Ambala. 3 km from Shahzadpur. 47 km from State capital Chandigarh.

== Demographics ==
Sountli has total 1356 families residing. Sountli Village has population of 1,255 of which 50.4% (633) are males and 49.6% (622) Female as per Population Census 2011. Total Literacy rate is 68.0% (854) and Female Literacy rate is 30.4% (381), Scheduled Tribes Population 0% and Scheduled Caste Population is 32.7% (410).

== Schools & Colleges ==
- Primary School 0 km
- Maa Bhagwati Niketan Public School, Shahzadpur 3.2 km
- Govt Sen Sec School Shahzadpur 4.5 km
- Govt. girls school Shahzadpur 4.5 km
- M.R.S.D. Senior Secondary School, 4.0 km
- GOVT COLLEGE FOR GIRLS, Naraingarh Road, Baragarh 8.3 km
- Icl Institute Of Management & Technology, Shahzadpur Naraingarh, Ambala, 5.0 km
- ICL Institute of Architecture, Sountli, 700M
- A.R.I. - SHAPE Rasidpur Campus for AFF/PSCRB, Dhanana-Jatwar Kaccha Rd, 6.6 km
- New Universal College Of Education, Ballopur, 13.2 km
- E-Max College of Education, Kalpi-Naraingarh Road, Village Gola, Mullana, Ambala 14.3 km

== Nearby villages ==
Pathreri 6 km, Khurd 2.4 km, Nagal 8.4 km, Dhamauli Uparli 10.6 km, Dhamauli Bichli 10.7 km, Karasan 10.9 km, Ganeshpur 12.1 km, Santokhi 12.9 km, Babak Majra 8.6 km, Korwa Khurd 7.4 km, Gharouli Narayangarh, Gharbuli 10.1 km, Behloli 7.8 km, Nasdoli 10.6 km,

== Nearby Cities ==
Shahzadpur 4.5 km, Naraingarh 15.7 km, Saha 35 km, Ambala District Headquarter 26.9 km, Barwala 22.7 km, Mullana 28.6 km, Raipur Rani21.4 km, Chandigarh 51.3 km, Dhin 34.4 km, New Delhi 230 km,

== Nearby Masjids, Mandirs and Gurudawaras ==
| Nearby Mandir & Temples | Nearby Gurudwaras | Nearby Masjid |
|---|---|---|
| Maa Vaishno Mandir, Sountli 1.7 km | Gurudwara Singh Sabha, Ambala-Dehradun-Haridwar Rd, Shahzadpur 2.1 km | Masjid Shahzadpur Haryana 4.3 km |
| Maa Vaishno Mandir, Sountli 1.7 km | Gurudwara Singh Sabha, Ambala-Dehradun-Haridwar Rd, Shahzadpur 2.1 km | Jama Masjid مسجد, TIMBER MARKET, Sadar Bazar, Ambala Haryana 24.6 km |
| Jai Kali Mata Dhanana 5.1 km | Gurudwara Sahib Sadanpur Haryana 13.2 km | Masjid wakf board, Boh, Haryana 19.0 km |
| Radha Krishan Mandir Dehradun-Haridwar Rd, Shahzadpur 4.1 km | New Chardapati Gurdwara Sahib Korwa Khurd, Haryana 7.8 km | Makka Masjid, Jogiwara, Ram Nagar, Ambala Haryana 25.2 km |
| Shri Guru Ravidass Ji Temple, Gharbuli 9.4 km, Gorakh Nath Temple, Ambala Haryana 8.5 km | Gurdwara shri harpunji sahib, Panjaton, Haryana 9.8 km | Nahoni Masjid, Northern Railway, Nahoni 20.1 km |
| Naina Devi Mandir, Pathreri, Haryana 7.1 km | Sant Nirankari Satsang Bhawan, Shahzadpur Haryana 3 km | Juma Masjid, Babyal village, Bhoormandi, Babyal village, Dhulkot, Haryana, 21.4 km |
| Shivalya- Pathreri (Shiv Mandir), Pathreri, Haryana 6.5 km | Sant Nirankari Satsang Bhawan, Shahzadpur Haryana 3 km | Masjid Mohammad Hussen Bakash, Janetpur, Haryana 19.3 km |
| Vaishno Devi Mandir, Pathreri, Haryana 6.9 km | Gurudwara Handi Khera Sahib, Dhamauli Majri, Haryana 14.1 km | Masjid, Barwala, Haryana 21.2 km |
| Shri Guru ravidass ji mandir, Shahzadpur 3.6 km | Gurudwara sahib Shyamru, shamru, 15.6 km | Masjid Lal Kurti Ambala Cantt, Haryana 24.2 km |
| Shri Raghunath Mandir, Shahzadpur 4.4 km | Gurudwara Sri Manji Sahib Ji Ambala, Haryana 26.4 km | Mullaha Khan Masjid, Grand Trunk Road (NH-1), Model Town, Ambala, Haryana 27.4 km |
| Baba Namdev Mandir, Shahzadpur 2.3 km | Gurudwara Sahib, Khera Jattan, Haryana 12.6 km | Juma Masjid, Lakhnoura, Haryana 13 km |
| Shiv Mandir, Ambala-Dehradun-Haridwar Rd, Shahzadpur | Gurudwara sahib Shyamru, shamru, Haryana 15.6 km | Madina Masjid, near, HUDA Rd, Shahpur, Haryana 35 km |

== Nearby Industry ==
- Venkys India Ltd Sountli, Haryana Distance-300M
- Shree Ganesh Pipes Indl Sountli. Distance-500m

== Nearby Banks ==
- State Bank of India, Pathreri, Haryana Distance-2.5 km
- State Bank of India, Shahzadpur, Haryana Distance-2.6 km
- Punjab & Sind Bank, Shahzadpur, Haryana Distance-3.6 km
- HDFC Bank LTD, Ambala Rd, Shahzadpur, Haryana Distance-3.3 km
- Punjab National Bank ATM, Ambala-Dehradun-Haridwar Rd, Shahzadpur, Haryana Distance-3.1 km
- Axis Bank, Khewat No 108, Ground Floor Kh No 9//20/2, 3/5, Ambala - Naraingarh Road, Banaundi, Haryana Distance-3.9 km
- Axis bank, Dhanana Rd, Dhanana, Haryana Distance-4.0 km
