= Maharishi Markandeshwar University =

Maharishi Markandeshwar University may refer to one of several universities in India named after the Hindu sage Markandeya:

- Maharishi Markandeshwar University, Mullana, a deemed university in Haryana
- Maharishi Markandeshwar University, Sadopur, a private university in Haryana
- Maharishi Markandeshwar University, Solan, a private university in Himachal Pradesh

== See also ==
- Maharishi Markandeshwar Institute of Medical Sciences and Research, Haryana, India
