= Maharishi Markandeshwar Institute of Medical Sciences and Research =

Medical college in Haryana, India

- Motto: Shaping Futures
- Type: Medical College
- Established: 1993
- Affiliations: Maharishi Markandeshwar University, NMC
- Dean: Dr. B. K. Agrawal
- Location: Mullana, Ambala district, Haryana, India; 30°15′2.75″N 77°2′42.21″E
- Campus: 240 acres (1.0 km^{2})
- Website: mmimsr.mmumullana.org

Maharishi Markandeshwar Institute of Medical Sciences and Research is situated 36 km from Ambala at Mullana in Haryana state in India. It is affiliated to Maharishi Markandeshwar University, Mullana and accredited by the National Medical Commission. The school came into existence through a Government of Haryana Legislative Act. The university imparts undergraduate (MBBS) and post graduate (MD–MS program) medical education. The campus is within the Maharishi Markandeshwar University, Mullana.

== Arya college ==
The Medical Institute offers both under graduate (MBBS) and post graduate (MD–MS program) courses, as well as diploma programmes. These courses are recognized by the National Medical Commission (NMC).

== Hospital ==
The institute has a hospital with 1020 beds including 830 teaching beds. The hospital has intensive care units, equipped with all resuscitation and monitoring equipment. There are special ICUs for Neonates and for Coronary Care. The hospital has well equipped Operation Theatres for all types of surgeries including Neuro Surgery, Urology, Pediatric Surgery, Endoscopic Surgeries and Joint Replacement. The Labour Room is established for conduct of all types of deliveries. The hospital has a Cardiology Centre with facilities for interventional cardiology. The Gastro Enterology department has facilities for ERCP and endoscopy guided interventions. The Radiodiagnosis and imaging department is equipped with 1.5 tesla MRI, 128 Slice MDCT, Digital X-Ray, Echocardiography and Mammography. The hospital laboratory is equipped to conduct all lab investigation including clinical Pathology, Hematology, Biochemistry and Microbiology. The hospital also has a Blood Bank with a component for lab, a Dialysis Unit and a Burns Unit. The hospital is empanelled by Govt. of Haryana and Rashtriya Swasthya Bima Yojna.

The institute, being located in rural area, the hospital provides services to the economically weaker sections of the society at affordable rates. The hospital also holds outreach activities regularly in the form of Medical Camps, Eye Camps, Medical Checkup Camps for school children and Health Education talks. The institute also works in close collaboration with Government Agencies in carrying out various National Health Programs.

The Institute takes keen interest in research activities. Each department has its own Research Laboratory. In additions the institute has a central research lab to co-ordinate and guide all research activities.

== Ranking ==
University and college rankings

Medical – India
- NIRF (2024): 35

Pharmacy – India
- NIRF (2024): 26

The institute was ranked 35th among medical colleges in India and 26th in Pharmacy in 2024 by National Institutional Ranking Framework (NIRF).

== See also ==
- List of medical colleges in Haryana
