= Nai Basti =

Nai Basti may refer to:

- Nai Basti, Kurukshetra
- Nai Basti, Anantnag
