= Sangrani =

Coordinates: 30°30′N 77°10′E

Sangrani is a small village of Naraingarh Tehsil, Ambala district, in the state of Haryana, India. It is situated in the foothills of the Shiwalik mountain range and on the bank of Arun River which pours along with Markanda River which is a spiritual and holy river for the local mass. As of 2011, the population of Sangrani is 1042 people.

== Education ==
The village has a middle school with a great number of student from neighboring villages.

== Location ==
The village is situated 3 km north-east from its main town Naraingarh.

== Transportation ==
The village is well connected with good roads, and is only 3 km from the bus stand of Naraingarh.

== See also ==
- Harbon
