= Maharishi Markandeshwar University, Solan =

Private university in Himachal Pradesh, India

- Motto: Shaping futures
- Type: Private
- Established: 2010
- Affiliations: UGC
- Chancellor: Tarsem Garg
- Vice-Chancellor: Dr. Ravi Chand Sharma
- Location: Laddo, Solan, Himachal Pradesh, India; 30.872°N 77.086°E
- Website: www.mmusolan.org

Maharishi Markandeshwar University, Solan (MMU Solan) is a private university located in the village Laddo near Kumarhatti, in Solan district, Himachal Pradesh, India. The university was established in 2010 by the Maharishi Markandeshwar University Trust (MMUT) through the Maharishi Markandeshwar University (Establishment & Regulation) Act, 2010. Other institutes under MMUT include Maharishi Markandeshwar University, Mullana and Maharishi Markandeshwar University, Sadopur.

== Approval ==
Like all universities in India, Indus International University is recognised by the University Grants Commission (UGC).
