= Khanna Majra =

Khanna Majra is a village in the Ambala district of Haryana, India.

== See also ==
- Harbon
