= Loton (disambiguation) =

Loton may refer to:

- Loton Park - Loton Park is a country house near Alberbury, Shrewsbury in Shropshire
- Loton - A Village in Ambala District, near Naraingarh

People

- William Loton (1838–1924), banker and politician in Western Australia
