= Ahmadpur, Ambala =

Ahmadpur
- Location in Haryana, India Ahmadpur (India)
- Coordinates: 30.4715°N 77.1098°E
- Country: India
- State: Haryana
- District: Ambala
- Established: 17th century CE

Government
  - Type: Gram Panchayat
  - Body: Gram Panchayat

Population (2011)
  - Total: 600

Languages
  - Official: Hindi
  - Additional official: English, Punjabi
- Time zone: UTC+5:30 (IST)
- PIN: 134203
- Telephone code: 91 1734
- ISO 3166 code: IN-HR
- Vehicle registration: HR-04
- Website: haryana.gov.in

Ahmadpur is a village, Village Council in the Naraingarh Tehsil of Ambala district of the Indian state of Haryana. According to a census taken in 2011, the population of the village was 600.
