= Rattanheri =

- Village
- Location within Haryana Location within India
- Coordinates: 30°21′36″N 76°55′38″E
- Country: India
- State: Haryana
- District: Ambala

Population
  - Total: 1,296 (704-Males592-Females)
- Time zone: UTC+05:30 (IST)
- Pincode: 133001

Rattanheri is a small village situated near Ambala Cantonment in Haryana, India. It forms part of Ambala district.

== Location ==
Rattanheri is 14 kilometres (8.7 mi) from its main city, Ambala-I, and 44 kilometres (27 mi) from its state capital at Chandigarh.

== Governing body ==
The village follows the Panchayat Raj system and the panchayat samiti is elected every 5 years. The elections are held under the supervision of local governing bodies.

== Other facilities ==
There is a high school in the village. Two water sources have been set up for the use of the villagers.

== See also ==
- Harbon
