= Barara =

- City
- Location within Haryana Location within India
- Coordinates: ko30.21349°N 77.03877°E
- Country: India
- State: Haryana
- District: Ambala
- Time zone: UTC+5:30
- STD: 01731

Barara is a city municipality and sub-district tehsil and development block in the Ambala district of the Indian state of Haryana.

== Geography ==
It is located 25 km from Ambala via railway and 40 km via bus.

== Education ==
Maharishi Markandeshwar University, Mullana is 3 km from Barara.

Rcc Institute of Computer Education, Barara .

== History ==
Barara was established before the colonial period.It was established by the Rana Har Rai Chauhan, a Chauhan rajpute originally from Neemrana, who had relocated to Barara from Jundla. A king of Himachal Pradesh helped develop Barara.

== Culture ==
Tajendar Singh Chouhan is in the Limca Book of Records for making the world's tallest Ravana effigy.

Barara is famous for its Dushehra mela. The world's tallest effigy of Ravan is burnt at Barara every year on the day of Dushehra. In 2016, the height of the Ravan reached 210 feet.

Barara is known for watermelon, called 'Barara di Khanda'. 'Khanda' or 'Khandsari' means sugar.

Maa Balasundri temple and Maharishi Markandeshwar temple (which is also in Tandwal, Barara) are situated nearby. Mullana is famous for education and health sectors.

Goga Jaharveer Temple is situated in Village Kambassi and is famous for the big fair on the occasion of Goga Navmi.

== Transport ==
Barara is connected by train and bus to Ambala, Jagadhri, Saharanpur, Ludhiana and Delhi.

Bus service reaches Ambala, Yamunanagar, Chandigarh, Kurukshetra and Delhi.

Private transport is connected to all nearby states, such as Delhi, UP, Uttrakhand, Punjab and Himachal Pradesh.

The railway station of Barara is antique.

== Economy ==
Banks such as SBI, ICICI, PNB, Axis, Sarva Gramin Bank, Punjab Sindh Bank, SBP, Central Bank of India, HDFC, and Canara are present.

== Demographics ==
Along with the native Haryanvis, Barara has a large population of Brahmans, Rajput and Punjabis. Immigrant populations include Nigerians and Iraqis, mostly for study.

Hindi, Haryanvi, Punjabi, and English are common languages.
