= Kardhan =

- town
- Location in Haryana, India Kardhan (India)
- Coordinates: 30.32146°N 76.85533°E
- Country: India
- State: Haryana
- District: Ambala

Population (2001)
  - Total: 9,579

Languages
  - Official: Hindi
- Time zone: UTC+5:30 (IST)
- PIN: 133006
- ISO 3166 code: IN-HR
- Vehicle registration: HR-01
- Website: haryana.gov.in

Kardhan is a census town in Ambala district in the Indian state of Haryana.

== Demographics ==
As of 2001 India census, Kardhan had a population of 9579. Males constitute 54% of the population and females 46%. Kardhan has an average literacy rate of 72%, higher than the national average of 59.5%: male literacy is 77%, and female literacy is 67%. In Kardhan, 13% of the population is under 6 years of age.
