= Nai Basti, Kurukshetra =

Nai Basti
- village
- Location in Haryana, India Nai Basti (India)
- Coordinates: 30.195546°N 76.781970°E
- Country: India
- State: Haryana

Languages
  - Official: Hindi
- Time zone: UTC+5:30 (IST)
- Postal code: 136135
- ISO 3166 code: IN-HR
- Vehicle registration: HR
- Website: haryana.gov.in

Nai Basti is a small village in Kurukshetra district in Haryana. The village is situated 12 km from Shahbad Markanda. As of the 2011 Indian Census, Nai Basti had 856 households. It is a Saini community with a single Sharma family. The village was formed in 1947 when the Saini community of nearby Nalvi decided to live in their farms.
