= Salehpur =

Village in Mullana tehsil, Ambala district, India

Salehpur is a village located in Mullana tehsil in Ambala district of Haryana state, India. Its population is over 2100. There are approximately 1000 plus authorized votes. Another village named Jamaal Majra is also under the control of Salehpur Gram Panchayat. Its geographic coordinates are 30°15’48.08” N and 77°6’18.01” E.

Late Sh. Sadhu Ram Saini continuously remained sarpanch of the village between 1962 and 2000 except for a five-year term in which his younger brother Late Sh. Panch Ram Saini headed the village.

The livelihood of people here depends primarily on agriculture and some other agriculture-related occupations. Most inhabitants belong to the saini cast, but pandit, Dalit, Rajput, Sikh, gadaria (shepherd community) and a few others like followers of Islam and Radha Swami are also quite numerable.

Salehpur falls in the Mullana constituency in the State Legislative Assembly and in Ambala constituency in Lok Sabha. Both of these constituencies are reserved for Dalit candidates only.

In the village there is a Shiva temple, Nagar Kheda, Ravidas temple, Gurudwara and a Pir-Shrine. Residents here hold a strong belief in religious activities. As a result, they ended up with two Gugga-Maadi in the village. There is also a government school up to class 5th. Literacy rate is average in the village. Very few people are in government jobs.

The village lacks basic facilities. There is no public transport except a bus which leaves the village in the morning and comes back in the evening. There is no government medical facility in the village.

It is connected with National Highway 344 (Ambala to Jagadhri) from the south side and to the road from Nahan to Shahbaad Markanda from the north-west side. However, the condition of these roads is very poor. National Highway 344 on the way to Dhin is very poorly maintained and dotted with potholes. Even after multiple requests to the government to rebuild this road, the road has mostly been neglected by the authorities. Its adjacent villages are Dhin, Ponti, Alipur, Duliana, and Duliyani.
