= Thamber =

Village in Haryana, India

Thamber is a village of Barara tehsil in Ambala district in the Indian state of Haryana. It is situated on the border of Yamunanagar.

The village play an important role in assembly elections as this village is considered influential in affecting district politics and have capacity for polarisation of votes during National and State assembly elections. However inner location of village and its ill connectivity by road mars it overall progress and development. Lately, people of this village has started migrating to urban cities for betterment in education and quality life of future generations.
