= Loton =

- Village
- Location in Haryana, India Loton (India)
- Coordinates: 30.469°N 77.138°E
- Country: India
- State: Haryana
- District: Ambala

Languages
  - Official: Hindi
  - Additional official: English, Punjabi
- Time zone: UTC+5:30 (IST)
- PIN: 134201
- Telephone code: 01734
- ISO 3166 code: IN-HR
- Vehicle registration: HR 04
- Website: haryana.gov.in

Loton, also called Lotton or Lautan a village located in Ambala District, Haryana, India. It is located near Naraingarh and situated in Naraingarh Mandal. The village panchayat has 1755 habitations with 100% Population Coverage as in 2010.

Lotton is 1 km far from Mandal and 36.1 km away from its district headquarters Ambala-I and 60 km from its state capital Chandigarh.

== See also ==
- Harbon
