= Kurali, Haryana =

Kurali
- Location in Haryana, India Kurali (India)
- Coordinates: 30°24′42″N 77°04′47″E
- Country: India
- State: Haryana
- District: Ambala
- Established: 17th century CE
- Founder: Rana ranta Singh

Government
  - Body: Gram Panchayat
  - Sarpanch: Nita Rani

Area
  - Total: 9 km^{2} (3.5 sq mi)

Population (2011)
  - Total: 4,222
  - Density: 470/km^{2} (1,200/sq mi)

Languages
  - Official: Hindi
  - Spoken: Haryanvi
- Time zone: UTC+5:30 (IST)
- PIN: 134203
- Telephone code: 91 1734
- ISO 3166 code: IN-HR
- Vehicle registration: HR-04
- Sex ratio: 853
- Literacy: 71.40%
- Website: haryana.gov.in

Kurali (also: Kurali) is a Village, Village Council in the Ambala district of the Indian state of Haryana, located 8 km South to Naraingarh.

== History ==
=== Etymology ===
The village Kurali was established by Rana Ranta Singh. It is said that Rana Ranta Singh had five brothers, and before founding Kurali, they lived in Bhereri village. Their father settled each of the brothers in different locations.

One brother was settled in Badhauli village, another in Kurali, one in Parail village, and the remaining two in Natwal village. Over time, these five villages have grown significantly in terms of population. The Rajputs from these villages share a common lineage originating from the same ancestral village.

== Demographics ==
=== Population ===
Kurali is a Village located in Ambala district of Haryana.

As per the Census India 2011, Kurali Village has 770 households, population of 4,222 of which 2,278 are males and 1,944 are females. The population of children between age 0-6 is 620 which is 14.68% of total population.

The sex-ratio of Kurali Village is around 853 compared to 879 which is average of Haryana state. The literacy rate of Kurali is 71.4% out of which 76.53% males are literate and 65.38% females are literate. The total area of Kurali is 9 km^{2} with population density of 470 per km^{2}.

=== Religion ===
Hinduism is the prominent religion of Kurali followed by 93.36% of the population. Sikhism is the second most popular religion in the city followed 4.64% of the people. In Kurali Islam is followed by 1.75% and those that didn't state a religion are 0.25%.

=== Languages ===
Hindi and Haryanvi is the official language of Kurali. English is an additional official language. Government schools use English and Hindi textbooks.

== Gallery ==
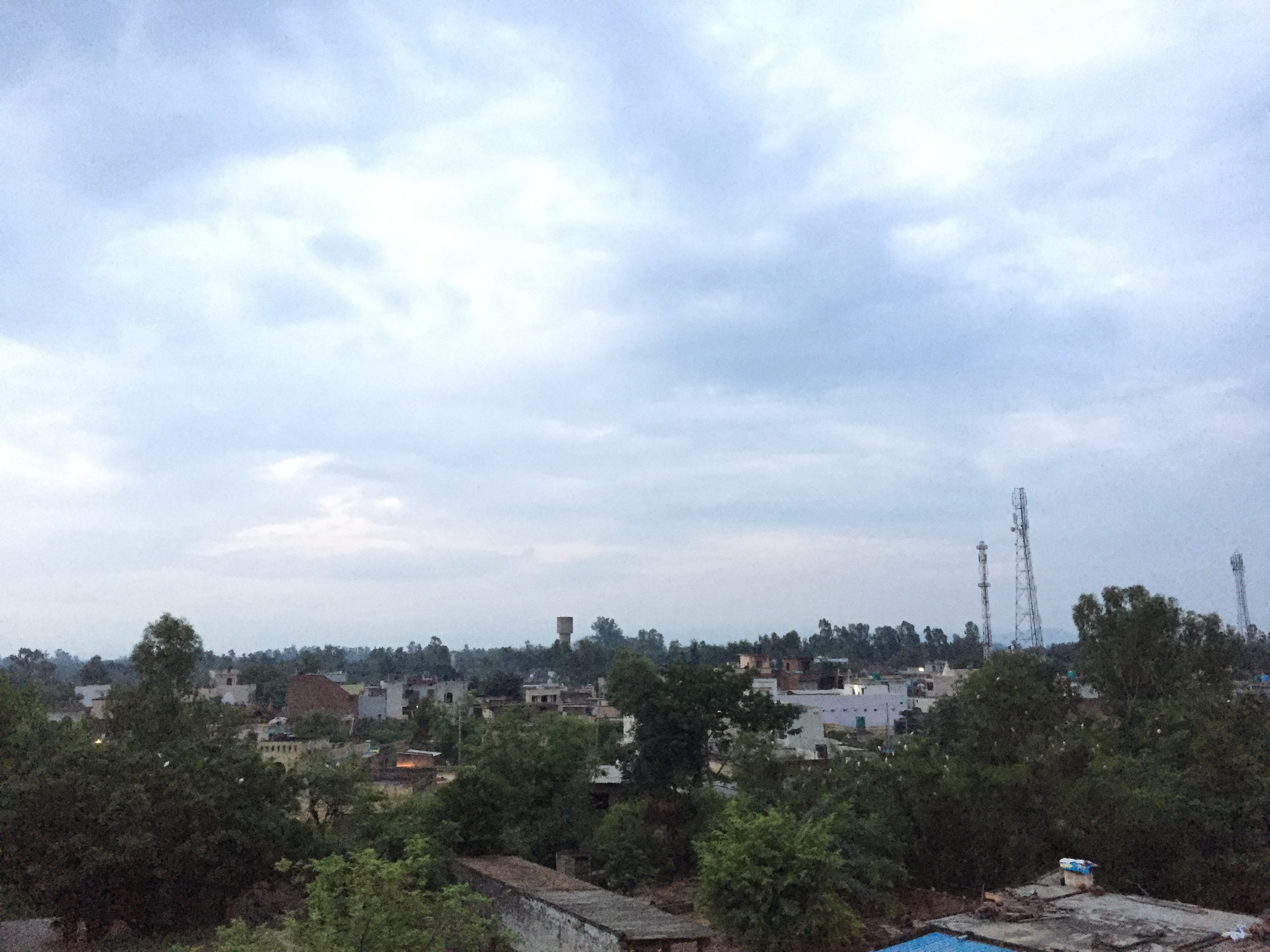
Aerial View of Kurali(B.S)
