= Badhauli =

- Location in Haryana, India Badhauli (India)
- Coordinates: 30°35′42″N 77°04′47″E
- Country: India
- State: Haryana
- District: Ambala
- Founder: Badhawa Singh

Government
  - Body: Gram Panchayat

Area
  - Total: 10.51 km^{2} (4.06 sq mi)

Population (2011)
  - Total: 4,422
  - Density: 420.7/km^{2} (1,090/sq mi)

Languages
  - Official: Hindi
  - Spoken: Haryanvi (Puadhi)
- Time zone: UTC+5:30 (IST)
- PIN: 134203
- Telephone code: 91 1734
- ISO 3166 code: IN-HR
- Vehicle registration: HR-04
- Literacy: 65.20%
- Website: haryana.gov.in

Badhauli is a village of Naraingarh tehsil of Ambala district of Haryana. The village is situated on the bank of river Begna. According to the 2011 Census, there were 747 families residing in the village and its population was 4,442, of whom 2,346 were males and 2,096 were females.

== History ==
The village named after or founded by a man Badhawa Singh. Before Badhawa Singh the name of the village was Sakhredi. The village was under the Princely state of Sirmur until the king Jassa Singh Ahluwalia of Kapurthala state captured the northern Haryana during 1754/55. After his death on 20 October 1783, his nephew Bagh Singh Ahluwalia became the ruler and after his death on 10 July 1801, his son Fateh Singh Ahluwalia became the ruler and ruled till his death on 20 October 1837. In his period, during 1806 and 1808, a revolution outbreak in some parts of northern Haryana against Kapurthala state.(This revolution can't be suppressed by the Kapurthala state because Kapurthala was and is very far away from Ambala.) In Badhauli, Bawa Ram Prasad, a saint, shoot out the Sikh quiladaar of the village, this is the revolution which outbreaks in Badhauli. By the revolution of the northern Haryana, the king of Kapurthala gave the northern Haryana to the direct control of Maharaja Ranjit Singh. After Maharaja' s death on 27 June 1839, the Sikh Empire lead to decline and finally, fully declined in March 1848 and village Badhauli and all the Punjab came under the control of Britishers till 14/15 August 1947.

Partap Singh Kairon, the chief minister of punjab also visited the village during his chief ministership.
