= Sanskriti University =

Private university in Uttar Pradesh, India

- Type: Private university
- Established: 2016
- Accreditation: NAAC accredited
- Affiliations: UGC, AICTE, AIU, ACU, BCI, PCI, NCTE, NCISM, INC, RCI, ICAR, DSIR, SIRO
- Chancellor: Dr. Sachin Gupta
- Faculty: 400+
- Students: 10,000+
- Location: 28 K.M. Stone, Mathura-Delhi Highway, Mathura, Uttar Pradesh, India
- Campus: 40+ Acres
- Website: www.sanskriti.edu.in

Sanskriti University is a private university located in Mathura, Uttar Pradesh, India. Established in 2016 under the Uttar Pradesh Private University Act, the university is recognised by the University Grants Commission (UGC) under section2(f) and has the right to confer degrees as per section 22(1) of the UGC Act, 1956. It is accredited by the National Assessment and Accreditation Council (NAAC). The university is spread across a 40-acre green campus on National Highway 19(Mathura-Delhi Highway). Sanskriti University offers diploma, undergraduate, postgraduate, and doctoral programmes across schools and institutes spanning engineering, management, law, pharmacy agriculture, medicine(Ayurveda), nursing, education, sciences, and the humanities. The university is a member of the Association of Indian Universities(AIU), and holds approvals from multiple statutory councils including AICTE, BCI, PCI, NCTE, INC, RCI, NCISM, and ICAR

== History ==
=== Foundation (2016) ===
Sanskriti University was established in 2016 by a group of eminent philanthropists under the Uttar Pradesh Private University Act. The founding vision was to create an institution that would provide holistic, industry-oriented higher education in the Braj region of western Uttar Pradesh — an area historically underserved by quality higher education infrastructure. The university was set up on a 40-acre campus along the Mathura–Delhi National Highway (NH-19) in Chhata, Mathura.

=== Growth and development ===
Since its establishment, Sanskriti University has grown steadily in terms of academic offerings, student enrolment, and institutional recognition. Within its first few years of operation, the university established 14 schools and institutes across diverse disciplines. It received NAAC accreditation, became a member of the AIU and ACU, and received statutory approvals from multiple councils including AICTE, UGC, BCI, PCI, NCTE, INC, RCI, and NCISM..

The university established an Institution Innovation Council (IIC) under the Ministry of Education's innovation framework. It also set up a Centre of Excellence in collaboration with the Ministry of MSME, focussing on Robotics, Automation, IoT, and Cloud Computing, serving students from the Mathura–Agra region.

=== Research and innovation ===
Faculty members have collectively published over 2,700 research papers and filed more than 3,200 patents as of 2026. The Ministry of Commerce & Industry ranked Sanskriti University 6th in India for filing the highest number of patent applications. The university was also ranked among the top 100 universities globally in the Times Higher Education (THE) Interdisciplinary Science Rankings 2026.

== Academics ==
=== Schools and institutes ===
Sanskriti University organises its academic programmes across schools and institutes. The following table lists all schools and their principal programmes:

#	School / Institute	Key Programmes Offered
1	School of Engineering & Information Technology	B.Tech (CSE, ECE, ME, CE, DS, AI/ML, etc.), BCA, MCA, M.Tech, Ph.D
2	School of Management & Commerce	BBA, MBA, B.Com, M.Com, Ph.D
3	School of Pharmacy	B.Pharm, M.Pharm, D.Pharm
4	School of Law & Legal Studies	BA LLB, B.Com LLB, LLM
5	School of Agriculture	B.Sc. Agriculture, M.Sc. Agronomy, Horticulture
6	Sanskriti Ayurvedic PG Medical College	BAMS, MD (Ayurveda)
7	School of Nursing	B.Sc. Nursing, ANM, GNM
8	School of Education	B.Ed., M.Ed., D.El.Ed., Ph.D
9	School of Allied & Healthcare Professionals	B.MIRT, B.AOTT, BPT, MPT, BMLS
10	School of Basic & Applied Sciences	B.Sc. (Physics, Chemistry, Maths, Bio, Biotech, Forensic), M.Sc., Ph.D
11	School of Design	B.Des Animation & Visual Effects, B.Des Fashion Design
12	School of Naturopathy & Yogic Science	BNYS
13	University Polytechnic	Diploma Programs (CSE, ME, Civil, EE)
14	School of Rehabilitation	B.Ed. Special Education (ID | HI), D.Ed. Special Education VI*

=== Admission & Entrance Examinations ===
The university conducts its own entrance examination — the Sanskriti University National Aptitude Test (SUNAT) — for admission to various undergraduate and postgraduate programmes. SUNAT qualifiers are also eligible for merit-based scholarships, including up to 100% tuition fee to meritorious scholarship. For professional programmes, the university additionally accepts scores from national examinations:

- Engineering (B.Tech): JEE Main
- Medical / BAMS: NEET UG
- Management (MBA): CAT / MAT / XAT / NMAT / CMAT
- Law (BA LLB / BBA LLB): CLAT / CUET
- All UG Programmes: CUET (Central University Entrance Test)

=== Research ===
The university has established an active research culture, with over 2,700 research papers published and more than 3200 patents filed by its faculty. The Department of Scientific and Industrial Research (DSIR) has recognised Sanskriti University as a Scientific and Industrial Research Organisation (SIRO). The university has a dedicated research repository through ShodhGanga / INFLIBNET Centre.

== Accreditation, Recognition & Rankings ==
=== Accreditations & Statutory Recognitions ===
Sanskriti University holds the following accreditations and statutory recognitions:

- NAAC (National Assessment and Accreditation Council) – Accredited
- UGC (University Grants Commission) – Recognised under Sections 2(f) and 22(1) of the UGC Act, 1956
- AICTE (All India Council for Technical Education)
- BCI (Bar Council of India) – School of Law
- PCI (Pharmacy Council of India) – Institute of Pharmaceutical Sciences
- NCTE (National Council for Teacher Education) – School of Education
- INC (Indian Nursing Council) – School of Nursing
- NCISM (National Commission for Indian System of Medicine) – Ayurvedic Medical College
- RCI (Rehabilitation Council of India) – Special Education
- ICAR (Indian Council of Agricultural Research) – School of Agriculture
- DSIR (Dept. of Scientific & Industrial Research) – SIRO recognition
- AIU (Association of Indian Universities) – Professional Member
- ACU (Association of Commonwealth Universities) – Member
- IIC (Institution Innovation Council) – Established under Ministry of Education
- ISO Certification – Quality Management

=== Rankings ===
The following table summarises Sanskriti University's performance across major Indian and international ranking frameworks:

Ranking body / award	Category	Rank / recognition
NIRF (Ministry of Education)	Innovation	Band 101–150 (2023)
Times BSchool 2024	Top Emerging Management Institutes in India	1st
Outlook ICARE Ranking 2024	Top Private Universities in Uttar Pradesh	3rd
Outlook India 2025	Top Private Universities – Constituent Colleges	35th
Business India Magazine 2023–24	AAA+ Rated B-School in Uttar Pradesh	AAA+
Careers360	Best B-Schools in Uttar Pradesh	AAA+
IIRF Ranking 2024	Top Private Universities in India (Overall)	151st
THE Interdisciplinary Science Rankings 2026	Global University Rankings	Top 100 Globally
Ministry of Commerce & Industry	Highest Patent Applications Filed in India	6th
The Economic Times	ET Young Industry Leaders Award 2025	India's Leading Industry-Oriented University
The Week – Hansa Research Survey 2025	Engineering Colleges	165th
IIC (MoE Innovation Cell)	Institution Innovation Council	Established

== Campus and infrastructure ==
=== Location and setting ===
The main campus of Sanskriti University is situated at 28 K.M. Stone, Mathura–Delhi Highway, Mathura, Uttar Pradesh – 281 401. The campus is approximately 150 km from Delhi NCR, 10 km from Vrindavan, making it easily accessible from the national capital region.

=== Campus facilities ===
The 40-acre green campus includes the following facilities:

- Academic Blocks with state-of-the-art classrooms, smart lecture halls, and seminar rooms
- Central Library with a wide collection of textbooks, journals, reference books, and digital databases
- Advanced Science, Engineering & Medical Laboratories
- Centre of Excellence in Robotics, Automation, IoT & Cloud Computing (in collaboration with MSME)
- Sanskriti Ayurvedic PG Medical College & Hospital — a dedicated teaching hospital
- Hostels with capacity for 2,000+ students (separate for boys and girls)
- Sports Complex including outdoor and indoor sports facilities
- Wi-Fi enabled campus with high-speed internet connectivity
- Auditorium and Cultural Activity Centre
- Cafeteria / Canteen
- Student Resource & Career Development Centre

== Collaborations and memoranda of understanding ==
Sanskriti University has established collaborations with international institutions, government organisations, and corporate partners for academic exchange, research, training, and skill development.

=== International collaborations ===
Institution	Nature of collaboration
University of Cambridge	Faculty exchange, student exchange, and research collaboration
HELP University, Malaysia	Academic and research collaboration
University of Fredericton, Canada	Student and faculty exchange
EC Council University, United States	Cybersecurity education
Universidad Abierta Interamericana, Argentina	Academic collaboration
Bahir Dar University, Ethiopia	Research and academic exchange
Euclid University (Pôle Universitaire Euclide)	Joint Programmes and Student Exchanges

==== National and government collaborations(MoUs) ====
Institution	Focus area
ICAR – NBPGR, IIMR, IIOR and IIRR (Hyderabad)	Research and training under the Indian Council of Agricultural Research
(NSDC) National Skill Development Corporation	Skill development programmes
MSME – Centre of Excellence	Robotics, automation, IoT, and cloud computing
ICT Academy (Govt. of India PPP)	Faculty and student development
(SAFIC) Sri Aurobindo Foundation for Indian Culture	Indian Cultural Studies programme
Santhigiri Ashram	Ayurvedic education and training
ShodhGanga / INFLIBNET Centre	Research repository

==== Corporate collaborations ====
Company / platform	Purpose
TCS iON	Technology-enabled learning
Coursera for Campus	Online certification courses
Tata Steel	Industry connect and placements
upGrad	Professional and continuing education
Skilling You Pvt. Ltd.	Soft skills and life skills training
Pearson VUE	International certification testing
CYPE Software	Engineering software training
ESI Sports India Limited	Sports education

== Placements and industry connect ==
Placement metric	Details
Overall placement rate	89%
Highest package (2025)	INR 1.4 crore (MBA student)
Average package	INR 6.20 LPA
Median package (NIRF 2025 data)	INR 3.60 LPA
Recruiters on campus	200+ companies
Diploma / MBA / BBA / M.Tech placements	100% placement reported
Training and Placement Cell	Dedicated T&P Cell with year-round operations

Notable Recruiters: Nestle, Wipro, Genpact, TCS, TATA Motors, Larsen & Toubro, Radisson Hotels, Cream Bell, Just Dial, Patanjali, and 200+ others

== Awards and Recognition ==
- The Economic Times: ET Young Industry Leaders 2025 Award
  - Recognised as India's Leading Industry-Oriented University - https://www.aninews.in/news/business/et-young-industry-leaders2025-celebrates-business-leaders20251229170817/
- 1st Ranked – Top Emerging Management Institutes in India Times BSchool 2024: -
  - https://timesbschoolsurvey.org/mba/assets/pdf/Times-B-School-Archives-2024.pdf
- 6th Ranked – Highest Number of Patent Applications Filed in India Ministry of Commerce & Industry:
- 3rd Among Private Universities in Uttar Pradesh Outlook ICARE Ranking 2024:
  - https://www.outlookindia.com/education/top-50-state-private-universities-2
- AAA+ Rated B-School in Uttar Pradesh Business India Magazine 2023–24:
- 7th in Hotel Management | 40th in Top General Private Universities India Today Rankings 2025:
- https://bestcolleges.indiatoday.in/universities-rank/general-pvt
- https://bestcolleges.indiatoday.in/emerging-colleges/hotel-management

Established under MoE's Innovation Cell – recognising innovation ecosystem IIC (Institution Innovation Council):
