= Nai Basti, Anantnag =

Coordinates: 33.738°N 75.142°E

Nai basti نئ بستى is a neighborhood located in Anantnag district, Jammu and Kashmir, India. It is the hub of coaching institutes and schools. It is located half a kilometer from Lal Chowk, the nerve of the town. It is the Gateway of Anantnag town. NH-1B passes through Nai Basti area.

The Important educational establishments in the area are:

1. Euro Presentation
2. Hista Hr secondary
3. Saint Xains International School
4. New Era High School
5. Blossom Public School
6. Euro Kids.

It also has few private hospitals:-
1. Al Noor hospital
2. Gousia hospital 3. Mid City hospital

Nai basti was in the news for wrong reasons in February 2026, when some drug peddlers were arrested from the area.
