= Shahzadpur, Haryana =

Shahzadpur
- Town
- Location in Haryana, India Shahzadpur (India)
- Coordinates: 30°26′46″N 77°02′00″E
- Country: India
- State: Haryana
- District: Ambala

Population (2011)
  - Total: 7,278

Languages
  - Official: Hindi, Regional Haryanvi
- Time zone: UTC+5:30 (IST)
- PIN: 134202
- Area code: 0184
- Vehicle registration: HR-04

Shahzadpur is a Town in Shahzadpur Tehsil in Ambala District of Haryana State, India. It belongs to Ambala Division . It is located 30 km towards East from District headquarters Ambala. It is a Tehsil headquarter. Shahzadpur Pin code is 134202 and postal head office is Shahzadpur.

== Demographics ==
Shahzadpur is a Town located in Naraingarh of Ambala district, Haryana with total 1356 families residing. Shahzadpur has population of 7,278 of which 3,888 are males while 3,390 are females as per Population Census 2011.

In Shahzadpur population of children with age 0-6 is 841 which makes up 11.56% of total population of village. Average Sex Ratio of Shahzadpur is 872 which is lower than Haryana state average of 879. Child Sex Ratio for the Shahzadpur as per census is 730, lower than Haryana average of 834. Shahzadpur has higher literacy rate compared to Haryana.

In 2011, literacy rate of Shahzadpur village was 85.41% compared to 75.55% of Haryana. In Shahzadpur Male literacy stands at 90.68% while female literacy rate was 79.51%. As per constitution of India and Panchyati Raaj Act, Shahzadpur is administrated by Sarpanch who is elected representative of town.

== Education ==
There are a number of high Schools in Shahzadpur, providing both English and Hindi education. Among these are the Government Senior Secondary School (which has both a boys only and a girls only students) and, M.R.S.D Senior Secondary School, Maa Bhagwati Niketan Public School and Growing Tree Play School (which all provide English and Hindi education).
