= Nahoni =

- Location in Haryana, India
- Coordinates: 30°33′11″N 77°0′37″E
- District: Ambala
- Settled: Ancient

Government
  - Governor: Kaptan Singh Solanki

Languages
  - Official: Hindi
- Time zone: UTC+5:30 (IST)
- PIN: 133104

Nahoni is the notified area and village in Saha tehsil, Ambala district in the Indian state of Haryana. The village is surrounded by Baduali village in north, Kalpi towards west and south and Mullana towards east. The postal code of the area is 133104.

== Geography ==
Nahoni is surrounded by Shahzadpur Tehsil to the North, Mustafabad Tehsil to the East, Shahbad Tehsil to the South and Barara Tehsil to the South. Gola, Khera, Gokalgarh, Hema Majra, Saha, Tumroli, Baduali are nearby villages.

== Education ==
- Krishna Senior Secondary School
- Gurunanak Dev Khalsa Middle School
- Shri Sardar Lal College of Education
- E-Max School of Engineering and Applied Research
- Saraswati Bal Niketan Middle School
- Girls Senior Secondary School, Nahoni
- Ravi Adarsh Middle School
- Krishna Senior Secondary School
- Gurunanak Dev Khalsa Middle School
- Govt. sr. sec school, nahoni
