= Maharishi Markandeshwar University, Sadopur =

Private university in Haryana, India

Coordinates: 30°25′24″N 76°46′30″E

- Motto: Shaping Futures
- Type: Private
- Established: 2010
- Affiliations: UGC, AICTE, COA
- Chancellor: Tarsem Garg
- Vice-Chancellor: Dr. B. Sridhar Reddy
- Location: Sadopur, Ambala, Haryana, India
- Mascot: Shivaling with Markandeshwar ji
- Website: www.mmambala.org

Maharishi Markandeshwar University, Sadopur (MMU Sadopur) is a private university at Sadopur, Ambala district, near the city of Ambala, in the state of Haryana, India. It was established by the Maharishi Markandeshwar University under the provisions of the Haryana Private Universities Act, 2006, and legislated under Haryana Govt. Act No. 29 of 2010.

== Academics ==
The university offers various undergraduate and postgraduate programmes of study.

=== Accreditation ===
Like all universities in India, the university is recognised by the University Grants Commission (UGC). It is also approved by the All India Council for Technical Education (AICTE) and the Council of Architecture (COA).

== Campus ==
In the campus there is a Punjab National Bank branch, a Bharat Petroleum petrol outlet and an auditorium with seating capacity of about 200 and 250 persons respectively.

== Rankings ==
University and college rankings

Medical – India
- NIRF (2024): 35

The university is ranked 35th among medical colleges in India in 2024 by the National Institutional Ranking Framework medical ranking.
