= MD–MS program =

Dual degree graduate school program

An MD–MS program is a dual degree graduate school program awarding both a Doctor of Medicine (M.D.) degree and a Master of Surgery (M.S.) degree. Post-graduate diploma holders and Diplomate of National Board (India) candidates can upgrade to an MD-MS admission 2019-20 degree through opportunities such as post-graduate–up-gradation programs.

== Description ==
An MD-MS Program is a tutor-based program in which students are trained by research professionals on modern innovations in the healthcare industry. The MD-MS degree is designed for people who intend to pursue clinical practice and want to develop their research skills in a related area of engineering. It is well suited for students who desire a better understanding of the types of technology they may employ as practicing physicians. The MD-MS degree program provides a funded research experience in engineering that is expected to lead to research publishing. The program also provides practice in engineering design and analysis. The entire course is developed to be mentor-based, enabling the students to be coached by experts attached to a recommended medical center. Most of the courses take place online, via distance learning, leaving professionals free to study without leaving their jobs.

=== Eligibility ===
- Candidates who have appeared and cleared the Diplomate of National Board (DNB) exams
- Doctors with a post-graduate diploma/degree can study for the PG-up-gradation program

=== Duration ===
Requirements for the combined MD and master's degrees are equivalent to those of the separate degrees of the Doctor of Medicine of the School of Medicine and the specific Master of Science degree at a particular campus. The dual degree program can usually be completed within five years.

=== Evaluation ===
Evaluation of the course is assessed by the guide and university through thesis/dissertation submitted by the student based on their research project done.

== Examples ==
Biomedical Informatics (BMI) applies statistical techniques and technologies to the medical and health sciences.

Epidemiology involves the study of disease — and the predisposing conditions for disease — among human populations in all parts of the world, with an emphasis on approaches to improving levels of health. The MS Program in Epidemiology is presented by the Department of Health Research and Policy (HRP) at the School of Medicine.

Health Services Research (HSR) is concerned with the analysis of health policy in the public and private sectors. The MS Program in HSR is part of the Department of Health Research and Policy (HRP) at the School of Medicine.

Masters of Medicine (MOM) includes experience in clinical medicine with a view to foster translational research. Students who pursue the MS in Medicine while engaged in their doctoral programs will be highly knowledgeable about human biology and disease, and thus more able to translate scientific discoveries into useful medical advances.

Masters of Human Genetics and Genetic Counseling is a program that trains students to understand the molecular, clinical and psychological implications of differences in the human genome, and to translate these intricacies to health care professionals, laboratory researchers and patients/families. Graduates of this program will be eligible for board certification by the American Board of Genetic Counselling.

== See also ==
- Graduate Medical Program
- MD-PhD
