= Mullana =

Mullana Mulana
- Town
- Location in Haryana, India Mullana (India)
- Coordinates: 30.1502°N 77.0242°E
- Country: India
- State: Haryana
- District: Ambala
- Named for: Mata Bala Sundri Mandir, Green Valley Resort, MMU Mullana, Rajputana.

Government
  - Type: Rural
  - Body: Panchayat
- Elevation: 264 m (866 ft)

Population (2011)
  - Total: 8,000[approx]

Languages
  - Official: Hindi
  - Regional: Haryanvi
- Time zone: UTC+5:30 (IST)
- PIN: 133203
- Telephone code: 01731
- ISO 3166 code: IN-HR
- Vehicle registration: HR54(private), HR37(commercial)
- Sex ratio: 869/1000
- Website: ambala.nic.in

Mullana is a town, near city of Ambala in Ambala district in the state of Haryana, India. The town is located on the border with the state of Punjab and in proximity of the state capital Chandigarh. The original name of Mullana was Devi Garh—in reference to nearby ancient temples.

It is also an assembly constituency and the location of Maharishi Markandeshwar University, Mullana, Green Valley Resort and Mangal Farms.
