= Maharishi Markandeshwar University, Mullana =

Deemed University in Haryana, India

Maharishi Markandeshwar (Deemed to be University), Mullana
- Motto: Think Success Think MM(DU)
- Type: Deemed To Be University
- Established: 1993
- Founder: Tarsem Garg
- Affiliations: UGC
- Chancellor: Tarsem Garg
- Vice-Chancellor: Dr. Harish Kumar Sharma
- Location: Mullana, Ambala, Haryana, India; 30°15′2.75″N 77°2′42.21″E
- Website: www.mmumullana.org

Maharishi Markandeshwar (Deemed to be University), Mullana, is a private deemed university at Mullana near Ambala in the state of Haryana, India. It was founded in 1993 in the name of Maharishi Markandeshwar. It offers undergraduate and post-graduate programs in fields of engineering, hospitality, management, nursing and healthcare.

== Institutions ==
Constituent institutions on the main campus which come under this university include:

- Maharishi Markandeshwar Institute of Medical Sciences and Research
- Maharishi Markandeshwar College of Pharmacy
- Maharishi Markandeshwar College of Dental Sciences & Research
- Maharishi Markandeshwar Engineering College
- Maharishi Markandeshwar Institute of Physiotherapy & Rehabilitation
- Maharishi Markandeshwar Institute of Computer Technology & Business Management (Hotel Management)
- Maharishi Markandeshwar Institute of Computer Technology & Business Management (MCA)
- Maharishi Markandeshwar Institute of Management
- Maharishi Markandeshwar College of Nursing
- Maharishi Markandeshwar Department of Law
- Maharishi Markandeshwar Department of Agriculture

== Infrastructure ==
The campus includes 14 hostels and six residential blocks. It has a sports complex with Seven gyms, a swimming pool and one game arena. The campus has two shopping centers with four banks, a post office, and various eating shops. Also on campus there is an auditorium with seating capacity of about 1500.

== Rankings ==
University rankings

Engineering – India
- NIRF (2024): 151-200

Medical – India
- NIRF (2024): 35

The National Institutional Ranking Framework (NIRF) ranked the university between 151 and 200 in the engineering rankings and 35th in Medical in 2024. Also, MM college of Pharmacy which is a part of this university is ranked 26th by National Institutional Ranking Framework (NIRF)

== See also ==
- List of medical colleges in Haryana
