= Harbon =

- Location in Haryana, India
- Coordinates: 30.4303239°N 77.0976914°E
- Country: India
- State: Haryana
- District: Ambala
- Tehsil: Naraingarh
- Settled: Ancient

Government
  - Governor: Kaptan Singh Solanki
- Elevation: 275 m (902 ft)

Languages
  - Official: Hindi, Regional Haryanvi
- Time zone: UTC+5:30 (IST)
- PIN: 134203
- Telephone code: 01734
- ISO 3166 code: IN-HR
- Distance from Delhi: 238 kilometres (148 mi)
- Distance from Mumbai: 1,645 kilometres (1,022 mi)

Harbon is the notified area and village in Naraingarh Tehsil of Ambala district in the Indian State of Haryana. It is known for the cultivation of rice, wheat, barley and sugarcane. The production of the crops so obtained is supplied all over North India.

== Geography ==
Harbon is located 11 km from Naraingarh main town, 35 km towards east from the District Headquarters in Ambala City and 40 km from state capital Chandigarh. The village is surrounded by Naraingarh Tehsil towards East, Barwala Tehsil towards west, Morni Tehsil towards North, Shahzadpur Tehsil towards South. The elevation of the village is 275 m above mean sea level in Mumbai. The nearby villages include Bari Bassi (6 km), Kakkar Majra (5 km), Bheron (5 km), Kohrabhura (5 km) and Kherki Manakpur (6 km).

== Demographics ==
As per Population Census 2011, the village has the population of 1147 of which 620 are males and 527 are females. In Harbon, about 14.56% of the total population is under six years of age. The average literacy rate of Harbon is 65.92% which includes Male literacy at 68.76% while female literacy rate stands at 62.85%. Hindi the official language in the area. People also speak other Indo- Aryan native languages like Haryanvi and Punjabi.

== Government ==
As per constitution of India and Panchyati Raaj Act, the area is administrated by Sarpanch (Head of Village) who is elected representative of village under the government of Haryana. Harbon is the only village that comes under the village panchayat of Harbon.

== History ==
Named Harbon is the only village in the world. This village got named as Harbon from the name of hidimba. Hidimba(a) is married to the Pandava Bhima and mother of Ghatotkacha in theMahābhārata. She meets Bhima in the 9th sub-parva (Hidimva-vadha Parva) of the Adi Parva. It is said to be the birth place of hidimba and there is a small temple in the memory of her. It is believed that hidimba herself guards the village.

== See also ==
- Gagsina
