= Naraingarh =

Naraingarh Narayangarh
- Town
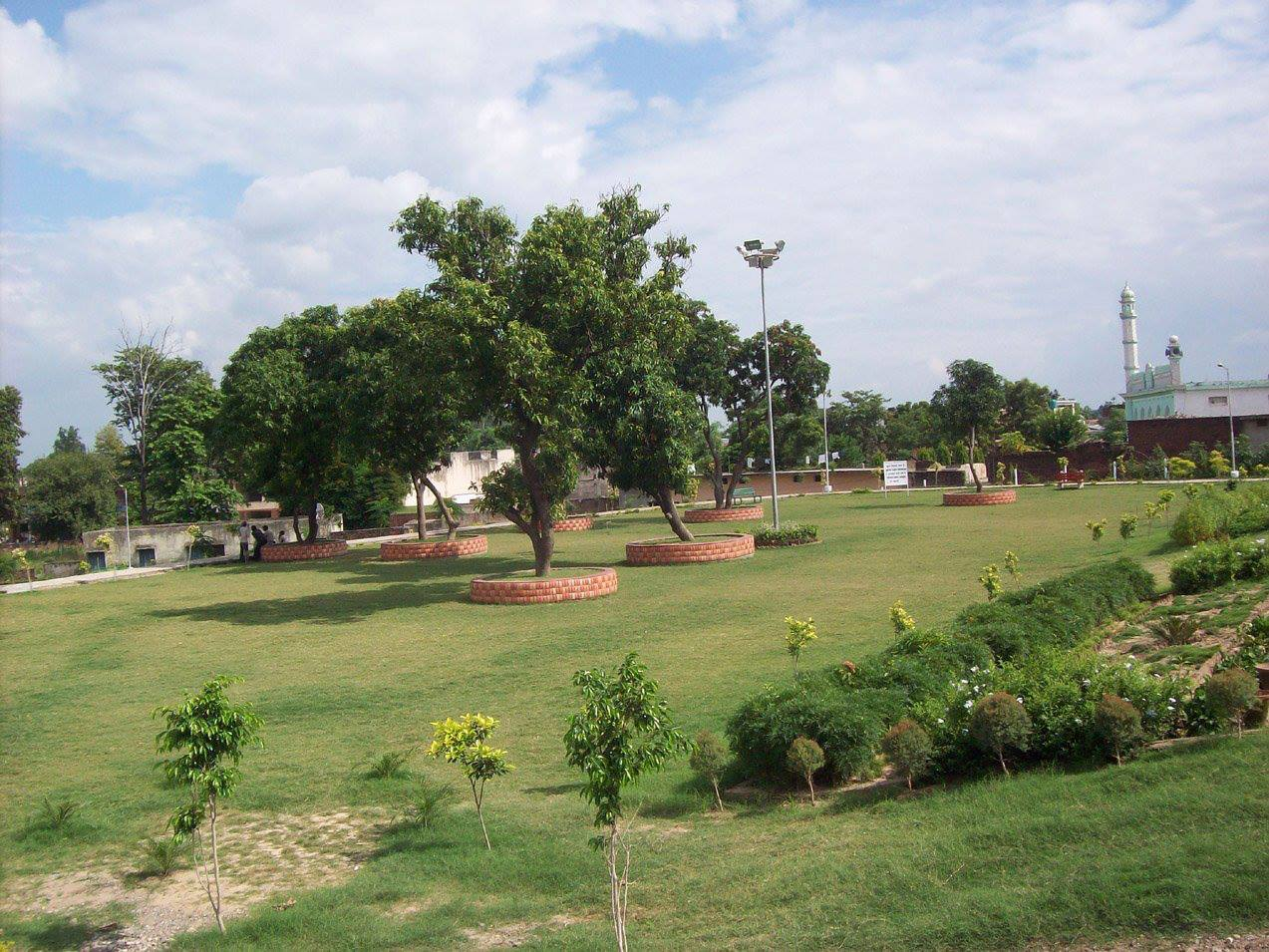
- Mc-park-naraingarh

- Location in Haryana, India Naraingarh (India)
- Coordinates: 30°28′35″N 77°07′40″E
- Country: India
- State: Haryana
- District: Ambala
- Founder: Raja Lakshmi Narain King of Sirmaur
- Named for: Raja Lakshmi Narain of Sirmaur State

Government
  - Body: Municipal Corporation

Area
  - Total: 481 km^{2} (186 sq mi)

Population (2011)
  - Total: 28,832
  - Density: 59.9/km^{2} (155/sq mi)
- Demonym: Naraiangarhiye

Languages
  - Official: Hindi
  - Additional official: English, Punjabi
  - Regional: Haryanvi
- Time zone: UTC+5:30 (IST)
- PIN: 134203
- Telephone code: 91 1734
- ISO 3166 code: IN-HR
- Vehicle registration: HR-04
- Sex ratio: 890
- Website: haryana.gov.in

Naraingarh (also: Narayangarh) is a town, municipal committee and assembly constituency in the Ambala district of the Indian state of Haryana, located on the border with the Indian state of Himachal Pradesh. Due to its geographical location, Naraingarh plays an important role in local tourism, being located 39 km from Ambala, the district headquarter, 52 km (32 miles) of Chandigarh, the state capital, 144 km (89 miles) of Shimla, and 230 km (142 miles) of New Delhi.

== Etymology ==
The name Naraingarh (Narayangarh) is a portmanteau of Narayana and Garh. Narayana refers to Hindu god Narayana, is the supreme absolute being in Hinduism and is considered as the supreme deity in Vaishnavism, while Garh means fort.

Raja Lakshmi Narain of Sirmur State, during the time of the disintegration of the Mughal Empire, built a fort at Kulsan, which he named after himself, Naraingarh. The fort has been now encroached upon by the tahsil offices and police station.

== Geography and ecology ==
=== Location ===
Naraingarh is located near the foothills of the Sivalik range of the Himalayas in northwest India. It covers an area of approximately 481 km^{2}. It shares its borders with the states of Himachal Pradesh. The exact cartographic co-ordinates of Narayangarh are 30.47°N 77.13°E.It has an average elevation of 325 metres (1065 ft).

Naraingarh, lying in the northern plains, has vast fertile and flat land. It has portions of Bhabar in the north east and Terai in rest of the area.

=== Climate ===
Naraingarh

Climate chart (precipitation, max. and min. temperature)
J	F	M	A	M	J	J	A	S	O	N	D
33 16 3	39 20 5	30 25 10	9 32 16	28 35 20	145 36 22	280 31 21	308 30 20	133 30 19	22 29 14	9 24 8	22 19 4
- █ Average max. and min. temperatures in °C
- █ Precipitation totals in mm
Imperial conversion
J	F	M	A	M	J	J	A	S	O	N	D
1.3 62 38	1.5 68 42	1.2 78 51	0.4 89 61	1.1 96 68	5.7 96 72	11 88 70	12 85 69	5.2 86 66	0.9 84 57	0.4 76 46	0.9 66 39
- █ Average max. and min. temperatures in °F
- █ Precipitation totals in inches

Naraingarh has a humid subtropical climate (Köppen: Cwa) characterised by a seasonal rhythm: very hot summers, mild winters, unreliable rainfall and great variation in temperature (−1 °C to 46 °C OR 30.2 °F to 114 °F). The town also receives occasional winter rains from the Western Disturbance originating over the Mediterranean Sea.

The western disturbances usually brings rain predominantly from mid-December till end of April which can be heavier sometimes with strong winds and hails if the weather turns colder (during March–April months) which usually proves disastrous to the crops. Cold winds usually tend to come from the north near Shimla, capital of Himachal Pradesh and from the state of Jammu and Kashmir, both of which receive their share of snowfall during wintertime.

The town experiences the following seasons and the respective average temperatures:

- Spring: The climate remains the most enjoyable part of the year during the spring season (from February-end to early-April). Temperatures vary between (max) 13 °C to 20 °C and (min) 5 °C to 12 °C.
- Autumn: In autumn (from September-end to mid-November.), the temperature may rise to a maximum of 30 °C. Temperatures usually remain between 10° and 22° in autumn. The minimum temperature is around 6 °C.
- Summer: The temperature in summer (from mid-April to June-end) may rise to 44 °C. The temperatures might sometime rise to 44 °C in mid-June. Temperatures generally vary between 40 and 42 °C.
- Monsoon: During monsoon (from early-July to mid-September), Naraingarh receives moderate to heavy rainfall and sometimes heavy to very heavy rainfall (generally during the month of August or September). Usually, the rain bearing monsoon winds blow from south-west/south-east. Mostly, the town receives heavy rain from south (which is mainly a persistent rain) but it generally receives most of its rain during monsoon either from North-west or North-east. Maximum amount of rain received by the town of Naraingarh during monsoon season is 195.5 mm in a single day.
- Winter: Winters (November-end to February-end) are mild but it can sometimes get quite chilly in Naraingarh. Average temperatures in the winter remain at (max) 5 °C to 14 °C and (min) -1 °C to 5 °C. Rain usually comes from the west during winters and it is usually a persistent rain for 2–3 days with sometimes hailstorms. The maximum temperature on Monday, 7 January 2013 plunged to a 30-year low to settle at 6.1 degrees Celsius.

Climate data for Naraingarh
Month	Jan	Feb	Mar	Apr	May	Jun	Jul	Aug	Sep	Oct	Nov	Dec	Year
Record high °C (°F)	27.7 (81.9)	32.8 (91.0)	37.8 (100.0)	42.7 (108.9)	44.6 (112.3)	45.3 (113.5)	42.0 (107.6)	39.0 (102.2)	37.5 (99.5)	37.0 (98.6)	34.0 (93.2)	28.5 (83.3)	45.6 (114.1)
Mean daily maximum °C (°F)	20.4 (68.7)	23.1 (73.6)	28.4 (83.1)	34.5 (94.1)	38.3 (100.9)	38.6 (101.5)	34.0 (93.2)	32.7 (90.9)	33.1 (91.6)	31.8 (89.2)	27.3 (81.1)	22.1 (71.8)	30.4 (86.7)
Mean daily minimum °C (°F)	6.1 (43.0)	8.3 (46.9)	13.4 (56.1)	18.9 (66.0)	23.1 (73.6)	25.4 (77.7)	23.9 (75.0)	23.3 (73.9)	21.8 (71.2)	17.0 (62.6)	10.5 (50.9)	6.7 (44.1)	16.5 (61.7)
Record low °C (°F)	0.0 (32.0)	0.0 (32.0)	4.2 (39.6)	7.8 (46.0)	13.4 (56.1)	14.8 (58.6)	14.2 (57.6)	17.2 (63.0)	14.3 (57.7)	9.4 (48.9)	3.7 (38.7)	0.0 (32.0)	0.0 (32.0)
Average rainfall mm (inches)	33.1 (1.30)	38.9 (1.53)	30.4 (1.20)	8.5 (0.33)	28.4 (1.12)	145.2 (5.72)	280.4 (11.04)	307.5 (12.11)	133.0 (5.24)	21.9 (0.86)	9.4 (0.37)	21.9 (0.86)	1,059.3 (41.70)
Average rainy days	2.6	2.8	2.6	1.1	2.1	6.3	12.3	11.4	5.0	1.4	0.8	1.4	49.8
Source: India Meteorological Department (record high and low up to 2010)

== Demographics ==
=== Population ===
As of 2011 Indian Census, Naraingarh had a total population of 22,832, of which 12,016 were males and 10,816 were females. Population within the age group of 0 to 6 years was 2,589. The total number of literates in Naraingarh was 17,512, which constituted 76.7% of the population with male literacy of 79.6% and female literacy of 73.4%. The effective literacy rate of 7+ population of Naraingarh was 86.5%, of which male literacy rate was 90.8% and female literacy rate was 81.8%. The Scheduled Castes population was 5,834. Naraingarh had 4677 households in 2011.

=== Languages ===
Hindi is the official language of Naraingarh. Punjabi and English are additional official languages. Haryanvi is the regional language.

== Politics ==
Naraingarh (Vidhan Sabha constituency) is the assembly constituency.

== Transport ==
Naraingarh is connected by road to all of the other major cities of north India including Delhi, Dehradun, Chandigarh, Jalandhar, Paonta Sahib and Shimla.

NH 72 passes through Naraingarh and connects it to Ambala, Shahzadpur, Nahan, Paonta Sahib and Haridwar. NH 73 passes through Naraingarh and connects it to Punchkula, Shahzadpur, Saha, Yamunanagar, SaharanPur and Haridwar. State Highway 1 connects it to state capital Chandigarh and Raipur Rani.

== Villages by Population ==
Following is a list of villages by population in Naraingarh Tehsil according to 2011 Census of India

Villages by Population (2010)
No	Village	Total Population
1	Dera	7,872
2	Shahzadpur	7,278
3	Pathreri	5,645
4	Gadhauli	4,949
5	Badhauli	4,442
6	Jatwar	4,230
7	Kurali(B.S)	4,222
8	Dhanana	4,052
9	Panjlasa	3,203
10	Korwa Khurd	2,957
