= Ambala district =

Coordinates: 30°25′N 77°10′E

- District
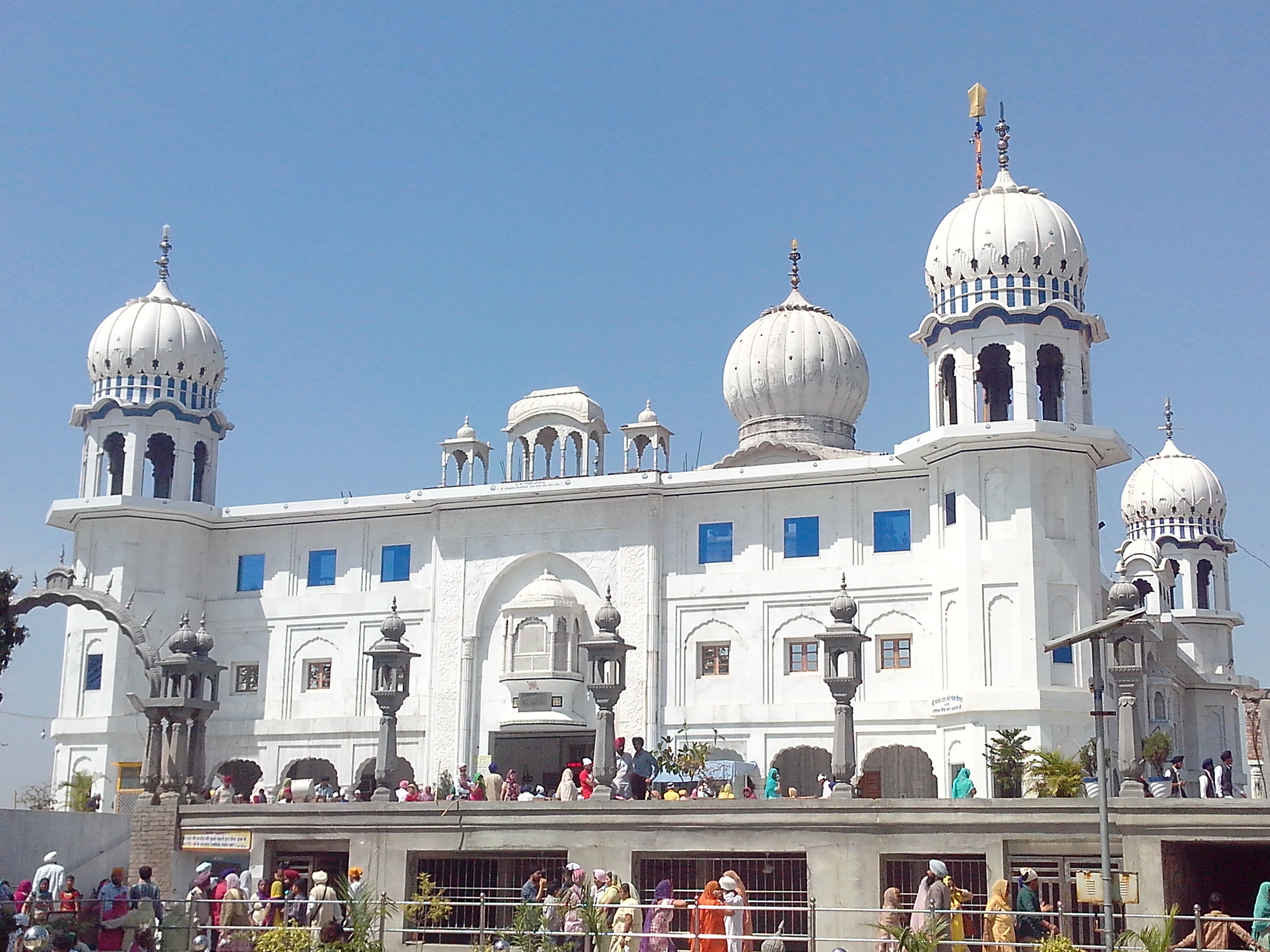
- Gurudwara Panjokhra Sahib in Ambala

- Location in Haryana
- Country: India
- State: Haryana
- Division: Ambala
- Headquarters: Ambala
- Tehsils: 1. Ambala, 2. Barara, 3. Naraingarh 4. Ambala Cantt

Area
  - Total: 1,569 km^{2} (606 sq mi)

Population (2011)
  - Total: 1,128,350
  - Density: 719.2/km^{2} (1,863/sq mi)
  - Urban: 500,774

Demographics
  - Literacy: 87.46%
  - Sex ratio: 885

Languages
  - Official: Hindi
  - Regional: Haryanvi (Ambalvi); Puadhi
- Time zone: UTC+05:30 (IST)
- Lok Sabha constituencies: Ambala (shared with Panchkula and Yamuna Nagar districts)
- Vidhan Sabha constituencies: 4
- Website: http://ambala.nic.in/

Ambala district is one of the 23 districts of Haryana state in the country of India with Ambala town serving as the administrative headquarters of the district. District Ambala lies on the North-Eastern edge of Haryana and borders Punjab and Himachal Pradesh. Ambala district is a part of Ambala Division.

== History ==
Ambala district was gradually annexed by the British in several stages, with different parts coming under their control over time.

In 1809, the Cis-Sutlej States came under the protection of the British By Treaty of Amritsar. At that time, the estate of Ambala was governed by Daya Kaur, the widow of Sardar Gurbakhsh Singh, who had died in 1783.

In 1808, Daya Kaur was briefly removed from control by Ranjit Singh, but she was reinstated by General Ochterlony. When she died in 1823, the estate came under British administration, and Ambala was designated as the residence of the Political Agent overseeing the Cis-Sutlej States. while its Jagadhari area was annexed later, in 1829 from its sardar. Until First Anglo-Sikh War whole district came under direct control of British company. in 1849 District transfer to Punjab Province along with Cis-Sutlej states. Gurudwara Manji Sahib Baoli, on NH-44 In Ambala, was built by the sixth Sikh Guru, Guru Hargobind Singh. See also stepwells of Haryana.

== Divisions ==
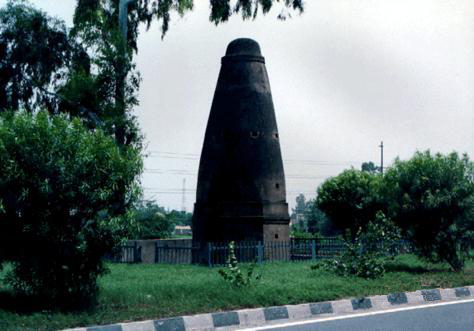
Kos Minar near Ambala along Grand Trunk Road in Haryana

This district falls under the Ambala Lok Sabha constituency, which is a reserved for the Scheduled Caste candidates only. This district also has four Vidhan Sabha constituencies, all of which are part of Ambala Lok Sabha constituency. Those are Ambala City, Ambala Cantt, Mulana and Naraingarh.

Administration of this district falls under the Ambala division and law and order falls under the Ambala Police Range. The district administration has two sub-divisions, Ambala and Naraingarh. District is further subdivided into 4 community development blocks and 7 revenue tehsils. Community development blocks are Ambala, Ambala Cantt, Barara and Naraingarh. Tehsils are Ambala, Ambala Cantt, Barara, Mullana, Saha, Shahzadpur and Naraingarh.

== Economy ==
Located in the Indo-Gangetic Plain, the land is generally fertile and conducive to agriculture. However, primary sector contributes much lesser to the economy of the district than it does to the economy of Haryana. Small scale industries form the bulk of the industrial landscape in the district. It is one of the largest producers of scientific and surgical instruments in the country and home to a large number of scientific instrument manufacturers due to which it is also referred as Science City.

== Demographics ==
Historical population
Year	Pop.	±% p.a.
1901	330,735	—
1911	277,417	−1.74%
1921	258,229	−0.71%
1931	297,802	+1.44%
1941	339,882	+1.33%
1951	365,383	+0.73%
1961	453,581	+2.19%
1971	539,297	+1.75%
1981	659,385	+2.03%
1991	806,482	+2.03%
2001	1,014,411	+2.32%
2011	1,128,350	+1.07%

According to the 2011 census, Ambala district had a population of 1,128,350 roughly equal to the nation of Cyprus or the US state of Rhode Island. It ranks 410th (out of a total of 640) in India in terms of population. The district has a population density of 720 inhabitants per square kilometre (1,900/sq mi) . Its population growth rate over the decade 2001-2011 was 11.23%. Ambala had a sex ratio of 885 females for every 1000 males, and a literacy rate of 81.75%. Scheduled Castes make up 26.25% of the population.

=== Religion ===
Religion in Ambala district
Religious group	2011	
Religious group	Pop.	%
Hinduism	955,096	84.65%
Sikhism	138,202	12.25%
Islam	22,143	1.96%
Christianity	3,705	0.33%
Others	9,204	0.82%
Total Population	1,128,350	100%

Population trends for major religious groups in Ambala district (1941–1961, 2001–2011) (Note: Note, Ambala district has gone through numerous boundary changes since 1941.)

Religious group	Population % 1941	Population % 1951	Population % 1961	Population % 2001	Population % 2011
Hinduism	48.68%	72.20%	71.45%	84.40%	84.65%
Islam	31.73%	2.40%	—	1.70%	1.96%
Sikhism	18.47%	24.60%	24.83%	13.06%	12.25%
Christianity	0.72%	—	—	0.28%	0.33%
Jainism	0.36%	—	—	0.52%	0.43%
Buddhism	0.02%	—	—	0.02%	0.03%
Other / No religion	0.04%	0.8%	3.73%	0.01%	0.35%

Religious groups in Ambala District (British Punjab province era)
Religious group	1881		1891		1901		1911		1921		1931		1941	
Religious group	Pop.	%	Pop.	%	Pop.	%	Pop.	%	Pop.	%	Pop.	%	Pop.	%
Hinduism (Note: 1931-1941: Including Ad-Dharmis)	689,612	64.62%	630,857	61.05%	510,105	62.52%	380,592	55.16%	370,125	54.31%	346,809	46.68%	412,658	48.68%
Islam	304,123	28.5%	300,856	29.11%	240,710	29.5%	205,203	29.74%	205,750	30.19%	230,837	31.07%	268,999	31.73%
Sikhism	68,442	6.41%	93,679	9.06%	58,073	7.12%	94,471	13.69%	97,614	14.32%	155,555	20.94%	156,543	18.47%
Christianity	3,773	0.35%	5,204	0.5%	4,362	0.53%	7,483	1.08%	5,679	0.83%	7,141	0.96%	6,065	0.72%
Jainism	1,307	0.12%	2,823	0.27%	2,614	0.32%	2,187	0.32%	2,272	0.33%	2,550	0.34%	3,065	0.36%
Zoroastrianism	6	0%	7	0%	14	0%	34	0%	30	0%	2	0%	48	0.01%
Buddhism	0	0%	0	0%	0	0%	0	0%	5	0%	6	0%	146	0.02%
Judaism	—N/a	—N/a	0	0%	2	0%	0	0%	1	0%	2	0%	4	0%
Others	0	0%	1	0%	0	0%	0	0%	1	0%	0	0%	217	0.03%
Total population	1,067,263	100%	1,033,427	100%	815,880	100%	689,970	100%	681,477	100%	742,902	100%	847,745	100%
Note: British Punjab province era district borders are not an exact match in the present-day due to various bifurcations to district borders — which since created new districts — throughout the historic Punjab Province region during the post-independence era that have taken into account population increases.

Religion in the Tehsils of Ambala District (1921)
Tehsil	Hinduism		Islam		Sikhism		Christianity		Jainism		Others (Note: Including Buddhism, Zoroastrianism, Judaism, Tribals, others, or not stated)		Total	
Tehsil	Pop.	%	Pop.	%	Pop.	%	Pop.	%	Pop.	%	Pop.	%	Pop.	%
Ambala Tehsil	105,591	56.19%	66,681	35.48%	11,777	6.27%	2,582	1.37%	1,260	0.67%	35	0.02%	187,926	100%
Kharar Tehsil	68,950	48.25%	29,977	20.98%	41,844	29.28%	1,884	1.32%	239	0.17%	0	0%	142,894	100%
Jagadhri Tehsil	83,749	66.1%	38,874	30.68%	3,683	2.91%	160	0.13%	237	0.19%	1	0%	126,704	100%
Naraingargh Tehsil	73,201	67.91%	31,384	29.11%	2,610	2.42%	257	0.24%	346	0.32%	0	0%	107,798	100%
Rupar Tehsil	38,634	33.26%	38,834	33.43%	37,700	32.46%	797	0.69%	190	0.16%	0	0%	116,155	100%
Note: British Punjab province era tehsil borders are not an exact match in the present-day due to various bifurcations to tehsil borders — which since created new tehsils — throughout the historic Punjab Province region during the post-independence era that have taken into account population increases.

Religion in the Tehsils of Ambala District (1941)
Tehsil	Hinduism		Islam		Sikhism		Christianity		Jainism		Others (Note: Including Anglo-Indian Christians, British Christians, Buddhism, Zoroastrianism, Judaism, Tribals, others, or not stated)		Total	
Tehsil	Pop.	%	Pop.	%	Pop.	%	Pop.	%	Pop.	%	Pop.	%	Pop.	%
Ambala Tehsil	122,627	51.95%	90,637	38.4%	18,504	7.84%	1,341	0.57%	1,894	0.8%	1,028	0.44%	236,031	100%
Kharar Tehsil	63,817	36.78%	39,156	22.57%	68,508	39.48%	1,184	0.68%	317	0.18%	532	0.31%	173,514	100%
Jagadhri Tehsil	102,825	66.01%	47,856	30.72%	4,154	2.67%	669	0.43%	241	0.15%	28	0.02%	155,773	100%
Naraingargh Tehsil	88,490	67.29%	38,950	29.62%	3,530	2.68%	247	0.19%	281	0.21%	0	0%	131,498	100%
Rupar Tehsil	34,899	23.12%	52,400	34.72%	61,847	40.98%	1,451	0.96%	332	0.22%	0	0%	150,929	100%
Note1: British Punjab province era tehsil borders are not an exact match in the present-day due to various bifurcations to tehsil borders — which since created new tehsils — throughout the historic Punjab Province region during the post-independence era that have taken into account population increases. Note2: Tehsil religious breakdown figures for Christianity only includes local Christians, labelled as "Indian Christians" on census. Does not include Anglo-Indian Christians or British Christians, who were classified under "Other" category.

=== Languages ===
Languages of Ambala district (2011 Census)
1. Hindi (84.6%)
2. Punjabi (10.9%)
3. Haryanvi (2.72%)
4. Others (1.76%)

Hindi (In Devanagri Script) is the official languages and thus used for official communication. At the time of the 2011 Census of India, 84.57% of the population in the district spoke Hindi, 10.95% Punjabi and 2.72% Haryanvi as their first language.

Language	1911	1921	1931	1961	1991	2001	2011
Hindi	3.50%	5.45%	—	66.72%	87.87%	85.26%	84.57%
Punjabi	35.71%	40.91%	36.12%	30.48%	10.93%	13.15%	10.96%
Urdu	—	53.05%	—	—	0.19%	0.11%	0.11%
Hindustani	56.39%	—	60.58%	—	—	—	—
Pahadi	3.10%	0.07%	2.62%	0.23%	—	—	—
Haryanvi	—	—	—	—	—	—	2.72%
Other	1.30%	0.52%	0.62%	~2.57%	1.00%	1.48%	1.64
During the British era district included Kharar and Ropar tehsils. In the 1961 Census, Ambala district comprised the tehsils of Ropar, Kharar, and Nalagarh which added into district in nearby 1956. After the enactment of the Punjab Reorganisation Act, 1966, Ambala became part of Haryana, and the 282 villages from Kharar and Ropar were transferred to Punjab and Nalagarth to Himachal. By the time of the 1971 Census, Ambala district included only four tehsils: Ambala, Jagadhri, Naraingarh, and Kalka. Kalka tehsil included 153 villages that had been transferred from Kharar tehsil to Haryana. Later censuses did not include the Panchkula and Yamuna nagar area under Ambala district, as Panchkula was carved out as a separate district in 1995 and Yamuna nagar in 1989.

== Cities, towns, villages, and other communities ==
- Ambala (city)
- Ambala Cantonment (city)
- Shahzadpur (town)
- Naraingarh (city)
- Kurali
- Harbon
- Barara (town)
- Saha
- Badhauli (village)
- Mullana (town)
- Kardhan (urban village)
- Sountli (village)

== Notable people ==
- Abdullah Sahib, a Gilgit Agency Governor
